= RD-120 =

Soviet (now Russian) liquid rocket engine

RD-120 (РД-120)
- Country of origin: Soviet Union; Russia
- Designer: NPO Energomash, V.K.Chvanov, V.P. Radovsky
- Manufacturer: Yuzhmash
- Application: Upper stage
- Status: Operational

Liquid-fuel engine
- Propellant: LOX / RP-1
- Cycle: Staged combustion cycle

Performance
- Thrust, vacuum: Standard: 834 kN (187,000 lb_{f}); Uprated: 912 kN (205,000 lb_{f})
- Thrust-to-weight ratio: Standard: 75.55 (Note: $\frac{833,565\ \mathrm{N}}{(1,125\ \mathrm{kg})(9.807\ \mathrm{m/s^2})}=75.55$); Uprated: 82.66 (Note: $\frac{912,018\ \mathrm{N}}{(1,125\ \mathrm{kg})(9.807\ \mathrm{m/s^2})}=82.66$)
- Chamber pressure: Standard: 162.8 bar (16.28 MPa); Uprated: 178.1 bar (17.81 MPa)
- Specific impulse, vacuum: 350 s (3.4 km/s)
- Burn time: 315 seconds

Dimensions
- Length: 3.87 m (12.7 ft)
- Diameter: 1.95 m (6.4 ft)
- Dry mass: 1,125 kg (2,480 lb)

Used in
- Zenit-2, Zenit-3SL

The RD-120 (Russian: Ракетный Двигатель-120, romanized: Raketnyy Dvigatel-120, lit. 'Rocket Engine 120', GRAU index: 11D123) is a liquid upper stage rocket engine burning RG-1 (refined kerosene) and LOX in an oxidizer rich staged combustion cycle with an O/F ratio of 2.6. It is used in the second stage of the Zenit family of launch vehicles. It has a single, fixed combustion chamber and thus on the Zenit it is paired with the RD-8 vernier engine. The engine was developed from 1976 to 1985 by NPO Energomash with V.P. Radovsky leading the development. It is manufactured by, among others, Yuzhmash in Ukraine.

It should not be confused with the RD-0120, which is a discontinued LOX/hydrogen rocket engine that was used in the Soviet Energia launch system.

== History ==
During the Buran programme initial development of the 11D77 —the launch vehicle later known as Zenit, KBKhA had been assigned the development of the second stage engine, as they had done for the Proton and Soyuz vehicles. But given the difficulties for NPO Energomash in developing the RD-123 (which would later be known as the RD-170), they ceded the hydrogen / oxygen sustainer engine development to KBKhA. This project, the analog of the SSME, was project RD-130 within NPO Energomash. But when KBKhA tackled the development, named it RD-0120, a name that is always a source of confusion with the engine of the current article. In exchange for them tackling the difficult development of the cryogenic propellant engine, Energomash assumed the responsibility of developing the second stage engine of the 11D77, which would eventually be known as the RD-120.

On March 16, 1976 the Government passed a resolution for the development of Zenit, the RD-171 and RD-120. By April 1976, Yuzhnoye supplied NPO Energomash with the final requirements for the 11D77 first and second stage propulsion. One of the desirable effects of consolidating the first and second stage propulsion on the same designer, was that they could learn their lessons on staged combustion engines on the smaller and simpler upper stage engine, and then apply them to the bigger and more innovative first stage RD-170. NPO Energomash, had already worked on a prototype kerosene / oxygen staged combustion engine in that range, based on the RD-268 hypergolic engine, which was already under serial production with Yuzhmash. In February, 1977, the preliminary design of the RD-120 was finished. And on January 31, 1979 the first fire test of the RD-120 was performed.

The RD-120 had a complicated debut, with the second stage failing on its first (April 13, 1985), second (June 21, 1985) and fourth (December 28, 1985) flights. While only the first failure could be attributed to the RD-120 —the propellant flow regulator had a leak and the stage ran out of propellant before being orbital—, the program initial performance was quite troubling. Eventually it proved its worth, and by December 1987 the RD-120 (and the Zenit) were considered commissioned. But in the years of the Soviet dissolution, the second stage failed twice in a row on August 30, 1991 and February 5, 1992. Zenit had other second stage failures, but only the first one has ever been attributed directly to the RD-120 itself.

During 1990, the NPO Energomash Head of the Propulsion Department, and leading designer, V.K.Chvanov, was awarded the State Prize for the creation of RD-120.

In October 1992, Pratt & Whitney signed an agreement with NPO Energomash to sell and represent their line of engines in the United States. During the initial version of the X-34 program, which tried to develop a reusable launch vehicle for small payloads through a public/private association, the RD-120 was seriously considered for the 747 air-launched first stage. The RD-120 offered the best price and performance, and was the preferred choice of Orbital Sciences. In fact, on October 11, 1995, the RD-120 was fired in the U.S. and thus became the first Russian rocket engine actively in production to be fired on American soil. This version of the engine, would mainly differ from the Zenit in the addition of a gimbal mount that would enable it to offer TVC. This version would be known as the RD-120M. The second private partner in the X-34 program, Rockwell International, wanted to use their own engine, the RS-27. Given the constrained schedule and budget of the program, the engine selection was not able to be resolved and the program was cancelled and reimplemented as the pure NASA research program that the X-34 was later known for.

Also during the 1990s, the Chinese acquired two or three models of the RD-120, and possibly some documentation. This enabled them to bootstrap their indigenous kerosene staged combustion engine program, the YF-100 and YF-115.

The RD-120 had significant margins built in, which between 2001 and 2003 allowed the development of a modernized 'Uprated' or 'Forced' version of the engine for Sea Launch which increased thrust 10% to 912 kN (205,000 lbf). Other improvements allowed it to increase chamber pressure and thrust without additional weight gain. It still has a 5% margin, extending the design life to 4260 seconds, the number of ignitions to 19 and allowing it to be considered as a base for a reusable rocket. However, the engine is still not capable of restarting inflight. After a program that used 4 test engines and performed 28 hot fire tests with an accumulated running time of 8,135 seconds, the engine was qualified for flight. Testing started in March 2004 and it had its debut flight on February 15, 2006 where it successfully orbited EchoStar X.

== Versions ==
This engine has had two operative versions and some proposed variations:

- RD-120 (GRAU Index 11D123): Original version developed for the Zenit-2 second stage. The main characteristics is that it uses a vertical turbopump, since the fuel tank is a torus and the engine has to fit in the center hole.
- RD-120 (augmented thrust) (GRAU Index 11D123): Thrust augmented version developed for the Zenit-3SL second stage. Some authors identified it as the RD-120M (GRAU Index 11D123M).
- RD-120K: Project of unknown first stage project. Had reduced expansion area and the subsystem arrangements was done to reduce total length. It had enough development done that it actually performed some fire tests.
- RD-120M: Version proposed for the X-34 program. It added a gimbaled mount, and was test fired in the USA.
- RD-120U: Version proposed for the ULV-22.
- RD-146
- RD-182: Methane / LOX version of the RD-120K. Proposed for the Riksha launch vehicle project for the Makeyev Rocket Design Bureau.
- RD-182M: LNG / LOX version of the RD-182. Proposed for the Vozdushnyy Start launch vehicle project.
- RD-870: Ukrainian version of RD-120K with Russian-produced combustion chamber replaced with modified RD-263 engines from stocks, being developed by Yuzhnoye Design Bureau for use in the first stage of Cyclone-4M SLV.

RD-120 Family of Engines
Name	RD-120	RD-120 (augmented thrust)	RD-120K	RD-870
AKA	11D123	11D123; 11D123M?		
Development years	1976–1985	2001–2003	1986–	2016–
Engine Type	Oxidizer Rich Stage Combustion upper stage liquid rocket engine			
Propellant	RG-1/LOX (O/F 2.6)			
Chamber Pressure	16.28 MPa (2,361 psi)	17.81 MPa (2,583 psi)	17.63 MPa (2,557 psi)	16 MPa (160 kgf/cm^{2})
Thrust (Vac)	833.6 kN (187,400 lbf)	912 kN (205,000 lbf)	853.2 kN (191,800 lbf)	867.5 kN (88.46 tf)
Thrust (SL)	N/A	N/A	784.5 kN (176,400 lbf)	781 kN (79.6 tf)
Isp (Vac)	350 s (3.4 km/s)	350 s (3.4 km/s)	330 s (3.2 km/s)	332 s (3.26 km/s)
Isp (SL)	N/A	N/A	304.4 s (2.985 km/s)	298 s (2.92 km/s)
Throttle	70–110%	70–110%	50–105%	98.5–101.5%
Nozzle Expansion	114.5	114.5	49.6	N/A
Burn time	290 seconds	290 seconds	305 seconds	200 seconds
Engine life	2,200 seconds	2,200 seconds	2,200 seconds	N/A
Length	3,872 mm (152.4 in)	3,872 mm (152.4 in)	2,435 mm (95.9 in)	2,746 mm (108.1 in)
Diameter	1,954 mm (76.9 in)	1,954 mm (76.9 in)	1,400 mm (55 in)	1,436 mm (56.5 in)
Weight	1,125 kg (2,480 lb)	1,125 kg (2,480 lb)	1,080 kg (2,380 lb)	1,280 kg (2,820 lb)
Used on	Zenit-2 Second Stage	Zenit-3SL Second Stage	Project	Cyclone-4M First Stage
First Launch	1985-04-13	1999-03-28	N/A	N/A
Status	In Production	In Production	Project	Project
References				

== Technological derivatives ==
The family tree of the RD-120

Not considering straight variations of the RD-120, this very influential engine has been the foundations of many engines spanning derivatives in four countries. The Ukrainian RD-801 and RD-810, the Chinese YF-100 and YF-115, as well as the Indian SCE-200 can be traced directly back to the RD-120. The Soviet/Russian RD-170 family of engines base developed on the lessons learned from the RD-120 project.

=== RD-170 family ===
As stated in the History section, the RD-120 was used as the first practical application of the oxidizer rich staged combustion with kerosene propellant at NPO Energomash, before tackling the RD-170. So, while this later family of engines have more aggressive performance parameters and the original project (the RD-123) predates the RD-120, it was indeed the first actual design of the series development.

=== RD-801 and RD-810 ===
While Yuzhnoye propulsion experience had been mostly on hypergolic propellants engines, like the RD-855 or RD-861, they were considered too toxic for modern ecological standards. While they still offer to develop hypergolic propulsion, like in the case of the RD-843 for the Vega's AVUM stage or the Tsyklon-4 project, for the Mayak launch vehicle family a more environmentally friendly LOX and kerosene propellant was decided.

Not only had Yuzhnoye mastered the most complex cycle for the propellant (oxidizer rich staged combustion cycle) with the RD-8, but they had worked closely with NPO Energomash during the RD-120 program. The manufacturing is done at its sister company of Yuzhmash in Ukraine, and the RD-120 thrust augmentation project of 2001 to 2003 had been a mixed project between the three companies.

On the base of this experience, a family of derivatives engines were proposed. The RD-805 and RD-809 are mostly modifications of the RD-8, but the RD-801 and the RD-810 members of the family can be considered true descendants of the RD-120. One characteristic of this family is the limitation of keeping the preburner output temperature below 500 °C (932 °F).

=== SCE-200 ===
On June 2, 2005, India and Ukraine signed the Framework Agreement between the Government of Ukraine and the Government of the Republic of India on Cooperation in the Peaceful Uses of Outer Space, which would enter in force on February 15, 2006. According to official press release on March 26, 2013 by Ukrainian Ministry of Economic Development and Trade, development of a rocket engine for Indian launch vehicles initiated in 2006 under a joint Indian-Ukrainian project named "Jasmine".

The engine blue prints supposedly transferred by Ukraine to India, have been identified as the RD-810. Since the transfer specifically excluded engineering analysis methods and software, the Indians did, in fact, had to develop most technologies and engineering models to manufacture and certify the engine. Given the practically identical specifications to the RD-810, and the fact that even the Indians used the Yuzhnoye renders of the engine in their presentations, it can be considered at least heavily influenced by the RD-120.

=== YF-100 and YF-115 ===
During the 1990s, the Chinese acquired two or three models of the RD-120, and possibly some documentation. This enabled them to bootstrap their indigenous kerosene staged combustion engine program, the YF-100 and YF-115.

As was the same case with the Indians and the RD-810, the transfer of the physical engines and blue prints only help in the development. But the development required ten years of research, requiring the mastering of 70 key technologies, the development of 50 new materials and the construction of 61 sets of engines with a combined total of more than 40,000 seconds of ignition time by 2013.

=== Derivatives comparison ===
RD-120 Technological Derivatives
Name	RD-120	RD-120 (augmented thrust)	RD-191	YF-100	RD-801	RD-810	SCE-200
AKA	11D123	11D123; 11D123M?					
Country of origin	Soviet Union	Russia/Ukraine	Russia	China	Ukraine	Ukraine	India
Designer	NPO Energomash	NPO Energomash/Yuzhnoye	NPO Energomash	AALPT		Yuzhnoye	LPSC
Development years	1976–1985	2001–2003	1999–2011	2000–2015	2005–	2005–	2005–
Engine Type	Oxidizer Rich Stage Combustion upper stage liquid rocket engine						
Propellant	RG-1/LOX (O/F 2.6)			Kerosene/LOX (O/F 2.6)	RG-1/LOX (O/F 2.65)		Isrosene/LOX (O/F 2.65)
Chamber Pressure	16.28 MPa (2,361 psi)	17.81 MPa (2,583 psi)	25.75 MPa (3,735 psi)	18 MPa (2,600 psi)	18 MPa (2,600 psi)	18 MPa (2,600 psi)	18 MPa (2,600 psi)
Thrust (Vac)	833.6 kN (187,400 lbf)	912 kN (205,000 lbf)	2,090 kN (470,000 lbf)	1,340 kN (300,000 lbf)	1,340 kN (300,000 lbf)	2,105 kN (473,000 lbf)	2,030 kN (460,000 lbf)
Thrust (SL)	N/A	N/A	1,920 kN (430,000 lbf)	1,200 kN (270,000 lbf)	1,198 kN (269,000 lbf)	1,876 kN (422,000 lbf)	1,820 kN (410,000 lbf)
Isp (Vac)	350 s (3.4 km/s)	350 s (3.4 km/s)	337.5 s (3.310 km/s)	335 s (3.29 km/s)	336 s (3.30 km/s)	335.5 s (3.290 km/s)	335 s (3.29 km/s)
Isp (SL)	N/A	N/A	311.2 s (3.052 km/s)	300 s (2.9 km/s)	300.7 s (2.949 km/s)	299 s (2.93 km/s)	299 s (2.93 km/s)
Throttle	70–110%	70–110%	27–105%	65–100%	N/A	N/A	65–105%
Nozzle Expansion	114.5	114.5	37	35	N/A	N/A	N/A
Burn time	290 seconds	290 seconds	325	155 seconds	200 seconds	N/A	N/A
Length	3,872 mm (152.4 in)	3,872 mm (152.4 in)	3,780 mm (149 in)	N/A	N/A	N/A	N/A
Diameter	1,954 mm (76.9 in)	1,954 mm (76.9 in)	2,100 mm (83 in)	1,338 mm (52.7 in)	N/A	N/A	N/A
Weight	1,125 kg (2,480 lb)	1,125 kg (2,480 lb)	2,200 kg (4,900 lb)	N/A	1,630 kg (3,590 lb)	2,800 kg (6,200 lb)	2,700 kg (6,000 lb)
Used on	Zenit-2 Second Stage	Zenit-3SL Second Stage	Angara	LM-5, LM-6 and LM-7	Mayak	Mayak	ULV
First Launch	1985-04-13	1999-03-28	2014-07-09	2015-09-20	N/A	N/A	N/A
Status	Retired	In Production	In Production	In Production	Project	Project	In Development
References							

== See also ==
- NPO Energomash – Engine designer.
- Yuzhmash – Engine manufacturer.
- Zenit – Launch vehicle that used the RD-120 as second stage.
- YF-100 – Chinese engine that supposedly is based on the RD-120 technology.
- RD-810 – Ukrainian engine based on the RD-120 technology.
- SCE-200 – Indian engine supposedly based on RD-120 technology.
