= RD-8 =

Soviet rocket engine

RD-8 (РД-8)
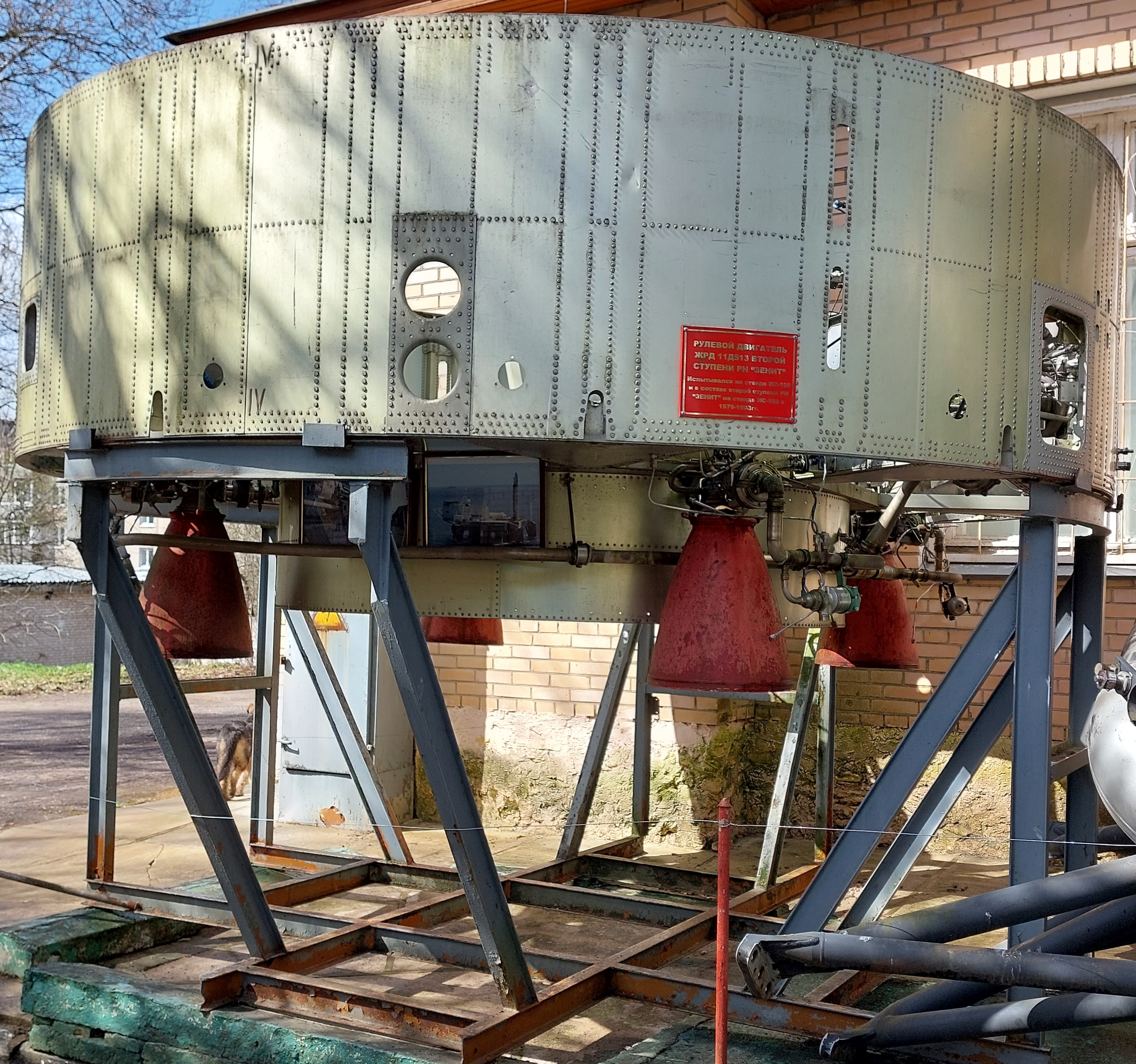
- Country of origin: Soviet Union
- First flight: April 13, 1985
- Designer: Yuzhnoye Design Bureau
- Manufacturer: Yuzhmash
- Application: Second Stage Vernier
- Associated LV: Zenit
- Successor: RD-809M
- Status: In Production

Liquid-fuel engine
- Propellant: LOX / RG-1
- Mixture ratio: 2.4
- Cycle: Staged Combustion

Configuration
- Chamber: 4

Performance
- Thrust, vacuum: 78.45 kN (17,640 lb_{f})
- Chamber pressure: 7.747 MPa (1,123.6 psi)
- Specific impulse, vacuum: 342 s (3.35 km/s)
- Burn time: 1100 s
- Gimbal range: ±33°

Dimensions
- Length: 1,500 mm (59 in)
- Diameter: 4,000 mm (160 in)
- Dry mass: 380 kg (840 lb)

Used in
- Zenit family second stage

The RD-8 (Russian: РД-8 and GRAU Index: 11D513) is a Soviet / Ukrainian liquid propellant rocket engine burning LOX and RG-1 (a rocket grade kerosene) in an oxidizer rich staged combustion cycle. It has four combustion chambers that provide thrust vector control by gimbaling each of the nozzles in a single axis ±33°. It was designed in Dnipropetrovsk by the Yuzhnoye Design Bureau as the vernier thruster of the Zenit (GRAU: 11K77) second stage. As such, it has always been paired with the RD-120 engine for main propulsion.

It can only be started once, and as a high altitude engine it has a thrust of 78.45 kN (17,640 lb_{f}) and a specific impulse of 342 s (3.35 km/s). It is the first ever steering engine to use the staged combustion cycle, and as such is the basis for a family of planned engines for the Mayak launch vehicle family.

The engine itself is built like a hollow cylinder, with a cylindrical space in the center so the RD-120 nozzle can pass through.

== Derivatives ==
Whilst Yuzhnoye's propulsion experience had been mostly on hypergolic propellants engines, like RD-855 or RD-861, they are considered too toxic for current ecological standards. While Yuzhnoye still offer to develop hypergolic propulsion, such as RD-843 for the Vega's AVUM stage or the Tsyklon-4 project, Yuzhnoye selected a more environmentally friendly LOX and kerosene propellant for the Mayak launch vehicle family.

Not only had Yuzhnoye mastered the most complex cycle for the propellant (oxidizer rich staged combustion cycle) with the RD-8, but they had worked closely with NPO Energomash during the RD-120 program. The manufacturing is done at its sister company of Yuzhmash in Dnipropetrovsk, and the RD-120 thrust augmentation project of 2001 to 2003 had been a mixed project between the three companies.

On the base of this experience, a family of derivatives engines were proposed. While the RD-801 and RD-810 are really just based on the general technology, the other members of the family are related enough that they reuse many components of the RD-8. One characteristic of this family is the limitation of keeping the preburner output temperature below 500 °C (932 °F).

- RD-805 (or RD-802): A proposed upper stage engine of just 19.62 kN (4,410 lb_{f}) of thrust, it would use a single chamber of the RD-8. While many new components would be required, it is considered a low technological risk since it only needs smaller versions of already developed component.
- RD-809 (sometimes identified as RD-809M): It is an RD-8 re arranged to minimize its diameter. It would use practically every single component of the RD-8, but arranged without the big hollow section in the middle. It was a proposed engine for a proposed liquid upper stage of the Antares rocket, then named Taurus II. It would be capable of five engine burns in a single mission.
- RD-809K: A single nozzle version of the RD-8. It mixes most principal elements of the RD-8 like the turbopumps with a main combustion chamber and nozzle adapted from the RD-861K. Initially it was announced that it would be capable of 4 starts in a single mission later reduced to 2. It is expected to be used in a dual engine configuration in the Mayak upper stage.

== See also ==
- RD-120 – The Zenit second stage main engine which is the companion of the RD-8 and the basis for some of its derivatives.
- Zenit – The launch vehicle family for which the RD-8 was developed.
- Mayak – Prospective Ukrainian launch vehicle family for which the RD-805, RD-809 and RD-809K are being developed.
- Yuzhnoe Design Bureau - The RD-8 designer bureau.
- Yuzhmash - A multi-product machine-building company that's closely related to Yuzhnoe and manufactures the RD-8.
