= RD-119 =

Liquid rocket engine

RD-119 (РД-119)
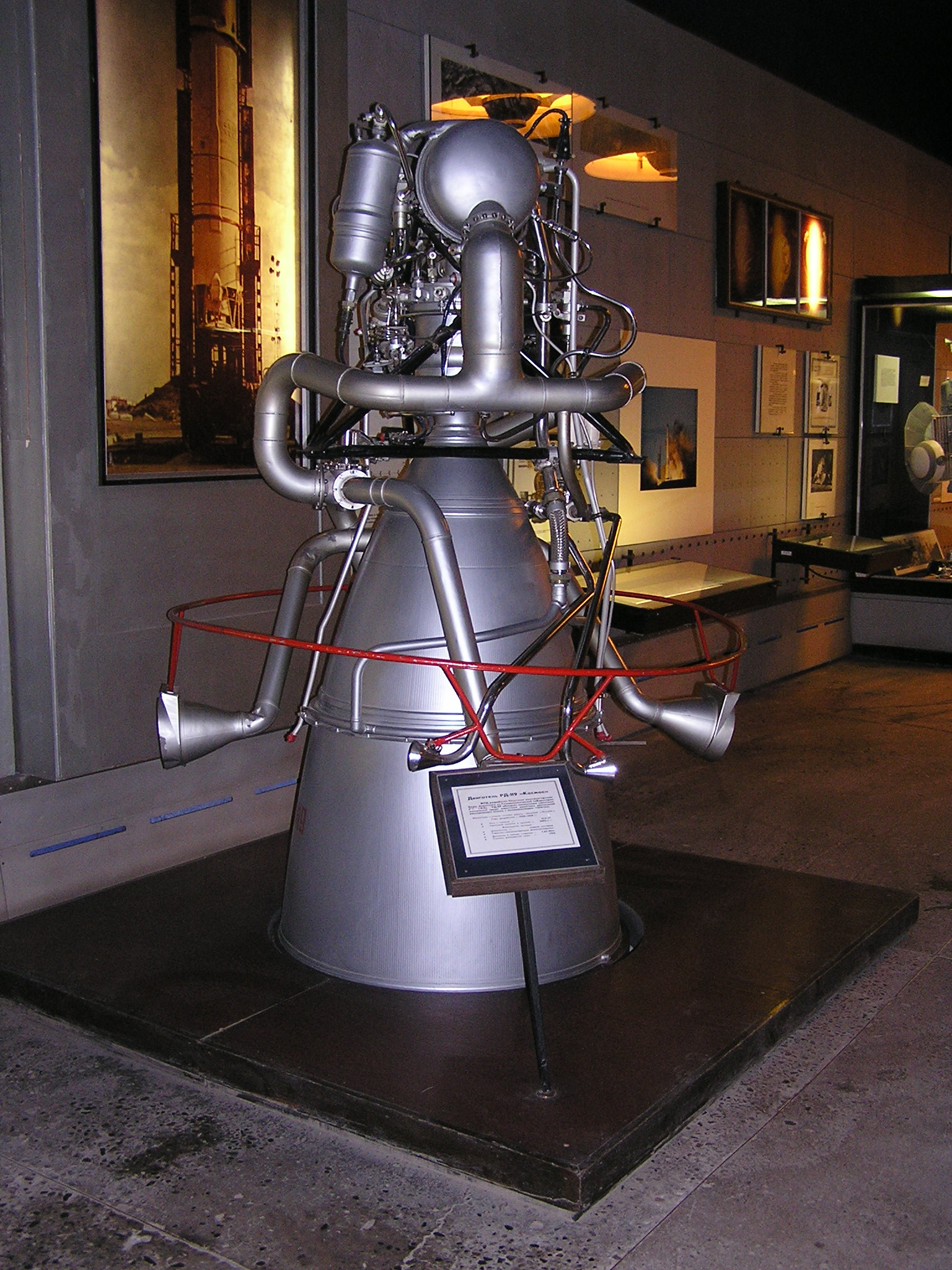
- Museum of Space and Missile Technology (Saint Petersburg). RD-119 rocket engine for Cosmos LV(11К63) second stage.
- Country of origin: Soviet Union
- Date: 1960–1963
- Designer: Energomash, V. Glushko
- Associated LV: Kosmos-2
- Status: Out of production

Liquid-fuel engine
- Propellant: LOX / UDMH
- Mixture ratio: 1.5
- Cycle: Gas generator

Configuration
- Chamber: 1
- Nozzle ratio: 102

Performance
- Thrust, vacuum: 106 kilonewtons (24,000 lbf)
- Thrust, sea-level: 65.6 kilonewtons (14,700 lbf)
- Chamber pressure: 7.9 megapascals (1,150 psi)
- Specific impulse, vacuum: 352 s (3.45 km/s)
- Specific impulse, sea-level: 220 s (2.2 km/s)
- Burn time: 260 s
- Gimbal range: Fixed with four fixed steering nozzles

Dimensions
- Length: 2,170 millimetres (85 in)
- Diameter: 1,024 millimetres (40.3 in)
- Dry mass: 168.5 kilograms (371 lb)

Used in
- Kosmos-2 (11K63)

The RD-119 (GRAU Index 8D710) was a liquid rocket engine, burning liquid oxygen and UDMH in the gas-generator cycle. It has a huge expansion ratio on the nozzle and uses a unique propellant combination to achieve an extremely high specific impulse of 352 s for a semi-cryogenic gas-generator engine. It also has a unique steering mechanism. The engine main nozzle is fixed, and the output of the gas generator is fed into four nozzles on the side of the engine. Instead of using gimbaled verniers to supply vector control, the combustion gases are distributed by an electrically driven system that can control the thrust among the nozzles.

== Development ==
Between 1958 and 1960, Valentin Glushko's OKB 456 developed the RD-109 for the Block-I of the 8K73 project—a liquid-oxygen/UDMH version of the R-7. But Sergei Korolev's refusal to use such a toxic combination shelved the project. When Mikhail Yangel's OKB-586 was tasked with developing a launch vehicle out of the R-12 ballistic missile, they had to develop an upper stage from scratch. The critical issue was the low specific impulse of the first stage, and thus a very high-efficiency upper-stage engine was needed. For this Glushko offered to adapt the RD-109, and Yangel accepted the proposal. It flew some very important missions on the Kosmos-2 launch vehicle, with about 165 engines produced.

== Versions ==
This engine had two versions.

- RD-109: GRAU Index 8D711, also known as GDU-10. It was the original proposal for the 8K73 Project Blok-I stage.
- RD-119: GRAU Index 8D710. It was the version used on the Kosmos-2.

RD-119 family of engines
Engine	RD-109	RD-119
AKA	8D711 or GDU-10	8D710
Development	1957–1960	1960–1963
Engine type	Gas generator	
Propellant	LOX/UDMH	
Combustion-chamber pressure	7.75 MPa (1,124 psi)	7.9 MPa (1,150 psi)
Thrust (vacuum)	101.6 kN (22,800 lbf)	106 kN (24,000 lbf)
Thrust (sea level)	N/A	65.6 kN (14,700 lbf)
I_{sp} (vacuum)	334 s (3.28 km/s)	352 s (3.45 km/s)
I_{sp} (sea level)	N/A	220 s (2.2 km/s)
Burn time	330 s	260 s
Length	2,280 mm (90 in)	2,170 mm (85 in)
Diameter	1,024 mm (40.3 in)	1,024 mm (40.3 in)
Dry mass	210 kg (460 lb)	168.5 kg (371 lb)
Use	8K73 project	Kosmos-2

== See also ==
- R-12 (missile) – ballistic missile for which this engine was originally developed.
- Kosmos-2 – launch vehicle that uses an R-12 as first stage.
- Rocket engine using liquid fuel

== Literature ==
Gluschko, V. P. (1985). Kosmonavtika Entsiklopediya - Cosmonautic Encyclopedia (Russian) - Космонавтика Энциклопедия (PDF). Moscow. p. 329. Archived (PDF) from the original on 11 July 2022.
