= RD-801 =

Ukrainian rocket engine

RD801 (РД801)
- Country of origin: Ukraine
- Designer: Yuzhnoye Design Bureau
- Manufacturer: Yuzhmash
- Application: First Stage
- Status: In development

Liquid-fuel engine
- Propellant: LOX / RG-1
- Mixture ratio: 2.65
- Cycle: Staged combustion

Configuration
- Chamber: 1

Performance
- Thrust, vacuum: 1,340 kN (300,000 lb_{f})
- Thrust, sea-level: 1,198 kN (269,000 lb_{f})
- Chamber pressure: 18 MPa (2,600 psi)
- Specific impulse, vacuum: 336 s (3.30 km/s)
- Specific impulse, sea-level: 300.7 s (2.949 km/s)
- Burn time: 200 s
- Gimbal range: 6

Dimensions
- Dry mass: 1,630 kg (3,590 lb)

The RD801 (Ukrainian: РД801) is a Ukrainian liquid propellant rocket engine burning LOX and kerosene (RG-1) in a staged combustion cycle. It has a single combustion chamber that provides thrust vector control by gimbaling of the nozzle in two axes by +/- 6°. It is being designed in Ukraine by Yuzhnoye Design Bureau for the prospective first stage propulsion of the Mayak rocket family.

The RD801 as well as the RD-810 are being designed based on the work of the RD-8 vernier and the maintenance and improvement of the RD-120 engines. The RD801 can be used stand alone on a Mayak or in a cluster.

== Versions ==
The designers have proposed three versions of this engine:

- RD801 (Ukrainian: РД801): This is the basic module with no TVC.
- RD801 (Ukrainian: РД801): This is a version which includes a TVC by gimbaling of the nozzle in two axes by +/- 6°.
- RD801V (Ukrainian: РД801В): High altitude of the rocket engine with extended nozzle.

== See also ==
- Mayak – Prospective Ukrainian launch vehicle family for which the RD801 is being developed.
- RD-8 – The Zenit second stage vernier engine which was the technological base for the RD801.
- RD-120 – The Zenit second stage main engine which was the technological base for the RD801
- RD-810 – A higher thrust engine of the same family.
- Yuzhnoe Design Bureau – The RD810 designer bureau.
- Yuzhmash – A multi-product machine-building company that's closely related to Yuzhnoe and would manufacture the RD801.
- YF-100 – A Chinese rocket engine of similar specifications based on RD801 design.
