= Tripropellant rocket =

Rocket that burns 3 propellants at once or 2 fuels with an oxidizer, sequentially

A tripropellant rocket is a rocket that uses three propellants, as opposed to the more common bipropellant rocket or monopropellant rocket designs, which use two or one propellants, respectively. Tripropellant systems can be designed to have high specific impulse and have been investigated for single-stage-to-orbit designs. While tripropellant engines have been tested by Rocketdyne and NPO Energomash, no tripropellant rocket has been flown.

There are two different kinds of tripropellant rockets. One is a rocket engine which mixes three separate streams of propellants, burning all three propellants simultaneously. The other kind of tripropellant rocket is one that uses one oxidizer but two fuels, burning the two fuels in sequence during the flight.

== Simultaneous burn ==
Simultaneous tripropellant systems often involve the use of a high energy density metal additive, like beryllium or lithium, with existing bipropellant systems. In these motors, the burning of the fuel with the oxidizer provides activation energy needed for a more energetic reaction between the oxidizer and the metal. While theoretical modeling of these systems suggests an advantage over bipropellant motors, several factors limit their practical implementation, including the difficulty of injecting solid metal into the thrust chamber; heat, mass, and momentum transport limitations across phases; and the difficulty of achieving and sustaining combustion of the metal.

In the 1960s, Rocketdyne test-fired an engine using a mixture of liquid lithium, gaseous hydrogen, and liquid fluorine to produce a specific impulse of 542 seconds, likely the highest measured such value for a chemical rocket motor. Despite the high specific impulse, the technical difficulties of the combination and the hazardous nature of the propellants precluded further development.

== Sequential burn ==
In sequential tripropellant rockets, the fuel is changed during flight, so the motor can combine the high thrust of a dense fuel like kerosene early in flight with the high specific impulse of a lighter fuel like liquid hydrogen (LH2) later in flight. The result is a single engine providing some of the benefits of staging.

For example, injecting a small amount of liquid hydrogen into a kerosene-burning engine can yield significant specific impulse improvements without compromising propellant density. This would have been demonstrated by the RD-701, theoretically capable of a specific impulse of 415 seconds in vacuum (higher than the pure LH2/LOX RS-68), where a pure kerosene engine with a similar expansion ratio would achieve 330–340 seconds.

Although liquid hydrogen delivers the largest specific impulse of the plausible rocket fuels, it also requires huge structures to hold it due to its low density. These structures can weigh a lot, offsetting the light weight of the fuel itself to some degree, and also result in higher drag while in the atmosphere. While kerosene has lower specific impulse, its higher density results in smaller structures, which reduces stage mass, and furthermore reduces losses to atmospheric drag. In addition, kerosene-based engines generally provide higher thrust, which is important for takeoff, reducing gravity drag. So in general terms there is a "sweet spot" in altitude where one type of fuel becomes more practical than the other.

Traditional rocket designs use this sweet spot to their advantage via staging. For instance the Saturn Vs used a lower stage powered by RP-1 (kerosene) and upper stages powered by LH2. Some of the early Space Shuttle design efforts used similar designs, with one stage using kerosene into the upper atmosphere, where an LH2 powered upper stage would light and go on from there. The later Shuttle design is somewhat similar, although it used solid rockets for its lower stages.

SSTO rockets could simply carry two sets of engines, but this would mean the spacecraft would be carrying one or the other set "turned off" for most of the flight. With light enough engines this might be reasonable, but an SSTO design requires a very high mass fraction and so has razor-thin margins for extra weight.

At liftoff the engine typically burns both fuels, gradually changing the mixture over altitude in order to keep the exhaust plume "tuned" (a strategy similar in concept to the plug nozzle but using a normal bell), eventually switching entirely to LH2 once the kerosene is burned off. At that point the engine is largely a straight LH2/LOX engine, with an extra fuel pump hanging onto it.

The concept was first explored in the US by Robert Salkeld, who published the first study on the concept in Mixed-Mode Propulsion for the Space Shuttle, Astronautics & Aeronautics, which was published in August 1971. He studied a number of designs using such engines, both ground-based and a number that were air-launched from large jet aircraft. He concluded that tripropellant engines would produce gains of over 100% (essentially more than double) in payload fraction, reductions of over 65% in propellant volume and better than 20% in dry weight. A second design series studied the replacement of the Shuttle's SRBs with tripropellant based boosters, in which case the engine almost halved the overall weight of the designs. His last full study was on the Orbital Rocket Airplane which used both tripropellant and (in some versions) a plug nozzle, resulting in a spaceship only slightly larger than a Lockheed SR-71, able to operate from traditional runways.

Tripropellant engines were built in Russia. Kosberg and Glushko developed a number of experimental engines in 1988 for a SSTO spaceplane called MAKS, but both the engines and MAKS were cancelled in 1991 due to a lack of funding. However, Glushko's RD-701 was never built, and only a smaller-scale test stand version was tested during development. However, Energomash feels that the problems are entirely solvable and that the design does represent one way to reduce launch costs by about 10 times.

== See also ==
- Tribrid engine
