= RD-810 =

Ukrainian rocket engine

RD-810 (РД-810)
- Country of origin: Ukraine
- Designer: Yuzhnoye Design Bureau
- Manufacturer: Yuzhmash
- Application: First Stage
- Status: In development

Liquid-fuel engine
- Propellant: LOX / RP-1
- Mixture ratio: 2.65
- Cycle: Staged combustion

Configuration
- Chamber: 1

Performance
- Thrust, vacuum: 2,105 kN (473,000 lb_{f})
- Thrust, sea-level: 1,876 kN (422,000 lb_{f})
- Chamber pressure: 18 MPa (2,600 psi)
- Specific impulse, vacuum: 335.5 s (3.290 km/s)
- Specific impulse, sea-level: 299 s (2.93 km/s)
- Gimbal range: 8

Dimensions
- Dry mass: 2,800 kg (6,200 lb)

The RD-810 (РД-810) is a Ukrainian liquid propellant rocket engine burning LOX and kerosene (RG-1) in a staged combustion cycle. It has a single combustion chamber that provides thrust vector control by gimbaling of the nozzle in two axes by +/- 8°. It is being designed in Ukraine by Yuzhnoye Design Bureau for the prospective first stage propulsion of the Mayak rocket family.

The RD-810 as well as the RD-801 are being designed based on the work of the RD-8 vernier and the maintenance and improvement of the RD-120 engines. The RD-810 can be used stand alone on a Mayak or could be used in a module of four called RD-810M to replace the RD-170 on the Zenit.

== See also ==
- Mayak – Prospective Ukrainian launch vehicle family for which the RD-810 is being developed.
- RD-801 – A smaller engine of the same family designed by Yuzhnoe.
- SCE-200 – An Indian rocket engine of equal specifications which might be based on the RD-810 blueprints.
- Yuzhnoe Design Bureau – The RD-810 designer bureau.
- Yuzhmash – A multi-product machine-building company that's closely related to Yuzhnoe and would manufacture the RD-RD-810.
