= Long March 6C =

Launch vehicle

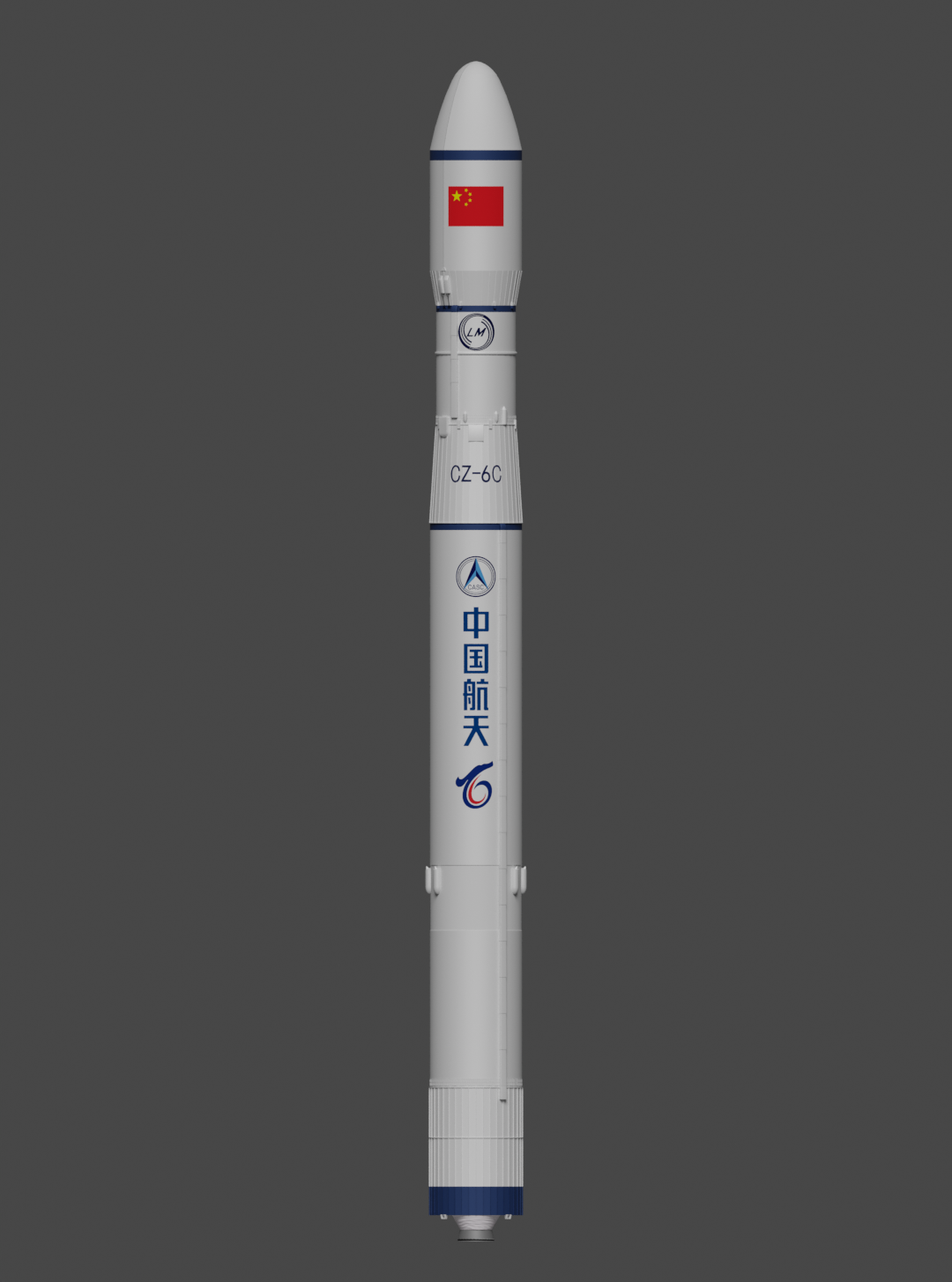
- Rendering of Long March 6C
- Function: Medium-lift launch vehicle
- Manufacturer: Shanghai Academy of Spaceflight Technology
- Country of origin: China

Size
- Height: 43 m (141 ft)
- Diameter: 3.35 m (11.0 ft)
- Mass: 217,000 kg (478,000 lb)
- Stages: 2

Capacity

Payload to LEO
- Mass: 4,500 kg (9,900 lb)

Payload to 500 km (310 mi) SSO
- Mass: 2,400 kg (5,300 lb)

Payload to 700 km (430 mi) SSO
- Mass: 2,000 kg (4,400 lb)

Associated rockets
- Family: Long March
- Comparable: Delta II; Vega-C; Angara 1.2

Launch history
- Status: Active
- Launch sites: Taiyuan, LA-9A
- Total launches: 2
- Success(es): 2
- First flight: 7 May 2024
- Last flight: 25 August 2026 (most recent)

First stage
- Diameter: 3.35 m (11.0 ft)
- Powered by: 2 × YF-100
- Maximum thrust: 2,376 kN (534,000 lb_{f})
- Specific impulse: SL: 300 kN (67,000 lb_{f}) vac: 335 kN (75,000 lb_{f})
- Propellant: RP-1/LOX

Second stage
- Diameter: 2.9 m (9 ft 6 in)
- Powered by: 1 × YF-115
- Maximum thrust: 180 kN (40,000 lb_{f})
- Specific impulse: vac: 341.5 kN (76,800 lb_{f})
- Propellant: RP-1/LOX

The Long March 6C (CZ-6C) (Chinese: 长征六号丙运载火箭) is a Chinese two-stage-to-orbit liquid-fueled launch vehicle designed and manufactured by Shanghai Academy of Spaceflight Technology, a subsidiary of China Aerospace Science and Technology Corporation. The rocket is a dual engine first stage variant of the Long March 6; alternatively, it may be considered to be a slightly shorter single stick variant of the Long March 6A. Both the first and second stages of the rocket use liquid oxygen and RP-1 propellants. It is employed to launch small and medium-sized military, civilian and commercial satellites to LEOs and Sun-synchronous orbits; it is capable of lifting 2,400 kg to 500 km SSOs.

The rocket undertook a successful maiden launch on 7 May 2024 at 13:21 UTC from North China's Taiyuan Satellite Launch Center.

A rideshare launch opportunity by Long March 6C was sold at an online auction in July 2023, with bidding prices starting at ¥87,000/kg.

== List of launches ==
Flight number	Serial number	Date (UTC)	Launch site	Payload	Orbit	Result
1	Y2	7 May 2024; 03:21	Taiyuan, LA-9A	Haiwangxing 01, Zhixing-1C; KuanfuGuangxue, Gaofen Shipin	SSO	Success
2	Y1	25 August 2026; 03:21	Taiyuan, LA-9A	BaYi-04, JingAn MengXiang-01, Zhongke-14, Zhongke-15, Lingzhi-09, GISTDA Cubesat 1 and JAMX01	SSO	Success
3	Y3	29 November 2026; 03:50	Taiyuan, LA-9A	Unknown Payload	LEO	Planned
