= RD-864 =

Soviet rocket engine

RD-864 (РД-864)
- Country of origin: Soviet Union
- First flight: 31 October 1977
- Designer: Yuzhnoye Design Bureau
- Manufacturer: Yuzhmash
- Application: Upper stage
- Associated LV: R-36M UTTKh and Dnepr
- Successor: RD-869

Liquid-fuel engine
- Propellant: N_{2}O_{4} / UDMH
- Mixture ratio: 1.8
- Cycle: Gas-generator

Configuration
- Chamber: 4

Performance
- Thrust: High thrust mode: 20.2 kN (4,500 lb_{f}); Low thrust mode: 8.45 kN (1,900 lb_{f})
- Chamber pressure: High thrust mode: 4.1 MPa (590 psi); Low thrust mode: 1.7 MPa (250 psi)
- Specific impulse: High thrust mode: 309 s (3.03 km/s); Low thrust mode: 298 s (2.92 km/s)
- Burn time: Up to 600 seconds
- Restarts: Up to 25
- Gimbal range: ±55°

Dimensions
- Length: 4,020 mm (13 ft 2 in)
- Diameter: 1,420 mm (4 ft 8 in)
- Dry mass: 199 kg (439 lb)

Used in
- R-36M UTTKh and Dnepr third stage

RD-869 (РД-869)
- Country of origin: Soviet Union
- First flight: March 1986
- Designer: Yuzhnoye Design Bureau
- Manufacturer: Yuzhmash
- Application: Upper Stage
- Associated LV: R-36M2
- Predecessor: RD-864

Liquid-fuel engine
- Propellant: N_{2}O_{4} / UDMH
- Mixture ratio: 1.8
- Cycle: Gas-generator

Configuration
- Chamber: 4

Performance
- Thrust: High thrust mode: 20.47 kN (4,600 lb_{f}); Low thrust mode: 8.58 kN (1,930 lb_{f})
- Chamber pressure: High thrust mode: 4.1 MPa (590 psi); Low thrust mode: 1.7 MPa (250 psi)
- Specific impulse: High thrust mode: 313 s (3.07 km/s); Low thrust mode: 302.3 s (2.965 km/s)
- Burn time: Up to 700 seconds
- Restarts: Up to 50
- Gimbal range: ±55°

Dimensions
- Length: 4,020 mm (13 ft 2 in)
- Diameter: 1,420 mm (4 ft 8 in)
- Dry mass: 196 kg (432 lb)

Used in
- R-36M2 third stage

The RD-864 (Russian: Ракетный Двигатель-864, romanized: Raketnyy Dvigatel-864, lit. 'Rocket Engine 864', GRAU index: 15D177) is a Soviet liquid-fuel rocket engine burning a hypergolic mixture of unsymmetrical dimethylhydrazine (UDMH) fuel with dinitrogen tetroxide (N_{2}O_{4}) oxidizer in a gas generator combustion cycle. It has a four combustion chambers that provide thrust vector control by gimbaling each nozzle in a single axis ±55°. It is used on the third stage of the R-36M UTTKh (GRAU index: 15A18) and Dnepr. For the R-36M2 (GRAU index: 15A18M), an improved version, the RD-869 (GRAU index: 15D300) was developed.

== History ==
When the Soviet military developed an improved version of the R-36M ICBM, Yangel's OKB-586 developed a new engine for the third stage, the RD-864. Developed between 1976 and 1978 it flew for the first time on October 31, 1977. With the START I and START II the some 150 R-36M and R-36M UTTKh were retired and to be destroyed by 2007. So, a civilian application was looked for and during the 1990s, Yuzhnoe Design Bureau (the R-36M designer) successfully developed the Dnepr launch vehicle. It flew for the first time on April 21, 1999, and as of June 2016 it is still operational. So, while the production of the RD-864 has long since been finished, the engine is still to this day operational.

The RD-869 was an improved version for the most powerful Soviet ICBM ever, the R-36M2 (15A18M). It had improved efficiency, restart capability and burn life over the RD-864. As of January 2016 there are still 46 operational R-36M2 (RS-20V, SS-18) and thus the RD-869 is still in service, if out of production.

== Versions ==
There are two versions of this engine:

- RD-864 (GRAU Index: 15D177): First developed as the third stage engine for the R-36M UTTKh (15A18) ICBM and, by extension, on the Dnepr launch vehicle.
- RD-869 (GRAU Index: 15D300): An improved version of the RD-864. It has improved efficiency, restart capability and burn life. It is used on the R-36M2 (15A18M).

== See also ==
- RD-843 - A single chamber version of the RD-864
- R-36M UTTKh - The most powerful ever Soviet ICBM for which the RD-864/869 engines were created.
- Dnepr - A Ukrainian small rocket project that uses the RD-864.
- Yuzhnoe Design Bureau - The RD-864/869 designer.
- Yuzhmash - A multi-product machine-building company that's closely related to Yuzhnoe and manufactures the RD-864/869.
