= YF-100 =

Chinese rocket engine

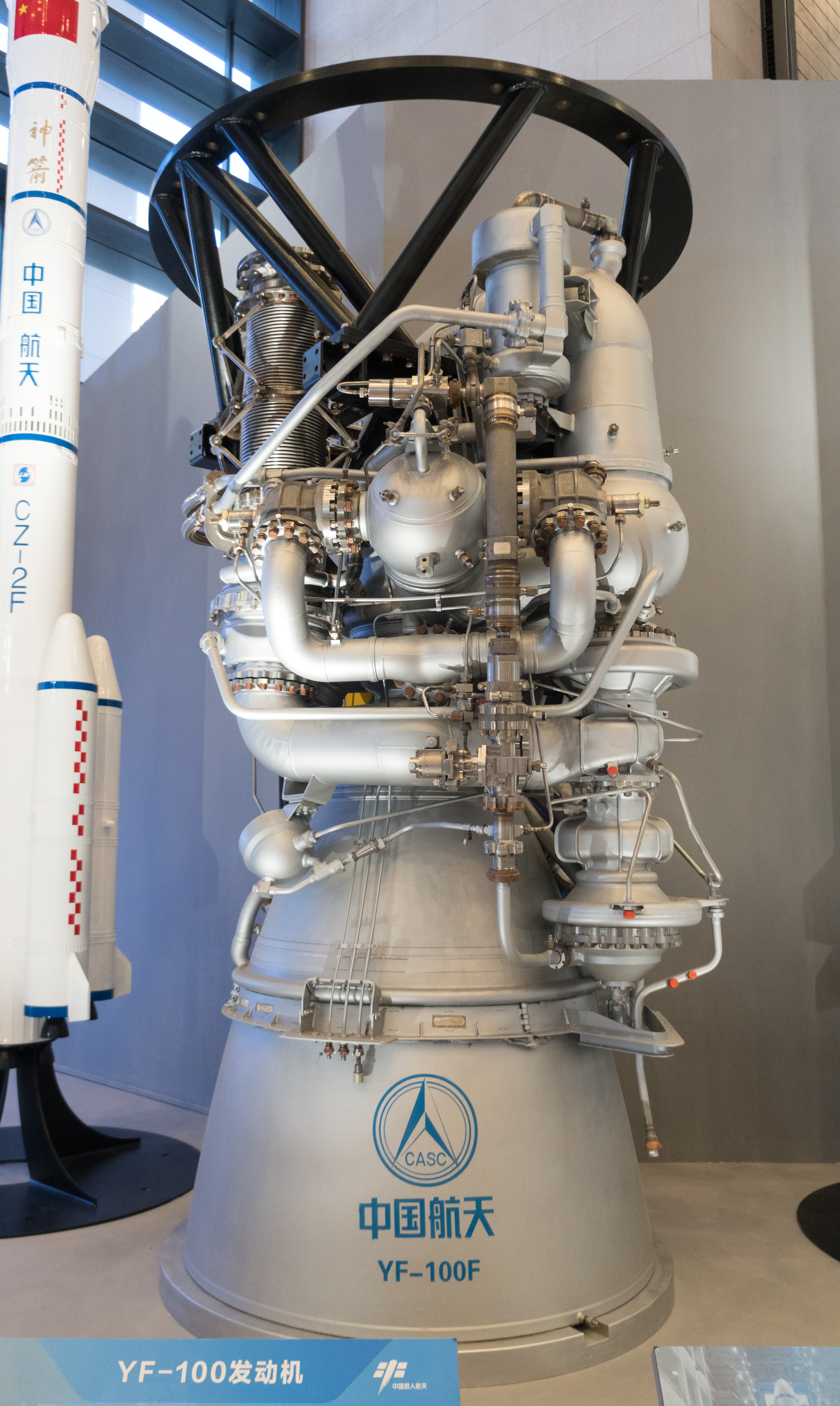
- YF-100 rocket engine
- Country of origin: China
- First flight: Long March 6 inaugural flight (2015-09-20)
- Designer: Academy of Aerospace Liquid Propulsion Technology
- Associated LV: Long March 5 Long March 6 Long March 7 Long March 8 Long March 10; Long March 12
- Status: In service

Liquid-fuel engine
- Propellant: LOX / RP-1
- Mixture ratio: 2.6 (±10%) (adjustable)
- Cycle: Oxidizer-rich staged combustion cycle

Configuration
- Chamber: 1
- Nozzle ratio: 35

Performance
- Thrust, vacuum: 1,340 kN (300,000 lbf)
- Thrust, sea-level: 1,200 kN (270,000 lbf)
- Throttle range: 65%~105%
- Chamber pressure: 18 MPa (2,600 psi)
- Specific impulse, vacuum: 335 seconds (3.29 km/s)
- Specific impulse, sea-level: 300 seconds (2.9 km/s)
- Burn time: 155 s (estimated)

Dimensions
- Diameter: 1.338 metres (52.7 in)

Used in
- Long March 5 K-3-1 and K-2-1 boosters, Long March 6, Long March 6A, Long March 6C, and Long March 12 first stage and Long March 7, Long March 7A, Long March 8, and Long March 8A first stage and boosters.

The YF-100 is a Chinese liquid rocket engine burning LOX and kerosene in an oxidizer-rich staged combustion cycle. The engine is designed for use on the first stage of the Chinese government's new generation of launch vehicles, the Long March 5, the Long March 6 and the Long March 7. The engine's maiden flight, on the Long March 6, took place on September 20, 2015.

Development of the engine began in the 2000s, along with its sibling, the smaller YF-115, which would power the upper stages of the Long March 6 and Long March 7 rockets. Testing was directed by the China National Space Administration (CNSA) commencing in 2005. Development works are mainly carried out by the Xi'an Aerospace Propulsion Institute. The engine had its first 300 seconds test fire in November 2007.

A high efficiency/high thrust environmentally-friendly rocket engine was always an objective within Programme 863 in the 1980s; however, Chinese industry was not mature enough at that time to produce such a rocket until they obtained RD-120s in early 1990 from Russia following the collapse of the USSR. It is the first Chinese rocket engine to adopt the staged-combustion cycle and the most powerful to date. During July 2012 the engine fired for 200 seconds generating 120 t (260,000 lb) of thrust. On May 28, 2012, the National Defense Science and Industry Bureau certified the engine.

== Technical Description ==
The YF-100 is a pump-fed oxidizer rich staged combustion rocket engine. It has adjustable thrust and variable mixture ratio. Its preburner burns all the LOX mass flow with a bit of kerosene to generate hot gas that powers the single turbine. The turbopump is a single-shaft design, with a single-stage oxygen pump and a dual-stage kerosene pump driven by the same turbine. It also has two low-pressure pumps that prevent cavitation. This arrangement is very similar to the RD-170 design. The engine has a heat exchanger to heat oxygen gas for LOX tank pressurization, and also supplies high-pressure kerosene as hydraulic fluid for the thrust vector control actuators.

The development required ten years of research, requiring the mastering of 70 key technologies, the development of 50 new materials, and the construction of 61 sets of engines with a combined total of more than 40,000 seconds of ignition time by 2013.

== Versions ==
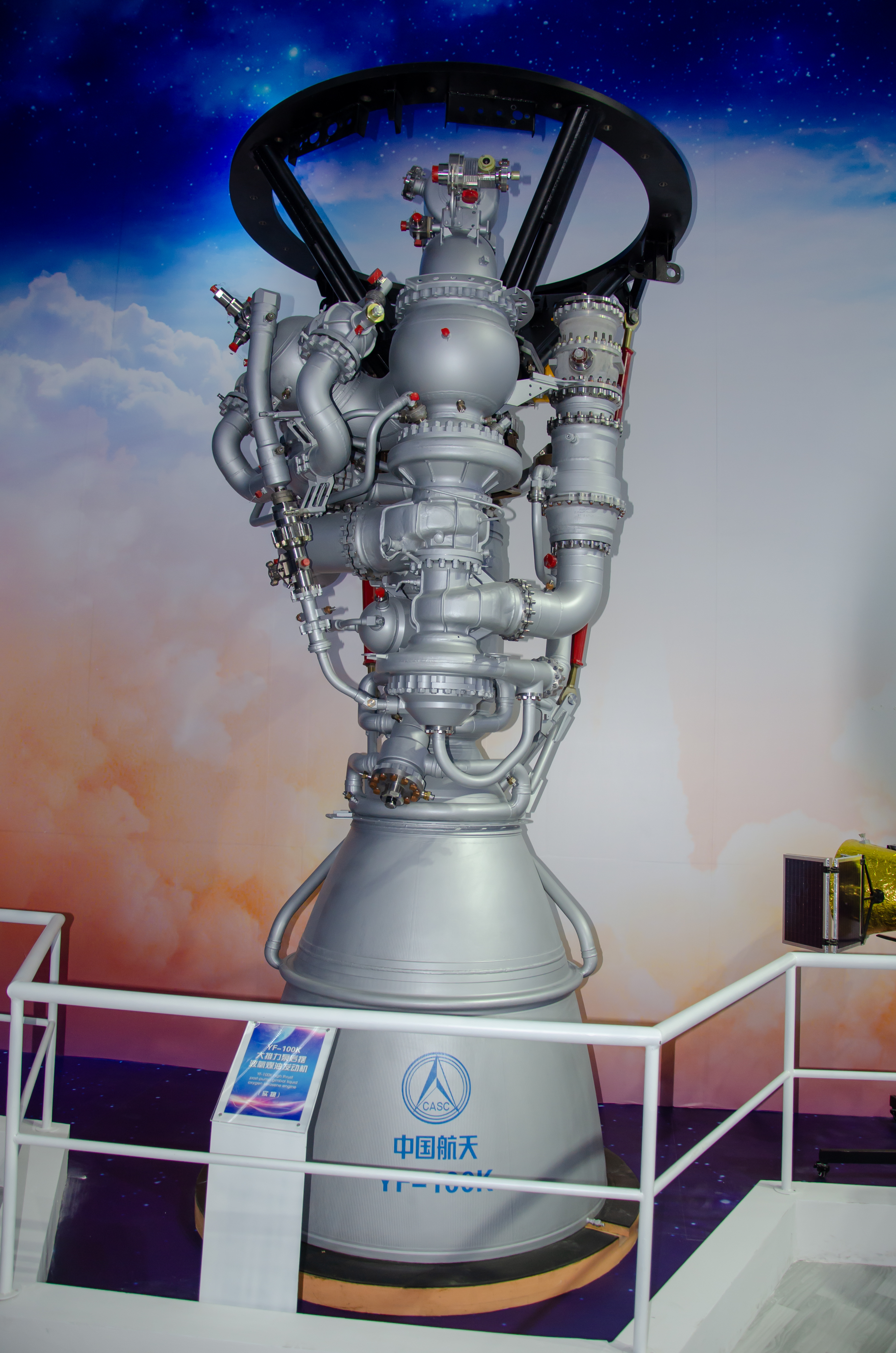
YF-100K displayed at Airshow China 2018

At least five different versions are known to exist.

- YF-100 (single-axis TVC): Version for the LM-5 and LM-7 boosters. This version of TVC has a single axis of gimbal.
- YF-100 (dual-axis TVC): Version for the LM-7 core. This version TVC has a dual-axis gimbal.
- YF-100GBI: A version used on the LM-6. Due to the rocket's single nozzle, a dual-axis gimbal can not control the rocket's roll. Therefore, this version of the engine diverts a portion of the preburner exhaust through two roll control nozzles on opposite sides of the launch vehicle at the expense of losing 0.30% of thrust and 0.79% of isp while the O/F ratio is increased by 0.12%.
- YF-100K: an uprated version of YF-100 used on the first stage cores of the Long March 12 and Long March 10.
- YF-100M: similar to the YF-100K but optimized for vacuum operation; a pair of YF-100M's will be used on the second stage of the Long March 10.

== See also ==
- LM-5 – Rocket family that uses the YF-100.
- LM-6 – Rocket family that uses the YF-100GBI.
- LM-7 – Rocket family that uses the YF-100.
- LM-10 – Rocket family that uses the YF-100K.
- LM-12 – Rocket family that uses the YF-100K.
- YF-115 – Upper stage Chinese rocket engine based on the YF-100 technology.
- RD-120 – Soviet rocket engine.
- RD-801 – Ukrainian rocket engine with very similar characteristics.
