= RD-843 =

Ukrainian single nozzle liquid propellant rocket engine

RD-843 (РД-843 / MEA)
- Country of origin: Ukraine
- First flight: 2012-02-13
- Designer: Yuzhnoye Design Bureau
- Manufacturer: Yuzhmash
- Application: Upper stage
- Associated LV: Vega, Vega C
- Predecessor: RD-869
- Status: In production

Liquid-fuel engine
- Propellant: N_{2}O_{4} / UDMH
- Mixture ratio: 2.0
- Cycle: Pressure-fed

Configuration
- Chamber: 1

Performance
- Thrust, vacuum: 2.452 kN (551 lb_{f})
- Chamber pressure: 2.04 MPa (296 psi)
- Specific impulse, vacuum: AVUM: 314.6 s (3.085 km/s); AVUM+: 315.8 s (3.097 km/s)
- Burn time: AVUM: Up to 612.5 seconds; AVUM+: Up to 924.8 seconds (Note: Engine can burn up to 612.5 seconds per burn. Maximum cumulative burn time of 924.8 seconds.)
- Restarts: Up to 5
- Gimbal range: ±10°

Dimensions
- Dry mass: 15.93 kg (35.1 lb)

Used in
- AVUM, AVUM+

The RD-843 is a Ukrainian single nozzle liquid propellant rocket engine. It burns a hypergolic mixture of unsymmetrical dimethylhydrazine (UDMH) fuel with dinitrogen tetroxide (N_{2}O_{4}) oxidizer. It is pressure-fed. It is rated for up to 5 restarts, and can gimbal up to 10 degrees in each direction.

It was developed by Yuzhnoye Design Bureau for Avio and is manufactured by Yuzhmash. It uses the RD-869 thrust chamber, the old Soviet ICBM SS-18 final stage engine from which it is evolved, and which was also designed by Yuzhnoye. The RD-843 ground test campaign included 74 tests, 140 ignitions, reaching a total of 8,201 seconds, which is approximately 12 service lives on 4 engines. As of June 2020 it has been successfully used on 14 orbital launches.

The Vega and Vega C uses it as the main engine on its AVUM (Attitude & Vernier Upper Module) fourth stage which it calls the MEA (short for Main Engine AVUM).

== See also ==
- AVUM - The upper stage of the Vega rocket that uses the RD-843 as its main engine.
- Vega - The ESA small-lift rocket that uses AVUM.
- Yuzhnoe Design Bureau - The RD-843 designer bureau.
- Yuzhmash - A multi-product machine-building company that's closely related to Yuzhnoe and manufactures the RD-843.
