= Mayak (rocket family) =

Ukrainian space launch vehicle

Mayak is a new family of Ukrainian launch vehicles under development by the Pivdenne, which would be manufactured by Pivdenmash.

== History ==
The family is built in a modular fashion on the basis of a single line of main engines with thrust of roughly 120 or 200 tonnes-force (1,200 or 2,000 kN) for the first stage (RD-801 or RD-810) and 10 tonnes-force (98 kN) for the upper stage (RD-809K derived from RD-8). Engines, control systems and ground equipment are largely derived from components of existing rocket families Zenit and Tsyklon.

== Configurations ==
The Mayak family is designed to cover small-lift, medium-lift and heavy-lift requirements. Published parameters of various configurations are:

Version	Mayak-L1	Mayak-L2	Mayak-M1	Mayak-M2	Mayak-H3	Mayak-H5
Length (m)	27.3	36.9	47.4	61.0	63.0	64.0
Diameter (m)	2.7	3.0	3.9			
Launch mass (t)	95	165	370	495 / 515	1218 / 1236	2010 / 2015
Number of stages	2			2 / 3		
Stage 1 engines	1 × RD-801	2 × RD-801	2 × RD-810	4 × RD-810	12 × RD-810	20 × RD-810
Stage 2 engines	1 × RD-809K	2 × RD-809K	4 × RD-809K	1 × RD-801B		
Optional stage 3 booster	—N/a			RD-809K		
Propellants	LOX / kerosene					
Payload to LEO (t)	1.5	3	8.2	15.1 / –	45.5 / –	70.1 / –
Payload to GTO (t)	–	–	2.4	– / 6.5	16 / 19	25 / 30.2
