= RD-263 =

Rocket engine

RD-263 (РД-263)
- Country of origin: Soviet Union
- Date: 1969-1975
- Designer: Energomash, V.Glushko
- Manufacturer: PA Yuzhmash
- Associated LV: R-36M and Dnepr
- Status: Out of production

Liquid-fuel engine
- Propellant: N_{2}O_{4} / UDMH
- Mixture ratio: 2.67
- Cycle: Oxidizer-rich staged combustion

Configuration
- Chamber: 1

Performance
- Thrust, vacuum: 1,128 kilonewtons (254,000 lbf)
- Thrust, sea-level: 1,040 kilonewtons (230,000 lbf)
- Chamber pressure: 20.6 megapascals (2,990 psi)
- Specific impulse, vacuum: 318 s (3.12 km/s)
- Specific impulse, sea-level: 293 s (2.87 km/s)
- Gimbal range: 7°

Dimensions
- Length: 2,150 millimetres (85 in)
- Diameter: 1,080 millimetres (43 in)
- Dry mass: 870 kilograms (1,920 lb)

Used in
- R-36M and R-36MUTTKh core stage (15А14 and 15A18)

The RD-263 (Russian: Ракетный Двигатель-263, romanized: Raketnyy Dvigatel-263, lit. 'Rocket Engine 263', GRAU index: 15D117) is a liquid-fuel rocket engine, burning a hypergolic mixture of unsymmetrical dimethylhydrazine (UDMH) fuel with dinitrogen tetroxide (N_{2}O_{4}) oxidizer in the oxidizer rich staged combustion cycle. Four RD-263 engines form a propulsion module RD-264 (GRAU index: 15D119). For the R-36M KB Yuzhnoye only ordered the first stage propulsion to Energomash, instead of both stages, arguing that they were overworked with the RD-270 development. By April 1970 Yuzhnoye was getting the engine documentation. By the end of 1972 Energomash started to test fire the engines in its own test stand. And by September 1973 the engine was certified for flight. While the engine is out of production, the ICBM as well as the Dnepr remain operational as of 2015.

== Versions ==
The basic engine has been used for the

- RD-263 (GRAU index: 15D117): Initial version used on the R-36M and R-36MUTTKh first stage (15А14 and 15A18).
- RD-268 (GRAU index: 15D168): Variation used on the MR-UR-100 (15А15) and MR-UR-100UTTKh (15A16) first stage.
- RD-273 (AKA RD-263F): Improved version based on the RD-263F upgrade project. Version used on the R-36M2 (15A18M) and (15A18M2) first stage.

RD-0210 family of engines
Engine	RD-263	RD-268	RD-273
AKA	15D117	15D168	RD-263F
Propulsion module	RD-264	N/A	RD-274
Development	1969-1975	1970-1976	1982-1988
Engine type	Liquid oxidizer rich staged combustion using N_{2}O_{4}/UDMH propellant with an O/F ratio of 2.67		
Combustion chamber pressure	20.6 MPa (2,990 psi)	22.6 MPa (3,280 psi)	22.6 MPa (3,280 psi)
Thrust, vacuum	1,130 kN (250,000 lbf)	1,240 kN (280,000 lbf)	1,240 kN (280,000 lbf)
Thrust, sea level	1,040 kN (230,000 lbf)	1,130 kN (250,000 lbf)	1,130 kN (250,000 lbf)
I_{sp}, vacuum	318s	318.5s	318s
I_{sp}, sea level	293s	295.6s	296s
Length	2,150 mm (85 in)	2,150 mm (85 in)	2,150 mm (85 in)
Width	1,080 mm (43 in)	1,083 mm (42.6 in)	1,080 mm (43 in)
Dry weight	870 kg (1,920 lb)	770 kg (1,700 lb)	Unknown
Use	R-36M (15А14) and R-36MUTTKh (15A18) core stage	MR-UR-100 (15А15) and MR-UR-100UTTKh (15A16) first stage	R-36M2 (15A18M) and (15A18M2) first stage
Status	Out of production	Retired	Retired
References			

== Modules ==
Some of these engines were bundled into modules of multiple engines. The relevant modules and auxiliary engines are:

- RD-264 (GRAU Index 15D119): A module comprising four RD-263. Propulsion module of the R-36M and R-36MUTTKh first stage (15А14 and 15A18).
- RD-274 (GRAU Index): A module comprising four RD-273. Propulsion module of the R-36M2 (15A18M) and (15A18M2) first stage.

== See also ==
- R-36M - ICBM for which this engine was originally developed.
- Dnepr - launch vehicle that is a repurposed R-36MUTTKh.
- LR-87, twin-chamber American rocket engine family used on the Titan series of US launch vehicles.
- Rocket engine using liquid fuel
