= RD-0255 =

Soviet upper stage rocket engine

RD-0256 (РД-0256)
- Country of origin: Soviet Union
- First flight: 1981-12-27
- Designer: OKB-154
- Associated LV: R-36M and Dnepr
- Predecessor: RD-0229
- Status: In Service

Liquid-fuel engine
- Propellant: N_{2}O_{4} / UDMH
- Mixture ratio: 2.6
- Cycle: Oxidizer Rich Staged combustion

Configuration
- Chamber: 1

Performance
- Thrust: 755 kilonewtons (170,000 lbf)

Used in
- RD-0255 Propulsion Module

RD-0257 (РД-0257)
- Country of origin: USSR
- First flight: 1981-12-27
- Designer: OKB-154
- Associated LV: R-36M and Dnepr
- Predecessor: RD-0230
- Status: In Service

Liquid-fuel engine
- Propellant: N_{2}O_{4} / UDMH
- Cycle: Gas Generator

Configuration
- Chamber: 4

Used in
- RD-0255 Propulsion Module

The RD-0255 (Russian: Ракетный Двигатель-0255, romanized: Raketnyy Dvigatel-0255, lit. 'Rocket Engine 0255') is a propulsion module composed of an RD-0256 main engine and a RD-0257 Vernier thruster. Both are liquid-fuel rocket engines, burning a hypergolic mixture of unsymmetrical dimethylhydrazine (UDMH) fuel with dinitrogen tetroxide (N_{2}O_{4}) oxidizer. The RD-0256 main engine operates in the oxidizer rich staged combustion cycle, while the vernier RD-0257 uses the simpler gas generator cycle. It was used on the R-36MUTTKh (GRAU:15A18) and R-36M2 (GRAU:15A18M). Subsequently, it has been in the Dnepr second stage and as of 2016 it is still in active service.

The RD-0256 is an improved version of the RD-0228 (GRAU: 15D84), itself composed of an RD-0229 (GRAU: 15D84) main engine and a RD-0230 (GRAU: 15D79) vernier engine. The RD-0228 was developed between 1967 and 1974 for the first generation of R-36M (GRAU: 15D83) ICBM second stage, but was replaced on subsequent iterations by the RD-0256. The RD-0228 debut was on January 21, 1973. With the START I and START II the RD-0228 was retired and its successor, the RD-0256, only continued as the Dnepr.

== See also ==
- R-36M – A Soviet ICBM that used the RD-0228 and RD-0255.
- Dnepr – Small launch vehicle designed by Yuzhmash that uses the RD-0255.
- KBKhA – The RD-0228 and RD-0255 design bureau.
- Vernier Engine
- Rocket engine
