= RD Amross =

American limited liability company

- Company type: Limited liability company

RD AMROSS, a limited liability company, is a U.S. joint venture between Pratt & Whitney of West Palm Beach, Florida and NPO Energomash of Khimki, Russia based in Jupiter, Florida.

NPO Energomash manufactures the RD-180 rocket engine for RD AMROSS, and provides designing, manufacturing, testing and other services for liquid propulsion rocket engines. The RD-180 provides the main thrust on the Atlas V launch vehicle made by the United Launch Alliance.

The first RD-180 engine, produced by NPO Energomash, was delivered to Lockheed Martin Astronautics in Denver, CO, in December 2000. Lockheed Martin completed testing of the engine in December 2001. The liquid oxygen and kerosene (RP-1) engine met all performance requirements for both government and commercial missions. The maiden launch of the Atlas V rocket equipped with the RD-180 engine occurred in 2002.

Energomash committed to delivering a total of 101 RD-180s for the fixed price of one billion dollars.

Under RD AMROSS, Pratt & Whitney is licensed to produce the RD-180 in the United States. Originally, production of the RD-180 in the US was scheduled to begin in 2008, but this did not happen. According to a 2005 GAO Assessment of Selected Major Weapon Programs, Pratt & Whitney planned to start building the engine in the United States with a first military launch by 2012. This, too, did not happen. In 2014, the Defense Department estimated that it would require approximately $1 billion and five years to begin US domestic manufacture of the RD-180 engine.

In late April 2014, SpaceX filed a complaint seeking an injunction against the continued import of the Russian made rocket motor as a result of the US sanctions against Russia over its policies and practices in Ukraine. The US Federal Court of Appeals granted the injunction. On May 8, 2014, the injunction was lifted, and imports were again permitted.

== See also ==
- Evolved Expendable Launch Vehicle
- Atlas V
