= MR-UR-100 Sotka =

Strategic missile complex 15P015 (MR-UR-100) with 15A15 missile
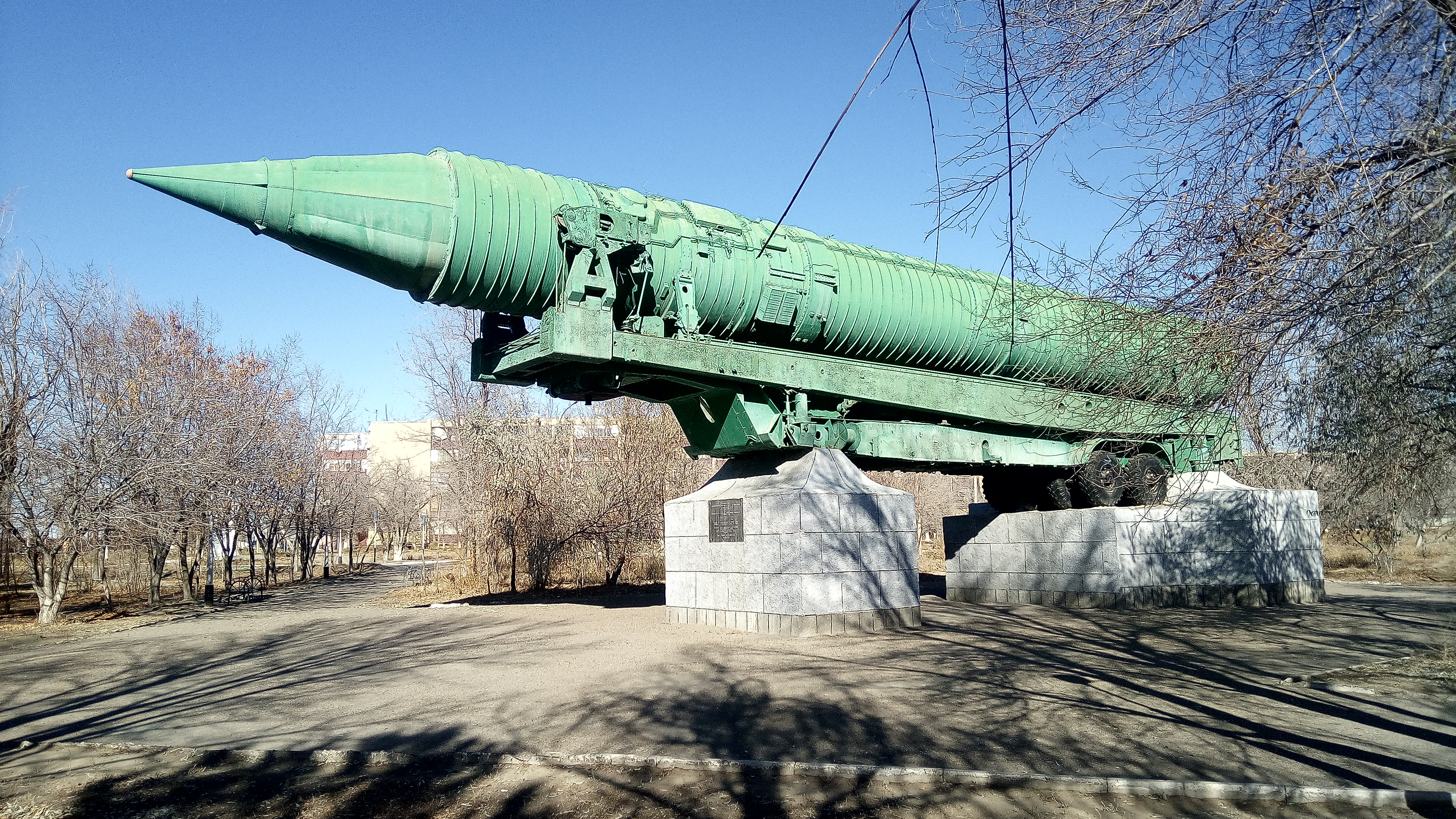
- Type: ICBM

Service history
- In service: 1975–1995
- Used by: Soviet Union, Russian Federation

Production history
- Manufacturer: design by OKB-586

Specifications
- Mass: 71.2 tonnes
- Length: 22,510 mm
- Diameter: 2,250 mm
- Warhead: 1 or 4
- Blast yield: 1×3.4Mt or 4×0.4 Mt
- Engine: two-stage liquid fuel + one solid fuel First Stage: 1x RD-268 main engine + 1x RD-863 (15D167) engine Second Stage: 1x RD-862 (15D169) engine Third Stage: one 15D171 solid fuel engine
- Operational range: from 1000 km to: 10250 km with MIRV; 10320 km with single warhead
- Guidance system: inertial
- Accuracy: CEP 500 metres at 10000 km

The MR-UR-100 Sotka (Russian: МР УР-100) was a MIRV-warhead intercontinental ballistic missile (ICBM) developed and deployed by the Soviet Union from 1978 to 1993. The missile was given the NATO reporting name SS-17 Spanker and was built under the Soviet industry designation 15A15. An alternative designation for the missile is the UR-100MR. It was nicknamed Sotka (Russian: Сотка), from the Russian for "hundred."

== Development ==
OKB-586 developed the MR-UR-100 project. The purpose was to develop a MIRV capable replacement for the existing UR-100 missiles in service. While designed to fit into existing UR-100 silos, it still required some modification of existing silos to accommodate the new missile, due to its requirement for a cold launch system.

The development of "modernized UR-100" was authorized on 19 August 1970 (document No.682-218) and assigned to both OKB-586 and TsKBM (builder of UR-100). The design bureau conducted flight tests from 1971 through 1974. Deployment commenced in December 1978. The more advanced MR-UR-100UTTh version began development in 1979, with flight tests from 1977 through 1979. The new missiles had completely replaced the original version by 1983, at which time the Soviets fielded 270 launchers. From there the number of launchers declined, and by the 1991 START I Treaty they were down to 76. All were scheduled for dismantling and removed from the inventory.

== In fiction ==
In the historical fiction novel The Third World War, written by a team of former military officers led by General Sir John Hackett, a warhead from a MR-UR-100 detonates 3500m above Birmingham, England at 10:30 hours GMT on 20 August 1985. The explosion kills 300,000 people within minutes, with a further 250,000 likely to die in the aftermath.

== Operator ==
Soviet Union
The Strategic Rocket Forces were the only operators of the Sotka.

== See also ==
- List of missiles
- List of rockets
