= RD-701 =

Proposed Soviet rocket engine

RD-701 (РД-701)
- Country of origin: USSR/Russia
- Date: late 1980s
- Manufacturer: Energomash
- Successor: RD-704
- Status: Experimental

Liquid-fuel engine
- Propellant: Mode 1: LOX / LH2&RP-1; Mode 2: LOX / LH2
- Cycle: staged combustion

Performance
- Thrust, vacuum: Mode 1: 900,000 lbf (4 MN); Mode 2: 357,000 lbf (1.6 MN)
- Thrust, sea-level: Mode 1: 714,000 lbf (3.2 MN)
- Chamber pressure: Mode 1: 30 MPa (4,400 psi); Mode 2: 15 MPa (2,200 psi)
- Specific impulse, vacuum: Mode 1: 415 s (4.07 km/s); Mode 2: 460 s (4.5 km/s)
- Specific impulse, sea-level: Mode 1: 330 s (3.2 km/s)

Dimensions
- Diameter: 94 in (2,400 mm) (1 nozzle)
- Dry mass: 4,240 lb (1,923 kg)

The RD-701 (Russian: Раке́тный дви́гатель 701, Rocket Engine 701) was a liquid-fuel rocket engine proposed by Energomash, Russia (USSR at that time). It was briefly proposed to propel the reusable MAKS space plane, but the project was cancelled shortly before the end of USSR. The RD-701 would have been a tripropellant engine that used a staged combustion cycle with afterburning of oxidizer-rich hot turbine gas. The RD-701 would have had two modes. Mode 1 used three components: LOX as an oxidizer and a fuel mixture of RP-1 / LH2 which is used in the lower atmosphere. Mode 2 would have also used LOX, with LH2 as fuel in vacuum where atmospheric influence is negligible.

The use of less dense fuel components at maximum efficiency conditions allows minimizing the volume of fuel tanks and subsequently their mass down to 30%. The RD-701 proposal was developed into another proposal, the RD-704, which featured a single combustion chamber.

Contrary to information presented in some English-language sources, the RD-701 was never constructed or tested, although a smaller test-stand engine was built and tested as part of development.

== Specifications ==
The RD-701 is a two chamber engine. It can operate in two modes.

The RD-701 has two preburners per combustion chamber, both of which run oxygen-rich. One is used to pump kerosene and oxygen, the other is used to pump hydrogen and oxygen.

In low-altitude mode one, a single preburner burns kerosene with excess oxygen. Hydrogen is injected into the main combustion chamber and burns with the oxygen rich preburner exhaust. The use of dual fuels enables greater thrust and impulse density, allowing for smaller, lighter tanks. In this mode, the engine produces 4 MN of thrust, using 73.7 kg/s (12.6% of propellant mass) of kerosene, 29.5 kg/s (6% of propellant mass) of hydrogen, and 388.4 kg/s (81.4% of propellant mass) of oxygen, achieving a with a specific impulse of 415 s.

In high-altitude mode two, the preburner used to pump kerosene is shut down, and the other is switched to burning hydrogen. A small amount of kerosene is still used to ensure oxygen is effectively atomised. Gases from the preburner combined with additional hydrogen in the combustion chamber. In this mode it burns 27.4 kg/s of hydrogen, and 148 kg/s of oxygen. Thrust reduces to 1.6 MN, but the specific impulse increases to 460 s.

== See also ==
- RD-170 - RP-1/LOX Russian engine
- RD-0120 - LH2/LOX Russian engine
