= NPO Energomash =

Russian rocket engine manufacturer

- Native name: НПО Энергомаш имени академика В. П. Глушко
- Romanized name: NPO Energomash named after “V. P. Glushko”
- Formerly: OKB-456
- Industry: Aerospace industry Space industry Defense industry Rocket engines
- Founded: (1946; 80 years ago) Khimki, Soviet Union
- Founder: Valentin Petrovich Glushko
- Headquarters: Moscow region, Russia
- Products: Rocket engines; RD-170; RD-180; Launch vehicles; Ballistic missiles
- Revenue: $182 million (2016)
- Operating income: $59.7 million (2016)
- Net income: $48 million (2016)
- Total assets: $47 million (2016)
- Total equity: $126 million (2016)
- Number of employees: 5500 (2009)
- Parent: Roscosmos
- Website: Official Website

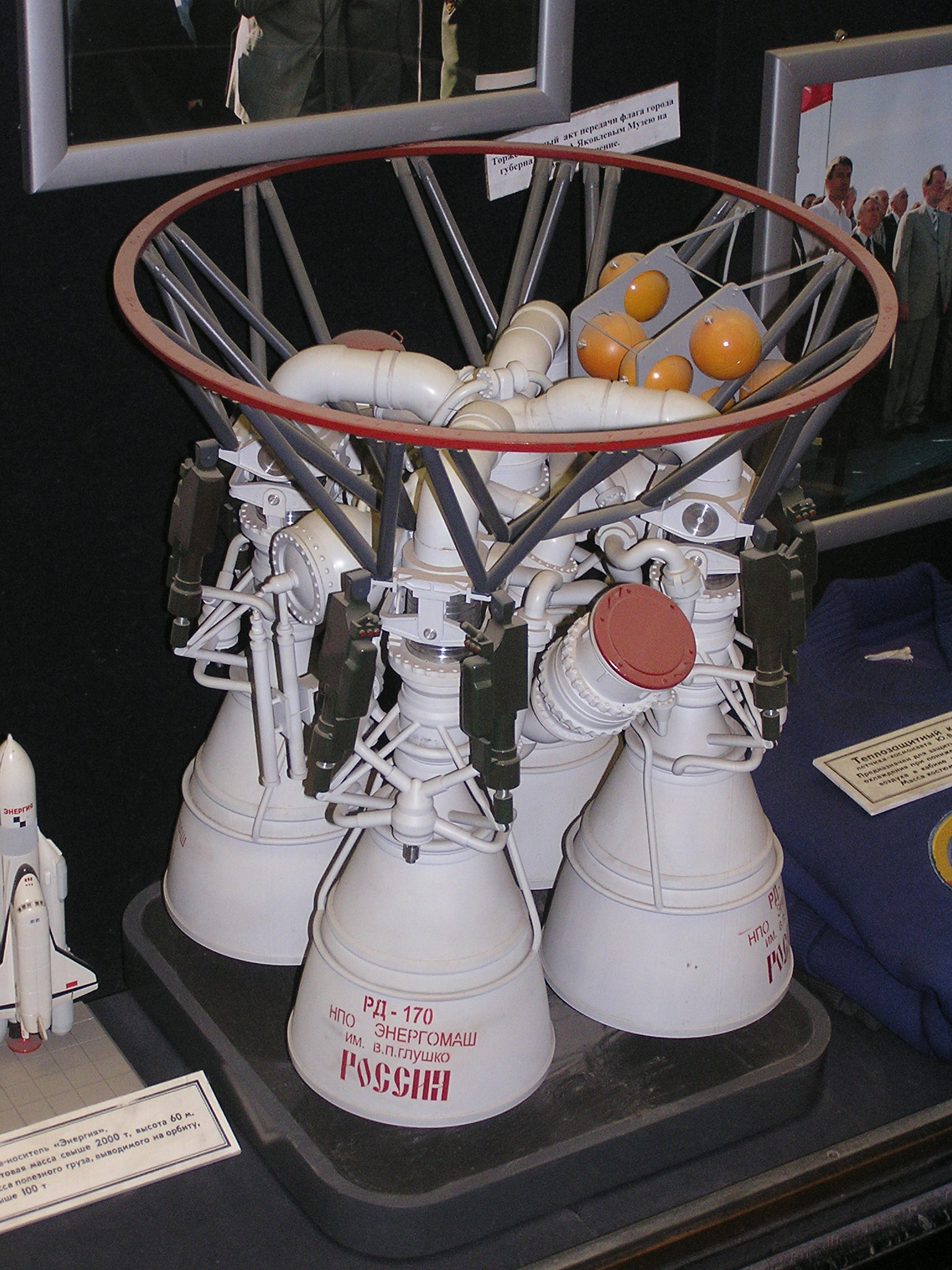
Model of the RD-170 Engine developed by NPO Energomash.

NPO Energomash "V. P. Glushko" is a major Russian rocket engine manufacturer. The company primarily develops and produces liquid propellant rocket engines. Energomash originates from the Soviet design bureau OKB-456, which was founded in 1946. NPO Energomash acquired its current name on May 15, 1991, in honor of its former chief designer Valentin Glushko.

Energomash is noted for its long history of large scale LOX/Kerosene engine development. Notable examples are the RD-107/RD-108 engines used on the R-7, Molniya and Soyuz rocket families, and the RD-170, RD-171 and RD-180 engines used on the Energia, Zenit and Atlas V launch vehicles.

As of July 2013, the company remained largely owned by the federal government of Russia, but RSC Energia owned approximately 14% of the total shares. As of 2009, NPO Energomash employed approximately 5500 workers at its headquarters in Khimki, Moscow and its satellite facilities in Samara, Perm, and St. Petersburg.

On 4 August 2016, the company announced that it would launch a new plant by December 2016.

== History ==
Valentin Petrovich Glushko was appointed chief designer of the newly founded OKB-456 design bureau on July 3, 1946. The company was quickly tasked with the production of a Russian copy of the German V2 rocket engine, under the supervision of Glushko and 234 German designers added to the company in October, 1946. At the end of that year, OKB-456 took up residence in an aviation factory near the city of Khimki, just outside Moscow. Here, the bureau constructed facilities to build and test fire its engines. The RD-100 performed admirably, and low-pressure LOX/Ethanol engine development continued, in the form of the RD-102 and RD-103. However, the development of high-pressure engine technology allowed propellants with a higher energy density to be used, and so LOX/Kerosene quickly replaced LOX/Ethanol as the propellant of choice.

In 2013, the Russian government began a major effort to renationalize the Russian space sector, and created United Rocket and Space Corporation (URSC) to consolidate its space holdings. In December 2013 President Putin issued a presidential decree setting up the URSC corporation. The decree stipulated that the corporation will take over manufacturing facilities. The industry reorganization continued into 2014 with a Sberbank cooperation agreement.

== Storable propellants and hypergols ==
In 1954, the development and success of the LOX/Kerosene RD-107 and RD-108 engines allowed the company to expand its engine development work further. The RD-214 engine, using a storable mixture of Nitric Acid and Kerosene, was developed for ballistic missiles with a short readiness time requirement. The RD-214 was soon superseded by the RD-216 and later variants, which used a hypergolic combination of UDMH and Nitric Acid. This line of development later led to the highly successful UDMH/N_{2}O_{4} engines RD-253 and RD-275 used on the Proton launch vehicles – these were the most powerful hypergolic engine of its time, and remains in production to the current day.

== High pressure engines ==
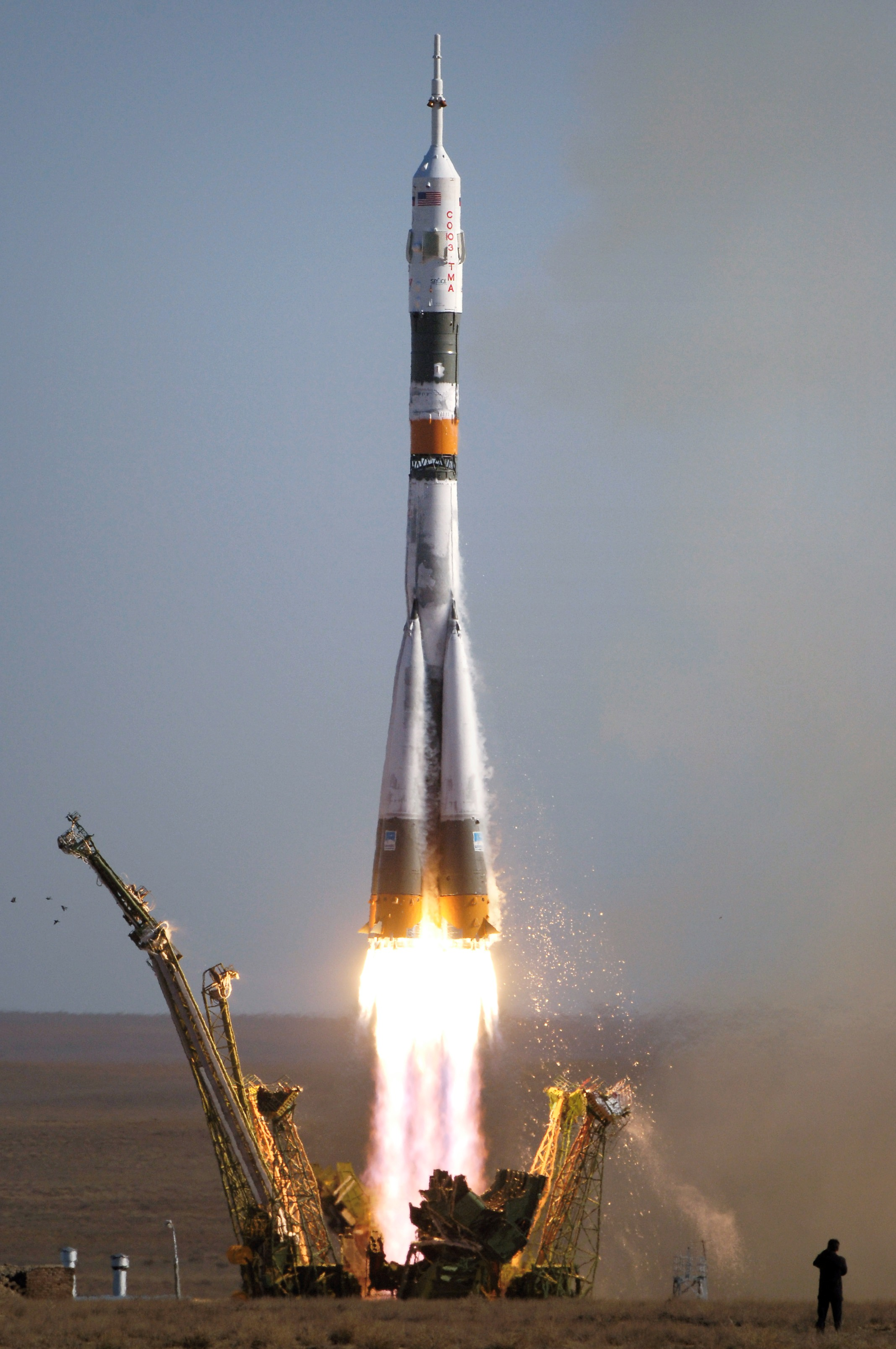
RD-107 engines lifting a Soyuz-FG rocket.

The RD-107 and RD-108 engines developed from 1954-1957 were extremely reliable and widely used. However, DB Energomash (renamed from the original OKB designation in 1967) saw great potential in the development of LOX/Kerosene engines with a higher chamber pressure. This presented many challenges to the engine designers, most notably the development of a turbopump which could deliver enough propellant to keep the engine running at a pressure high enough to maintain combustion stability. The resulting engine, developed in the early 1980s, was the RD-170, which runs at a chamber pressure of 24.5 megapascals (3,550 pounds per square inch) and produces 7,550 kilonewtons (1,700,000 pounds-force) of thrust at a sea-level specific impulse of 309 sec, and 7,903 kilonewtons (1,777,000 pounds-force) of thrust at a vacuum specific impulse of 337 sec — one of the most efficient and powerful LOX/Kerosene engines in the world.

== Current work ==
Variants of the RD-170 are still in use today on such vehicles as the Zenit 3SL used by Sea Launch. The modern Soyuz rocket uses updated versions of the RD-107 and RD-108 engines. The RD-180 engine, developed with Pratt & Whitney Rocketdyne through the RD AMROSS partnership, is a direct descendant of the RD-170 line and is used as the propulsion system for the first stage of Atlas V. The most current engine listed on the NPO Energomash website is the single-chamber RD-191, developed for the Angara and Baikal launch vehicles.

NPO Energomash works with other Russian companies (Keldysh Research Center and KBKhA), and in cooperation with European companies on the Volga rocket engine project.

The company continues to research and explore new engine concepts, such as the tripropellant, bi-modal engines of the RD-700 family (RD-701 and RD-704).

On 1 June 2016, the company successfully tested first-stage engine named RD-181, a modified version of the RD-191 for Antares.

On 10 August 2016, the company successfully tested first-stage engine named PDU-99 "ПДУ-99" for RS-28 Sarmat.

== List of orbital launchers ==
No.	Vehicle	Origin	Engine
1.	Angara (rocket family)	Russia	RD-191
2.	Energia	Russia	RD-170
3.	Voskhod	Russia	RD-107
4.	Vostok (rocket family)	Russia	RD-107
5.	Molniya	Russia	RD-107ММ
6.	Polyot	Russia	RD-107
7.	Kosmos (rocket family)	Russia	RD-170
8.	Soyuz (rocket family)	Russia	RD-107
9.	Zenit (rocket family)	Russia & Ukraine	RD-171
10.	Dnepr	Russia & Ukraine	RD-263
11.	MAKS (spacecraft)	Russia & Ukraine	RD-701
12.	Tsyklon	Ukraine	RD-252
13.	Antares (rocket)	United States	RD-181
14.	Atlas III	United States	RD-180
15.	Atlas V	United States	RD-180
16.	Naro-1	South Korea	RD-151

== See also ==
- United Rocket and Space Corporation
