= R-36 (missile) =

Type of intercontinental ballistic missile designed by the Soviet Union

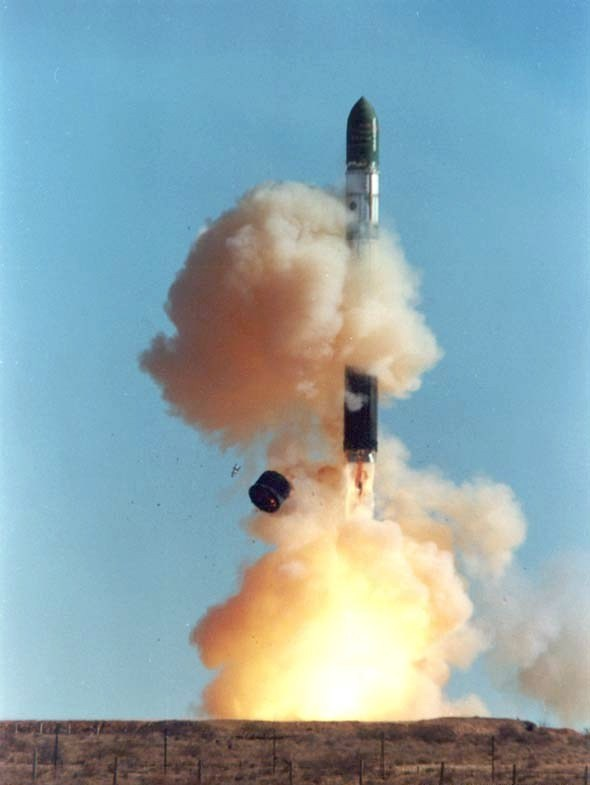
- Liftoff of a Dnepr rocket, a launch vehicle derived from the R-36 ICBM
- Type: Intercontinental ballistic missile
- Place of origin: Soviet Union

Service history
- In service: 1966–1979 (original variant); 1988–present (R-36M2 Voevoda variant)
- Used by: Russian Strategic Rocket Forces

Production history
- Designed: From 1962
- Manufacturer: Factory: Yuzhny Machine-Building Plant; Developer: Yuzhnoye Design Office
- Unit cost: $7,000,000

Specifications
- Mass: 209,600 kg (462,100 lb)
- Length: 18,900 mm (740 in) - (R-36-O); 32,200 mm (1,270 in)
- Diameter: 3,050 mm (120 in)
- Warhead: Depending on variant (see variants). Newest (R-36M2), 10 × 550–750 kiloton MIRV warheads with a large amount of decoys and other penetration aids. Originally (R-36), 1 × 8–20 megaton warhead.
- Engine: Two or three (R-36MUTTKH and R-36M2) liquid fueled rocket stages First Stage: 1x RD-251 (R-36); 1x RD-251P (R-36P); 1x RD-251M (R-36-O); 1x RD-264 (R-36M); 1x RD-264 (R-36MUTTKh and R-36M2); Second Stage: 1x RD-252 (R-36); 1x RD-252 (R-36P); 1x RD-0228 (R-36M); 1x RD-0255 (R-36MUTTKh); 1x RD-0255 (R-36M2); Third Stage: 1x RD-864 (R-36MUTTKh); 1x RD-869 (R-36M2)
- Propellant: N_{2}O_{4}/UDMH
- Operational range: 10,200–16,000 km
- Guidance system: Inertial, autonomous
- Accuracy: 220–1,300 m CEP
- Launch platform: Silo

The R-36 (Russian: Р-36) is a family of silo-launched intercontinental ballistic missiles (ICBMs) and space launch vehicles (Tsyklon and Dnepr) designed by the Soviet Union during the Cold War. The original R-36 was deployed under the GRAU index 8K67 and was given the NATO reporting name SS-9 Scarp. It was able to carry three warheads and was the first Soviet MIRV (multiple independently targetable re-entry vehicle) missile. The later version, the R-36M, also known as RS20, was produced under the GRAU designations 15A14 and 15A18 and was given the NATO reporting name SS-18 Satan. Some R-36 missiles have been converted into Tsyklon family launch vehicles, and some R-36MUTTKh missiles have been converted into Dnepr medium-lift launch vehicles, capable of putting up to 4,500 kg into orbit. However, neither launch vehicles remain active, with the Tsyklon-4 being cancelled in 2023.

== History ==
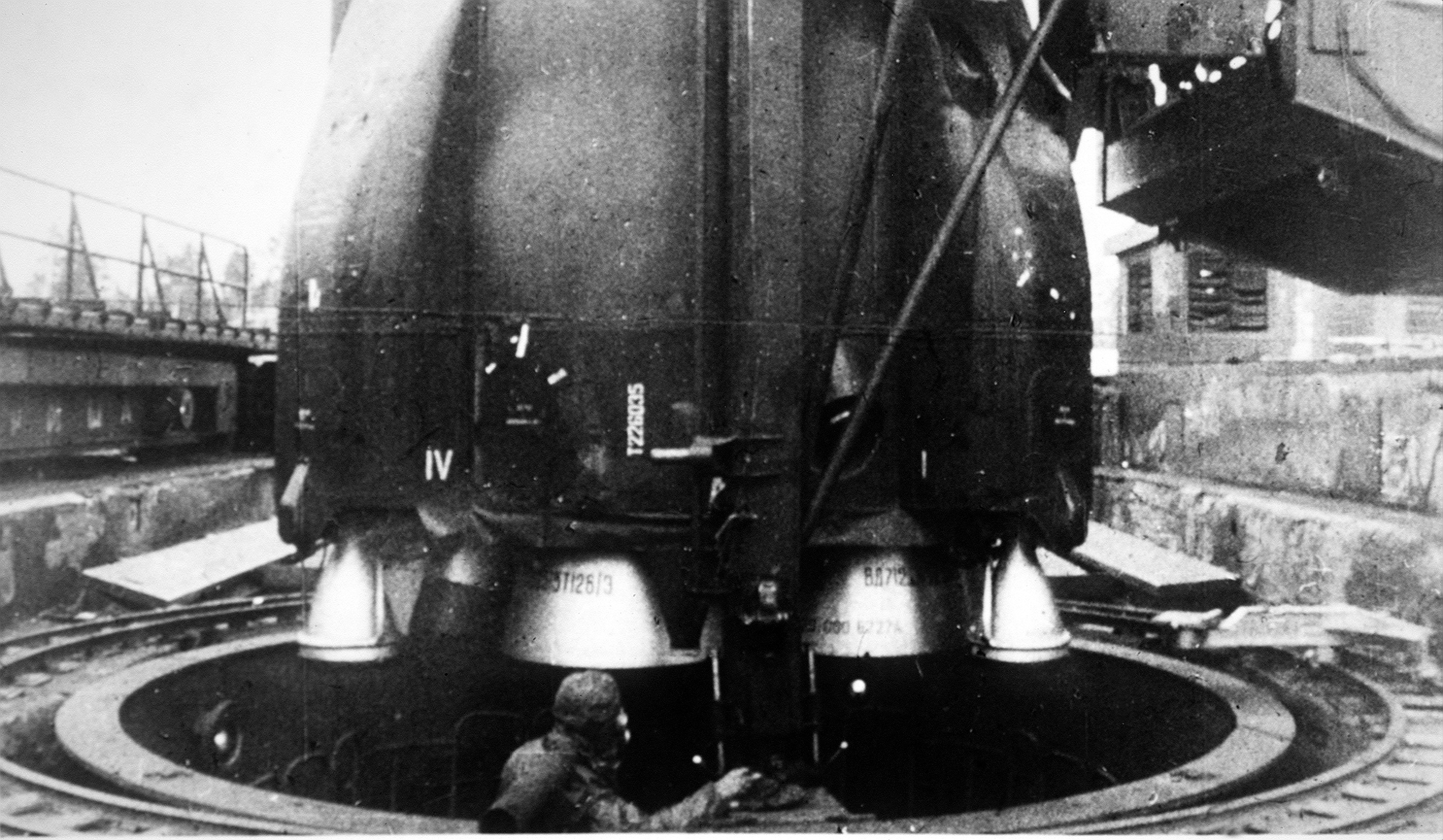
Rocket nozzles of an R-36

Development of the R-36 was begun by OKB-586 (Yuzhnoye) in Dnepropetrovsk, Ukraine (at the time part of the Soviet Union) in 1962, and built upon the work of the R-16 program. The Chief Designer was Mikhail Yangel.

In 1970, development of a fourth version, capable of delivering multiple warheads, was begun, which was test flown the next year.

However, neither the Soviet Union nor the Russian Federation have ever publicly delineated the missile's particular role in their arsenal. The initial design of the R-36M called for a single massive 12 Mt warhead to be delivered over a range of 10,600 km. The missile was first tested in 1973 but this test ended in failure. After several delays the R-36M was deployed in December 1975. This design was delivered with a single 18–20 Mt warhead and a range of just over 11,000 km. This new version was given a new codename by NATO: SS-18 Satan.

The R-36M has gone through six separate variants, with the first being phased out by 1984. The final variant designated R-36M-2 "Voevoda" (NATO codename SS-18 mod 6) was deployed in August 1988. This missile could deliver the same 18–20 Mt warhead 16,000 km. Prior variants mainly introduced MIRV (Multiple independent reentry vehicles) warheads.

The control system for this rocket was designed at NPO "Electropribor" (Kharkiv, Ukraine).

=== Deployment ===
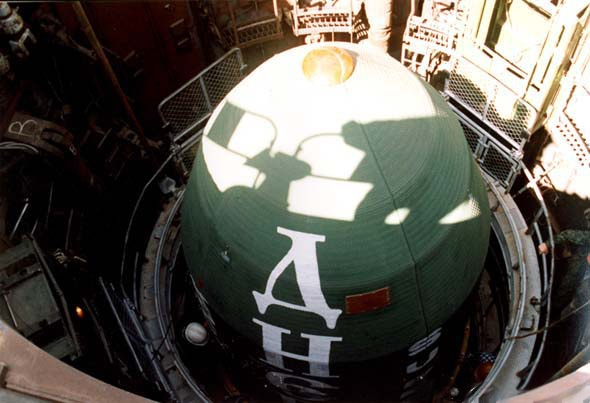
Dnepr inside silo

At full deployment, before the fall of the Soviet Union in 1991, 308 R-36M launch silos were operational. After the breakup of the USSR, 204 of these were located on the territory of the Russian Federation and 104 on the territory of newly independent Kazakhstan. In the next few years Russia reduced the number of R-36M launch silos to 154 to conform with the START I treaty. Part of the missiles in Kazakhstan (54 of them) were under the 57th Rocket Division at Zhangiz-Tobe (Solnechnyy), Semipalatinsk Oblast. The other R-36 establishment in Kazakhstan was the 38th Rocket Division at Derzhavinsk, Turgay Oblast. The dismantling of 104 launchers located in Kazakhstan was completed in September 1996.

The START II treaty was to eliminate all R-36M missiles but it did not enter into force and the missiles remained on duty. Russia has steadily decreased the number of operational R-36Ms and as of March 2013, only 55 (all of the 10 MIRV R-36M2 version) remained.

US Air Force National Air and Space Intelligence Center estimates that as of June 2017 about 50 R-36M2 launchers were operationally deployed.

About 40 missiles will have their service lives extended so that they remain in service until about 2020. With the retirement of the 20 megaton R-36M2 warheads, the highest yield weapon in service with any nation is the estimated 5 Mt Chinese Dong Feng 5 (DF-5) ICBM (CSS-4) warhead and the Russian UR-100N 5 Mt rocket.

=== Elimination / Retirement ===
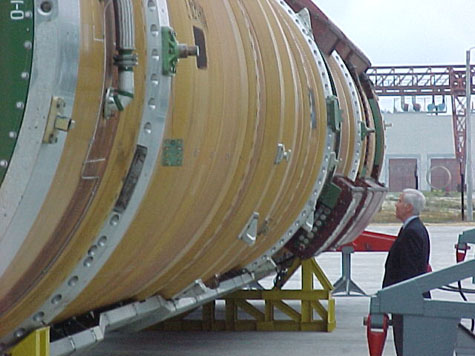
Senator Richard Lugar inspects an R-36M ICBM being readied for decommission under the Nunn-Lugar Program

Russian armed forces have been steadily reducing the number of R-36M missiles in service, withdrawing those that age past their designed operational lifetime. As of January 2020, the Strategic Missile Troops had 46 R-36M2s (or RS-20Vs) in active service.

According to Interfax report, two R-36M2 missiles were dismantled. The process is to be carried out in accordance with the New START procedures.

As of 2018 Russia unveiled the intended replacement for the R-36M series, a new heavy ICBM the RS-28 Sarmat, which became operational in September 2023. As of mid 2026 doubts still exist about its readiness.

== Design ==
=== Multiple warheads ===
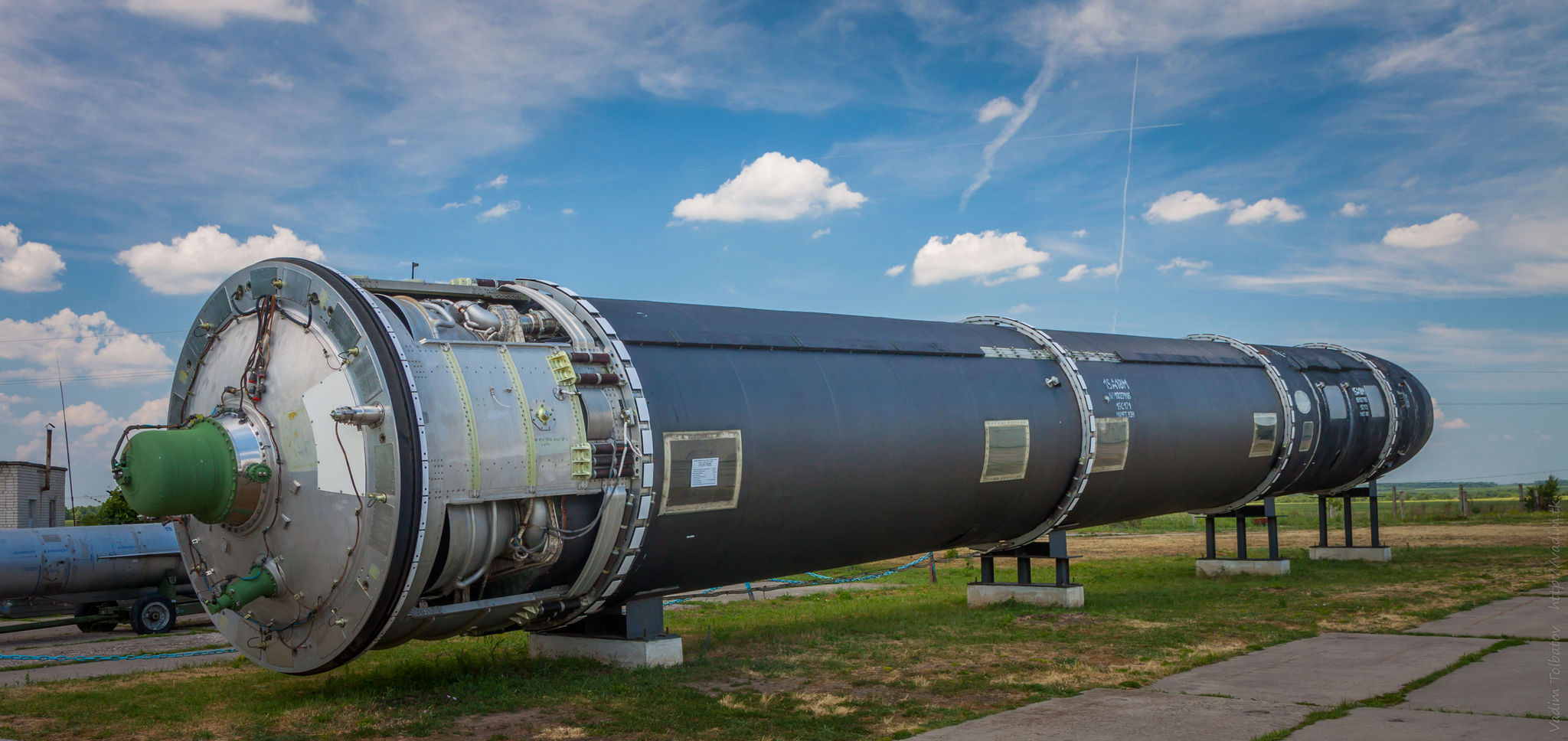
Decommissioned R36M missile at the Strategic Missile Forces Museum

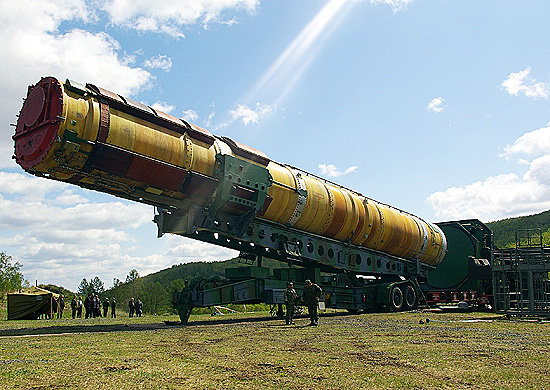
R36M missile

Among the projects that the Soviet Union considered in the mid-1970s was that of a 15A17 missile—a follow-on to the R-36MUTTKh (15A18). The missile would have had an even greater throw-weight—9.5 tonnes—and would be able to carry a very large number of warheads. Five different versions of the missile were considered. Three of these versions would carry regular warheads — 38 × 250 kt yield, 24 × 500 kt yield, or 15–17 × 1 Mt yield. Two modifications were supposed to carry guided warheads ("upravlyaemaya golovnaya chast") — 28 × 250 kt or 19 × 500 kt. However, none of these upgraded models were ever developed. The SALT II Treaty, signed in 1979, prohibited increasing the number of warheads ICBMs could carry.

The operational deployment of the R-36M consisted of the R-36MUTTKh, which carried ten 500 kt warheads, and its follow-on, the R-36M2 (15A18M), which carried ten 800 kt warheads (single-warhead versions with either 8.3 Mt or 20 Mt warhead also existed at some point). To partially circumvent the treaty, the missile was equipped with 40 decoys to utilize the capacity left unused due to the 10-warhead limitation.

=== Silo hardness ===
A US military estimate circa 1994 said "SS-18 silos have since been assessed to be much harder than 7,000 psi (48 MPa)".

== Variants ==
=== R-36 (SS-9) ===
==== R-36 ====
The R-36 is a two-stage rocket powered by a liquid bipropellant, with UDMH as fuel and nitrogen tetroxide as an oxidizer. It carries one of two types of re-entry vehicles (RVs):

- Single nuclear warhead of 20 megatons TNT (NATO codename SS-9 Mod 1).
- Single nuclear warhead of 8.3 megatons TNT (NATO codename SS-9 Mod 2).

The first launch of an R-36 took place on September 28, 1963, and ended ignominiously when the missile lost thrust one second after liftoff and fell back onto the pad, causing a fire. LC-67/1 was repaired and the next test took place successfully on December 3. Subsequent testing went better, however, LC-80/1 had to be rebuilt following another launch accident on January 13, 1965. Two months later, an R-36 caught fire during propellant loading on LC-67/1 and exploded, putting the pad out of commission for nine months. During test launch #17 (October 10, 1964), the warhead was retrieved with a parachute. Flight tests of the rocket were completed by May 20, 1968, and on November 19 of the same year it entered service.

The Tsyklon series of civilian space launchers from Ukraine is based on the R-36orb (8К69) or R-36-O (capital O for Orbital) design.

==== R-36MUTTKh (SS-18 Mod 3) ====
On 29 November 1979, deployment of the improved R-36M with a single reentry vehicle carrying an 18–25 Mt warhead began. This variant is no longer in service.

==== R-36M2 Voevoda (SS-18 Mod 5) ====
The first regiment with these missiles was put on alert on 30 July 1988 and was deployed on 11 August 1988. This is the only variant still operational.

=== Derivatives ===
A proposal has been advanced to modify Voyevoda R-36M2 Satan heavy ICBMs to destroy incoming asteroids of up to 100 m, similar to the Chelyabinsk asteroid.

Deployed variants of the R-36M missile
System:	R-36M	R-36M	R-36MUTTKh	R-36MUTTKh	R-36M2	R-36M2
Treaty-designation:	RS-20A	RS-20A1	RS-20A2	RS-20B	RS-20B	RS-20V
GRAU-designation:	15A14	15A14	15A14	15A18	15A18	15A18M
NATO-designation:	SS-18 Satan Mod 1	SS-18 Satan Mod 2	SS-18 Satan Mod 3	SS-18 Satan Mod 4	SS-18 Satan Mod 5	SS-18 Satan Mod 6
Deployment:	1974–1983	1976–1980	1976–1986	1979–2005	1988–Present	1991–2009
Maximum deployed number:	148	10	30	278	104	58
Length:	32600 mm	32600 mm	32600 mm	36300 mm	36300 mm	34300 mm
Diameter:	3000 mm	3000 mm	3000 mm	3000 mm	3000 mm	3000 mm
Launch weight:	209,600 kg	209,600 kg	210,000 kg	211,100 kg	211,100 kg	211,100 kg
Number of warheads:	1	8	1	10	10	1
Warhead yield:	20 Mt	0.5-1.3 Mt	25 Mt	0.55 Mt	1 Mt	20 Mt
Range:	11,200 km	10,200 km	16,000 km	16,000 km	11,000 km	16,000 km
CEP:	1000 m	1000 m	1000 m	920 m	500 m	500 m

== Operators ==
Russia

The Strategic Missile Troops are the only operator of the R-36. As of January 2020, 46 silo-based missiles are deployed at:

- 13th Red Banner Rocket Division at Yasny, Orenburg Oblast
- 62nd Rocket Division at Uzhur, Krasnoyarsk Krai

=== Former operators ===
Soviet Union

== See also ==
- Agni-V – (India)
- DF-5 – (China)
- DF-41 – (China)
- Hwasong-14 – (North Korea)
- LGM-25C Titan II – (United States)
- LGM-30 Minuteman – (United States)
- RS-24 Yars – (Russia)
- RS-26 Rubezh – (Russia)
- RS-28 Sarmat – (Russia)
- RT-2PM Topol – (Soviet Union)
- RT-2PM2 Topol-M – (Russia)
- UR-100N – (Soviet Union)
