= Long March 6 =

Launch vehicle

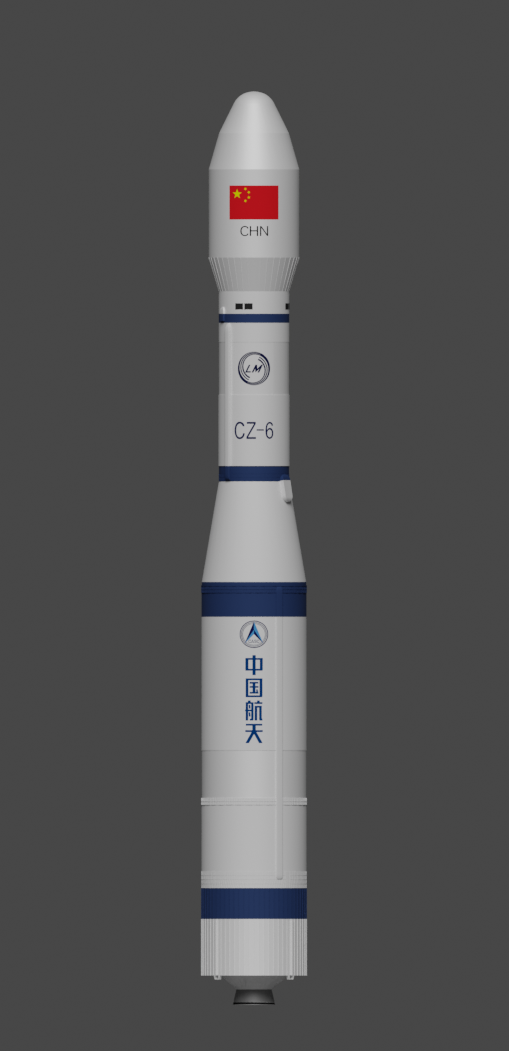
- Rendering of the Long March 6 launch vehicle
- Function: Small-lift launch vehicle
- Manufacturer: Shanghai Academy of Spaceflight Technology
- Country of origin: China

Size
- Height: 29 m (95 ft)
- Diameter: 3.35 m (11.0 ft)
- Mass: 103,000 kg (227,000 lb)
- Stages: 3

Capacity

Payload to SSO
- Altitude: 700 km (430 mi)
- Mass: 1,080 kg (2,380 lb)

Associated rockets
- Family: Long March
- Comparable: Minotaur-C

Launch history
- Status: Active
- Launch sites: Taiyuan, LA-16
- Total launches: 15
- Success(es): 15
- First flight: 19 September 2015
- Last flight: 25 April 2026 (most recent)

First stage
- Diameter: 3.35 m (11.0 ft)
- Propellant mass: 61,000 kg (134,000 lb) to 76,000 kg (168,000 lb)
- Powered by: 1 YF-100
- Maximum thrust: 1,188 kN (267,000 lb_{f})
- Specific impulse: 300 seconds (sea level); 335 seconds (vacuum)
- Propellant: RP-1/LOX

Second stage
- Diameter: 2.25 m (7 ft 5 in)
- Propellant mass: 15,000 kg (33,000 lb)
- Powered by: 1 YF-115
- Maximum thrust: 180 kN (40,000 lb_{f})
- Specific impulse: 341.5 seconds (vacuum)
- Propellant: RP-1/LOX

Third stage
- Diameter: 2.25 m (7 ft 5 in)
- Powered by: 1
- Maximum thrust: 6.5 kN (1,500 lb_{f})
- Specific impulse: 306.9 seconds
- Propellant: N_{2}O_{4} / UDMH

The Long March 6 (Chinese: 长征六号运载火箭) or Chang Zheng 6 as in pinyin, abbreviated LM 6 for export or CZ 6 within China, is a Chinese liquid-fuelled launch vehicle of the Long March family, which was developed by the China Aerospace Science and Technology Corporation (CASC) and the Shanghai Academy of Spaceflight Technology (SAST). The rocket was developed in the 2000s, and made its maiden flight in 2015. As one of the new generation rocket family, the Long March 6 was designed to be a light capacity, "high-speed response" rocket, complementing the heavy lift Long March 5 and the mid-heavy lift Long March 7 rocket families. It is capable of placing at least 1,000 kg (2,200 lb) of payload into a Sun-synchronous orbit. The first stage of the Long March 6 was derived from the booster rockets being developed for the Long March 5 rocket. It is powered by a YF-100 engine, which generates 1,340 kN (300,000 lb_{f}) of thrust from burning kerosene and LOX as rocket fuel and oxidiser. This was the first flight of the new engine design.

== Variants ==
=== LM 6A ===
An enlarged variant, the Long March 6A, which has four strap-on solid boosters, an elongated stage one, a new stage two with the same diameter as the first stage, and a payload capacity of at least 4000 kg to Sun-synchronous orbit, made its maiden flight on 29 March 2022.

=== LM 6C ===
A further iteration named the Long March 6C with a slightly shorter length than the 6A and without the four strap-on solid boosters had its successful maiden launch on 7 May 2024.

== Launch statistics ==
Long March 6 only; not including 6A or 6C variants.

- Failure
- Partial failure
- Success
- Planned

== List of launches ==
Maiden flight of Long March 6 rocket

Long March 6 only; not including 6A or 6C variants.

Flight number	Serial number	Date (UTC)	Launch site	Payload	Orbit	Result
1	Y1	19 September 2015; 23:01	Taiyuan, LA-16	ZDPS-2A, ZDPS-2B; NS-2; ZJ-1, ZJ-2; Tiantuo 3 NUDT-Phone-Sat; Xingchen 1/2/3/4; LilacSat 2 XY-2; DCBB; Xiwang-2A/2B/2C/2E/2F	SSO	Success
2	Y2	21 November 2017; 04:50	Taiyuan, LA-16	Jilin 1-04/05/06	SSO	Success
3	Y4	13 November 2019; 06:35	Taiyuan, LA-16	Ningxia-1 01; Ningxia-1 02; Ningxia-1 03; Ningxia-1 04; Ningxia-1 05	LEO	Success
4	Y3	6 November 2020; 03:19	Taiyuan, LA-16	ÑuSat 9-18 (10 satellites)	SSO	Success
5	Y5	27 April 2021; 03:20	Taiyuan, LA-16	Qilu-1; Qilu-4; Foshan-1; Zhongan Guotong-1; Tianqi-9; Origin Space NEO-1; Tai King II 01; Golden Bauhinia-1 01; Golden Bauhinia-1 02	SSO	Success
6	Y6	9 July 2021; 11:59	Taiyuan, LA-16	Zhuzhou-1 01; Zhuzhou-1 02; Zhuzhou-1 03; Zhuzhou-1 04; Zhuzhou-1 05	LEO	Success
7	Y7	4 August 2021; 11:01	Taiyuan, LA-16	KL-Beta A KL-Beta B	Polar	Success
8	Y8	5 November 2021; 02:19	Taiyuan, LA-16	Guangmu-1 (CASEarth)	SSO	Success
9	Y10	10 August 2022; 04:50	Taiyuan, LA-16	Jilin-1 GF-03D09, 35-43; Yunyao-1 04–08; Tianjin Binghai-1	SSO	Success
10	Y9	26 September 2022; 23:50	Taiyuan, LA-16	Shiyan 16A; Shiyan 16B; Shiyan 17	SSO	Success
11	Y12	20 June 2023; 03:18	Taiyuan, LA-16	Shiyan 25	SSO	Success
12	Y11	5 September 2024; 18:30	Taiyuan, LA-16	Geely Constellation Group 03 (10 sats)	LEO	Success
13	Y13	22 October 2024; 00:10	Taiyuan, LA-16	Tianping-3 A01; Tianping-3 B01; Tianping-3 B02	SSO	Success
14	Y14	3 April 2025; 02:12	Taiyuan, LA-16	Tianping-3 A02	LEO	Success
15	Y15	25 April 2026; 12:15	Taiyuan, LA-16	PRSC-EO3	LEO	Success

Lists of launches for the related Long March 6A and Long March 6C can be found in their respective Wikipedia pages.

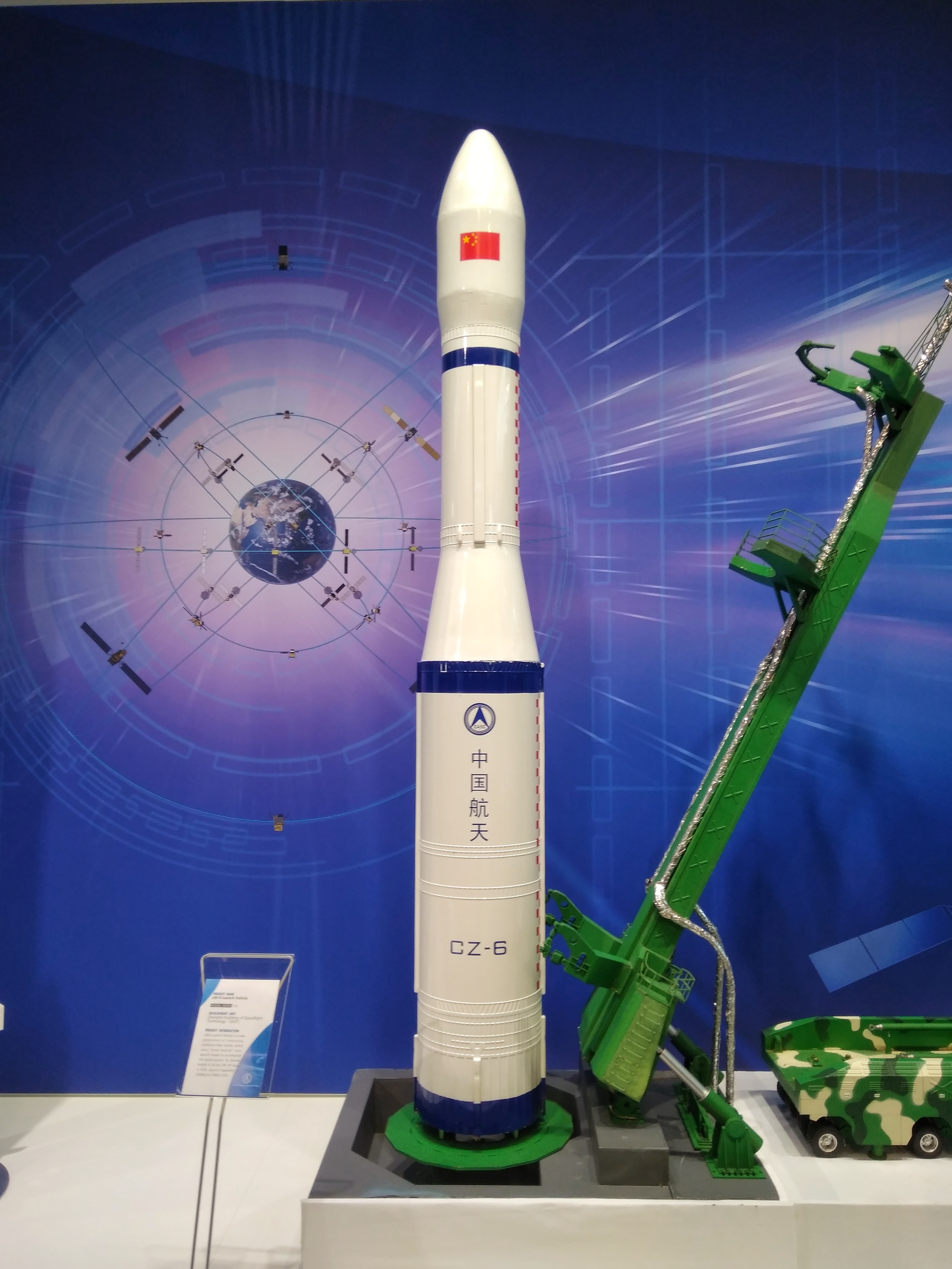
Long March 6 model with launch pad umbilical arm

== See also ==
- List of Long March launches (2025-2029)
- Comparison of orbital launchers families
- Comparison of orbital launch systems
