= YF-115 =

Chinese rocket engine

- Country of origin: China
- First flight: Long March 6 inaugural flight (2015-09-20)
- Designer: Academy of Aerospace Liquid Propulsion Technology
- Associated LV: Long March 6, Long March 7 and Long March 12
- Status: In service

Liquid-fuel engine
- Propellant: LOX / RP-1
- Mixture ratio: 2.5
- Cycle: Oxidizer-rich Staged combustion

Configuration
- Chamber: 1

Performance
- Thrust, vacuum: 176.5 kN (39,700 lbf)
- Thrust, sea-level: 147.1 kN (33,100 lbf)
- Chamber pressure: 12 MPa (1,700 psi)
- Specific impulse, vacuum: 341.5 seconds (3.349 km/s)

Dimensions
- Length: 2,325 millimetres (91.5 in)
- Diameter: 946 millimetres (37.2 in)

Used in
- second stages of Long March 6, Long March 7 and Long March 12

The YF-115 is a Chinese liquid rocket engine burning LOX and kerosene in an oxidizer-rich staged combustion cycle. A high efficiency/high thrust environmental-friendly rocket engine was always an objective within Programme 863. Development began in the 2000s, along with its sibling, the bigger YF-100, which would power the LM-5, LM-6 and LM-7 boosters and first stages. Testing was directed by the China National Space Administration (CNSA) commencing in 2005. Development works are mainly carried out by the Xi'an Aerospace Propulsion Institute. It is used as the upper stage engine for China's next generation of medium and light environmental-friendly launch vehicles, namely the Long March 6 and the Long March 7. During early 2012, the engine system successfully passed vacuum testing. It is China's first upper stage rocket engine to adopt the staged-combustion cycle.

In the LM-6 upper stage it will use a single YF-115 with gimbaled mount. While the LM-7 upper stage will use four such engines. But in this latter case, two engines will be fixed and two will be gimbaled.

The newest rocket in the Long March series, the Long March 12, uses two YF-115 engines in its second stage.

== See also ==
- LM-6 – Rocket family that uses the YF-115.
- LM-7 – Rocket family that uses the YF-115.
- LM-12 – Rocket family that uses the YF-115.
- YF-100 – First stage Chinese rocket engine which is the technological base of the YF-115.
