= MAKS (spacecraft) =

Proposed Soviet air-launched reusable launch system project

- Rendering of a MAKS spaceplane carried atop an Antonov An-225 to stratosphere for launching into space
- Country of origin: Soviet Union
- Operator: Soviet space program
- Applications: Transport to low Earth orbit and back

Specifications
- Regime: Low Earth orbit
- Design life: 1981 to 1991

Production
- Status: Canceled, 1991
- Launched: None

The MAKS (Multipurpose aerospace system) (Russian: МАКС (Многоцелевая авиационно-космическая система)) is a Soviet air-launched orbiter reusable launch system project that was proposed in 1988, but cancelled in 1991. The MAKS orbiter was supposed to reduce the cost of transporting materials to Earth orbit by a factor of ten. The reusable orbiter and its external expendable fuel tank would have been launched by an Antonov An-225 jet aircraft. Had it been built, the system would have weighed 275 metric tons (271 long tons; 303 short tons) and been capable of carrying a 7-metric-ton (6.9-long-ton; 7.7-short-ton) payload.

Three variants of the MAKS system were conceived: MAKS-OS, the standard configuration with the orbiter on top of the fuel tank; MAKS-T, with upgraded payload capability and a configuration that involved the fuel tank above the orbiter; and MAKS-M, a version that included its fuel tank within the envelope of the orbiter.

As of June 2010, Russia was considering reviving the MAKS program. In Ukraine, this project has developed into other air-launched orbiter projects, such as Svityaz and Oril.

== See also ==
- Air launch to orbit
- Buran programme
- Kliper
- State Space Agency of Ukraine § Svityaz project
- RD-701 – main engine
