= Zenit (rocket family) =

Soviet (now Ukrainian) rocket

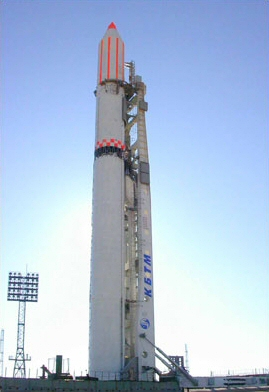
- Zenit-2 rocket (Baikonur, 10 December 2001)
- Function: Medium-lift expendable carrier rocket
- Manufacturer: Yuzhnoye (design); Yuzhmash (manufacturing)
- Country of origin: Zenit-2: USSR, Ukraine; Zenit-3SL: Ukraine

Size
- Height: 57–59.6 m (187–196 ft)
- Diameter: 3.9 m (13 ft)
- Mass: 444,900–462,200 kg (980,800–1,019,000 lb)
- Stages: 2 or 3

Capacity

Payload to LEO
- Mass: Zenit-2: 13,740 kg (30,290 lb)

Payload to SSO
- Mass: Zenit-2: 11,380 kg (25,090 lb)

Payload to GTO
- Mass: Zenit-3SL: 6,000 kg (13,000 lb)

Launch history
- Status: Suspended
- Launch sites: Baikonur LC-45; Odyssey (ocean platform)
- Total launches: 84; 36 Zenit 2; 36 Zenit 3SL; 2 Zenit 2M; 6 Zenit 3SLB; 4 Zenit 3F
- Success(es): 71; 28 Zenit 2; 32 Zenit 3SL; 2 Zenit 2M; 5 Zenit 3SLB; 4 Zenit 3F
- Failures: 10; 7 Zenit 2; 3 Zenit 3SL
- Partial failures: 3; 1 Zenit 2; 1 Zenit 3SL; 1 Zenit 3SLB
- First flight: Zenit 2: 13 April 1985; Zenit 3SL: 28 March 1999; Zenit 2M: 29 June 2007; Zenit 3SLB: 28 April 2008; Zenit 3F: 20 January 2011
- Last flight: Zenit 2: 10 June 2004; Zenit 3SL: 26 May 2014; Zenit 2M: 8 November 2011; Zenit 3SLB: 31 August 2013; Zenit 3F: 26 December 2017

First stage
- Powered by: 1 RD-171
- Maximum thrust: 8,180 kilonewtons (1,840,000 lb_{f})
- Specific impulse: 337 seconds (3.30 km/s)
- Burn time: 150 seconds
- Propellant: RG-1 / LOX

Second stage
- Powered by: 1 RD-120; 1 RD-8
- Maximum thrust: 912 kilonewtons (205,000 lb_{f}); 79,500 newtons (17,900 lb_{f})
- Specific impulse: 349 seconds (3.42 km/s)
- Burn time: 315 seconds
- Propellant: RG-1/LOX

Third stage (Zenit-3SL/3SLB) – Block DM-SL
- Powered by: 1 RD-58M
- Maximum thrust: 84,900 newtons (19,100 lb_{f})
- Specific impulse: 352 seconds (3.45 km/s)
- Burn time: 650 seconds
- Propellant: RG-1 / LOX

Third stage (Zenit-3F) – Fregat-SB
- Powered by: 1 S5.92
- Maximum thrust: 19,600 newtons (4,400 lb_{f})
- Specific impulse: 327 seconds (3.21 km/s)
- Burn time: 877 seconds
- Propellant: N_{2}O_{4} / UDMH

Zenit (Ukrainian: Зеніт, Russian: Зени́т; meaning Zenith) was a family of space launch vehicles designed by the Yuzhnoye Design Bureau in Dnipro, Ukraine, which was then part of the Soviet Union. Zenit was originally built in the 1980s for two purposes: as a liquid rocket booster for the Energia rocket and, equipped with a second stage, as a stand-alone middle-weight launcher with a payload greater than the 7 tonnes of the Soyuz but smaller than the 20 tonnes payload of the Proton. The last rocket family developed in the USSR, the Zenit was intended as an eventual replacement for the dated Soyuz and Proton families, and it would employ propellants which were safer and less toxic than the Proton's nitrogen tetroxide/UDMH mix. Zenit was planned to take over crewed spaceship launches from Soyuz, but these plans were abandoned after the dissolution of the Soviet Union in 1991.

Many of components of the Zenit rockets were produced in Russia. The Ukrainian space industry was highly integrated with that of Russia due to its Soviet heritage, but that cooperation was interrupted by the Russo-Ukrainian War beginning in 2014, which has effectively led to a hiatus in the Zenit program. The subsequent Russian invasion of Ukraine in 2022 saw damage to its manufacturing facilities due to Russian missile strikes, and what survived those strikes pivoted to producing military weapons.

Zenit-3SL was launched by the Sea Launch consortium's floating launch platform in the Pacific Ocean and Zenit-2 was launched from Baikonur Cosmodrome in Kazakhstan. RD-171M engines of the Zenit's first and second stages as well as the upper stage of the Zenit-3SL rocket were supplied by Russia. An improved Zenit-3SLB rocket was used for commercial launches from Baikonur Cosmodrome beginning in April 2008, marketed as Land Launch.

Zenit-3SL was launched 36 times with 32 successes, one partial success, and three failures. The first failure, the launch of a Hughes-built communications satellite owned by ICO Global Communications, occurred during the second commercial launch on March 12, 2000, and was blamed on a software error that failed to close a valve in the second stage of the rocket. The second failure occurred on January 30, 2007, when the rocket exploded on the Odyssey launch platform, seconds after engine ignition. The NSS-8 communication satellite on board was destroyed.

On September 24, 2011 Zenit-3SL launched successfully from the Odyssey launch platform under a renewed Sea Launch project with RSC Energia as the majority stakeholder. The rocket delivered the European communication satellite Atlantic Bird 7 to its planned orbit. On February 1, 2013, another Zenit-3SL failed while launching the Intelsat 27 satellite.

== History ==
The Zenit-2 was the first Zenit to be designed for use as an orbital carrier rocket. It consists of two stages. The first uses an RD-171 engine, and an RD-120 engine powers the second stage. It first flew on 13 April 1985, two years before the Energia, due to delays relating to the Energia's development. Zenit-2 would be certified for crewed launches and placed in specially built launch pad at Baykonur spaceport, carrying the new crewed partially reusable Zarya spacecraft that developed in end of the 1980s but was canceled. Also in the 1980s Vladimir Chelomey's firm proposed never realised 15-ton Uragan spaceplane launched by Zenit-2.

Two launch facilities were constructed for the Zenit at Baikonur, but the second was only ever used twice. On October 4, 1990, an attempted launch of a Tselina-2 naval reconnaissance satellite ended in disaster as the booster suffered a first stage engine failure seconds into launch and fell back onto the pad, which was severely damaged in the ensuing explosion. The failure was traced to a leak in a LOX line that caused a fire in the thrust section of the booster. Estimated repair costs were about 45 million rubles, but the collapse of the Soviet Union meant that there were no funds available, so the pad was abandoned.

Following two failures in 1991–92 both caused by the second stage, the Zenit was on the verge of being cancelled entirely, but a successful flight in November 1992 saved the program.

The rate of Zenit launches slowed to a trickle during the 1990s due to the severely cash-strapped Russian Federation, and also because of Russia's reluctance to fly military payloads on a booster manufactured in now-independent Ukraine. On May 20, 1997, a launch of a Tselina-2 satellite failed when the first stage shut down 48 seconds into launch. The booster crashed downrange.

During the 2000s, Zenit would find a new lease on life as the basis of the international Sea Launch project whereby commercial flights would be undertaken from an offshore launch platform. The basic Zenit booster received several upgrades to the propulsion and avionics systems for Sea Launch as well as a third stage, and the first test with a dummy payload was carried out on March 27, 1999. In October, a Direct TV 1-R satellite was orbited successfully. An ICO F-1 comsat was lost in March 2000 due to a second stage guidance malfunction. There followed eight consecutive successful launches until Apstar 5 in 2004 suffered a premature third stage shutdown that left it in an incorrect orbit, but the satellite's onboard engines corrected it.

After nine successful launches, the Zenit produced a repeat performance of the 1990 disaster when on January 30, 2007, the first stage lost thrust and exploded. The flame deflector on the Sea Launch platform broke off and sank into the water. Loose debris had been sucked into a turbopump, resulting in engine failure.

By the late 2000s, the Zenit program at Baikonour was reviving and would see considerable success.

On February 1, 2013, an Intelsat satellite launched from the Sea Launch Odyssey platform in the equatorial Pacific. The nighttime launch performed nominally for about 20 seconds when the first stage abruptly lost thrust. Approximately 40 seconds after liftoff, all telemetry data ceased. Subsequent investigation showed that the Zenit had begun deviating from its flight path when the pitch and roll maneuver started. The onboard computer sensed an abnormal situation and sent an automatic shutdown command to the first stage at T+23 seconds, and impact with the ocean occurred about one minute after liftoff. Ultimately, the failure was traced to a defective hydraulic pump that controlled gimbaling of the first stage engines. This resulted in the booster starting an uncontrolled rolling motion which caused the computer system to terminate all thrust. Although anomalous conditions began around T+11 seconds, the Zenit's flight computer was "locked" to prevent engine shutdown until at least 20 seconds after liftoff so the booster would not come down on or near the launch complex. Impact occurred about two miles downrange, but attempts to recover booster debris were unsuccessful.

In February 2015, following a year of strained relations as a result of a Russian military intervention into Ukraine, Russia announced that it would discontinue its "joint program with Ukraine to launch Dnepr rockets and [was] no longer interested in buying Ukrainian Zenit boosters, deepening problems for [Ukraine's] space program and its struggling Yuzhmash factory."

Strained relations between Ukraine and Russia after 2014 have led to Russian Federal Space Agency intending to purchase no more of the Zenit first-stage boosters made by Yuzhmash (powered by Russian engines). However 2 Zenit rockets that have been delivered to Russia for Russian Federal Space Agency missions will still be used; another Zenit rocket for launching a Ukrainian satellite has been completed but without engines due to lack of funding for payments. The world market for Zenit launch vehicles has shriveled since Sea Launch suspended operations, and the future of Zenit is uncertain.

Despite the ongoing conflict between the two governments, a Zenit rocket was launched in December 2017, after a two-year hiatus, to deliver AngoSat 1.

== Production ==
The first and the second stages of the Zenit were designed by Yuzhnoye and are manufactured by Yuzhmash.

== Variants ==
=== Zenit-2 ===
The Zenit-2 was the first member of the rocket family. It consists of two stages. The first uses an RD-171 engine, and an RD-120 engine powers the second stage. It first flew on 13 April 1985, carrying a Tselina-2 mass simulator. However the test flight was unsuccessful. The first successful flight occurred on 22 October 1985.

=== Energia booster ===
The Zenit first stage was used as a strap-on booster rocket for the Energia carrier rocket. Four Zenit first stages were attached to the core vehicle to produce extra thrust at lift-off, in the same way that Solid Rocket Boosters were used on the US Space Shuttle. Energia made two flights (1987 and 1988) before the programme was abandoned.

=== Zenit 2M and 2SLB ===
Zenit 2M is a new version of the Zenit 2 with an upgraded control system and modernized engines. The first Zenit 2M was launched on June 29, 2007, carrying a classified Russian military Tselina-2 satellite. The Zenit-2SLB designation applies to commercial launches through the Land Launch subsidiary of Sea Launch, which began satellite launches from Baikonur Cosmodrome in 2008.

=== Zenit-3SL ===
Zenit-3SL is a three-stage carrier rocket developed for and used by the Sea Launch consortium.

It combines:

- two-stage Zenit-2S built by Ukraine's SDO Yuzhnoye/PO Yuzhmash
- Block DM-SL upper stage, provided by Russia's Energia
- nose-cone enclosure for protection of payload during launch, provided by Boeing.

Rockets used by Sea Launch are assembled in Long Beach, California. Launches occur from the Ocean Odyssey offshore launch platform, situated at the equator. Ocean Odyssey is also used to transport rockets to the launch site. The most recent launch of a Zenit-3SL occurred on 11 December 2015. The RD-171 engine of the Zenit-3SL first stage, and most of the control system of -3SL missiles were made in Russia. However, according to the same source, it is not clear if Russia's component suppliers are still working together with Yuzhmash as of this date.

=== Zenit 3M and 3SLB ===
The Zenit-3M is a Zenit-2M with the Block-DM upper stage used on the Zenit-3SL. It is launched from Baikonur. The maiden flight was launched on 28 April 2008. Land Launch commercially market the Zenit-3M under the designation Zenit 3SLB.

=== Zenit-3F ===
The Zenit-3F, also known as the Zenit-2SB/Fregat, is a 3-stage derivative of the Zenit-2M, using a Fregat upper stage, as already used on the Soyuz, to propel spacecraft to higher orbits. It made its maiden flight in January 2011, with the Elektro-L No.1 spacecraft for the Russian government. Later the same year, another launch carried Spektr-R, a 5,000-kilogram (11,000 lb) space telescope, into an orbit with a perigee of 10,000 kilometres (6,200 mi) and an apogee of 390,000 kilometres (240,000 mi). The most recent launch occurred on 26 December 2017 from Baikonur Cosmodrome when the rocket lifted off with the Angolian Angosat 1 spacecraft.

== Specifications ==
=== Overview ===
	Zenit-2	Zenit-3SL
Stages	2	3
Total length	57 m	59.6 m
Total empty mass	37,600 kg	40,320 kg
Total gross mass	444,900 kg	462,200 kg
Payload	13.74 tonne to LEO	≈6 tonne to GTO
Launch site	Baikonur Cosmodrome	Sea Launch ocean platform
Launches	21 (6 failed) as of 10 June 2004	31 (3 failed, 1 partial success) as of 1 February 2013
Success ratio	71.4%	91.1%
Price per launch	~$45 million	~$90 million

=== Payload capacities ===
==== Two stage version (Zenit-2) ====
Payload to LEO	13,740 kg
Payload to PEO	5,000 kg
Payload to GEO	Not designed for GEO

==== Three stage version (Zenit-3SL) ====
Payload to LEO	6,100 kg, 3rd stage structural limitation
Payload to MEO	3,965 kg (10,000 km, 45°)
Payload to GEO	1840 kg
Payload to GTO	5,250 kg (upgraded to 6,000+ kg)

== See also ==
- Comparison of orbital launcher families
- Tsyklon-4
- State Space Agency of Ukraine
