= Atlas (rocket family) =

Family of American missiles and space launch vehicles

Atlas family
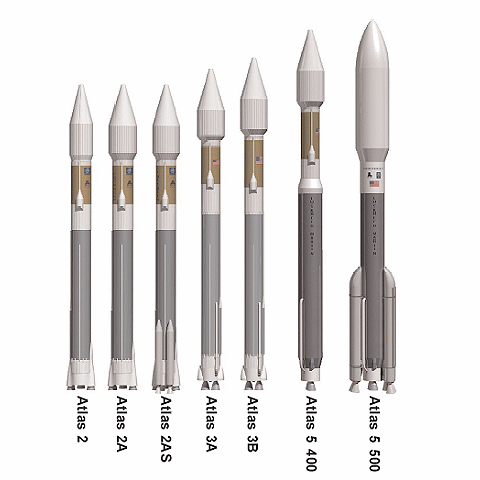
- Atlas II, III and V comparison

General information
- Type: Expendable launch system with various applications
- Manufacturer: Convair/General Dynamics; Lockheed Martin; United Launch Alliance
- Status: Atlas V (current)
- Primary users: United States Air Force National Aeronautics and Space Administration

History
- Manufactured: 1957–2020s (decade)
- Introduction date: 1957
- First flight: December 17, 1957; 68 years ago
- Variants: SM-65 Atlas; SM-65D Atlas; Atlas LV-3C; Atlas IIIA; Atlas V

Atlas is a family of US missiles and space launch vehicles derived from the SM-65 Atlas. The Atlas intercontinental ballistic missile (ICBM) program was initiated in the late 1950s by General Dynamics through its Convair division. Atlas was a liquid propellant rocket burning RP-1 kerosene fuel with liquid oxygen in three engines configured in an unusual "stage-and-a-half" or "parallel staging" design: two outboard booster engines were jettisoned along with supporting structures during ascent, while the center sustainer engine, propellant tanks and other structural elements remained connected through propellant depletion and engine shutdown.

The Atlas name was originally proposed by Karel Bossart and his design team working at Convair on project MX-1593. Using the name of a mighty Titan from Greek mythology reflected the missile's place as the biggest and most powerful at the time. It also reflected the former parent company of Convair before its General Dynamics acquisition, the Atlas Corporation.

The missiles saw only brief ICBM service, and the last squadron was taken off operational alert in 1965. However, from 1962 to 1963 Atlas boosters launched the first four US astronauts to orbit the Earth (in contrast to the preceding two Redstone suborbital launches). The Atlas-Agena and Atlas-Centaur satellite launch vehicles were also derived directly from the original Atlas. The Atlas-Centaur was evolved into the Atlas II, various models of which were launched 63 times between 1991 and 2004. There were only six launches of the succeeding Atlas III, all between 2000 and 2005. The Atlas V is still in service, with launches planned into the mid-2020s.

More than 300 Atlas launches have been conducted from Cape Canaveral Space Force Station in Florida and 285 from Vandenberg Space Force Base in California.

== Launch vehicles based on original Atlas ICBM ==
The Atlas was used as an expendable launch system, with both the Agena and Centaur upper stages, for the Mariner space probes used to explore Mercury, Venus, and Mars (1962–1973); and to launch ten of the Mercury program missions (1962–1963).

=== SM-65 Atlas missile ===
The first successful test launch of an SM-65 Atlas missile was on 17 December 1957. Approximately 350 Atlas missiles were built.

The Atlas boosters would collapse under their own weight if not kept pressurized with nitrogen gas in the tanks when devoid of propellants. The Atlas booster was unusual in its use of "balloon" tanks. The rockets were made from very thin stainless steel that offered minimal or no rigid support. It was pressure in the tanks that gave the rigidity required for space flight. In order to save weight they were not painted and needed a specially designed oil to prevent rust. This was the original use of WD-40 water displacement oil.

The SM-65 Atlas was used as a first stage for satellite launch vehicles for half a century. Many were eventually converted to orbital launch vehicles after they were removed from service as missiles. Missiles converted into Atlas E/F "space boosters" were used to launch the early "Block I" GPS satellites.

=== SM-65B Atlas SCORE launch ===
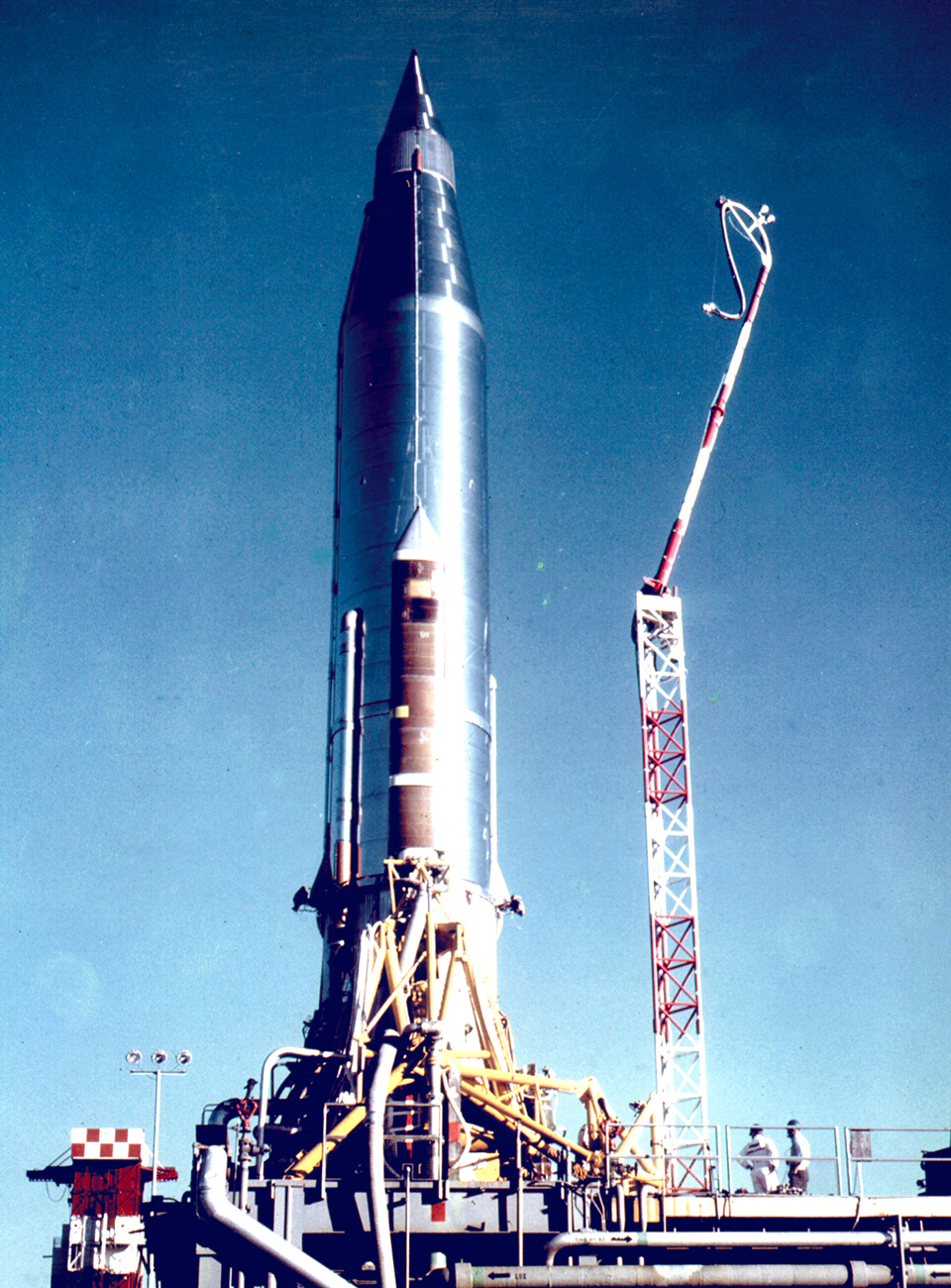
Atlas-B with SCORE payload, at LC-11, 1958

Early Atlas rockets were also built specifically for non-military uses. On 18 December 1958, an Atlas was used to launch the Signal Communication by Orbiting Relay Equipment (SCORE) satellite, which was "the first prototype of a communications satellite, and the first test of any satellite for direct practical applications." The communications payload was placed into low Earth orbit on Atlas serial number 10B without an upper stage. Atlas 10B/SCORE, at 8,750 lb (3,970 kg) was the heaviest artificial object then in orbit, the first voice relay satellite, and the first human-made object in space easily visible to the naked eye due to the large, mirror-polished stainless steel tank. This was the first flight in what would be a long career for the Atlas as a satellite launcher.

=== Atlas-D based launchers ===
Atlas D missile-derived SLV-3s were used for orbital launches with the RM-81 Agena and Centaur upper stages. The modified Atlas LV-3B was used for the orbital element of Project Mercury, launching four crewed Mercury spacecraft into low Earth orbit. Atlas D launches were conducted from Cape Canaveral Air Force Station, at Launch Complexes 11, 12, 13 and 14, and Vandenberg AFB Launch Complex 576.

Two suborbital stage and a half vehicles were used during Project FIRE as sounding rockets.

By 1979, Atlas space launcher variants had been whittled down to just the Atlas-Centaur and some refurbished ICBMs. The launch rate of Atlases decreased in the 1980s due to the advent of the Space Shuttle, but Atlas launches continued until 2004, when the last "classic" Atlas with balloon tanks and the jettisonable booster section launched a comsat for the Air Force.

==== Mercury program ====
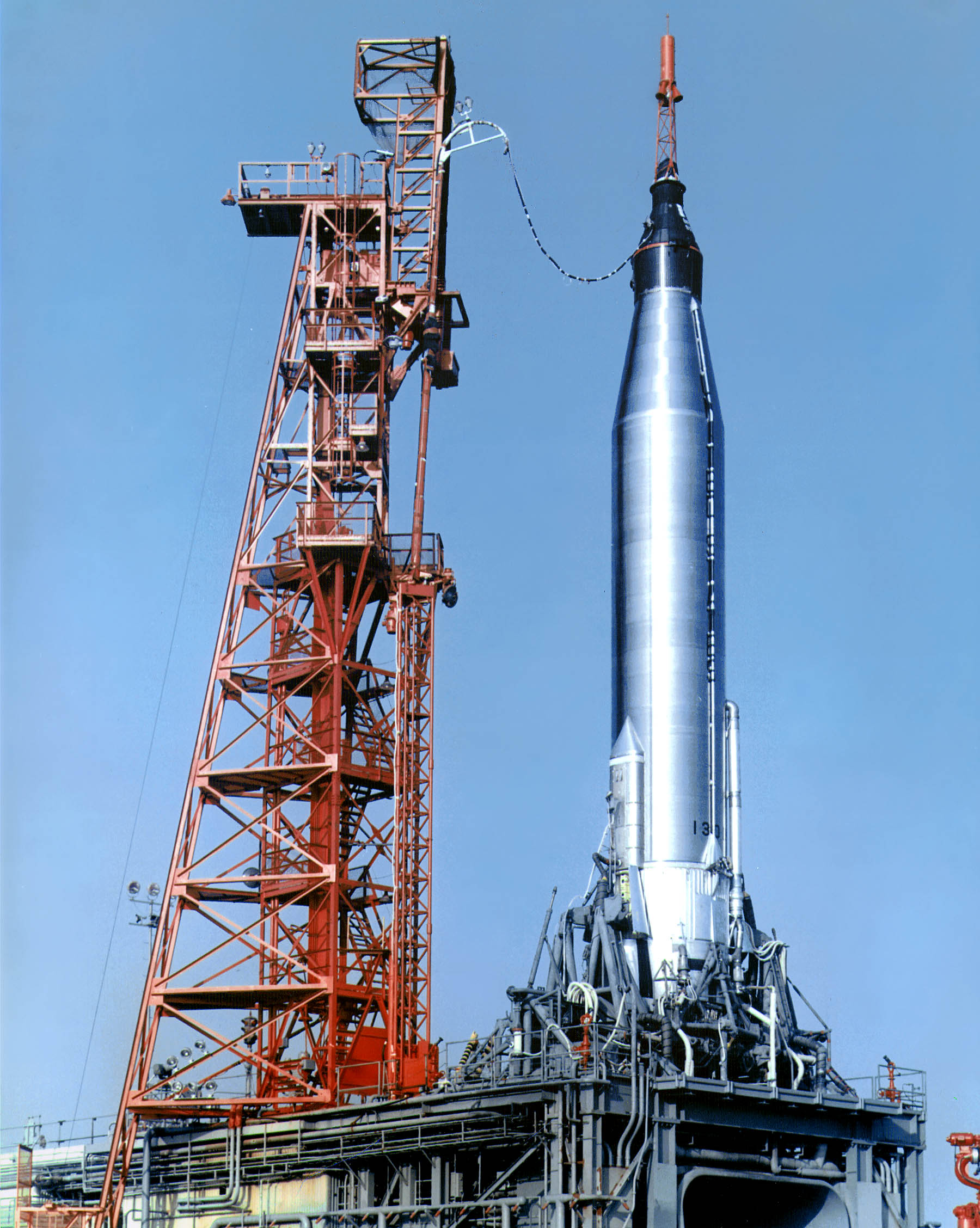
Mercury-Atlas 9 at Launch Complex 14

Atlas boosters were also used for the last four crewed Project Mercury missions, the first United States crewed space program. On February 20, 1962, it launched Friendship 7, which made three Earth orbits carrying John Glenn, the first United States astronaut to orbit the Earth. Identical Atlas boosters successfully launched three more crewed Mercury orbital missions from 1962 to 1963.

Atlas saw the beginnings of its "workhorse" status during the Mercury-Atlas missions, which resulted in Lt. Col. John H. Glenn Jr. becoming the first American to orbit the Earth in 1962. Atlas was also used throughout the mid-1960s to launch the Agena Target Vehicles used during the Gemini program.

==== Atlas-Agena ====
Beginning in 1960, the Agena upper stage, powered by hypergolic propellant, was used extensively on Atlas launch vehicles. The United States Air Force, NRO and CIA used them to launch SIGINT satellites. NASA used them in the Ranger program to obtain the first close-up images of the surface of the Moon and for Mariner 2, the first spacecraft to fly by another planet. Each of the Agena target vehicles used for the later space rendezvous practice missions of Gemini was launched on an Atlas rocket.

==== Atlas-Centaur ====
The Atlas-Centaur was an expendable launch system derived from the SM-65D Atlas missile. Launches were conducted from two pads of the Launch Complex 36 at Cape Canaveral Air Force Station, Florida. The Atlas' engines were upgraded and the structure reinforced for the large upper stage, along with elongated propellant tanks.

The first launch attempt of an Atlas-Centaur in May 1962 failed, the rocket exploding after take-off. Footage of this was shown in the penultimate shot of the 1982 art film Koyaanisqatsi, directed by Godfrey Reggio.

Beginning in 1963, the liquid hydrogen-fueled Centaur upper stage was also used on dozens of Atlas launches. NASA launched the Surveyor program lunar lander spacecraft and most of the Mars-bound Mariner program spacecraft with Atlas-Centaur launch vehicles.

=== Atlas E/F ===
Following retirement as an ICBM, the Atlas-E, along with the Atlas-F, were refurbished for orbital launches.

The last Atlas E/F spacecraft launch was conducted on 24 March 1995, using a rocket which had originally been built as an Atlas-E. The last Atlas E/F launch to use a rocket which had originally been built as an Atlas-F was conducted on 23 June 1981.

Atlas E/F was used to launch the Block I series of GPS satellites from 1978 to 1985. The last refurbished Atlas-F vehicle was launched from Vandenberg AFB in 1995 carrying a satellite for the Defense Meteorological Satellite Program.

=== Tabulated ===
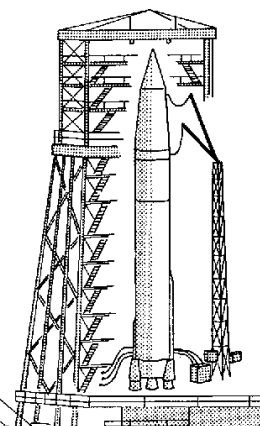
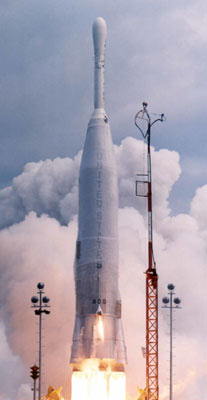
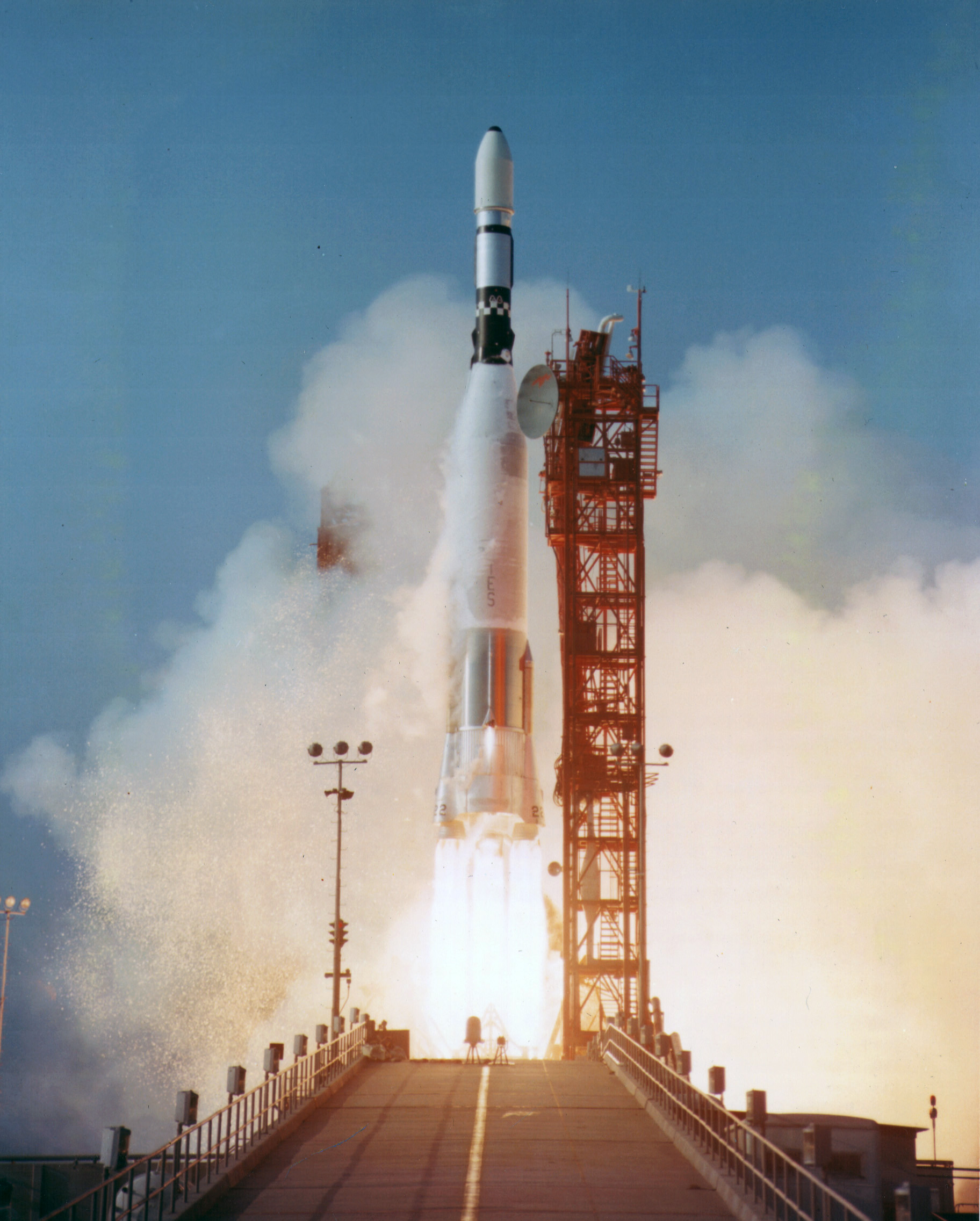
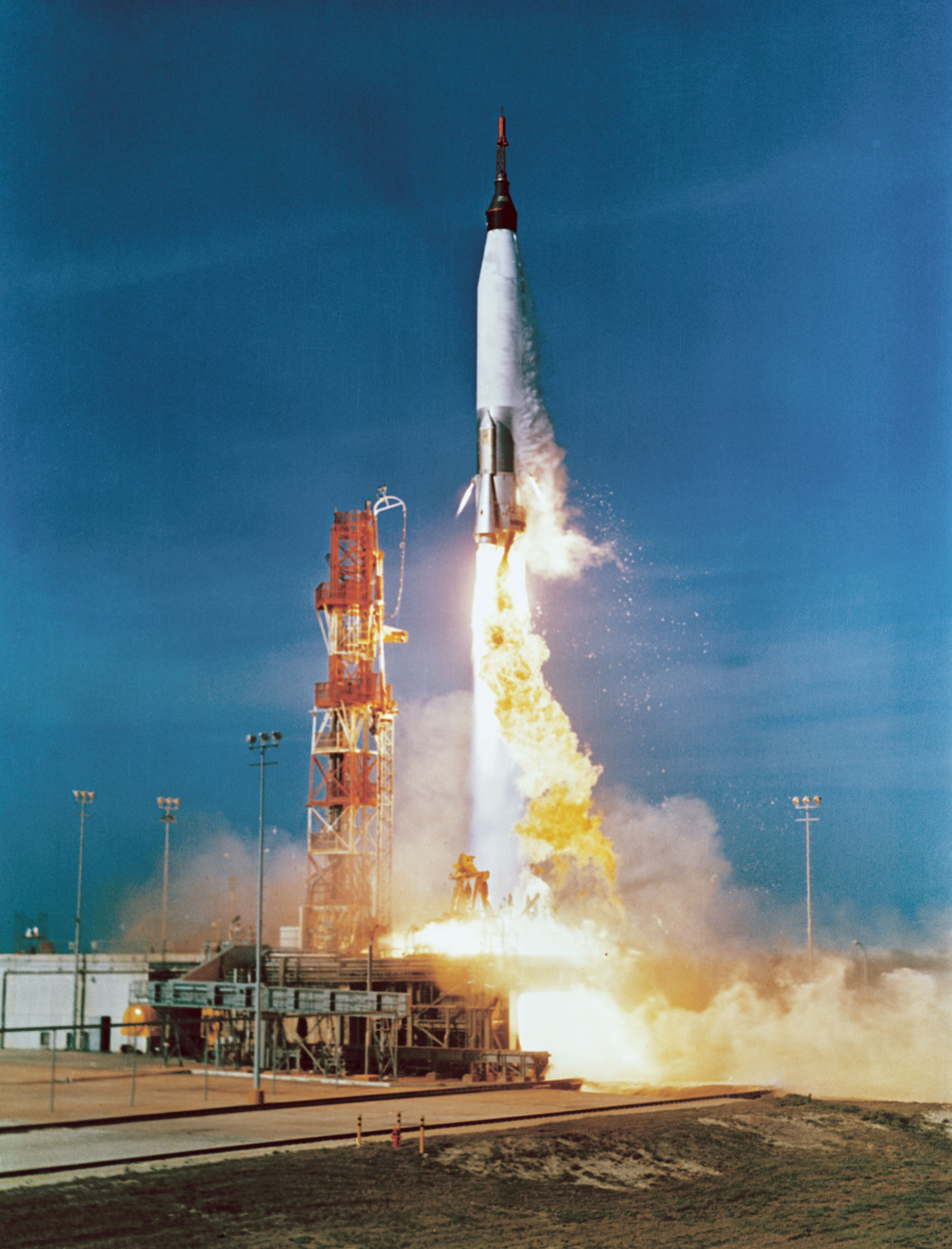
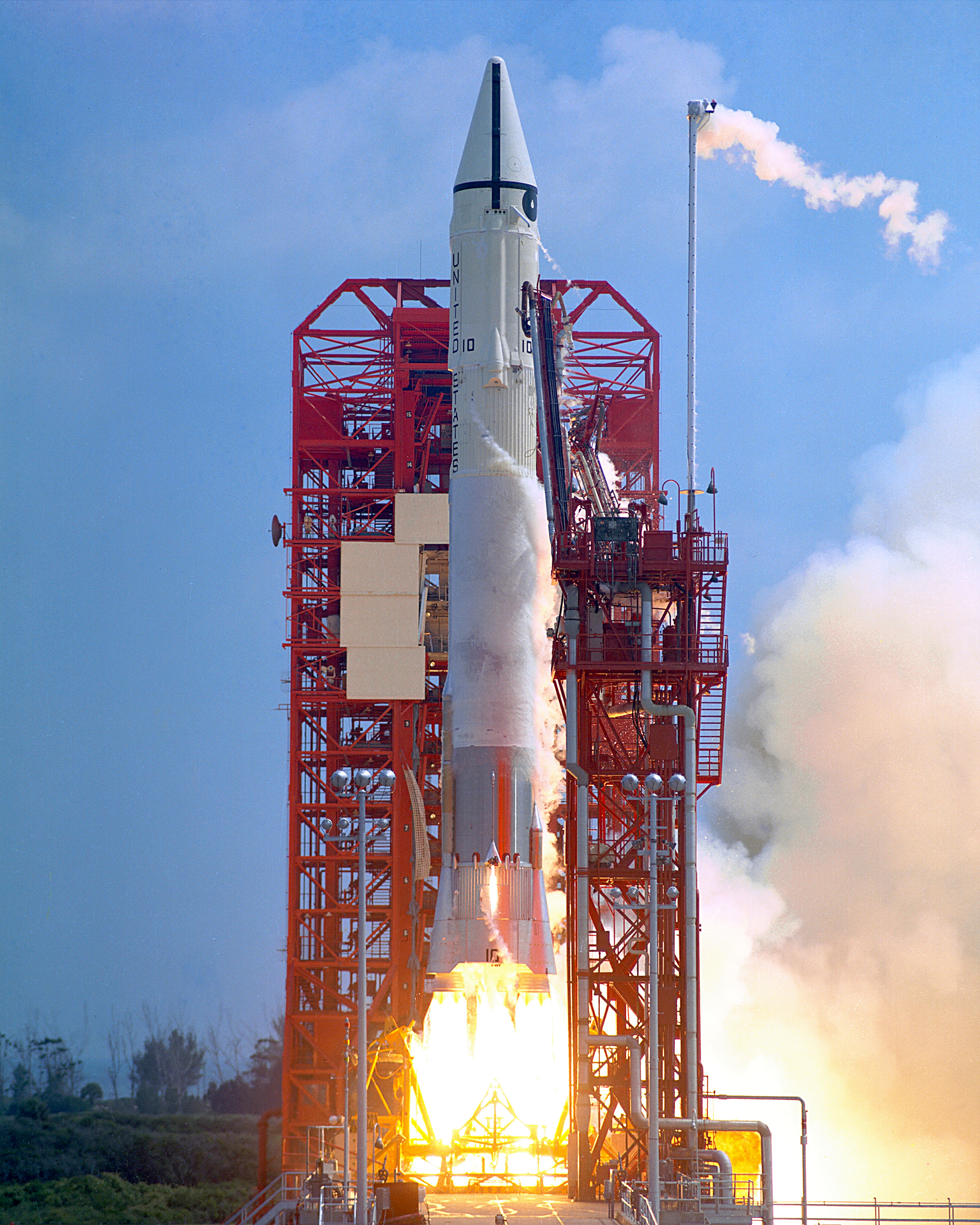
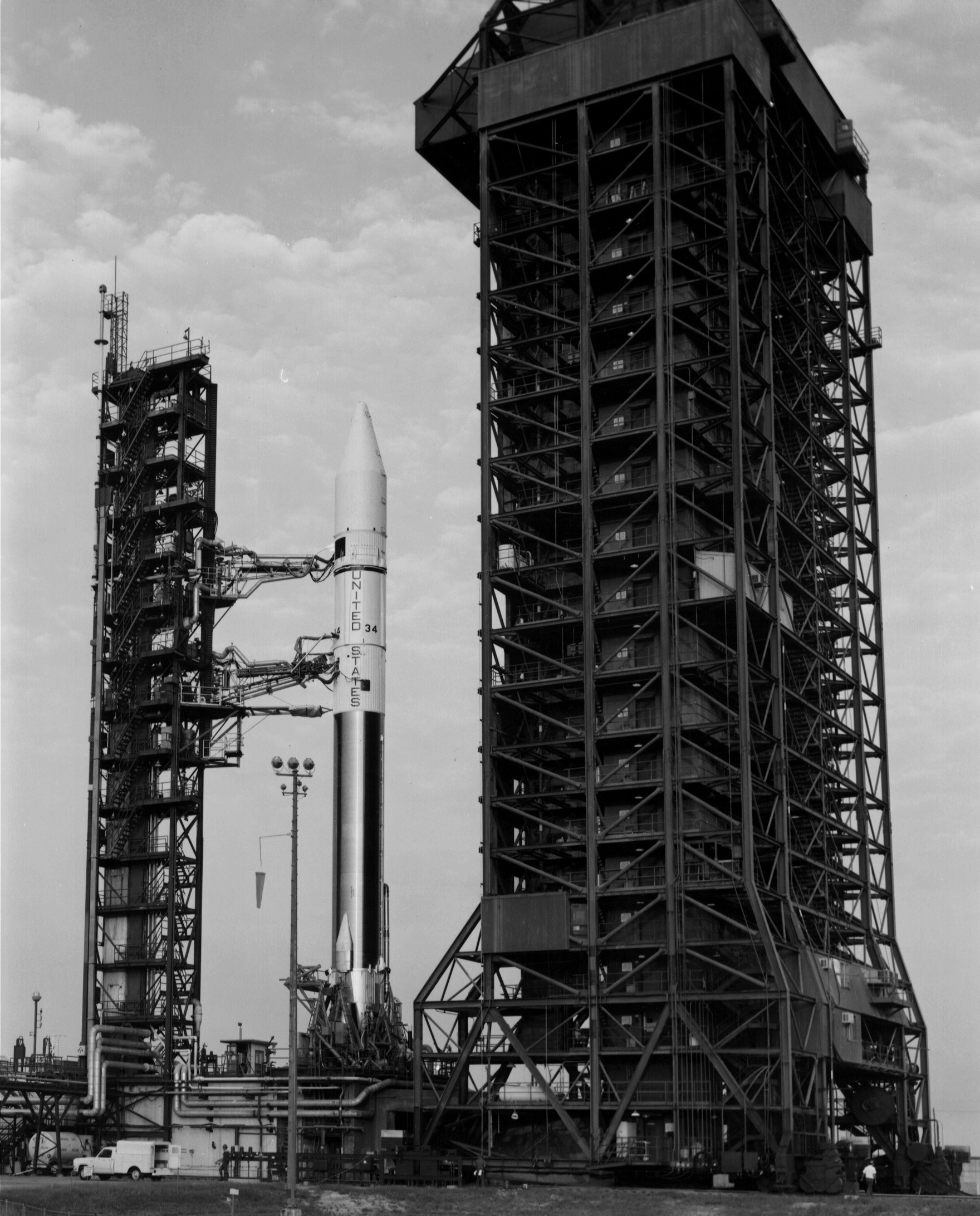
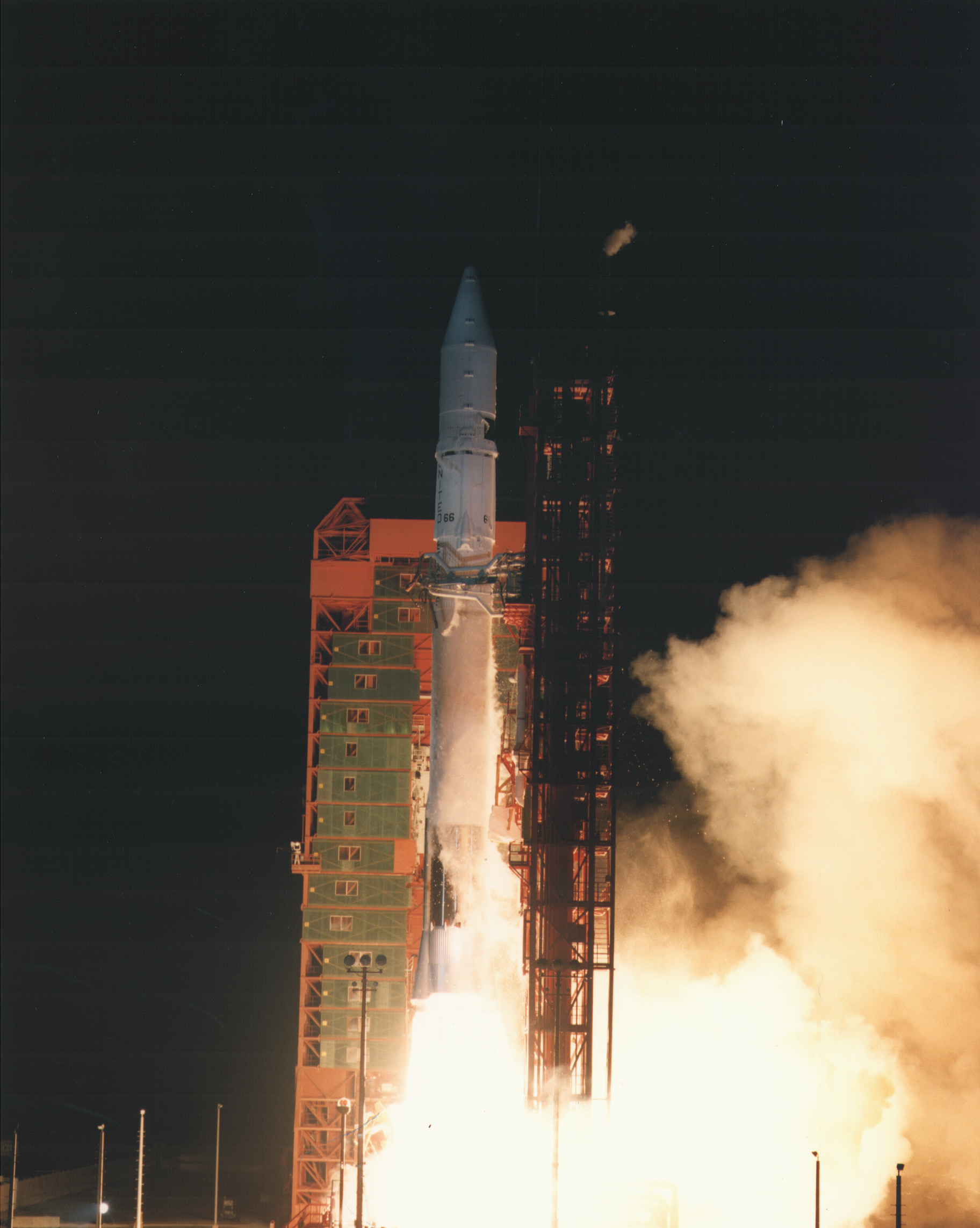
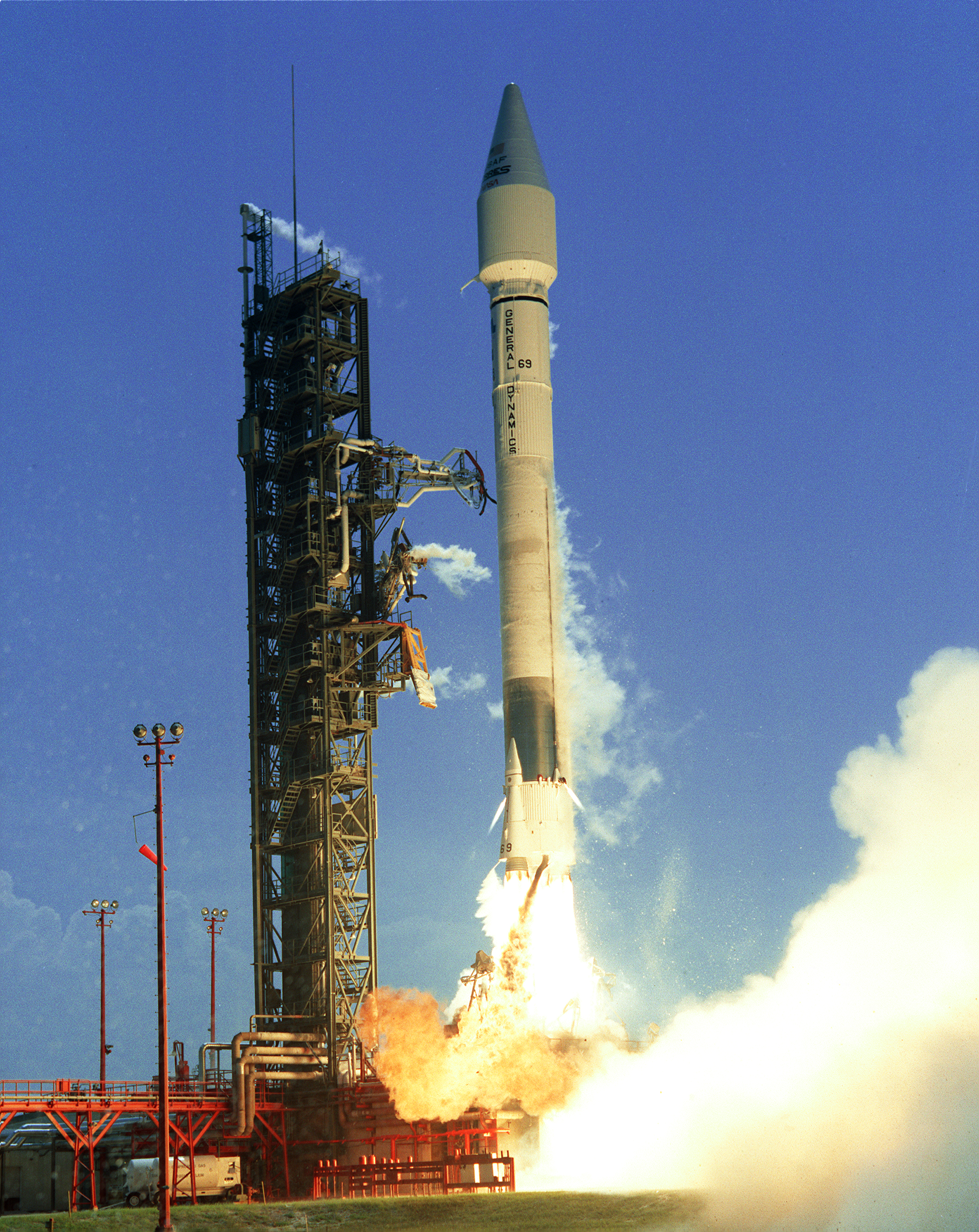
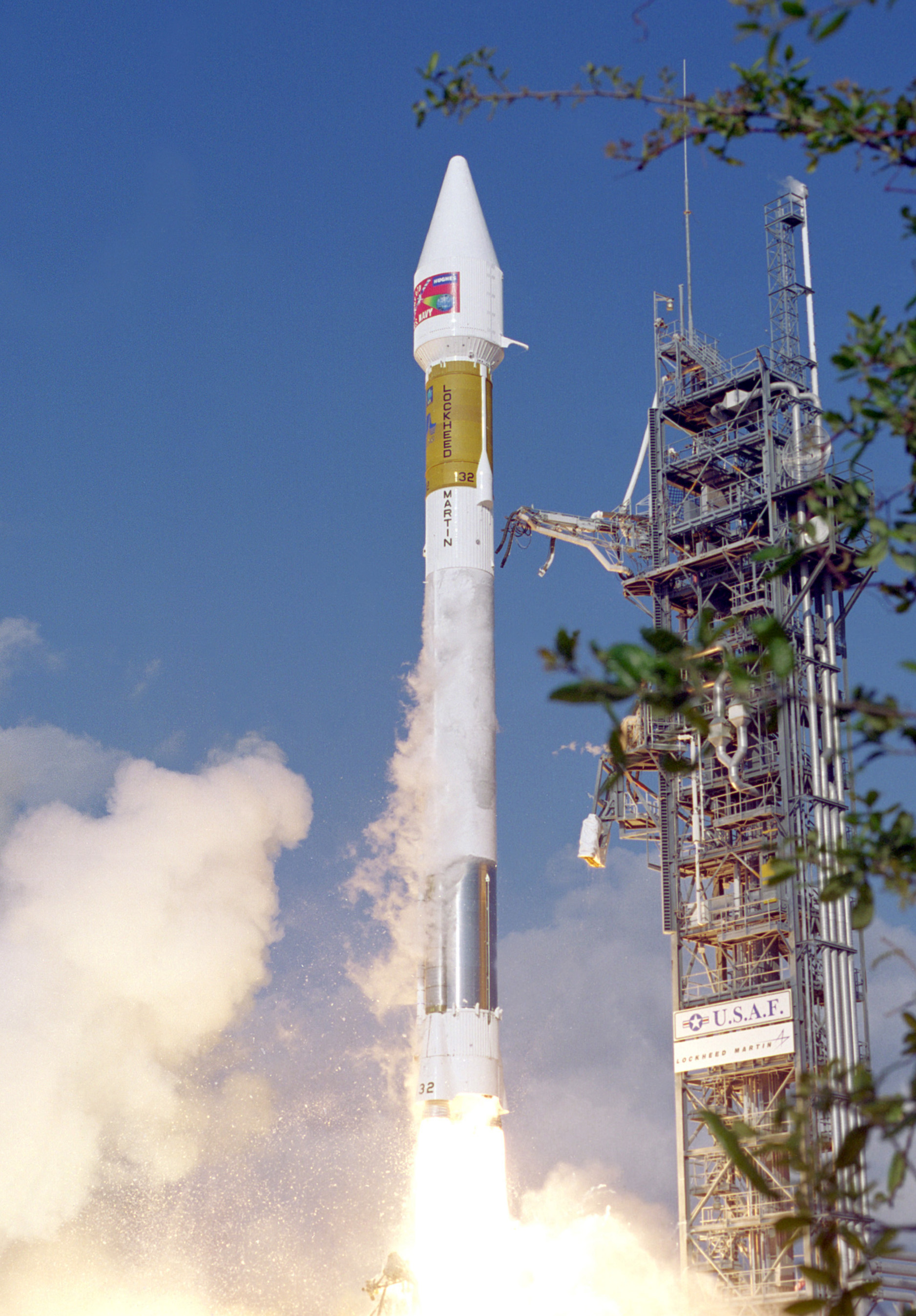
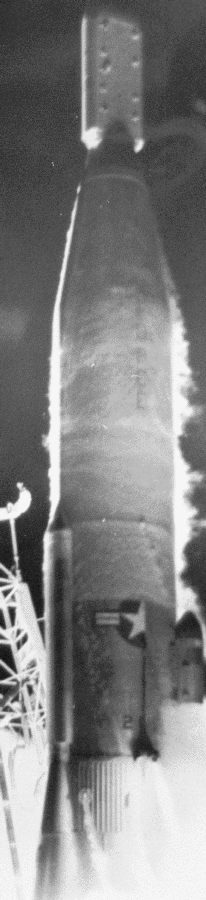
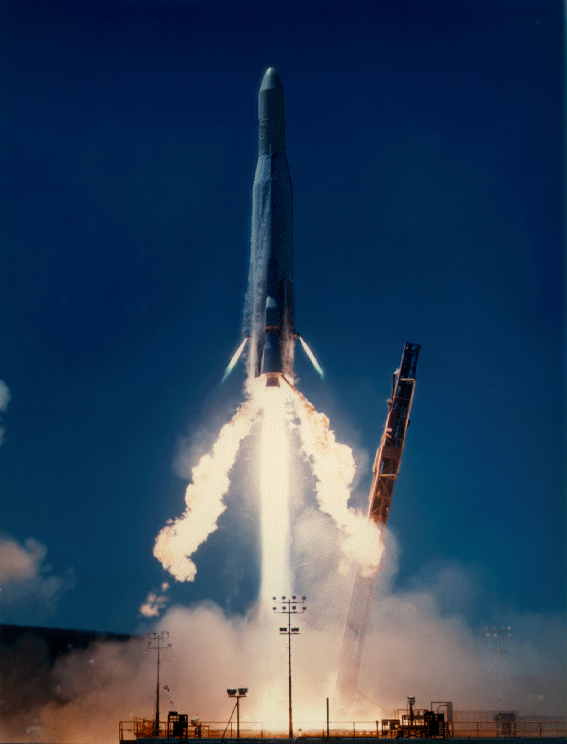
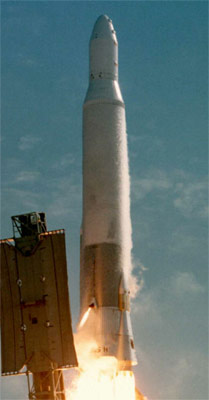
Model name	First launch	Last launch	Total launches	Successes	ICBM base	Upper stage	Notable payloads	Remarks
Atlas-Vega	-	-	0	0	Atlas E	storable propellant stage	none	Development was essentially identical to Atlas-Agena, and cancelled accordingly in 1959
Atlas-Able	1959	1960	3	0	Atlas-D/Able(Delta-A)	Altair	Pioneer P-3, Pioneer P-30, Pioneer P-31	2 rockets failed during static firing, and 3 during attempts to launch Pioneer spacecraft to the Moon
Atlas LV-3A	1960	1968	49	38	Atlas D	Agena	Mariner 2, Ranger program, Missile Defense Alarm System	The baseline Atlas-Agena sub-family vehicle
Atlas LV-3B	1959	1963	9	9	Atlas D	none	Friendship 7, Aurora 7, Sigma 7, Faith 7	Human-rated Atlas LV-3A
Atlas SLV-3	1964	1968	51	46	Atlas D	Agena	Corona, KH-7 Gambit	same as LV-3A except reliability improvements
Atlas SLV-3A	1969	1978	10	9	Atlas D	Agena	Canyon	same as SLV-3 except stretched 9.7 ft (2.97 m)
Atlas SLV-3B	1966	1966	1	1	Atlas D	Agena D	Orbiting Astronomical Observatory 1
Atlas LV-3C	1963	1967	11	8	Atlas D	Centaur C	Surveyor 1	The baseline Atlas-Centaur sub-family vehicle
Atlas SLV-3C	1967	1972	17	14	Atlas D	Centaur D	?	Same as LV-3C stretched 4.3 ft (1.3 m)
Atlas SLV-3D	1973	1983	32	29	Atlas D	Centaur D1A	Mariner 10	Same as SLV-3C except Centaur uprated and Atlas electronics integrated with Centaur
Atlas G	1984	1987	6	4	Atlas G	Centaur D1A	?	Same as SLV-3D but Atlas longer by 6.8 ft (2.06 m)
Atlas I	1990	1997	11	8	Atlas G derived	Centaur D1A derived	CRRES	Same as Atlas G except strengthened for 14.0 ft (4.27 m) payload fairing and ring laser gyro added.
Atlas II	1991	1998	10	10	Atlas G derived	Centaur D1A derived	Eutelsat	Same as Atlas I except Atlas stretched 9.0 ft (2.74 m), engines uprated, added hydrazine roll control, fixed foam insulation, deleted verniers, and Centaur stretched 3.0 ft (0.9 m). Development done by General Dynamics (now part of Lockheed Martin).
Atlas IIA	1992	2002	23	23	Atlas G derived	Centaur D1A derived	-	Same as Atlas II except Centaur RL10 engines uprated to 20,000 lbf (88 kN) of thrust and 6.5-second I_{sp} increase from extendible RL10 nozzles
Atlas IIAS	1993	2004	30	30	Atlas G derived	Centaur D1A derived	-	Same as Atlas IIA except four Castor IVA strap-on boosters added
Atlas D-OV1	1965	1967	7	6	Atlas D	none	OV (Orbiting Vehicle) flights	ICBM refurbished for orbital launch
Atlas E	1980	1995	23	21	Atlas E	none		ICBM refurbished for orbital launch
Atlas F	1968	1981	23	22	Atlas F	none	?	ICBM refurbished for orbital launch
Atlas H	1983	1987	5	5	Modified Atlas G	Centaur stage removed	NOSS satellites	Atlas G modified for West Coast Avionics. SLC 3E modified for Space Booster hold down system versus weapon system flyaway

== RD-180 era ==
=== Atlas III ===
The first stage of the Atlas III discontinued the use of three engines and 1.5 staging in favor of a single Russian-built Energomash RD-180 engine, while retaining the stage's balloon tank construction. The Atlas III continued to use the Centaur upper stage, available with single or dual RL10 engines.

=== Atlas V ===
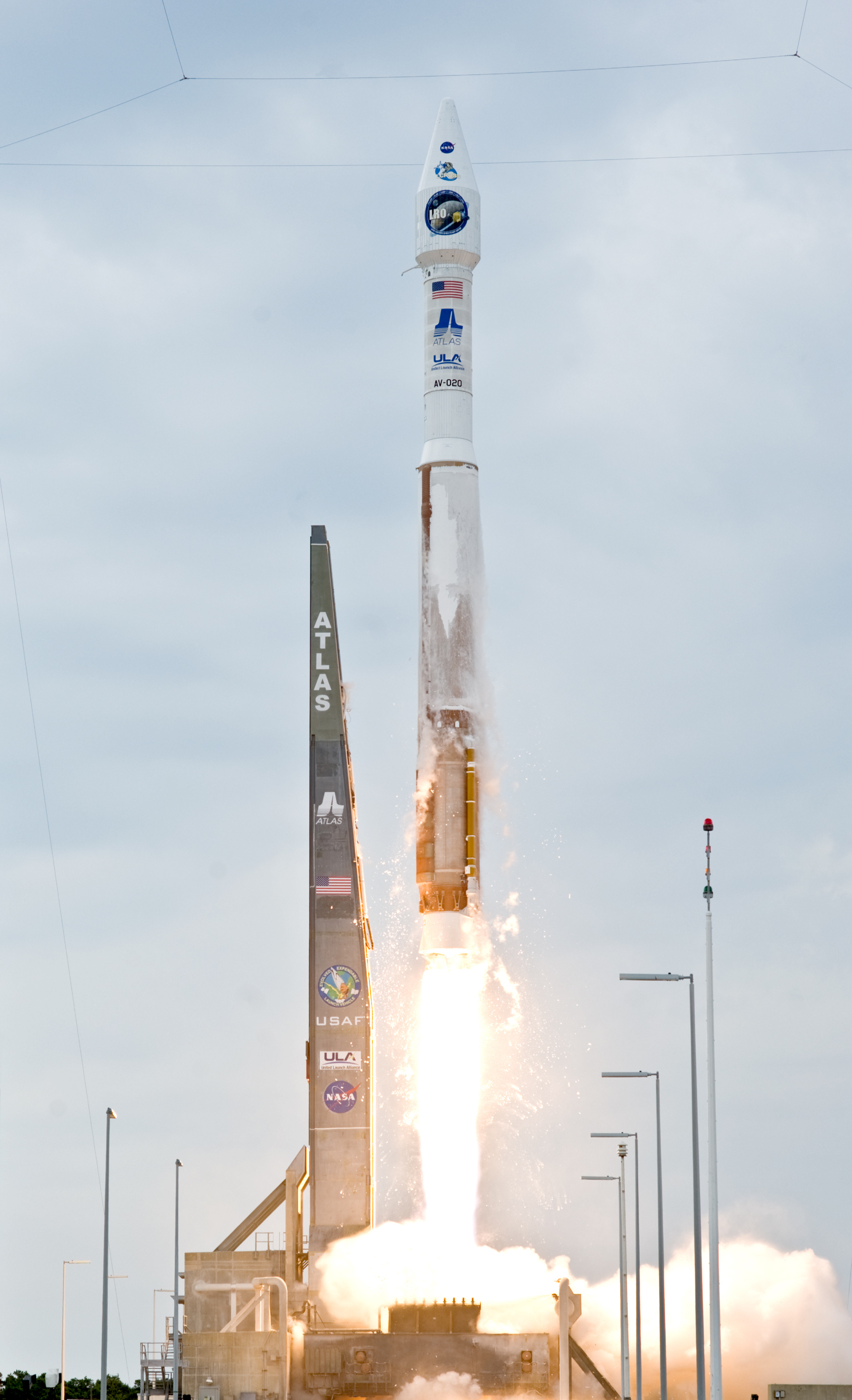
Launch of an Atlas V 401 carrying the LRO and LCROSS

The Atlas V, currently in service, was developed by Lockheed Martin as part of the US Air Force Evolved Expendable Launch Vehicle (EELV) program. The first was launched on August 21, 2002. In 2006, operation was transferred to United Launch Alliance (ULA), a joint venture between Lockheed Martin and Boeing. Lockheed Martin continued to market the Atlas V to commercial customers until September 2021, when it announced that the rocket will be retired after fulfilling the remaining 29 launch contracts. Atlas V is built in Decatur, Alabama, and maintains two launch sites: Space Launch Complex 41 at Cape Canaveral Space Force Station and Space Launch Complex 3-E at Vandenberg Space Force Base.

The Atlas V's first stage is called the Common Core Booster (CCB), which continues to use the Energomash RD-180 introduced in the Atlas III, but employs a rigid framework instead of balloon tanks. The rigid fuselage is heavier, but easier to handle and transport, eliminating the need for constant internal pressure. Up to five Aerojet Rocketdyne strap-on solid rocket boosters can be used to augment first stage thrust. The upper stage remains the Centaur, powered by a single or dual Aerojet Rocketdyne RL10 engines.

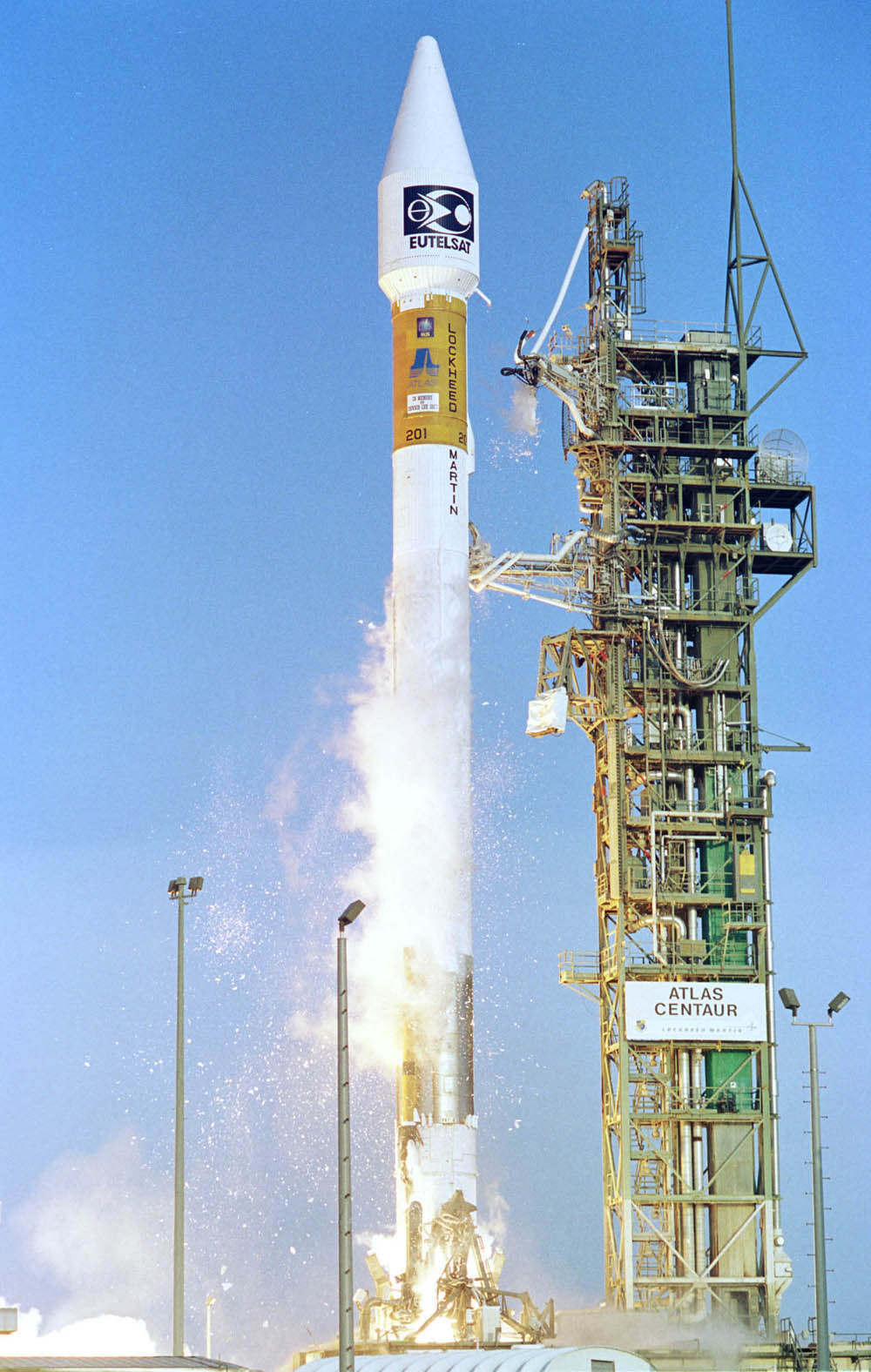
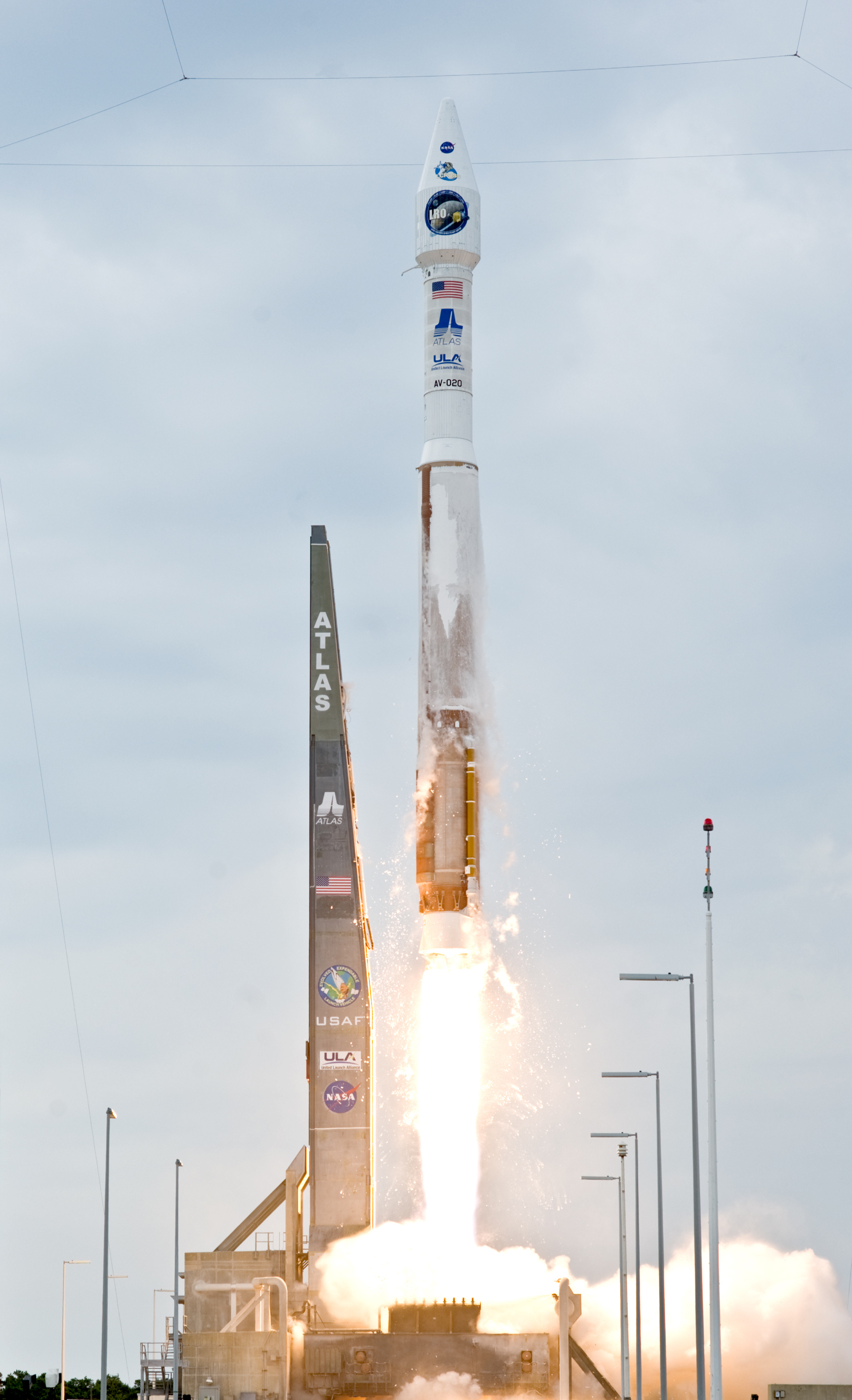
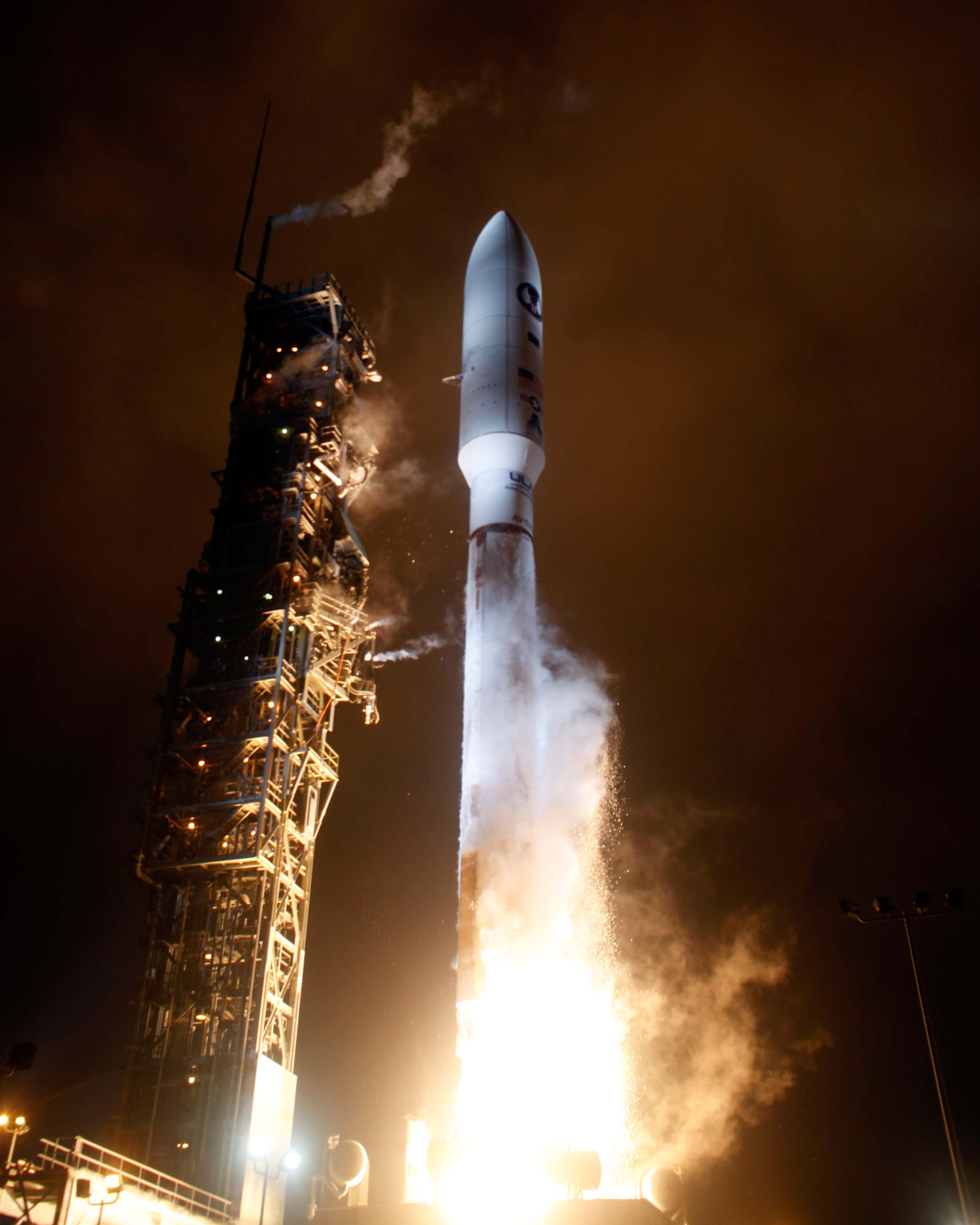
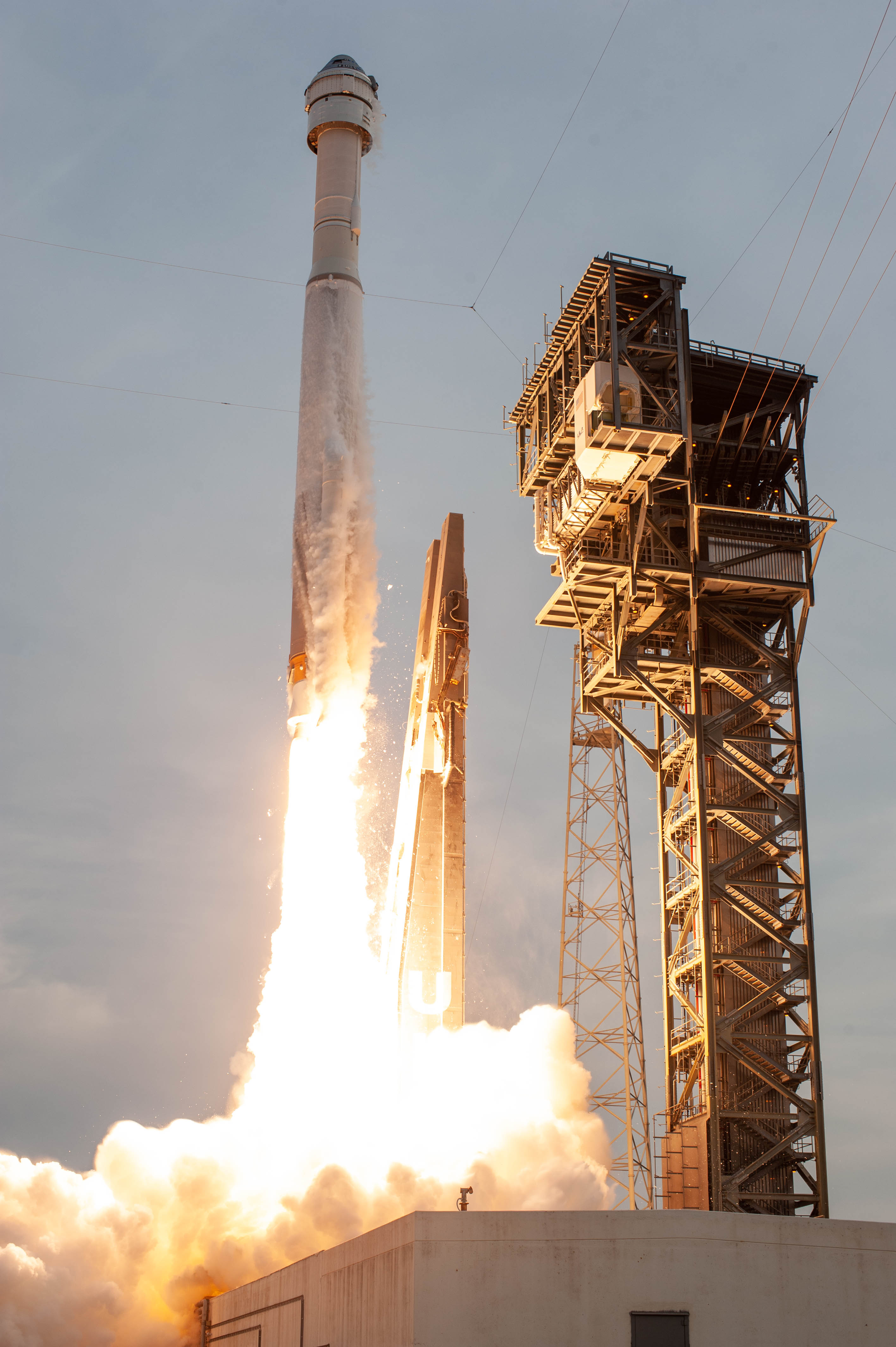
Model name	First launch	Last launch	Total launches	Successes	1st-stage engines	Upper-stage engines	Notable payloads	Remarks
Atlas IIIA	2000	2004	2	2	1xRD-180	1xRL10A	Eutelsat W4	Major revision of Atlas IIA, with new RD-180 first-stage engine, normal staging, first stage stretched 4.4 m and strengthened. First single RL10 engine Centaur.
Atlas IIIB	2002	2005	4	4	1xRD-180	1xRL10A		Same as Atlas IIIA, except for Centaur stretched 1.7 m and an optional dual engine Centaur.
Atlas V 400	2002	2022	59	58	1xRD-180	1xRL10A	Lunar Reconnaissance Orbiter, LCROSS, Mars Reconnaissance Orbiter	Major revision of Atlas III, with new first-stage structure (CCB) and with optional solid strap-on boosters.
Atlas V 500	2003	-	18	18	1xRD-180	1xRL10A	New Horizons, X-37B, Mars Science Laboratory	Revision of Atlas V 400, with optional solid strap-on boosters, and Centaur stage encapsulated inside 5.4 m payload fairing.
Atlas V N22	2019	-	3	3	1xRD-180	2xRL10A	Starliner Boeing OFT	Revision of Atlas V with optional two solid strap-on boosters, and no Centaur 5.4 m payload fairing, but the Starliner spacecraft.

=== RD-180 phaseout ===
In 2014, US Congress passed legislation restricting the purchase and use of the Russian-supplied RD-180 engine used on the first stage booster of the Atlas V. Formal study contracts were issued in June 2014 to a number of US rocket engine suppliers.

In September 2014, ULA announced that it had entered into a partnership with Blue Origin to develop the BE-4 LOX/methane engine to replace the RD-180 on the new Vulcan rocket. The new stage and engine first flew in 2024.

In December 2014, legislation to prevent the award of further military launch contracts to vehicles that use Russian-made engines was approved by the US Congress. The bill allows ULA to continue to use the 29 RD-180 engines already on order at the time. In September 2021, ULA announced that Atlas V will be retired after they fulfill their remaining launch contracts, and that all remaining RD-180s for the remaining rockets have been delivered.

=== Formerly proposed launch vehicles ===
Prior to the April 2015 announcement of the Vulcan launch vehicle, during the first decade since ULA was formed from Lockheed Martin and Boeing, there were a number of proposals and concept studies of future launch vehicles. None were subsequently funded for full-up development. Two of those concepts were the Atlas V Heavy and the Atlas Phase 2.

==== Atlas V Heavy ====
The Atlas V Heavy was a ULA concept proposal that would have used three Common Core Booster (CCB) stages strapped together to provide the capability necessary to lift a 55,000-pound (25 t) payload to low Earth orbit. ULA stated that approximately 95% of the hardware required for the Atlas HLV had already been flown on the Atlas V single-core vehicles.

A 2006 report, prepared by RAND Corporation for the Office of the Secretary of Defense, stated that Lockheed Martin had decided not to develop an Atlas V heavy-lift vehicle (HLV). The report recommended for the Air Force and the National Reconnaissance Office to "determine the necessity of an EELV heavy-lift variant, including development of an Atlas V Heavy", and to "resolve the RD-180 issue, including coproduction, stockpile, or U.S. development of an RD-180 replacement."

The lifting capability of the Atlas V HLV was to be roughly equivalent to the Delta IV Heavy. The latter utilizes RS-68 engines developed and produced domestically by Pratt & Whitney Rocketdyne.

==== Atlas V Phase 2 ====
After December 2006, with the merger of Boeing and Lockheed-Martin space operations into United Launch Alliance, the Atlas V program gained access to the tooling and processes for 18 ft (5.4 m) diameter stages used on Delta IV. An 18 ft diameter stage could have conceivably accepted dual RD-180 engines. The resulting conceptual heavy-lift vehicle was called "Atlas Phase 2" or "PH2" in the 2009 Augustine Report. An Atlas V PH2-Heavy (three 5 m stages in parallel; six RD-180s) along with Shuttle-derived, Ares V and Ares V Lite, were considered as a possible heavy lifter concept for use in future space missions in the Augustine Report. The Atlas PH2 HLV concept vehicle would have notionally been able to launch a payload mass of approximately 150,000 pounds (70 t) into an orbit of 28.5 degree inclination. The concept did not proceed onto full development, and was never built.

== See also ==
- Comparison of orbital launcher families
- Delta (rocket family)
- List of Atlas launches
