= Galaxy Express =

Galaxy Express could refer to

- Galaxy Express 999, a comic
- Samsung Galaxy Express, a smartphone
- Galaxy Express Corporation, a rocket vendor
- Galaxy Express (band), a South Korean garage rock band
- GX (rocket) (Galaxy Express GX), a Nippo-American rocket
