= GALEX (disambiguation) =

Galex may refer to:

- GALEX, an ultraviolet space telescope
- Galex (pharmaceutical company), a Slovenian company
- Galaxy Express Corporation (GALEX), Japanese rocket company
- Galex (gas company), a French company specializing in gases and related equipment
- Galex (sportswear company), an Italian sportswear company

== See also ==
- GALLEX, a germanium neutrino experiment
