= EELV =

EELV may refer to:

- Evolved Expendable Launch Vehicle, the former name of the National Security Space Launch program
- Europe Ecology – The Greens (French: Europe Écologie – Les Verts), a political party in France
