= Atlas III =

American medium expendable launch vehicle

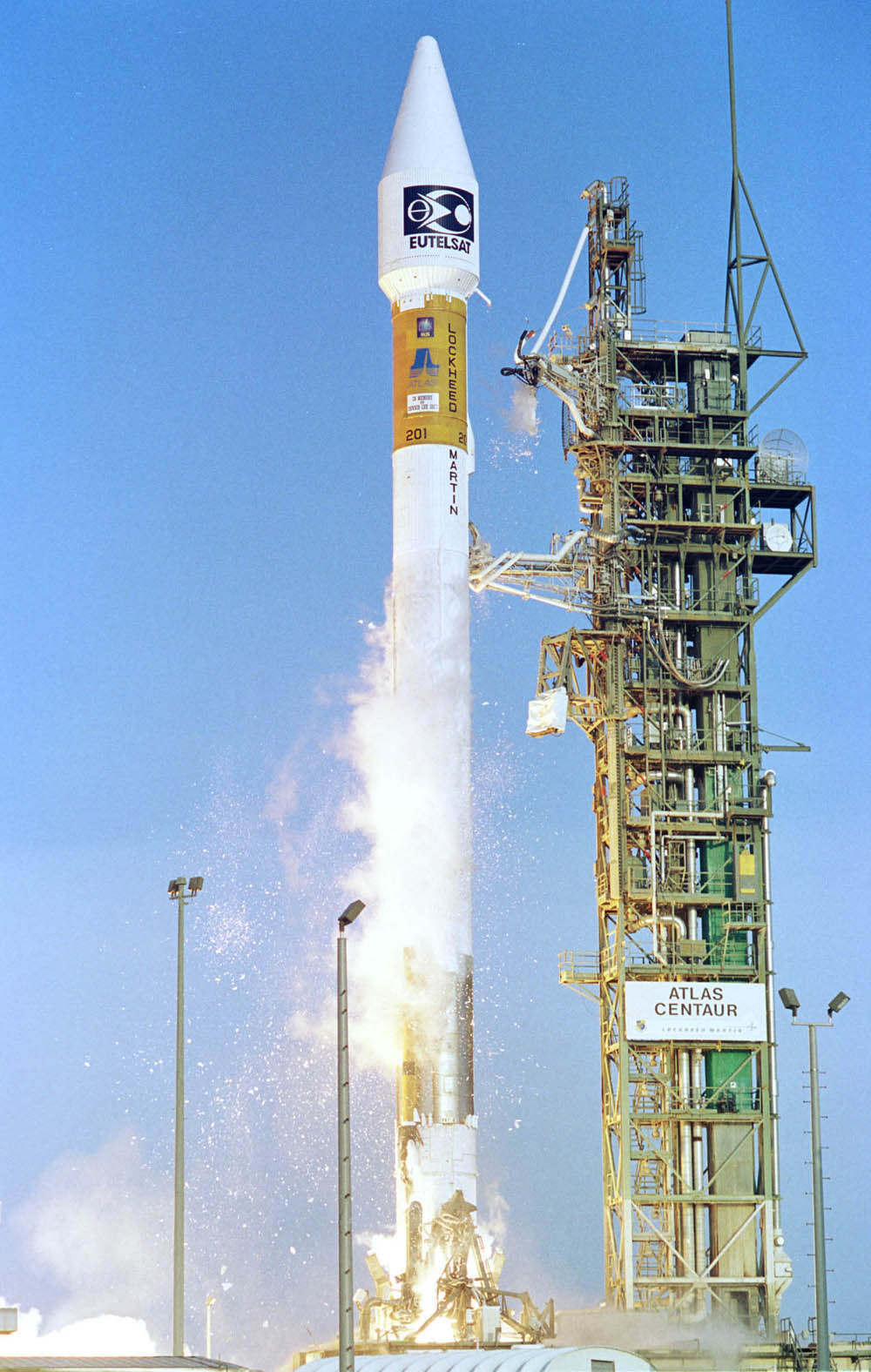
- The maiden flight of the Atlas III
- Function: Medium expendable launch vehicle
- Manufacturer: Lockheed Martin
- Country of origin: United States

Size
- Height: 52.8 m (173 ft)
- Diameter: 3.05 m (10.0 ft)
- Mass: 214,338 kg (472,534 lb)
- Stages: 2

Capacity

Payload to Low Earth orbit
- Altitude: 185 km
- Orbital inclination: 28.5°
- Mass: IIIA: 8,686 kg (19,149 lb); IIIB: 10,759 kg (23,720 lb)

Payload to Geostationary transfer orbit
- Mass: IIIA: 4,060 kg (8,950 lb); IIIB: 4,500 kg (9,900 lb)

Payload to Polar orbit
- Altitude: 185 km
- Orbital inclination: 90°
- Mass: IIIA: 7,162 kg (15,790 lb); IIIB: 9,212 kg (20,309 lb)

Associated rockets
- Family: Atlas

Launch history
- Status: Retired
- Launch sites: SLC-36B, Cape Canaveral; SLC-3E, VSFB (never used)
- Total launches: 6 (IIIA: 2, IIIB: 4)
- Success(es): 6 (IIIA: 2, IIIB: 4)
- First flight: IIIA: 24 May 2000; IIIB: 21 February 2002
- Last flight: IIIA: 13 March 2004; IIIB: 3 February 2005

First stage
- Powered by: 1 RD-180
- Maximum thrust: 4,148.7 kN (932,700 lb_{f})
- Specific impulse: 311 s (3.05 km/s)
- Burn time: 132 seconds
- Propellant: RP-1 / LOX

Second stage (Atlas IIIA/IIIB) – Centaur (SEC)
- Powered by: 1 RL10A
- Maximum thrust: 99.2 kN (22,300 lb_{f})
- Specific impulse: 451 s (4.42 km/s)
- Burn time: 738 seconds
- Propellant: LH2 / LOX

Second stage (Atlas IIIB) – Centaur (DEC)
- Powered by: 2 RL10A
- Maximum thrust: 147 kN (33,000 lb_{f})
- Specific impulse: 449 s (4.40 km/s)
- Burn time: 392 seconds
- Propellant: LH2 / LOX

The Atlas III (known as the Atlas II-AR (R for Russian) early in development) was an American orbital launch vehicle, used in the years between 2000 and 2005. It was developed from the highly successful Atlas II rocket and shared many components. It was the first member of the Atlas family since the Atlas A to feature a "normal" staging method, compared to the previous Atlas family members, which were equipped with two jettisonable outboard engines on the first (booster) stage (with a single center engine serving as the sustainer). The Atlas III was developed further to create the Atlas V.

== Description ==
The Atlas III was developed from the highly successful Atlas II rocket and consisted of two stages. The first stage was heavily modified from Atlas II, and the upper stage remained the Centaur. The Atlas III was produced in two versions. The baseline was the Atlas IIIA, but the Atlas IIIB, featuring a stretched twin-engine version of the Centaur upper stage, was also produced.

=== First stage ===
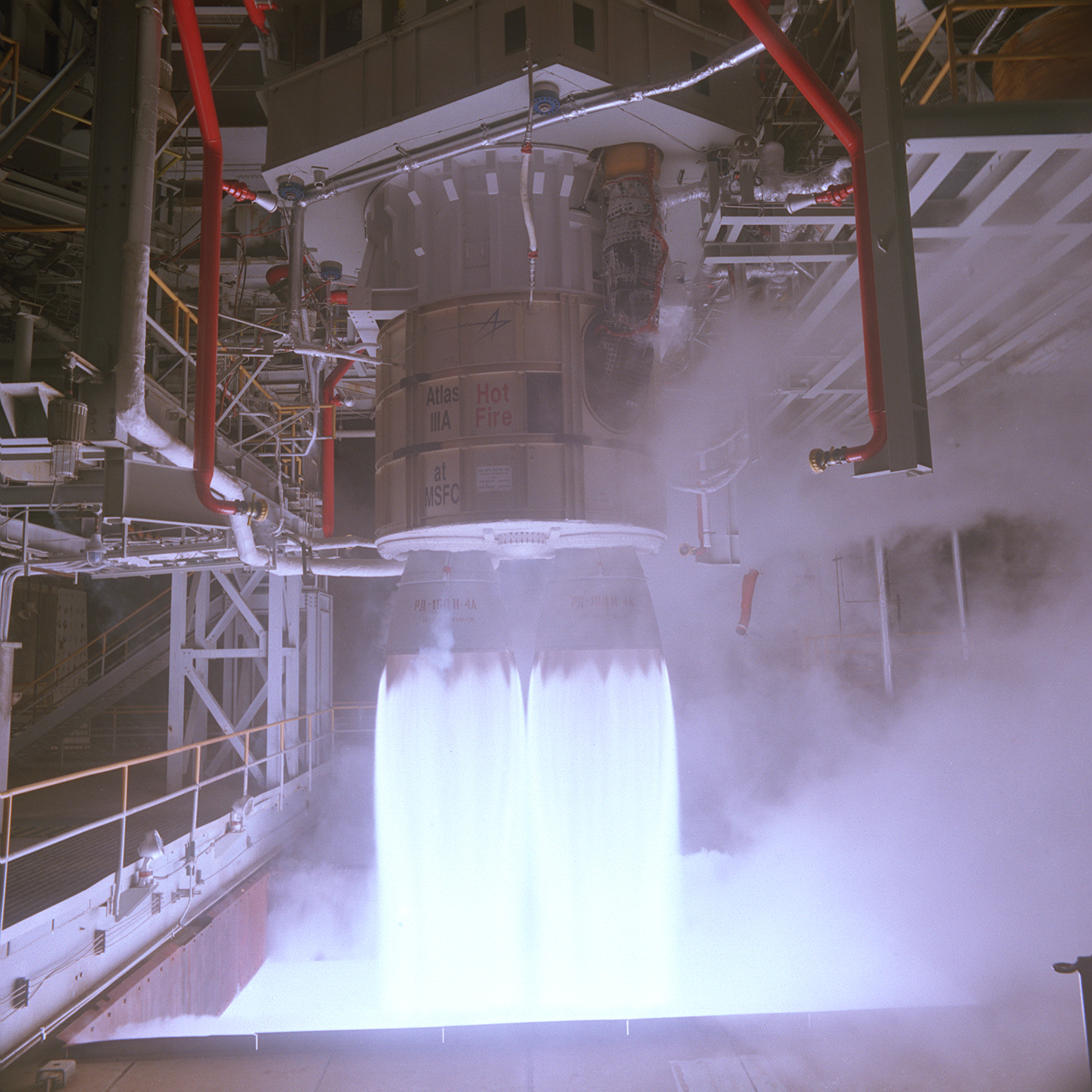
An RD-180 engine undergoes a test firing at NASA's Marshall Space Flight Center in November 1998.

The first stage of Atlas III was derived from that of Atlas II. Its propellant tanks were 3 m (9.8 ft) longer than those on Atlas II, making more propellant available to the engine and increasing the vehicle's performance. Over 183 tons of RP-1 and liquid oxygen propellants were stored inside the tanks. The storied "stage-and-a-half" system used on all Atlas rockets from Atlas B to Atlas II, where three engines are lit on the ground, and two of them are dropped away during flight, was replaced by a single Russian RD-180 engine, boasting higher thrust and efficiency than previous engines. Unlike Atlas II and the later Atlas V, there was no option for solid rocket motors to be added to the first stage. 12 retrorockets were mounted on the stage to aid in separating it from Centaur during flight.

The first stage continued to make use of the balloon tank technology of previous Atlas rockets, where the stainless-steel tank walls were thin and had to remain pressurized in order to not collapse. The tanks were pressurized with helium gas, which was stored in 13 bottles throughout the stage.

The first stage was unchanged between the Atlas IIIA and IIIB variants.

The Atlas Roll Control Module, which contained several hydrazine thrusters and helped maintain roll stability on Atlas II, was removed on the Atlas III. The dual-chamber RD-180 was therefore responsible for gimballing to control the rocket's pitch, yaw, and roll during first-stage flight.

=== Centaur second stage ===
The second stage of Atlas III was the Centaur. It was powered by one or two Pratt & Whitney (later Aerojet Rocketdyne) RL10 engines, fueled by liquid hydrogen and liquid oxygen. Compared to the Atlas II, the added thrust and efficiency of the first stage of Atlas III allowed for one RL10 engine to be removed from Centaur, and Atlas III was the first Atlas to offer a single-engine Centaur. The engines of a dual-engine Centaur were mounted directly on the aft propellant tank bulkhead, whereas the engine on a single-engine Centaur was mounted on a specially made beam connected to those existing dual-engine mounts. The single-engine Centaur featured an RL10A-4-1 engine with a 51 cm (20 in) extendible nozzle, which increased the engine's thrust by 1.4 kN and specific impulse by 6.5 seconds.

Centaur hosted the vehicle's avionics and flight computers and controlled the entire flight. The RL10 engine on the single-engine Centaur featured electromechanical gimballing, as opposed to the hydraulic gimballing on other variants.

The tanks of Centaur were balloon tanks like the first stage, made from stainless steel. PVC foam insulation was installed on the outside of the tank walls to help limit propellant boiloff inside the tanks.

Two variants of Centaur flew on Atlas III:

- Centaur II, which flew on Atlas IIIA, was only offered with one RL10 engine. This stage is nearly identical to the Centaur II of Atlas II, with the only major difference being only one engine attached.
- Centaur III, aka Common Centaur, which flew on Atlas IIIB, was available with one or two RL10 engines. Its tanks were 1.68 m (5 ft 6 in) longer than those of the Centaur II, offering a substantial increase in propellant capacity and increasing the stage's performance. This stage would later fly on the Atlas V.

Flying a mission on an Atlas IIIB with a dual-engine Centaur provided a nearly 400 kg boost in payload capability to geostationary transfer orbit compared to using a single-engine Centaur.

An Extended Mission Kit (EMK) was available for Centaur. This kit included additional helium bottles, radiation shielding on the LOX tank and electronics, and thermal paint to maintain stable temperatures for electronics.

=== Payload fairing ===
Two aluminum fairing models (which previously flew on the Atlas II) were available for the Atlas III, both with a 4.2 m (14 ft) diameter:

- Large, with a height of 12.2 m (40 ft) and a mass of 2,087 kg (4,601 lb)
- Extended, with a height of 13.1 m (43 ft) and a mass of 2,255 kg (4,971 lb)

Fairing selection had a small but noticeable impact on the performance of Atlas III. For example, when going to a 185 km (115 mi) low Earth orbit, flying with the Extended payload fairing would reduce the payload capacity by around 45 kg (99 lb) compared to flying with the Large payload fairing.

Both fairing options were still flown on the Atlas V rocket until 2022. For the Atlas V, these fairings were part of the 400-series of that rocket, and a further extended option ("Extra Extended") was available.

== Launches ==
The first flight of the Atlas III occurred on 24 May 2000, launching the Eutelsat W4 communications satellite into a geosynchronous orbit. All Atlas III launches were made from Space Launch Complex 36B at Cape Canaveral Space Force Station (CCSFS), which at that time was called Cape Canaveral Air Force Station (CCAFS). The Atlas III made its sixth and final flight on 3 February 2005, with a classified payload for the United States National Reconnaissance Office. Although its career was short, Atlas III performed 6 successful missions with no failures.

== Proposed derivatives ==
The GX rocket, formerly under development by Galaxy Express Corporation, was originally intended to use the boost stage of the Atlas III, provided by Lockheed-Martin, and a newly designed upper stage. It would have launched from the Tanegashima Space Center, south of Kyūshū, Japan. In December 2009, the Japanese government decided to cancel the GX project.

The Atlas III first stage was considered as a Removable Propulsion Module (RPM) for the Starbooster concept.

== See also ==
- Comparison of orbital launchers families
- Atlas II
- Atlas V
