= National Security Space Launch =

Expendable launch system program of the United States Space Force

A Falcon 9 launching a GPS Block III satellite from Cape Canaveral SLC-40.

National Security Space Launch (NSSL) is a program of the United States Space Force (USSF) intended to assure access to space for United States Department of Defense and other United States government payloads. The program is managed by the Assured Access to Space Directorate (SSC/AA) of the Space Force's Space Systems Command (SSC), in partnership with the National Reconnaissance Office.

Started in 1994 as the Evolved Expendable Launch Vehicle (EELV) launch system program, the initial program goal was to make government space launches more affordable and reliable, leading to the development of the Boeing Delta IV and Lockheed Martin Atlas V EELV families. These remained the primary launch vehicles for U.S. military satellites, and were later joined by the Falcon 9 developed by SpaceX.

On 1 March 2019, the program name was changed from EELV to National Security Space Launch (NSSL) to better reflect the growing commercial launch market and the changing nature of launch contracts, including the potential for reusable launch vehicles.

The NSSL program launches the nation's most valuable military satellites; contracts to launch lower value payloads, such as those of the Space Test Program, are awarded using different methodologies.

== History ==
=== Initial program goals ===
The USAF began the EELV program in 1994, following many years of government-funded studies into improved systems and architecture. The intent was to replace legacy vehicles, including Delta II, Atlas II, and Titan IV. EELVs were to reduce costs by being based on standardized fairings, liquid core vehicles, upper stages, and solid rocket boosters. A Standard Payload Interface bus was also proposed as a way to save money and improve efficiency.

Reducing the cost of launches and ensuring national access to space were the two main goals of the USAF space launch/EELV program. Some of the reasons why assured access to space is a priority for the United States are stated in National Presidential Directive Number 40, which reads:

Access to space through U.S. space transportation capabilities is essential to:

1. place critical United States Government assets and capabilities into space;
2. augment space-based capabilities in a timely manner in the event of increased operational needs or minimize disruptions due to on-orbit satellite failures, launch failures, or deliberate actions against U.S. space assets;
3. support government and commercial human space flight.

The United States, therefore, must maintain robust, responsive, and resilient U.S. space transportation capabilities to assure access to space.

Procurement of EELV boosters for military space launch was to evolve to more closely match commercial practice. The initial bids came from four major defense contractors: Lockheed Martin, Boeing, McDonnell Douglas, and Alliant Techsystems. Each of the bids included a variety of concepts. Boeing initially proposed using the RS-25 Space Shuttle main engine.

=== 1990s-2000s ===
In October 1998 two initial launch services contracts (known as Buy 1) were awarded. Along with the award of two development agreements, the total amount was more than $3 billion. Boeing was awarded a contract for 19 out of the 28 launches; Lockheed Martin was awarded a contract for the other 9. Boeing received $1.38 billion, and Lockheed Martin received $650 million for the launches. Boeing and Lockheed Martin were each awarded US$500 million for the final phase of the bid. Boeing developed the Delta IV based around Common Booster Cores and the Delta Cryogenic Second Stage, while Lockheed Martin developed the Atlas V based around Common Core Boosters and the Centaur upper stage.

In 2002, both Delta IV and Atlas V delivered their first payloads to orbit, the two commercial satellites Eutelsat 33B and Eutelsat 8 West C, respectively.

In 2003, Boeing was found to be in possession of proprietary documents from Lockheed Martin. The USAF moved 7 launches from Delta IV to Atlas V. To end litigation and competition for a limited market, both companies agreed to form the United Launch Alliance (ULA) joint venture. Each company has a 50% stake in ULA.

=== 2010s ===
Prior to 2012, the USAF was advancing another program, the Reusable Booster System and other follow-on technologies, and up to early 2012 issued contract awards for various aspects of it, before the program was cancelled in October 2012.

In December 2012, the DoD announced a re-opening of the EELV-class launch vehicle market to competition while authorizing the USAF to proceed with a block buy of "up to" 36 boosters from ULA. At the same time, another 14 boosters were to be procured competitively beginning in 2015, with the initial launches to be performed in 2017.

The USAF signed a contract at that time with SpaceX for two launches in 2014 and 2015 to serve as proving flights to support the certification process for the Falcon 9 v1.1 and Falcon Heavy. In April 2014, after the launches were contracted, SpaceX sued the United States Air Force, arguing that the RD-180 engines, produced in Russia by the government owned NPO Energomash and used by the Atlas V, violated sanctions against the Russian government. The USAF and SpaceX settled the lawsuit in Jan 2015 by opening up more launches to competitive bidding. The USAF certified the Falcon 9 in May 2015, and in 2016 SpaceX won a contract under the EELV program to launch a GPS Block III satellite payload to MEO.

=== 2018 to 2020s ===
The USAF began the process of competitively selecting the next generation NSSL vehicles in 2018. Announced performance requirements include:

Orbit description	Apogee (km) x perigee (km)	Inclination (degrees)	Mass to orbit (kg)	Payload category
LEO	926 x 926	63.4	6,800	A, B
Polar 1	830 x 830	98.2	7,030	A, B
Polar 2	830 x 830	98.2	17,000	C
MEO	18,200 x 18,200	50.0	5,330	A, B
MEO Transfer	20,400 x 1,000	55.0	4,080	A, B
GEO 1	35,786 x 35,786	0.0	2,300	A, B
GEO 2	35,786 x 35,786	0.0	6,600	C
GTO	35,786 x 190	27.0	8,165	A, B
Molniya	39,200 x 1,200	63.4	5,220	A, B

Category A payloads fit within a 4 m diameter payload envelope, category B payloads fit within a 5 m diameter payload envelope, and category C payloads require an extended 5 m diameter envelope.

The USAF and United States Space Force (USSF) plan to use the next generation NSSL launch vehicles until at least 2030.

== Standard payload interfaces ==
=== Secondary payloads ===
See EELV Secondary Payload Adapter (ESPA rings with radial ports)

== Launch vehicles ==
Since 2019 there have been four vehicles certified by the Department of Defense to conduct NSSL launches: Atlas V, Delta IV Heavy, Falcon 9 and Falcon Heavy. Delta IV Medium was retired in August 2019 and Delta IV Heavy retired in April 2024. After a two-year solicitation and competition process in 2018–2020, in August 2020 the USSF selected SpaceX (F9 and FH) and ULA's yet-to-be-certified Vulcan Centaur to supply US military launch requirements in 2022–2027. New Glenn was considered for the first time in NSSL Phase 3 Lane 1 bidding.

=== Retired ===
==== Delta IV medium ====
Delta IV Medium flew with two or four SRBs on a single Common Booster Core. The DCSS had 4 m diameter and 5 m diameter versions, with matching diameter payload fairings. Delta IV CBCs and DCSSs were integrated horizontally before being transported to the launchpad. The Delta IV Medium retired after the 22 August 2019 launch of a GPS-III satellite. The mission used a Delta IV M+(4,2) two SRBs, and a 4 m diameter DCSS and payload fairing, the final use of the 4 m fairing.

==== Delta IV Heavy ====
The Delta IV Heavy launch vehicle used three Common Booster Cores (CBCs) each powered by a Pratt and Whitney Rocketdyne RS-68A engine, a Delta Cryogenic Second Stage 5 m (DCSS) powered by an RL10, and a 5 m payload fairing. Delta IV CBCs and DCSSs were integrated horizontally before being transported to the launchpad. In 2020, ULA announced retirement of the Delta IV after 5 more launches. The final flight occurred in April 2024.

==== Atlas V ====
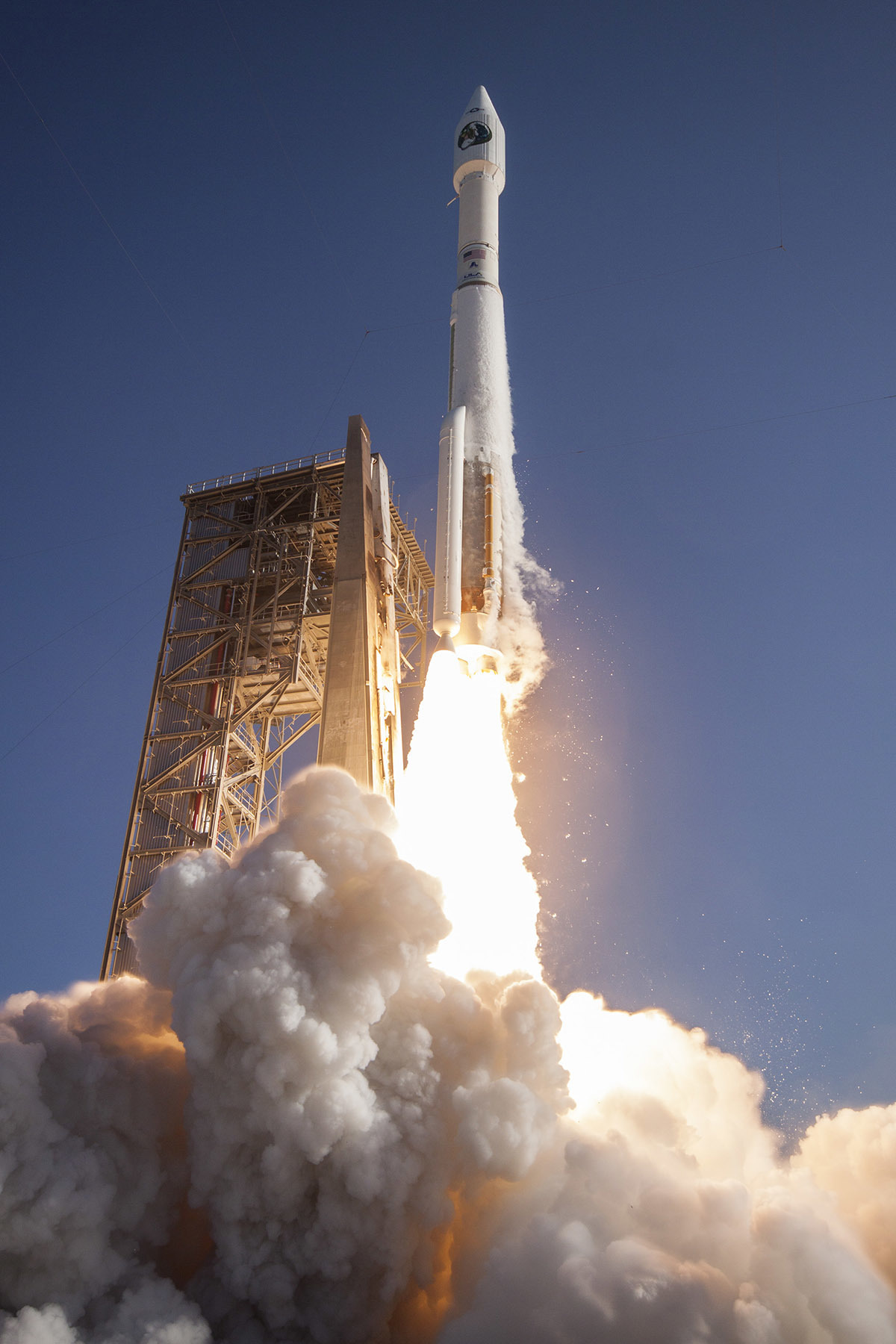
Atlas V liftoff from SLC-41 for NROL-61 mission in 2016.

Each Atlas V launch vehicle is based on a Common Core Booster powered by one NPO Energomash RD-180 engine with two combustion chambers and a Centaur upper stage powered by one or two Pratt & Whitney Rocketdyne RL10A-4-2 engines. Up to five Aerojet Rocketdyne Graphite-Epoxy Motor solid rocket boosters can be added to increase vehicle performance, and two diameters of payload fairing are available.

A three-digit naming convention is used for the Atlas V configuration identification. The first digit represents the payload fairing diameter, either 4.2 meters (indicated by a 4) or 5.4 (indicated by a 5) meters. The second digit is for the number of solid rocket boosters (0 to 5) to be used, and the third digit the number of RL-10 engines on the Centaur upper stage (1 or 2). As an example, an Atlas V 551 has a 5.4-meter payload fairing, 5 SRBs, and 1 RL-10.

In August 2021, ULA announced that Atlas V would be retired, and all 29 remaining launches had been sold. The last launch for NSSL happened on 30 July 2024. As of August 2025, 13 launches remain, all for non-DoD launches.

=== Certified and active ===
==== Falcon 9 ====
The main features of the Falcon 9 in its Block 5 version include two stages, both powered by LOX and RP-1, with nine Merlin 1D engines on the first stage and one Merlin 1D Vacuum engine on the second stage. This launcher features a reusable first stage and fairings, which lowers the cost per mission.

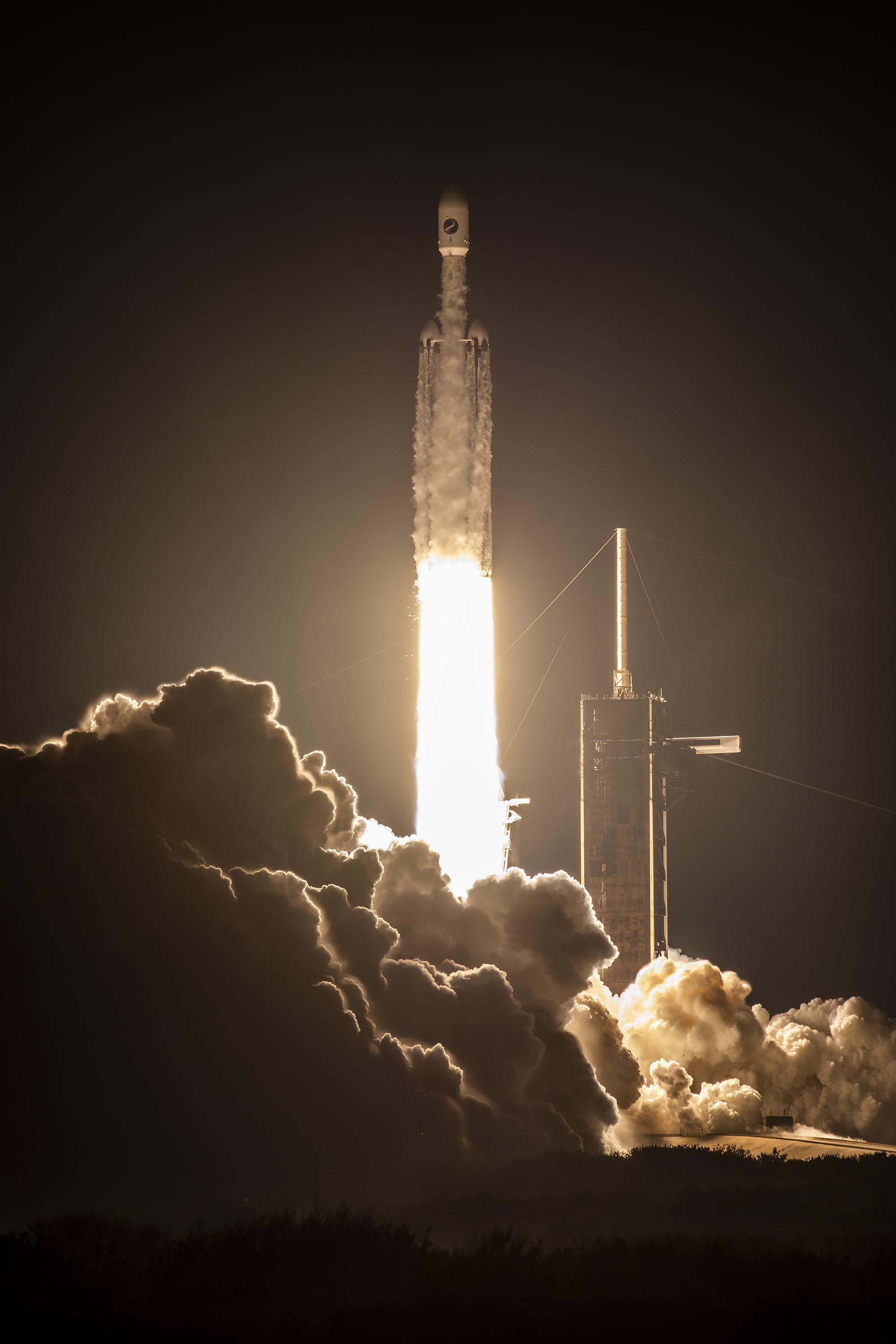
Falcon Heavy launching X-37B as mission USSF-52 from LC-39A in 2023.

GPS-IIIA USA-289 was the first NSSL-type B5 Falcon 9 launch. The launch occurred on December 23, 2018.

==== Falcon Heavy ====
The Falcon Heavy is a super heavy-lift rocket developed and produced by SpaceX. It has been certified for the NSSL program after the STP-2 launch completed on 25 June 2019, as confirmed by the commander of the Air Force Space and Missile Systems Center, Lt. Gen. Thompson. He clarified: "I certified them to compete last year" and "one of the requirements behind certification is to fly three missions." This requirement has been satisfied by the Falcon Heavy test flight in February 2018, Arabsat-6A in April 2019, and the STP-2 launch in June 2019. Falcon Heavy has been certified for two Phase 1A reference orbits and as of 2019, "it's not certified for all of our most stressing national security space orbits," Thompson said. The USAF is working with SpaceX to mature their Falcon Heavy's design.

As of December 2023, it has flown three classified national security flights: USSF-44, USSF-67, and USSF-52.

==== Vulcan Centaur ====
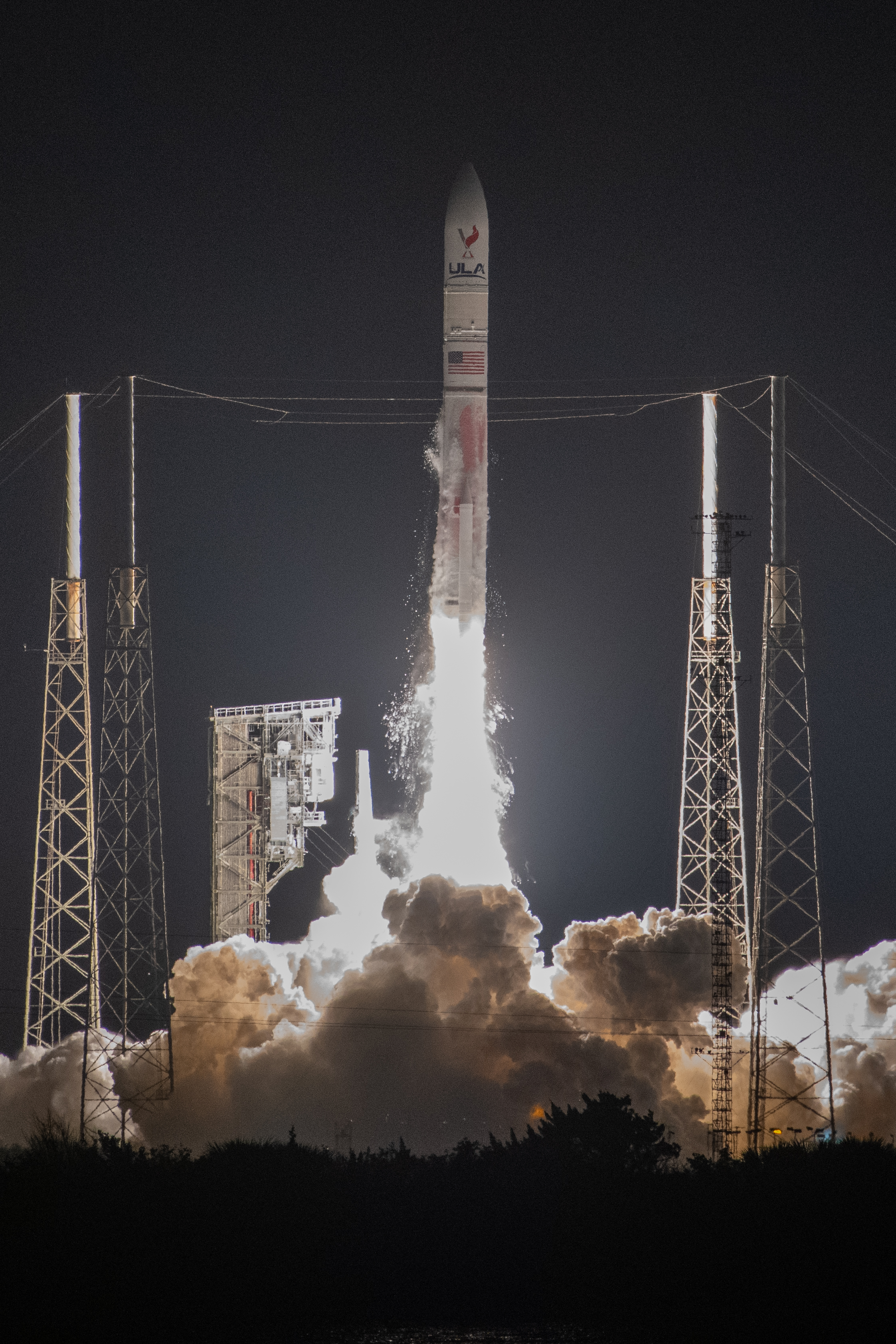
Vulcan Centaur liftoff from Space Launch Complex 41 at Cape Canaveral

Vulcan Centaur is a heavy-lift rocket developed and produced by ULA, while incorporating engines built by Blue Origin. It completed its two certification flights on 8 January and 4 October 2024, and launched its first NSSL mission in August 2025.

=== Next generation vehicle competition ===
In 2018, a competitive contract award to launch national security spacecraft was conducted between United Launch Alliance (ULA), Northrop Grumman Innovation Systems (NGIS), Blue Origin, and SpaceX.

==== Phase 1: development of detailed designs ====
Two providers were to be selected to launch spacecraft to a number of reference orbits. In October 2018, the USAF awarded development funding to ULA, NGIS, and Blue Origin to further the design of their rockets before a subsequent competition for award to build the launch vehicles. SpaceX received none of this funding to develop their designs, as both the Falcon 9 and Falcon Heavy had completed development and were already flying.

New Glenn

Blue Origin was awarded $500 million of phase 1 funding for further development of New Glenn as a potential competitor in future contracts. As of 2019, Blue Origin expected a first launch of New Glenn in 2021. In the event, no phase 2 funding from the US government was forthcoming after August 2020 when ULA Vulcan and SpaceX were selected by the Air Force. Blue Origin is considered likely to continue building and testing New Glenn, in part since they were already privately funding development prior to the Air Force NSSL competition.

OmegA

Northrop Grumman was awarded US$792 million of phase 1 funding in 2018 for development of OmegA. OmegA was a rocket design with two main solid stages, a cryogenic upper stage, and the possibility of additional solid-rocket strap-on boosters. As of 2019, the first flight has been stated by NGIS to be expected in 2021. In the event, no phase 2 funding from the US government was forthcoming after August 2020 when ULA Vulcan and SpaceX were selected by the Air Force. In 2020, Northrop Grumman announced the cancellation of OmegA.

Vulcan Centaur

ULA was awarded $967 million of phase 1 funding for further development of Vulcan Centaur as a potential competitor in future contracts. On 12 August 2019, ULA submitted Vulcan Centaur for phase 2 of the USAF's launch services competition.

==== Phase 2: selection of two launch vendors ====
On 12 August 2019, at least three of the four companies submitted their final bids for the launch services competition. SpaceX bid the existing Falcon 9 and Falcon Heavy, while Blue Origin was expected to bid New Glenn, ULA bid Vulcan Centaur, and NGIS's bid status was not reported. Blue Origin also filed a pre-award protest of the request for proposal arguing that the requirements were ambiguous.

The US Department of the Air Force announced the results of the approximately US$3.5 billion National Security Space Launch Phase 2 Launch Service Procurement on 7 August 2020. SpaceX and ULA were the two vendors selected via the competition to supply launches to the US military in the 2022–2026 timeframe. The US Space Force (USSF) plans 30–34 launches during these five fiscal years. ULA is expected to handle 60 percent of the launches while SpaceX will handle 40 percent of the launches over the five-year period.

The contract type for the phase 2 contracts is new for NSSL launches as it will be a "firm-fixed-price, indefinite-delivery" type of launch contract. The awards in August 2020 are a major part of "the transition of the national security launch program to take advantage of commercial innovation and private investments in launch vehicles."

== NSSL Phase 3 ==
In 2023, USSF released a draft RFP for "Phase 3" of NSSL, which covers the five fiscal years 2025–2029. Unlike the earlier NSSL contracts, Phase 3 is divided into two "lanes". Lane 1 covers less demanding missions and is structured to encourage new launch providers. Lane 2 is more similar to Phase 2 and requires each provider to be able to handle all NSSL requirements. However, Lane 2 allows for up to three providers instead of just the two providers of Phase 2. Proposals were due December 15, 2023.

Phase 3 Lane 1 awardees were SpaceX, Blue Origin and ULA. The vehicles being: Falcon 9, New Glenn and Vulcan Centaur, respectively. In March 2025, they were joined by Rocket Lab and Stoke Space winning awards for Neutron and Nova respectively.

On April 4, 2025, it was announced that SpaceX, ULA, and Blue Origin won Phase 3 lane 2, winning about 28, 19, and 7 launches respectively.

USSF announced the mission assignments for Lane 2 in April 2025,. In October 2026, USSF announced that delays to the certification of Vulcan Centaur required six missions to be swapped, reassigning earlier missions to SpaceX in return for some later missions to be assigned to ULA.

== Missions ==
Name	Satellite	Launch Vehicle	Award		Date (UTC)
Name	Satellite	Launch Vehicle	Year	Phase	Date (UTC)
NROL-52	Quasar	Atlas V 421	2016	Buy 1	15 October 2017
GPS III-1	GPS III	Falcon 9	2016	1A	23 December 2018
NROL-71	KH-11	Delta IV Heavy	2016	Buy 1	19 January 2019
WGS-10	WGS	Delta IV M+	2016		16 March 2019
AEHF-5	AEHF	Atlas V 551	2016		8 August 2019
GPS III-2	GPS III	Delta IV M+	2016		22 August 2019
AEHF-6	AEHF	Atlas V 551	2019	1	26 March 2020
USSF-7	X-37B OTV-6	Atlas V 501	2019	1	17 May 2020
GPS III-3	GPS III	Falcon 9	2017	1A	30 June 2020
GPS III-4	GPS III	Falcon 9	2018	1A	5 November 2020
NROL-101		Atlas V 531	2019	1	13 November 2020
NROL-44	Orion-10	Delta IV Heavy	2019	1	11 December 2020
NROL-82	KH-11	Delta IV Heavy	2019	1	26 April 2021
SBIRS GEO-5	SBIRS	Atlas V 421	2019	1A	18 May 2021
GPS III-5	GPS III	Falcon 9	2018	1A	17 June 2021
USSF-8	GSSAP-5 & GSSAP-6	Atlas V 511	2018	1A	21 January 2022
NROL-87		Falcon 9	2019	1A	2 February 2022
NROL-85	Intruder F/O-1	Falcon 9	2019	1A	17 April 2022
USSF-12	WFOV-T; USSF-12 Ring	Atlas V 541	2018	1A	1 July 2022
SBIRS GEO-6	SBIRS	Atlas V 421	2019	1A	4 August 2022
NROL-91	KH-11	Delta IV Heavy	2019	1	24 September 2022
USSF-44	Shepherd Demonstration & LDPE-2	Falcon Heavy	2019	1A	1 November 2022
USSF-67	CBAS-2 & LDPE-3A	Falcon Heavy	2020	2	15 January 2023
GPS III-6	GPS III	Falcon 9	2018	1A	18 January 2023
NROL-68	Orion 11	Delta IV Heavy	2019	1	22 June 2023
NROL-107	Silentbarker 1 × 3	Atlas V 551	2019	1A	10 September 2023
USSF-52	X-37B OTV-7	Falcon Heavy	2018	1A	29 December 2023
USSF-124	HBTSS × 2 Tranche-0	Falcon 9	2022	2	14 February 2024
NROL-123		Electron	2024		21 March 2024
NROL-70	Orion 12	Delta IV Heavy	2019	1	9 April 2024
USSF-62	WSF-M1	Falcon 9	2022	2	11 April 2024
USSF-51		Atlas V 551	2020	2	30 July 2024
GPS III-7	GPS III/RRT-1	Falcon 9	2023	2	17 December 2024
NROL-69	Intruder F/0-2	Falcon 9	2021	2	24 March 2025
NROL-174		Minotaur IV	2024		16 April 2025
GPS III-8	GPS III	Falcon 9	2022	2	30 May 2025
USSF-106	NTS-3; USA-554	Vulcan VC4S	2020	2	13 August 2025
USSF-36	X-37B OTV-8	Falcon 9	2021	2	22 August 2025
SDA T1TL-B	Tranche-1	Falcon 9	2023	2	10 September 2025
SDA T1TL-C	Tranche-1	Falcon 9	2023	2	15 October 2025
NROL-77		Falcon 9	2023	2	9 December 2025
GPS III-9	GPS III	Falcon 9	2023	2	28 January 2026
USSF-87	GSSAP-7 & 8	Vulcan VC4S	2021	2	12 February 2026
GPS III-10	GPS III	Falcon 9	2023	2	21 April 2026
SDA T1TL-E	Tranche-1	Falcon 9	2023	2	16 July 2026
NROL-97		Falcon Heavy	2025	3	1 October 2026
SDA T1TL-A	Tranche-1	Falcon 9	2022	2	10 October 2026
SDA T1TL-D	Tranche-1	Falcon 9	2023	2	2026
SDA T1TL-F	Tranche-1	Falcon 9	2023	2	2026
SDA T1TR-A	Tranche-1	Falcon 9	2023	2	2026
SDA T1TR-C	Tranche-1	Falcon 9	2023	2	2026
SDA T1TR-E	Tranche-1	Falcon 9	2023	2	2026
USSF-31		Falcon 9	2023	2	2026
NROL-86		Falcon Heavy	2025	3	2027
NROL-96		Falcon 9	2025	3	2027
NROL-157		Falcon 9	2025	3	2027
SDA T2TL-A	Tranche-2	Falcon 9	2023	2	2027
SDA T2TL-C	Tranche-2	Falcon 9	2023	2	2027
SDA T2TL-D	Tranche-2	Falcon 9	2024	3	2027
SDA T2TL-E	Tranche-2	Falcon 9	2024	3	2027
SDA T2TL-F	Tranche-2	Falcon 9	2024	3	2027
SDA T2TL-G	Tranche-2	Falcon 9	2024	3	2027
SDA T2TL-H	Tranche-2	Falcon 9	2024	3	2027
SDA T2TL-I	Tranche-2	Falcon 9	2024	3	2027
SDA T2TL-J	Tranche-2	Falcon 9	2024	3	2027
USSF-63		Falcon Heavy	2025	3	2027
USSF-75		Falcon Heavy	2023	2	2027
USSF-149		Falcon 9	2025	3	2027
USSF-155		Falcon Heavy	2025	3	2027
USSF-174		Falcon Heavy	2025	3	2027
USSF-186		Falcon Heavy	2025	3	2027
USSF-206	WGS-12	Falcon Heavy	2025	3	2027
USSF-234		Falcon 9	2025	3	2027
NROL-56		Vulcan Centaur	2023	2	2027
NROL-64		Vulcan VC4	2023	2	2027
NROL-73		Vulcan Centaur	2023	2	2027
NROL-83		Vulcan Centaur	2023	2	2027
NROL-88		Vulcan Centaur	2025	3	2027
NROL-100		Vulcan Centaur	2023	2	2027
NROL-109		Vulcan Centaur	2023	2	2027
NROL-118	Silentbarker 2 × 3	Vulcan Centaur	2023	2	2027
SDA T1TR-B	Tranche-1	Vulcan VC2S	2023	2	2027
SDA T1TR-D	Tranche-1	Vulcan VC2S	2023	2	2027
SDA T2TL-B	Tranche-2	Vulcan VC2S	2023	2	2027
STP-5	SIRI-3 & PUMA	Vulcan Centaur	2023	2	2027
USSF-16		Vulcan Centaur	2022	2	2027
USSF-23		Vulcan Centaur	2022	2	2027
USSF-43	LDPE-4; TBA	Vulcan Centaur	2022	2	2027
USSF-50	NG-OPIR-GEO II	Vulcan Centaur	2025	3	2027
USSF-57	NG-OPIR-GEO I	Vulcan Centaur	2023	2	2027
USSF-95	MTC Epoch-1 1	Vulcan Centaur	2023	2	2027
USSF-112		Vulcan VC4S	2021	2	2027
USSF-114		Vulcan Centaur	2023	2	2027
WGS-11+ (PTS-P1)	WGS	Vulcan VC2L	2022	2	2027
GPS IIIF-1	GPS IIIF	Vulcan Centaur	2023	2	2028
USSF-70	LDPE-5 (GAS-T) & Tetra-6	Vulcan Centaur	2023	2	2028
USSF-49	GPS IIIF-2	Vulcan Centaur	2025	3	2029
USSF-15	GPS IIIF-3	Vulcan Centaur	2025	3	2030
USSF-88	GPS IIIF-4	Vulcan Centaur	2025	3	2030
