= GX (rocket) =

Japanese-American launch vehicle

Galaxy Express (GX)
- GX (Shown with Atlas III first stage as in early development)
- Function: Medium expendable Launch vehicle
- Manufacturer: Galaxy Express (JAXA/ULA/IHI)
- Country of origin: Japan/United States

Size
- Height: 48 m (157 ft)
- Diameter: 3.3 m (11 ft)
- Mass: 190,500 kg (420,000 lb)
- Stages: 2

Capacity

Payload to LEO
- Mass: 3,600 kg (7,900 lb)

Payload to 800km SSO
- Mass: 1,814 kg (3,999 lb)

Launch history
- Status: Cancelled 2010
- Launch sites: Vandenberg SLC-3E

First stage – Atlas CCB
- Powered by: 1 RD-180
- Maximum thrust: 4,152 kN (933,000 lb_{f})
- Specific impulse: 311 seconds (3.05 km/s)
- Burn time: 253 seconds
- Propellant: RP-1/LOX

Second stage – GX
- Powered by: 1 LE-8
- Maximum thrust: 118 kN (27,000 lb_{f})
- Specific impulse: 323 seconds (3.17 km/s)
- Burn time: 480 seconds
- Propellant: LNG/LOX

GX was a design for an expendable launch system intended to compete in the commercial satellite launch sector. The system had developed by Galaxy Express Corporation, a joint venture between IHI Corporation (IHI), the Japan Aerospace Exploration Agency (JAXA), United Launch Alliance (ULA), Lockheed Martin Corporation (LM) and several other Japanese companies.

The GX design uses a two-stage rocket. The first stage would have been the Atlas Common Core Booster, currently used as the first stage of the Atlas V rocket, which would have been provided by United Launch Alliance. The second stage was to be a newly designed stage produced by IHI, using liquefied natural gas as fuel and liquid oxygen as an oxidizer. The GX would have been the only space vehicle to use that combination of fuel and oxidizer.

The Japanese government finally abandoned the GX program in December 2009. Galaxy Express disbanded around March 2010.

== History ==
The GX program began as an effort to upgrade Japan's J-I rocket, which launched only once. Thus, GX was originally known as J-II, albeit briefly. For a time, the program was termed J1-Upgrade, before finally settling on the current name in January 2003.

JAXA reported that a full-scale second-stage engine had been successfully test-fired in October 2007. JAXA was developing this engine, the responsibility for which was planned to eventually be turned over to the Galaxy Express venture.

In late December 2007, The Yomiuri Shimbun newspaper reported that the GX program was being subjected to a thorough review, mainly because of unexpectedly high additional costs. It also erroneously claimed that ULA partner Lockheed Martin had discontinued production of the first stage engine, thereby requiring a redesign, likely costly, to move to another engine. The paper said that the 15 billion yen that JAXA requested for the GX project was eventually slashed to 5.6 billion yen in the Fiscal 2008 budget.

It was originally designed to use an Atlas III first stage, and to be launched from Tanegashima in Japan, however this was abandoned in 2009 in favour of the CCB configuration.

In May 2008, it was reported that the Space Development Committee, who are overseeing the project, were considering its cancellation. In November 2009, the Japanese Government Administration Reform Committee recommended that funding for the second-stage engine be halted.

In December 2009, Japanese government decided to cancel the GX project. Development of the LNG propulsion system will continue for other projects.

In January 2010, IHI determined to disband Galaxy Express. The dissolution resulted in a one-off accounting loss of 11.3 billion yen.

== Galaxy Express Corporation ==
Galaxy Express Corporation (株式会社ギャラクシーエクスプレス, Kabushikigaisha Gyarakushīekusupuresu) (GALEX) was a Japanese company which intended to develop the GX rocket. GALEX was established on 27 March 2001. GALEX disbanded around March 2010.

=== Shareholders ===
As of November 2009, the shareholders of the company were:

- IHI Corporation (IHI)
- IHI Aerospace Co., Ltd. (IA)
- Mitsubishi Corporation (MC)
- Kawasaki Heavy Industries, Ltd. (KHI)
- Japan Aviation Electronics Industry, Limited (JAE)
- Fuji Heavy Industries Ltd. (FHI)
- Kokusai AeroMarine Co., Ltd. (KAM)
- NEC Corporation (NEC)
- Lockheed Martin Overseas Corporation (LMOC)
