= RD-180 =

Russian rocket engine

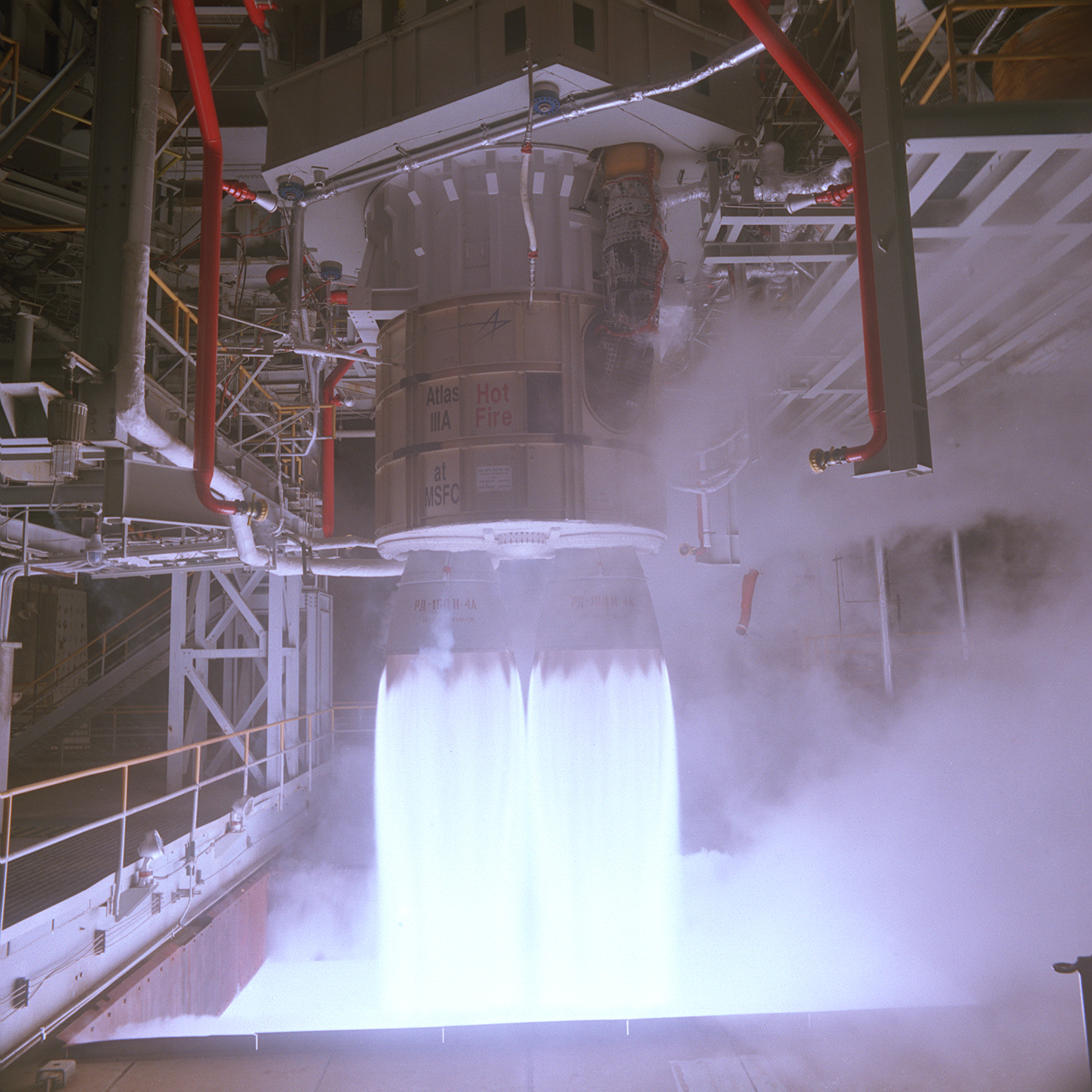
- RD-180 test firing at Marshall Space Flight Center
- Country of origin: Russia
- First flight: 24 May 2000
- Designer: NPO Energomash
- Manufacturer: NPO Energomash
- Application: Booster
- Predecessor: RD-170
- Status: Active

Liquid-fuel engine
- Propellant: LOX / RP-1
- Mixture ratio: 2.72 (73% O_{2}, 27% RP-1)
- Cycle: Staged combustion

Configuration
- Chamber: 2
- Nozzle ratio: 36.87

Performance
- Thrust, vacuum: 4,150 kN (930,000 lb_{f})
- Thrust, sea-level: 3,830 kN (860,000 lb_{f})
- Throttle range: 47–100%
- Thrust-to-weight ratio: 78.44
- Chamber pressure: 26.7 MPa (3,870 psi)
- Specific impulse, vacuum: 338 s (3.31 km/s)
- Specific impulse, sea-level: 311 s (3.05 km/s)
- Mass flow: 1,250 kg/s (165,000 lb/min)
- Burn time: 270 seconds

Dimensions
- Length: 3.56 m (11.7 ft)
- Diameter: 3.15 m (10.3 ft)
- Dry mass: 5,480 kg (12,080 lb)

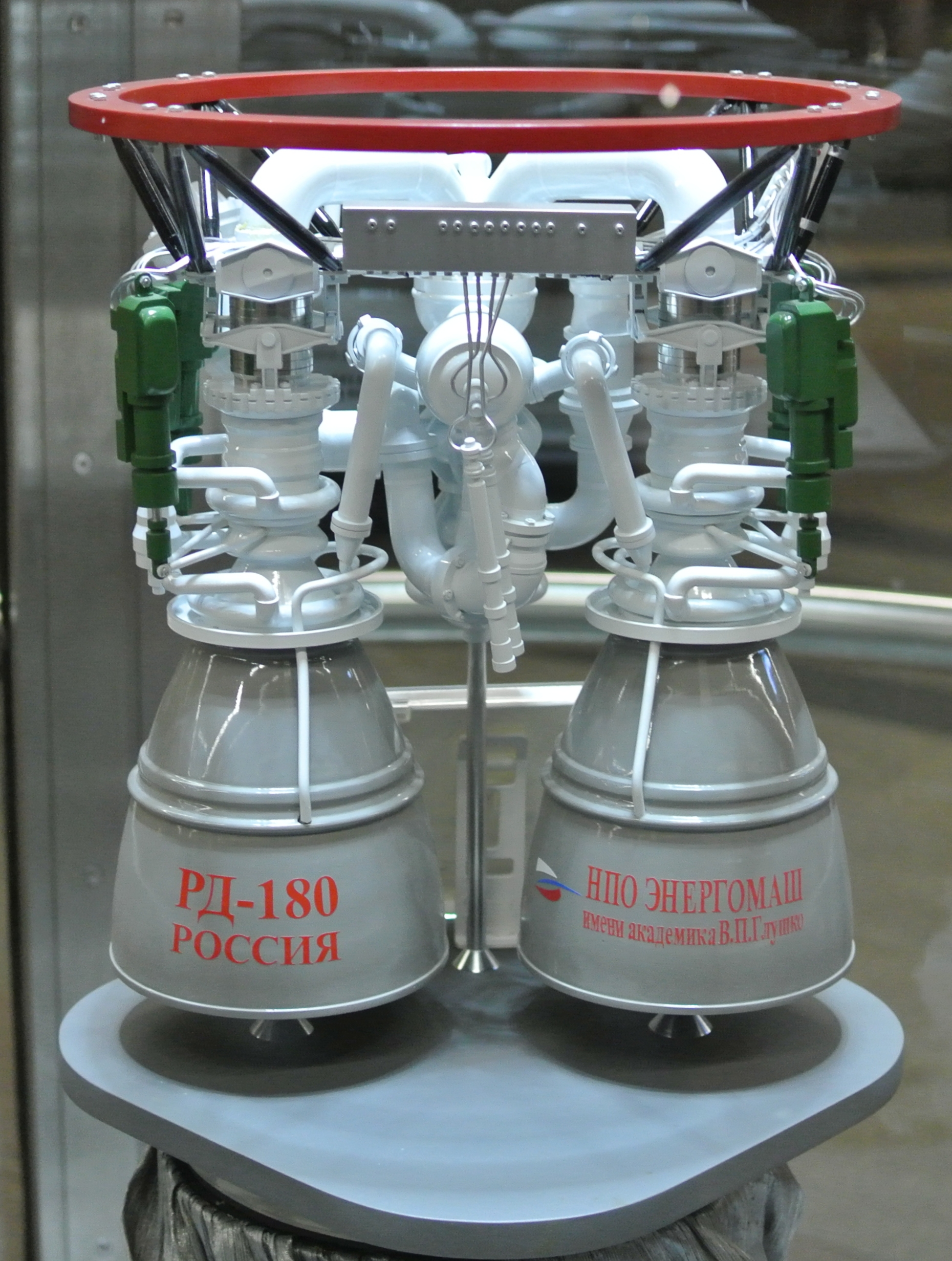
A model of the RD-180

The RD-180 (Russian: Ракетный Двигатель-180 (РД-180), romanized: Raketnyy Dvigatel-180, lit. 'Rocket Engine-180') is a rocket engine that was designed and built in Russia. It features a dual combustion chamber, dual-nozzle design and is fueled by a RP-1/LOX mixture. The RD-180 is derived from the RD-170 line of rocket engines, which were used in the Soviet Energia launch vehicle. The engine was developed for use on the US Atlas III and Atlas V launch vehicles and first flew in 2000. It was never used on any other rocket. The engine has flown successfully on all six Atlas III flights and on 110 Atlas V flights, with just a single non-critical failure in March 2016.

Atlas V is being phased out due to the national security implications of reliance on the Russian-built engine, which became a concern after the Russian annexation of Crimea. In 2021, Atlas manufacturer United Launch Alliance announced that it was retiring the Atlas V and that it had already taken delivery of the RD-180 engines for the remaining rockets. As of June 2024, 16 launches remain. In 2022, Russian supplies and maintenance were discontinued as the result of trade sanctions imposed after the 2022 Russian invasion of Ukraine.

== Design and specifications ==
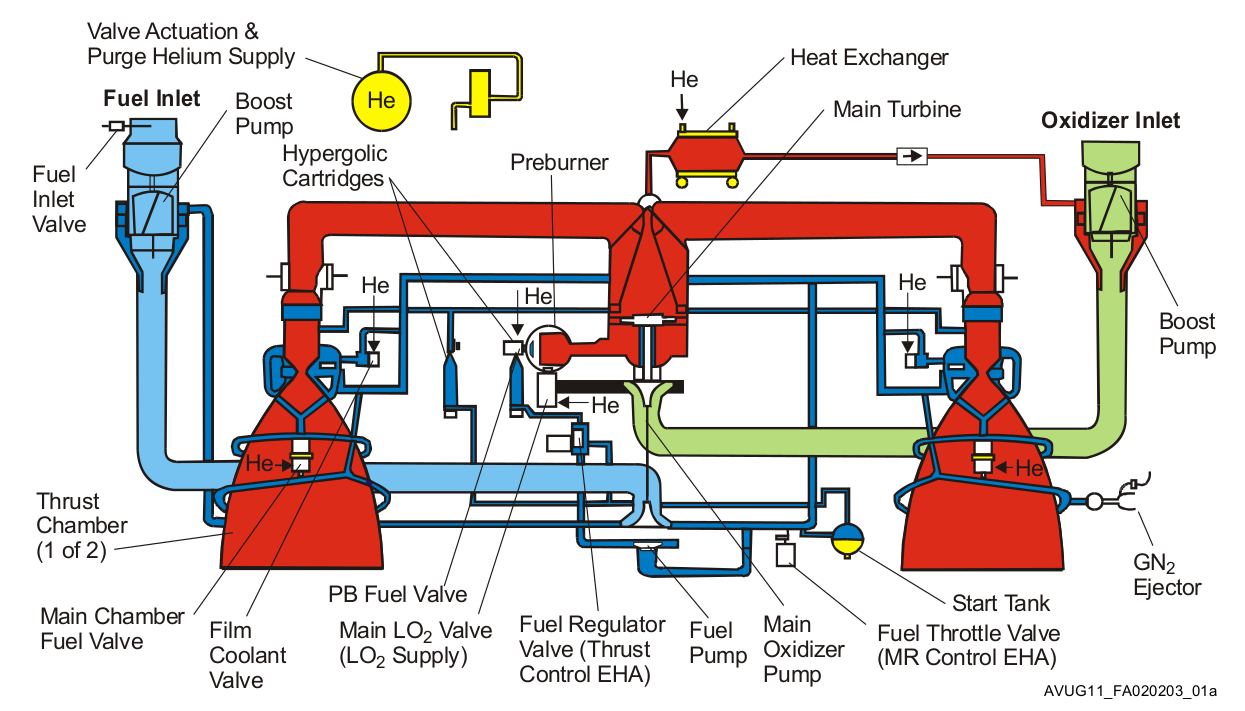
Schematic of the RD-180 engine: Helium; Low-pressure liquid oxygen; Low-pressure liquid fuel; High-pressure liquid fuel; High-pressure gaseous oxygen and preburner combustion products; EHA Electro-hydraulic actuator MR control EHA Mix-ratio control EHA PB fuel valve Pre-burner fuel valve

The combustion chambers of the RD-180 share a single turbopump unit, much like in its predecessor, the four-chambered RD-170. The RD-180 is fueled by an RP-1/LOX mixture and uses an extremely efficient, high-pressure staged combustion cycle. The engine runs with an oxidizer-to-fuel ratio of 2.72 and employs an oxygen-rich preburner, unlike typical fuel-rich US designs. The thermodynamics of the cycle allow an oxygen-rich preburner to give a greater power-to-weight ratio, but with the drawback that high-pressure, high-temperature gaseous oxygen must be transported throughout the engine. If the surfaces contacting this oxygen were bare metal, they would corrode too quickly. The RD-180 solves this problem using an inert enamel coating on all metal surfaces in contact with the hot oxygen. The movements of the engine nozzles are controlled by four hydraulic actuators. The engine can be throttled from 47% to 100% of nominal thrust.

== History ==
The roots of the RD-180 rocket engine extend to the Soviet Energia launch vehicle. The RD-170, a four-chamber engine, was developed for use in the strap-on boosters for this vehicle, which ultimately launched the Buran orbiter. This engine was scaled down to a two-chamber version by combining the RD-170's combustion devices with half-size turbomachinery. After successful performance on a test stand and high-level agreements between the US government and the Russian government, the engines were imported to the US for use on the Lockheed Martin Atlas III, which flew from 2000 to 2005. The engine has been used since 2002 on the United Launch Alliance Atlas V, the successor to the Atlas III. The engine has design features similar to the NK-33, which was developed by a different bureau (Kuznetzov) nearly a decade earlier. A modified NK-33 powered the original first stage of the Antares rocket.

=== 2014–2015 availability concerns ===
Doubts about the reliability of the supply chain for the RD-180 arose following the Russian military intervention in Ukraine in March 2014. For over 13 years since the engine was first used in the Atlas III launch vehicle in 2000, there was no serious jeopardy to the engine supply, despite an uneven record of US–Russian relations since the Cold War. However, worsening relations between the West and Russia after March 2014 led to several self-imposed blockages, including a short-lived judicial injunction from the US courts that was unclear whether the scope of the US sanctions covered importing the Russian engine.

On 13 May 2014, Russian Deputy Prime Minister Dmitry Rogozin announced that "Russia will ban the United States from using Russian-made rocket engines for military launches"—a frequent payload of the ULA Atlas V launch vehicle, which powers its first stage with a single RD-180 engine that is expended after each flight. In response, the US Air Force asked the Aerospace Corporation to evaluate alternatives for powering the Atlas 5 booster with non-RD-180 engines. Early estimates in 2014 were that it would require five or more years to replace the RD-180 on the Atlas V.

Even though the Russian government could cut off the supply to ULA of imported RD-180 engines, the US Congress, with emerging support from the Air Force, came to the view that it would not be advantageous to build a US production line for the RD-180, mainly because it would need a license from the Russian government. However, the US Congress in 2014 advocated a new US rocket engine program to field a new engine by 2022.

In June 2014, Aerojet Rocketdyne proposed that the federal government "fund an all-new, U.S.-sourced rocket propulsion system", the 2,200-kilonewton-class (500,000 lbf) thrust kerosene/LOX AR1 rocket engine. As of June 2014, Aerojet's projection was that the cost of each engine would be under US$25 million per pair of engines—not including the up to US$1 billion development cost to be funded by the US Government. Aerojet believed that the AR-1 could replace the RD-180 in the US Evolved Expendable Launch Vehicle fleet, and that it would be more affordable.

On 21 August 2014, the U.S. Air Force released an official request for information (RFI) for a replacement for the RD-180. The RFI seeks information on "booster propulsion and/or launch system material options that could deliver cost-effective, commercially-viable solutions for current and future National Security Space (NSS) launch requirements. Air Force Space Command (AFSPC) is considering an acquisition strategy to stimulate the commercial development of booster propulsion systems and/or launch systems for Evolved Expendable Launch Vehicle (EELV)-class spacelift applications." The day before, the United Launch Alliance had taken delivery of two RD-180s, the first since the Russian annexation of Crimea. It was not clear when or if the RD-180 would be replaced, and the RFI asked for several options including similarity to the Russian engine, whether it would come in a new configuration and the use of "alternative launch vehicles" for the EELV mission.

In 2014, RD-Amross were selling the RD-180s (to ULA) for $23.4m each. In January 2015, Orbital Sciences Corporation received all the necessary permissions from government bodies for the delivery of 60 engines from NPO Energomash. On 24 December 2015, United Launch Alliance announced that it had placed an order for more RD-180 engines to be used by the Atlas V launch vehicle, in addition to 29 engines that the company had ordered before US sanctions were imposed on Russia over Crimea, and just days after the US Congress lifted the ban on Russian engines for American rockets.

=== Planned US production of the RD-180 ===
There were several plans to manufacture the RD-180 in the US, but none of them came to fruition. Under RD AMROSS, Pratt & Whitney is licensed to produce the RD-180 in the United States. According to a 2005 GAO Assessment of Selected Major Weapon Programs, Pratt & Whitney planned to start building the RD-180 in the United States in 2008 with a first military launch by 2012, but this did not occur.

United Launch Alliance (ULA) announced in February 2015 that it was considering undertaking US production of the Russian RD-180 engine at the Decatur, Alabama, rocket stage manufacturing facility. The US-manufactured engines would be used only for government civil (NASA) and commercial launches, not for US military launches. This project was a backup plan to the new engine development work by ULA with Blue Origin on the BE-4. In 2014, the Defense Department estimated that it would require approximately $1 billion and five years to begin US domestic manufacture of the RD-180 engine.

Overall, by 14 April 2021, Energomash delivered 122 RD-180 rocket engines to the United States over more than 20 years. In an interview on 26 August 2021, ULA's CEO Tory Bruno said that three or four RD-180s were installed on Atlas V rockets for upcoming missions, and the rest were sitting in a warehouse. He said: "We took early delivery, if you will, with the RD-180, so I can end that relationship and not be dependent upon [Russia] because that’s what Congress asked us to do." The 122 RD-180 engines from Energomash generated billions in revenue for Russia's space program.

=== Replacement options for the RD-180 ===
Several options for replacing the RD-180 on Atlas V were investigated, but ULA ultimately decided to replace the rocket with Vulcan Centaur instead. In February 2010, despite the availability of necessary documentation and legal rights for producing RD-180 in the United States, NASA was considering development of an indigenous core-stage engine that would be "capable of generating high levels of thrust approximately equal to or exceeding the performance of the Russian-built engine". NASA desired to produce a fully operational engine by 2020 or sooner, depending on partnership with the U.S. Defense Department.

As a result of the geopolitical and US political considerations, United Launch Alliance considered a possible replacement for the Russian RD-180 engine used on the first-stage booster of the ULA Atlas V. Formal study contracts were issued in June 2014 to a number of US rocket-engine suppliers. In September 2014, ULA announced that it had entered into a partnership with Blue Origin to develop the BE-4 LOX/methane engine to replace the RD-180 on a new first-stage booster that would succeed the Atlas V. At the time, the engine was already in its third year of development by Blue Origin, and ULA expected the new stage and engine to start flying no earlier than 2019. Two of the 2,400-kilonewton (550,000 lbf)-thrust BE-4 engines would be used on the new launch vehicle booster.

Dynetics and Aerojet Rocketdyne (AJR) also offered their Aerojet Rocketdyne AR1 hydrocarbon-fueled rocket engine as replacement of the RD-180. ULA CEO Tory Bruno said in early 2015 that both the AR-1 option and the US manufacture of the RD-180 by ULA under license were backup options to the primary option ULA was pursuing with the Blue Origin BE-4 engine. By March 2016, the US Air Force had signed development contracts with AJR and Blue Origin to fund development for both engines. The first Vulcan flight with new engines occurred in January 2024. As of 25 May 2020 (20 years since the first launch of the Atlas LV with RD-180), all 90 launches so far were successful.

== Applications ==
During the early 1990s, General Dynamics Space Systems Division (later purchased by Lockheed Martin) acquired the rights to use the RD-180 in the Evolved Expendable Launch Vehicle (EELV) and the Atlas program. As these programs were conceived to support United States Government launches, as well as commercial launches, it was also arranged for the RD-180 to be co-produced by Pratt & Whitney. However, all production took place in Russia. The engine was sold by a joint venture between the Russian developer and producer of the engine NPO Energomash and Pratt & Whitney, called RD Amross. The RD-180 was first deployed on the Atlas IIA-R vehicle, which was the Atlas IIA vehicle with the Russian (hence the R) engine replacing the previous main engine. This vehicle was later renamed the Atlas III. An additional development program was undertaken to certify the engine for use on the modular Common Core Booster primary stage of the Atlas V rocket.

=== Prospective uses ===
RD-180 was proposed to be used, with a new family of Rus-M Russian space launch vehicles, proposed by Roskosmos contractors, but the program was canceled by the Russian Space Agency in October 2011. In March 2010, Jerry Grey, a consultant to the American Institute of Aeronautics and Astronautics and Universities Space Research Association and a former professor of aerospace engineering at Princeton University, suggested using the RD-180 for a prospective NASA heavy-lift launch vehicle. For those who might be concerned about too much reliance on Russia, he pointed out that RD Amross was "very close to producing a U.S.-built version of the RD-180, and with some infusion of NASA funding could be manufacturing that engine (and perhaps even a 1,700,000 lbf or 7.6 MN thrust equivalent of the RD-170) in a few years".

=== 2022 Russian invasion of Ukraine ===
On 24 February 2022, Russia began a large-scale military invasion of Ukraine. On 2 March, as Russia continued the invasion, they announced an end of all sales and support of the RD-180 engines to the United States in retaliation for sanctions placed on Russia by the US for the Ukraine attack.

== See also ==
- Comparison of orbital rocket engines
- Staged combustion cycle used in engine
- RD-0124 used in the Soyuz-2.1b
- RD-107 used in the R-7 Semyorka missiles and Soyuz FG
- RD-191 derivative engine being developed for the Angara rocket
- RD-58 upper stage RP-1/LOX engine used in the N-1 rocket, derivatives used in the Proton and Zenit rockets
