= Common Core Booster =

American rocket stage used as the first stage of the Atlas V Rocket

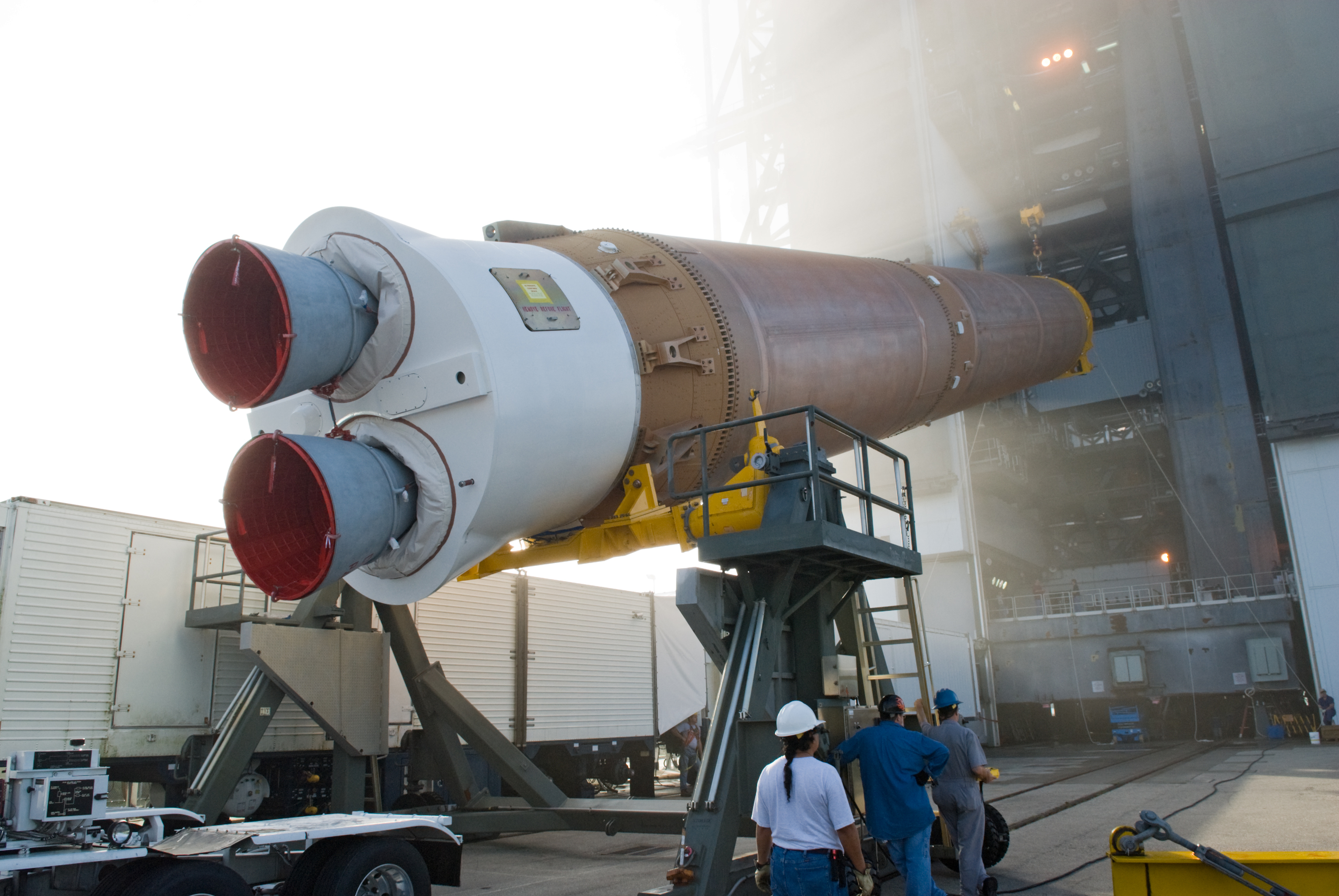
- The CCB of Atlas V AV-021 is erected at the Vertical Integration Facility of SLC-41 ahead of the launch of the Solar Dynamics Observatory
- Manufacturer: Lockheed Martin (1998–2006); United Launch Alliance (2006–2024)
- Country of origin: United States
- Used on: Atlas V

General characteristics
- Height: 32.46 m (106.5 ft)
- Diameter: 3.81 m (12.5 ft)
- Propellant mass: 284,089 kg (626,309 lb)
- Empty mass: 21,054 kg (46,416 lb) (V 400 series); 21,351 kg (47,071 lb) (V 500 series)

Propulsion
- Powered by: 1× RD-180
- Maximum thrust: 3,827 kN (860,000 lb_{f}) (SL); 4,152 kN (933,000 lb_{f}) (vac)
- Burn time: 253 s
- Propellant: LOX/RP-1

The Common Core Booster (CCB) is a rocket stage, which is used as the first stage of the American Atlas V rocket as part of its modular design. It was also intended that two additional CCBs would be used as boosters on the Atlas V Heavy, however this configuration has not been developed. Use of a Common Core Booster as the first stage of the Japanese GX was also planned; however, this program was cancelled in late 2009.

The Common Core Booster is 32.46 m (106.5 ft) long, has a diameter of 3.81 m (12.5 ft) and is powered by a single RD-180 engine burning RP-1 and liquid oxygen. The CCB's fuel tanks are built out of isogrid aluminum.

Testing of the CCB and its RD-180 engines was conducted in the United States at the Marshall Space Flight Center, and in Khimki, Russia. The test programme concluded with the final engine test in December 2001. The first launch of a Common Core Booster was the maiden flight of the Atlas V, which was launched from Space Launch Complex 41 at the Cape Canaveral Air Force Station on 21 August 2002. As of November 2020, the Atlas V has made 86 flights, all of which have used a single Common Core Booster.

== See also ==
- Universal Rocket Module, the Russian Angara common core
- Falcon Heavy, the SpaceX Falcon 9 multi-core variant
- Delta IV Heavy, the Delta IV multi-core variant
