= Cryogenic rocket engine =

Type of rocket engine which uses liquid fuel stored at very low temperatures

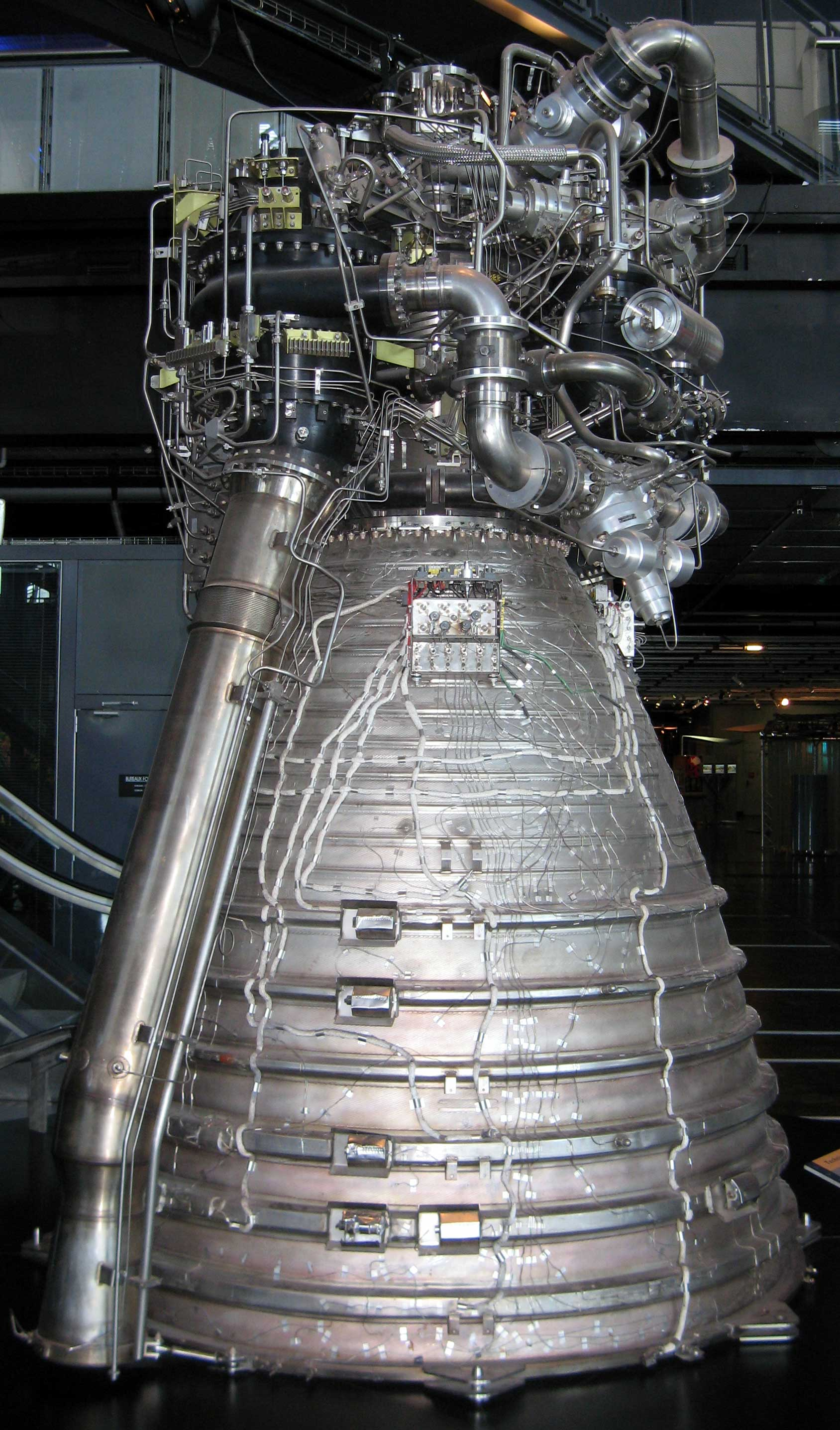
Vulcain engine of Ariane 5 rocket

A cryogenic rocket engine is a rocket engine that uses a cryogenic fuel and oxidizer; that is, both its fuel and oxidizer are gases which have been liquefied and are stored at very low temperatures. These highly efficient engines were first flown on the US Atlas-Centaur and were one of the main factors of NASA's success in reaching the Moon by the Saturn V rocket.

Rocket engines burning cryogenic propellants remain in use today on high performance upper stages and boosters. Upper stages are numerous. Boosters include ESA's Ariane 6, ISRO's GSLV, LVM3, JAXA's H-II, NASA's Space Launch System. The United States, Russia, India, Japan, France and China are the only countries that have operational cryogenic rocket engines.

== Cryogenic propellants ==
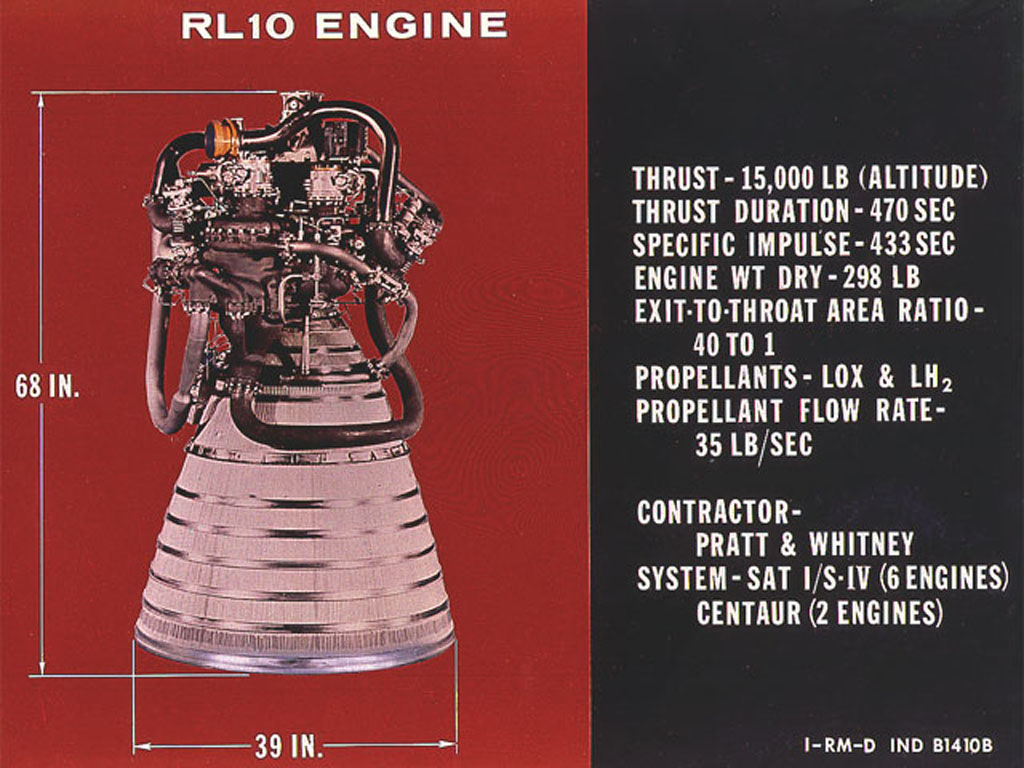
RL10 is an early example of cryogenic rocket engine.

Rocket engines need high mass flow rates of both oxidizer and fuel to generate useful thrust. Oxygen, the simplest and most common oxidizer, is in the gas phase at standard temperature and pressure, as is hydrogen, the simplest fuel. While it is possible to store propellants as pressurized gases, this would require large, heavy tanks that would make achieving orbital spaceflight difficult if not impossible. On the other hand, if the propellants are cooled sufficiently, they exist in the liquid phase at higher density and lower pressure, simplifying tankage. These cryogenic temperatures vary depending on the propellant, with liquid oxygen existing below −183 °C (−297.4 °F; 90.1 K) and liquid hydrogen below −253 °C (−423.4 °F; 20.1 K). Since one or more of the propellants is in the liquid phase, all cryogenic rocket engines are by definition liquid-propellant rocket engines.

Various cryogenic fuel-oxidizer combinations have been tried, but the combination of liquid hydrogen (LH2) fuel and the liquid oxygen (LOX) oxidizer is one of the most widely used. Both components are easily and cheaply available, and when burned have one of the highest enthalpy releases in combustion, producing a specific impulse of up to 450 s at an effective exhaust velocity of 4.4 kilometres per second (2.7 mi/s; Mach 13).

== Components and combustion cycles ==
The major components of a cryogenic rocket engine are the combustion chamber, pyrotechnic initiator, fuel injector, fuel and oxidizer turbopumps, cryo valves, regulators, the fuel tanks, and rocket engine nozzle. In terms of feeding propellants to the combustion chamber, cryogenic rocket engines are almost exclusively pump-fed. Pump-fed engines work in a gas-generator cycle, a staged-combustion cycle, or an expander cycle. Gas-generator engines tend to be used on booster engines due to their lower efficiency, staged-combustion engines can fill both roles at the cost of greater complexity, and expander engines are exclusively used on upper stages due to their low thrust.

== LOX+LH2 rocket engines by country ==
Currently, six countries have successfully developed and deployed cryogenic rocket engines:

Country	Engine	Cycle	Use	Status
United States	RL10	Expander	Upper stage	Active
United States	J-2	Gas-generator	lower stage	Retired
United States	SSME (aka RS-25)	Staged combustion	Booster	Active
United States	RS-68	Gas-generator	Booster	Retired
United States	BE-3	Combustion tap-off	New Shepard	Active
United States	BE-7	Dual Expander	Blue Moon (spacecraft)	Active
United States	J-2X	Gas-generator	Upper stage	Developmental
Russia	RD-0120	Staged combustion	Booster	Retired
Russia	KVD-1	Staged combustion	Upper stage	Retired
Russia	RD-0146	Expander	Upper stage	Developmental
France	Vulcain	Gas-generator	Booster	Active
France	HM7B	Gas-generator	Upper stage	Retired
France	Vinci	Expander	Upper stage	Active
India	CE-7.5	Staged combustion	Upper stage	Active
India	CE-20	Gas-generator	Upper stage	Active
China	YF-73	Gas-generator	Upper stage	Retired
China	YF-75	Gas-generator	Upper stage	Active
China	YF-75D	Expander cycle	Upper stage	Active
China	YF-77	Gas-generator	Booster	Active
Japan	LE-7 / 7A	Staged combustion	Booster	Active
Japan	LE-5 / 5A / 5B	Gas-generator(LE-5); Expander bleed(5A/5B)	Upper stage	Active
Japan	LE-9	Expander bleed	Booster	Active

== Comparison of first stage cryogenic rocket engines ==
model	SSME/RS-25	LE-7A	RD-0120	Vulcain 2	RS-68	YF-77
Country of origin	United States	Japan	Soviet Union	France	United States	China
Cycle	Staged combustion	Staged combustion	Staged combustion	Gas-generator	Gas-generator	Gas-generator
Length	4.24 m	3.7 m	4.55 m	3.00 m	5.20 m	2.6 m
Diameter	1.63 m	1.82 m	2.42 m	1.76 m	2.43 m	1.5 m
Dry weight	3,177 kg	1,832 kg	3,449 kg	1,686 kg	6,696 kg	1,054 kg
Propellant	LOX/LH2	LOX/LH2	LOX/LH2	LOX/LH2	LOX/LH2	LOX/LH2
Chamber pressure	18.9 MPa	12.0MPa	21.8 MPa	11.7 MPa	9.7 MPa	10.1 MPa
Isp (vac.)	453 sec	440 sec	454 sec	433 sec	409 sec	428 sec
Thrust (vac.)	2.278MN	1.098MN	1.961MN	1.120MN	3.37MN	0.7MN
Thrust (SL)	1.817MN	0.87MN	1.517MN	0.800MN	2.949MN	0.518MN
Used in	Space Shuttle; Space Launch System	H-IIA; H-IIB	Energia	Ariane 5	Delta IV	Long March 5

== Comparison of upper stage cryogenic rocket engines ==
Specifications
	RL10	HM7B	Vinci	KVD-1	CE-7.5	CE-20	YF-73	YF-75	YF-75D	RD-0146	ES-702	ES-1001	LE-5	LE-5A	LE-5B
Country of origin	United States	France	France	Soviet Union	India	India	China	China	China	Russia	Japan	Japan	Japan	Japan	Japan
Cycle	Expander	Gas-generator	Expander	Staged combustion	Staged combustion	Gas-generator	Gas-generator	Gas-generator	Expander	Expander	Gas-generator	Gas-generator	Gas-generator	Expander bleed cycle （Nozzle Expander）	Expander bleed cycle （Chamber Expander）
Thrust (vac.)	66.7 kN (15,000 lbf)	62.7 kN	180 kN	69.6 kN	73 kN	186.36 kN	44.15 kN	83.585 kN	88.36 kN	98.1 kN (22,054 lbf)	68.6 kN (7.0 tf)	98 kN (10.0 tf)	102.9 kN (10.5 tf)	r121.5 kN (12.4 tf)	137.2 kN (14 tf)
Mixture ratio	5.5:1 or 5.88:1	5.0	5.8			5.05	5.0	5.2	6.0		5.2	6.0	5.5	5	5
Nozzle ratio	40	83.1				100	40	80	80		40	40	140	130	110
I_{sp} (vac.)	433	444.2	465	462	454	442	420	438	442.6	463	425	425	450	452	447
Chamber pressure :MPa	2.35	3.5	6.1	5.6	5.8	6.0	2.59	3.68	4.1	5.9	2.45	3.51	3.65	3.98	3.58
LH_{2} TP rpm			90,000					42,000	65,000	125,000	41,000	46,310	50,000	51,000	52,000
LOX TP rpm			18,000								16,680	21,080	16,000	17,000	18,000
Length m	1.73	1.8	2.2~4.2	2.14	2.14		1.44	2.8		2.2			2.68	2.69	2.79
Dry weight kg	135	165	550	282	435	558	236	245	265	242	255.8	259.4	255	248	285
