= YF-79 =

Chinese rocket engine

- Country of origin: China
- Designer: Beijing Aerospace Propulsion Institute
- Associated LV: Long March 9
- Predecessor: YF-75D
- Status: In development

Liquid-fuel engine
- Propellant: Liquid oxygen / Liquid hydrogen
- Mixture ratio: 6.0
- Cycle: Closed Expander Cycle

Configuration
- Chamber: 1
- Nozzle ratio: 160

Performance
- Thrust, vacuum: 250 kilonewtons (56,000 lb_{f})
- Chamber pressure: 7.0 MPa (1,020 psi)
- Specific impulse, vacuum: 455.2 seconds (4.464 km/s)

Used in
- Long March 9

The YF-79 is a liquid cryogenic rocket engine burning liquid hydrogen and liquid oxygen in a closed expander cycle. It is China's fourth generation of upper stage cryogenic propellant engine, after the YF-73, YF-75 and the YF-75D. It can do multiple restarts thanks to an electric spark igniter and a prototype was tested at 60% and 100% (25 tonnes-force (250 kN; 25 LTf; 28 STf)) thrust levels in December 2021.

It will be used on the third stage of the Long March 9.
