= Vinci (rocket engine) =

European rocket engine for upper stages

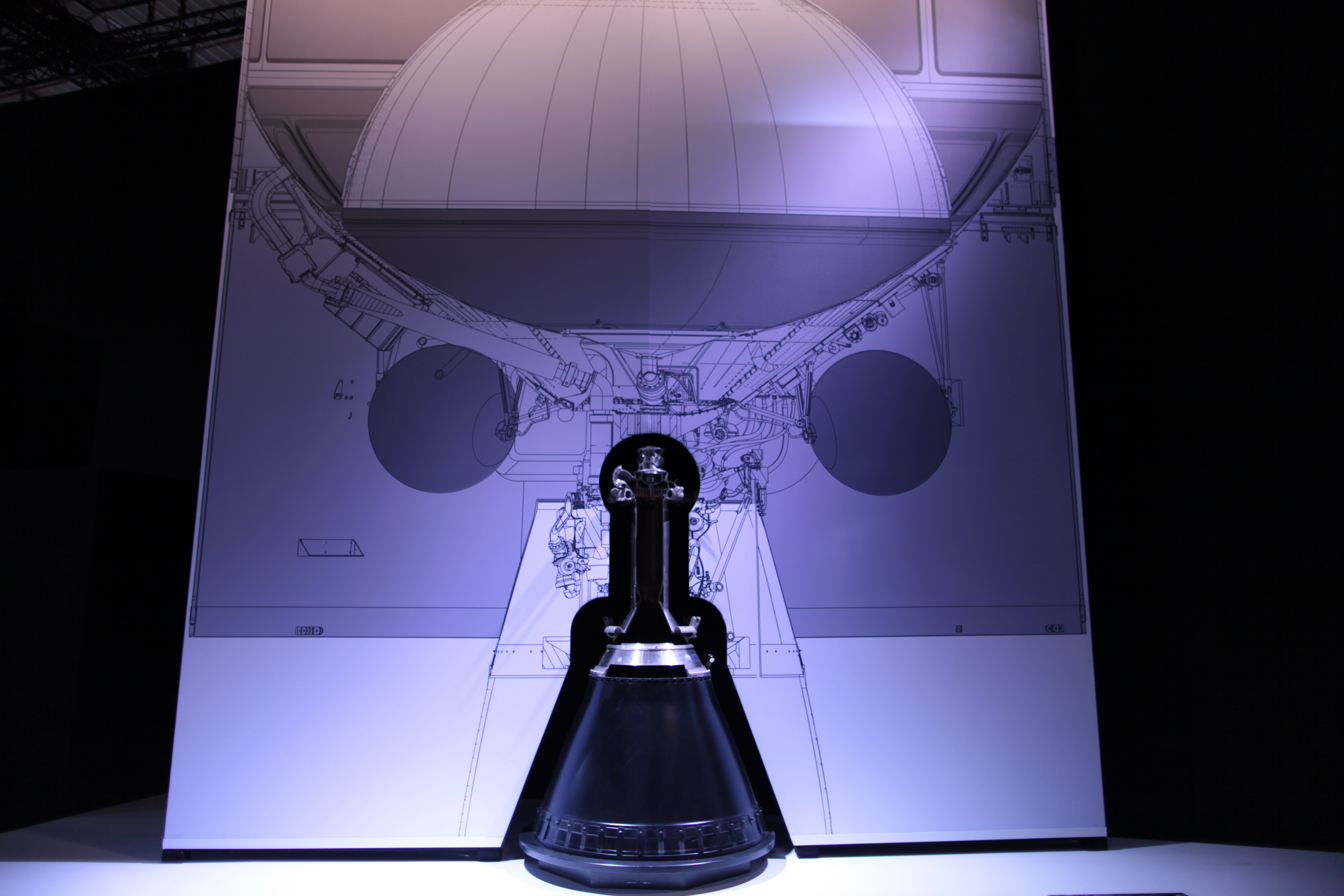
- Prototype Vinci engine on display
- Country of origin: France
- First flight: 9 July 2024
- Designer: Safran Aircraft Engines (and later ArianeGroup)
- Manufacturer: ArianeGroup
- Application: Ariane 6 upper stage
- Predecessor: Aestus; HM7B
- Status: Active

Liquid-fuel engine
- Propellant: LOX / LH_{2}
- Mixture ratio: 6.1
- Cycle: Expander

Configuration
- Chamber: 1
- Nozzle ratio: 240

Performance
- Thrust, vacuum: 180 kN (40,000 lb_{f})
- Chamber pressure: 60 bar (6,000 kPa)
- Specific impulse, vacuum: 457.2 s (4.484 km/s)
- Burn time: Up to 900 seconds
- Restarts: Up to 3

Dimensions
- Length: 3.22 m (10.6 ft)
- Diameter: 1.84 m (6 ft 0 in)
- Dry mass: approx. 550 kg (1,210 lb); 160 kg (350 lb), excluding nozzle

Vinci is a restartable, cryogenic, liquid-propellant rocket engine that powers the upper stage of Ariane 6. While development began in 1998 for the planned Ariane 5ME upgrade, funding for that programme shifted in 2014 to prioritize the development of Ariane 6, making Vinci the engine for the new launcher.

== Overview ==
The Vinci rocket engine is a 180-kilonewton (40,000 lb_{f}) restartable, upper stage cryogenic engine using the expander cycle and fed with liquid hydrogen and liquid oxygen. Its biggest improvement over the HM7B engine used on the Ariane 5 is the capability of restarting four times. It is the first European expander cycle engine, removing the need for a gas generator to drive the fuel and oxidizer pumps. The expander cycle was found to be the most promising option to achieve higher reliability, higher performance, multiple ignition capability and low recurring cost.

The engine features a high-performance hydrogen turbopump, an optimized combustion chamber cooling circuit, and cutting-edge manufacturing processes, including powder metallurgy impellers and high-speed cooling channel milling. The combustion chamber body incorporates a smooth-wall design, utilizing the same technology as the HM7B and Vulcain engines, except significantly lengthened.

To enable re-ignition, the Vinci engine is paired with an auxiliary propulsion unit (APU), which performs two important functions. First, the APU can heat up small amounts of propellant inside a 3D-printed gas generator and inject it back into the tanks to re-pressurize them. Secondly, the APU can produce a low level of thrust, to either settle floating propellant in the tanks before re-ignition of the Vinci engine or to make fine orbital adjustments (similar to a thruster). Using the APU reduces overall weight, by eliminating the need to carry a helium tank (the traditional method of re-pressuring propellant tanks).

== Development ==
The preliminary design of Vinci began under the Ariane 5+ program managed by CNES, delegated by ESA. Between 2006 and 2008, engineering and testing were conducted under ESA's Future Launchers Preparatory Programme (FLPP). From 2009 to 2014, Vinci was developed as the upper-stage propulsion system for the next evolution of the upgraded Ariane 5ME (Midlife Evolution) launcher by the space engines division of Safran Aircraft Engines. However, funding for the Ariane 5ME programme was cut in 2014 in favour of developing Ariane 6.

By the end of 2014, Vinci successfully completed its critical design review (CDR), following successful CDRs for its major subsystems (combustion chamber, fuel and oxygen turbopumps) throughout the latter half of the year.

In July 2017, the newly-formed Ariane Group, a joint venture between Airbus and Safran, reported that the first flight models of the combustion chamber had entered production.

In October 2018, Ariane Group announced that qualification tests had been completed, proving the engine and upper stage were capable of operating for at least 900 seconds and four burns. The company said that during tests to push the engine beyond its operational requirements, it had successfully fired the engine 20 times during a single test of 300 seconds and, in another test, had fired the engine for a total duration of 1,569 seconds.

The first flight of the Ariane 6 rocket with Vinci took place on 9 July 2024. The engine worked normally during the initial launch and a brief second burn. However, it failed to restart for a third burn due to an anomaly with its auxiliary propulsion unit, precluding a deorbit burn.

== See also ==
- Spacecraft propulsion
- M10 (rocket engine)

=== Comparable engines ===
- RL10
- RL60
- HM7B
- YF-75D
- RD-0146
- LE-5B-2
- CE-20
