= YF-75 =

Chinese rocket engine

- Country of origin: China
- First flight: 1994-02-08
- Designer: Beijing Aerospace Propulsion Institute
- Manufacturer: China Academy of Launch Vehicle Technology (CALT)
- Associated LV: Long March 3A, Long March 3B and Long March 3C
- Predecessor: YF-73
- Successor: YF-75D
- Status: In service

Liquid-fuel engine
- Propellant: Liquid oxygen / Liquid hydrogen
- Mixture ratio: 5.1 (adjustable)
- Cycle: Gas-generator

Configuration
- Chamber: 1
- Nozzle ratio: 80

Performance
- Thrust, vacuum: 78.45 kilonewtons (17,640 lb_{f})
- Chamber pressure: 3.76 MPa (37.6 bar)
- Specific impulse, vacuum: 438 seconds (4.30 km/s)
- Burn time: 470 seconds (7.8 min)

Dimensions
- Length: 2.8 metres (9 ft 2 in)
- Diameter: 1.5 metres (4 ft 11 in)
- Dry mass: 550 kilograms (1,210 lb)

Used in
- Long March 3A, Long March 3B and Long March 3C H-18 third stage.

The YF-75 is a liquid cryogenic rocket engine burning liquid hydrogen and liquid oxygen in a gas generator cycle. It is China's second generation of cryogenic propellant engine, after the YF-73, which it replaced. It is used in a dual engine mount in the H-18 third stage of the Long March 3A, Long March 3B and Long March 3C launch vehicles. Within the mount, each engine can gimbal individually to enable thrust vectoring control. The engine also heats hydrogen and helium to pressurize the stage tanks and can control the mixture ratio to optimize propellant consumption.

== Development ==
Given the upward trend on geosynchronous communication satellite's mass and size, a program to develop an engine more powerful than the YF-73 was started by 1982. The proper development of the engine started in 1986 and leveraged the experience of the YF-73. It flew for the first time in 1994. By September 2013, it had accumulated 12 start up and 3,000 seconds of firing time without malfunction.

By 2006 and with the project for the Long March 5 family a serious redesign program was started. The resulting engine, the YF-75D is a different engine, using a closed circuit expander cycle like the RL10.

== Technical Description ==
The combustion chamber regeneratively cooled and is made of a zirconium copper alloy. It is manufactured by forging, rolled into shape, and then the cooling channels are milled. The outer wall is electroformed nickel. The nozzle extension uses dump cooling. It is made by welding spiraling tubes which pass cryogenic hydrogen that is dumped since the tubes are open at the bottom. The gas generator feed separate turbopumps for fuel and oxidizer. The single shaft hydrogen turbopump operates at 42,000rpm and uses dual elastic supports to enhance the rotor stability and reliability. The gas generator also incorporates dual heat exchanger that heat hydrogen gas and helium supplied from separate system to pressurize the hydrogen and oxygen tanks.

The turbopumps use solid propellant cartridge for start up, while the gas generator and combustion chamber use pyrotechnic igniter. It can restart for two burn profile missions. All subsystems are attached to the combustion chamber and gimbal is achieved by rotating the whole engine on two orthogonal planes with two independent actuators. These actuators use high pressure hydrogen as hydraulic fluid. The oxygen supply system has a propellant utilization valve before the main LOX valve to regulate its flow and thus variate the mixture ratio. This enables optimization of the propellant reserves and improves performance.
