= PCAD =

PCAD may refer to:

- Pacific Coast Architecture Database managed by the University of Washington
- Pennsylvania College of Art and Design, a college in Lancaster, Pennsylvania, United States of America
- Plymouth College of Art, a college in Plymouth, England
- P-CAD (Personal CAD Systems, Inc.), a US company founded in 1982
- Propulsion Cryogenics & Advanced Development (PCAD) rocket engine development project of NASA (2005-2010)
