= LE-9 =

Japanese hydrolox expander rocket engine

- Country of origin: Japan
- Designer: JAXA
- Manufacturer: Mitsubishi Heavy Industries
- Application: First-stage engine
- Associated LV: H3
- Predecessor: LE-7A
- Status: In production

Liquid-fuel engine
- Propellant: LOX / LH_{2}
- Mixture ratio: 5.9
- Cycle: Expander bleed cycle

Configuration
- Chamber: 1
- Nozzle ratio: 37:1

Performance
- Thrust, vacuum: 1,471 kN (331,000 lbf)
- Thrust-to-weight ratio: 62.50
- Chamber pressure: 10.0 MPa (1,450 psi)
- Specific impulse, vacuum: 426 s (4.18 km/s)

Dimensions
- Length: 3.8 m (12 ft)
- Dry mass: 2.4 t (5,300 lb)

Used in
- H3 core stage

The LE-9 is a liquid cryogenic rocket engine burning liquid hydrogen and liquid oxygen in an expander bleed cycle. Two or three will be used to power the core stage of the H3 launch vehicle.

The newly developed LE-9 engine is the most important factor in achieving cost reduction, improved safety and increased thrust. The expander bleed cycle used in the LE-9 engine is a highly reliable combustion method that Japan has put into practical use for the LE-5 upper stage engine. However, it is physically difficult for an expander bleed cycle engine to generate large thrust, so the development of the LE-9 engine with a thrust of 1,471 kN (331,000 lb_{f}) is the most challenging and important development element.

Firing tests of the LE-9 first-stage engine began in April 2017.

On 21 January 2022, the launch of the first H3 was rescheduled to FY 2022 or later, citing technical problems regarding the first stage LE-9 engine.

The LE-9 was operated successfully for the first time, on March 7, 2023. The second stage of that rocket, did not ignite and the mission was a failure. On February 17, 2024, the second launch of H3 was successful and LE-9 operations were successful for the second consecutive time.

== See also ==
- H3 Launch Vehicle
- LE-7
- LE-5
