= Expander cycle =

Rocket engine operation method

Diagram of the expander cycle. Heat from the nozzle and combustion chamber powers the fuel and oxidizer pumps.

The expander cycle is a power cycle of a Bipropellant liquid rocket engine. In this cycle, the fuel is used to cool the engine's combustion chamber, picking up heat and changing phase. The now heated and gaseous fuel then powers the turbine that drives the engine's fuel and oxidizer pumps before being injected into the combustion chamber and burned.

Because of the necessary phase change, the expander cycle is thrust limited by the square–cube law. When a bell-shaped nozzle is scaled, the nozzle surface area with which to heat the fuel increases as the square of the radius, but the volume of fuel to be heated increases as the cube of the radius. Thus beyond approximately 3,000 kilonewtons (670,000 pounds-force) of thrust, there is no longer enough nozzle area to heat enough fuel to drive the turbines and hence the fuel pumps. Higher thrust levels can be achieved using a bypass expander cycle where a portion of the fuel bypasses the turbine and or thrust chamber cooling passages and goes directly to the main chamber injector. Non-toroidal aerospike engines are not subject to the limitations from the square-cube law because the engine's linear shape does not scale isometrically: the fuel flow and nozzle area scale linearly with the engine's width. All expander cycle engines need to use a cryogenic fuel such as liquid hydrogen, liquid methane, or liquid propane that easily reaches its boiling point.

Some expander cycle engines may use a gas generator of some kind to start the turbine and run the engine until the heat input from the thrust chamber and nozzle skirt increases as the chamber pressure builds up.

Some examples of an expander cycle engine are the RL10 from Aerojet Rocketdyne and the Vinci engine for Ariane 6.

== Expander bleed cycle ==
Diagram of the expander bleed cycle. Only some of the heat powers the pumps and is then vented.

The expander bleed cycle (also known as the expander open cycle and coolant tap-off) is a modification of the standard expander cycle in which only a portion of the heated propellant is routed through the turbine and then vented overboard instead of entering the combustion chamber. The remaining propellant is injected into the combustion chamber. Bleeding the turbine exhaust can increase turbopump efficiency by reducing backpressure and increasing the pressure drop across the turbine. Compared with a standard expander cycle, the trade-off is higher engine thrust at the expense of efficiency because part of the propellant is discarded after passing through the turbine.

Japan's Mitsubishi Heavy Industries has developed several expander bleed cycle engines. The company's LE-5A became the first expander bleed cycle engine to enter operational service when it flew on the H-II rocket in 1994. The LE-9 became the first expander bleed cycle engine designed for first-stage use to enter service when it debuted on the H3 rocket in 2023. In 2026, the H3-30 became the first launch vehicle whose propulsion system consisted entirely of expander bleed cycle engines.

Blue Origin chose the expander bleed cycle for the BE-3U engine used on the upper stage of its New Glenn launch vehicle.

== Dual expander ==
In a similar way that the staged combustion can be implemented separately on the oxidizer and fuel on the full flow cycle, the expander cycle can be implemented on two separate paths as the dual expander cycle. The use of hot gases of the same chemistry as the liquid for the turbine and pump side of the turbopumps eliminates the need for purges and some failure modes. Additionally, when the density of the fuel and oxidizer is significantly different, as it is in the H_{2}/LOX case, the optimal turbopump speeds differ so much that they need a gearbox between the fuel and oxidizer pumps. The use of dual expander cycle, with separate turbines, eliminates this failure-prone piece of equipment.

Dual expander cycle can be implemented by either using separated sections on the regenerative cooling system for the fuel and the oxidizer, or by using a single fluid for cooling and a heat exchanger to boil the second fluid. In the first case, for example, you could use the fuel to cool the combustion chamber, and the oxidizer to cool the nozzle. In the second case, you could use the fuel to cool the whole engine and a heat exchanger to boil the oxidizer.

== Advantages ==
The expander cycle has a number of advantages over other designs:

Low temperature
After they have turned gaseous, the propellants are usually near room temperature, and do very little or no damage to the turbine, allowing the engine to be reusable. In contrast gas-generator or staged combustion engines operate their turbines at high temperature.
Tolerance
During the development of the RL10 engineers were worried that insulation foam mounted on the inside of the tank might break off and damage the engine. They tested this by putting loose foam in a fuel tank and running it through the engine. The RL10 chewed it up without problems or noticeable degradation in performance. Conventional gas-generators are in practice miniature rocket engines, with all the complexity that implies. Blocking even a small part of a gas generator can lead to a hot spot, which can cause violent loss of the engine. Using the engine bell as a 'gas generator' also makes it very tolerant of fuel contamination because of the wider fuel flow channels used.
Inherent safety
Because a bell-type expander-cycle engine is thrust limited, it can easily be designed to withstand its maximum thrust conditions. In other engine types, a stuck fuel valve or similar problem can lead to engine thrust spiraling out of control due to unintended feedback systems. Other engine types require complex mechanical or electronic controllers to ensure this does not happen. Expander cycles are by design incapable of malfunctioning that way.
Higher vacuum performance
Compared to a pressure-fed engine, pump-fed engines and hence, expander cycle engines have higher combustion chamber pressures. Increased combustion chamber pressures allow for a reduced throat area A_{th}, and therefore, leads to a larger expansion ratio, e = A_{e}/A_{th} for an identical nozzle exit area A_{e}, which ultimately leads to higher vacuum performance.

== Usage ==
Expander cycle engines include the following:

- Aerojet Rocketdyne RL10
- Pratt & Whitney RL60
- ArianeGroup Vinci
- CADB & Pratt & Whitney RD-0146
- Chinese YF-75D
- Mitsubishi Heavy Industries LE-5A / 5B
- Mitsubishi Heavy Industries LE-9
- Aerojet Rocketdyne & MHI MARC-60 (MB-60)
- Blue Origin BE-3U and BE-7
- Avio M10
- Demonstration Rocket for Agile Cislunar Operations (DRACO) nuclear thermal engine

== Comparison of expander-cycle engines ==
	RL10B-2	BE-3U	Vinci	YF-75D	YF-79	RD-0146D	LE-5B	LE-9
Country of origin	United States	United States	France	China	China	Russia	Japan	Japan
Cycle	Expander	Expander bleed	Expander	Expander	Expander	Expander	Expander bleed, chamber expander	Expander bleed
Thrust, vacuum	110 kN (25,000 lbf)	769 kN (173,000 lbf)	180 kN (40,000 lbf)	88.36 kN (19,860 lbf)	250 kN (56,200 lbf)	68.6 kN (15,400 lbf)	137.2 kN (30,840 lbf)	1471 kN (330,000 lbf)
Mixture ratio	5.88		5.8	6.0	6.0		5	5.9
Nozzle ratio	280		240	80	160		110	37
I_{sp}, vacuum (s)	462	455	457	442.6	455.2	470	447	426
Chamber pressure (MPa)	4.412		6.1	4.1	7.0	5.9	3.58	10.0
LH_{2} TP (rpm)			65,000	98,180			52,000	
LOX TP (rpm)							18,000	
Length (m)	4.14		4.2			3.358	2.79	3.8
Dry mass (kg)	277		280	265			285	2400

== See also ==
- Gas-generator cycle
- Combustion tap-off cycle
- Staged combustion cycle
- Pressure-fed engine
- Electric-pump-fed engine
