= LE-7 =

Japanese hydrolox staged combustion rocket engine

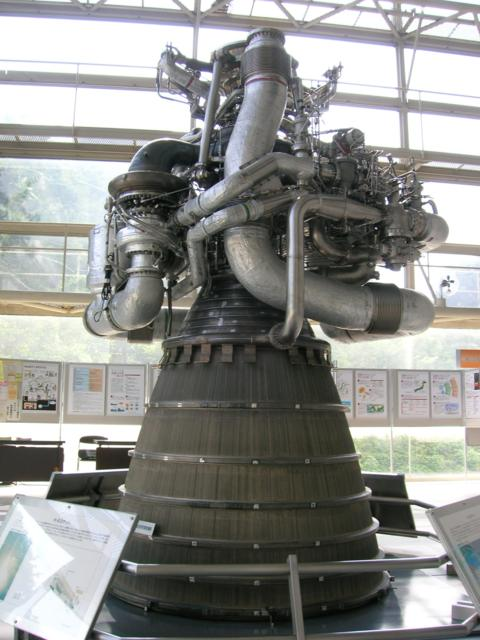
- LE-7, Nagoya City Science Museum, 2006
- Country of origin: Japan
- Designer: JAXA
- Manufacturer: Mitsubishi Heavy Industries
- Application: Booster
- Status: Succeeded by LE-7A upgrade

Liquid-fuel engine
- Propellant: LOX / LH_{2}
- Mixture ratio: 5.9:1
- Cycle: Fuel-rich staged combustion

Configuration
- Chamber: 1
- Nozzle ratio: 52:1

Performance
- Thrust, vacuum: 1,078 kN (242,000 lbf)
- Thrust, sea-level: 843.5 kN (189,600 lbf)
- Thrust-to-weight ratio: 64.13
- Chamber pressure: 12.7 MPa (1,840 psi)
- Specific impulse, vacuum: 446 seconds (4.37 km/s)
- Specific impulse, sea-level: 349 seconds (3.42 km/s)

Dimensions
- Length: 3.4 m
- Dry mass: 1,714 kg (3,779 lb)

Used in
- H-II first stage

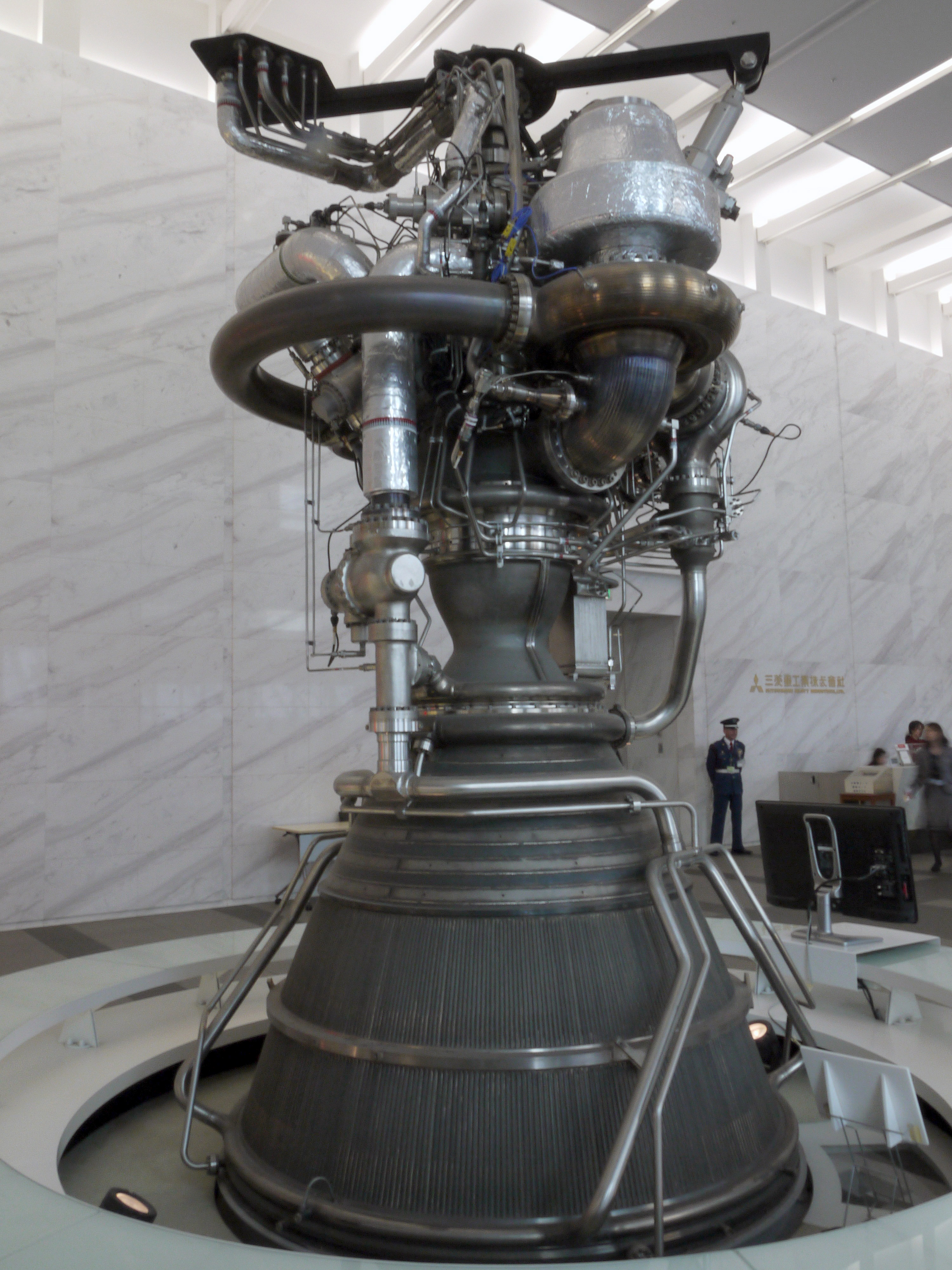
LE-7A, (Mitsubishi Heavy Industries show-room, Shinagawa, Japan)

The LE-7 and its succeeding upgrade model the LE-7A were staged combustion cycle LH_{2}/LOX liquid rocket engines produced in Japan for the H-II series of launch vehicles. Design and production work was all done domestically in Japan, the first major (main/first-stage) liquid rocket engine with that claim, in a collaborative effort from the National Space Development Agency (NASDA), Aerospace Engineering Laboratory (NAL), Mitsubishi Heavy Industries, and Ishikawajima-Harima. NASDA and NAL have since been integrated into JAXA. However, a large part of the work was contracted to Mitsubishi, with Ishikawajima-Harima providing turbomachinery, and the engine is often referred to as the Mitsubishi LE-7(A).

The original LE-7 was an expendable, high efficiency, medium-sized motor with sufficient thrust for use on the H-II.

== H-II Flight 8, only operational LE-7 failure ==
The fuel turbopump had an issue using the originally designed inducer (a propeller-like axial pump used to raise the inlet pressure of the propellant ahead of the main turbopumps to prevent cavitation) where the inducer would itself begin to cavitate and cause an imbalance resulting in excessive vibration. A comprehensive post-flight analysis of the unsuccessful 8th H-II launch, including a deep ocean retrieval of the wreckage, determined that fatigue due to this vibration was the cause of premature engine failure.

== LE-7A ==
The LE-7A was an upgraded model from the LE-7 rocket engine. Basic design is unchanged from the original model. The 7A had additional engineering effort placed on cost cutting, reliability, and performance developments. The renovation was undertaken to mate it with the likewise improved H-IIA launch vehicle, with the common goal being a more reliable, more powerful and flexible, and more cost effective launch system.

=== Changes / improvements ===
Specific emphasis was placed on reducing the amount of required welding by allowing for more machined or cast components, and to simplify as many of the remaining welds as possible. This resulted in a substantial rework of the pipe routing (which makes the outward appearance of the two models considerably different). To combat the fuel inducer complications described above, the fuel inducer was redesigned for the 7A. The oxidizer inducer was also redesigned, but this was primarily due to poor performance at low inlet pressures as opposed to reliability concerns. The fuel turbopump itself was also the subject of various durability enhancements. Additionally the combustion chamber/injector assembly underwent a number of small changes, like decreasing the number of injector elements, to reduce machining complexity (and thus cost) and improve reliability. While these changes overall resulted in a drop in maximum specific impulse to 440 seconds (4.3 km/s) (basically making the engine less fuel efficient), the trade off for lower cost and enhanced reliability was considered acceptable.

=== New nozzle design (side-loading problem) ===
For the new engine model, a nozzle extension was designed that could be added to the base of the new standard “short” nozzle when extra performance was required. But when the engine was fitted with the nozzle extension, the 7A encountered a new problem with unprecedented side-loads and irregular heating on the nozzle strong enough to damage the gimbal actuators and regenerative cooling tubes during startup. Meticulous computational fluid dynamics (CFD) work was able to sufficiently replicate and trace the dangerous transient loading and a new one-piece “long” nozzle with full regenerative cooling (as opposed to the original short nozzle with a separate film-cooled extension) was designed to mitigate the problem. Before this new nozzle was ready, some H-IIA's were launched using only the short nozzle. The 7A no longer uses a separate nozzle extension in any configuration.

=== Use on H-IIB ===
The new H-IIB launch vehicles used two LE-7A engines in its first stage.

=== LE-7A specifications ===
- Operational cycle: staged combustion
- Fuel: hydrogen
- Oxidizer: liquid oxygen
- Mixture ratio (oxidizer to fuel): 5.90
- Short nozzle:
  - Rated thrust (sea level): 843 kN (190,000 lbf)
  - Rated thrust (vacuum): 1,074 kN (241,000 lbf)
  - Specific impulse (sea level):
  - Specific impulse (vacuum): 429 seconds (4.21 km/s)
- Long nozzle:
  - Rated thrust (sea level): 870 kN (200,000 lbf)
  - Rated thrust (vacuum): 1,098 kN (247,000 lbf)
  - Specific impulse (sea level): 338 seconds (3.31 km/s)
  - Specific impulse (vacuum): 440 seconds (4.3 km/s)
- Dry mass: 1,800 kg (4,000 lb)
- Length:
  - short nozzle: 3.2 m
  - long nozzle: 3.7 m
- Throttle capability: 72–100%
- Thrust-to-weight: 65.9
- Nozzle area ratio: 51.9:1
- Combustion chamber pressure: 12.0 MPa (1,740 psi)
- Liquid hydrogen turbopump: 41,900 rpm
- Liquid oxygen turbopump: 18,300 rpm

== See also ==
- LE-5
- LE-9
- H-II, H-IIA, & H-IIB
- Comparison of orbital rocket engines
- Liquid-fuel rocket
- Staged combustion cycle
- JAXA
