= BE-7 =

Small dual-expander cycle rocket engine by Blue Origin

Blue Engine 7
- Country of origin: United States
- Manufacturer: Blue Origin
- Application: Aerospace
- Status: Active

Liquid-fuel engine
- Propellant: LOX / LH_{2}

Performance
- Thrust: 10,000 lbf (44,000 N)
- Throttle range: 20–100%
- Specific impulse, vacuum: 460 s (4.5 km/s)

Used in
- Blue Moon

The Blue Engine 7 is a liquid hydrogen/oxygen dual expander cycle engine for use with the Blue Moon family of lunar landers. The company utilizes additive manufacturing in the development process and it is meant to generate 10,000 lbf (44,000 N) of thrust, serving as both the ascent and descent engines for Blue Moon.

== History ==
Following the commencement of the Artemis Program the company sought to independently develop a lunar lander, the 'MK1' and accompanying engine. The BE-7 test phase began in 2019 with additional hot fire testing in 2020 at the Marshall Space Flight Center. Following selection for NASA's second Human Landing System, which Blue Origin calls 'MK2', the company announced that the BE-7 engine will be used for both landers. A demonstration flight of the MK1, planned for 2025 is on track and will debut the BE-7 engine. In 2024, the company announced vacuum cell testing was being conducted on the engine at the Edwards Air Force Base.

On June 17, 2026, Blue Origin conducted a continuous static fire of the BE-7 lasting approximately 2,500 seconds, breaking the record for longest-duration hot fire of a chemical rocket engine. The previous mark was the 2,017-second firing of the Space Shuttle Main Engine (RS-25) in 1988, then the longest rocket engine test firing on record.

== Technical specifications ==
The BE-7 utilizes liquid hydrogen and liquid oxygen propellants in a dual expander cycle generating up to 10,000 pounds-force of thrust which can be throttled to 2,000 pounds-force. The company hopes that the propellants can, in the future, utilize ISRU and be produced from ice in the polar regions of the moon.

As of 2023, the engine is also planned to be used to power the Artemis transfer element, the Cislunar Transporter, which will move the Blue Moon lander from a highly-elliptical, near-rectilinear halo orbit around the Moon to a low lunar orbit. The transfer element is in development by Lockheed Martin.

== See also ==
- Lunar Module Descent Engine – used on the Apollo Lunar Module's Descent Stage
- Lunar Module Ascent Engine – used on the Apollo Lunar Module's Ascent Stage
- RL10 – Ubiquitous LOX/LH2 expander cycle engine
