= Combustion tap-off cycle =

Rocket engine power cycle

Diagram of the open-cycle combustion tap-off rocket cycle. A small portion of exhaust from the combustion chamber is tapped off to power the turbine(s).

The combustion tap-off cycle is a power cycle of a bipropellant rocket engine. The cycle takes a small portion of hot exhaust gas from the rocket engine's combustion chamber and routes it through turbopump turbines to pump fuel before being exhausted (similar to the gas-generator cycle). Since fuel is exhausted, the tap-off cycle is considered an open-cycle engine. The cycle is comparable to a gas-generator cycle engine with turbines driven by main combustion chamber exhaust rather than a separate gas generator or preburner.

The J-2S rocket engine, a cancelled engine developed by NASA, used the combustion tap-off cycle and was first successfully tested in 1969.

By 2013, Blue Origin, with their New Shepard launch vehicle, had successfully flight-tested the BE-3 engine using a tap-off cycle. According to Blue Origin, the cycle is particularly suited to human spaceflight due to its simplicity, with only one combustion chamber and a less stressful engine shutdown process. However, engine startup is more complicated, and due to the hot gas fed from the main combustion chamber into the turbopumps, the turbine must be built to withstand higher-than-normal temperatures. In contrast, the upper-stage variant of the BE-3, the BE-3U, uses an expander cycle to power the turbopump, and is used on the upper stage of the New Glenn launch vehicle.

The Reaver 1 engine in Firefly Alpha uses a tap-off cycle. It first flew in September 2021 then made it to orbit on its second attempt in October 2022.

== See also ==
- Expander cycle
- Pressure-fed engine
- Rocket engine
- Staged combustion cycle
- Gas-generator cycle
- Electric-pump-fed engine
