= LE-5 =

Japanese hydrolox rocket engine used on the H3 upper stage

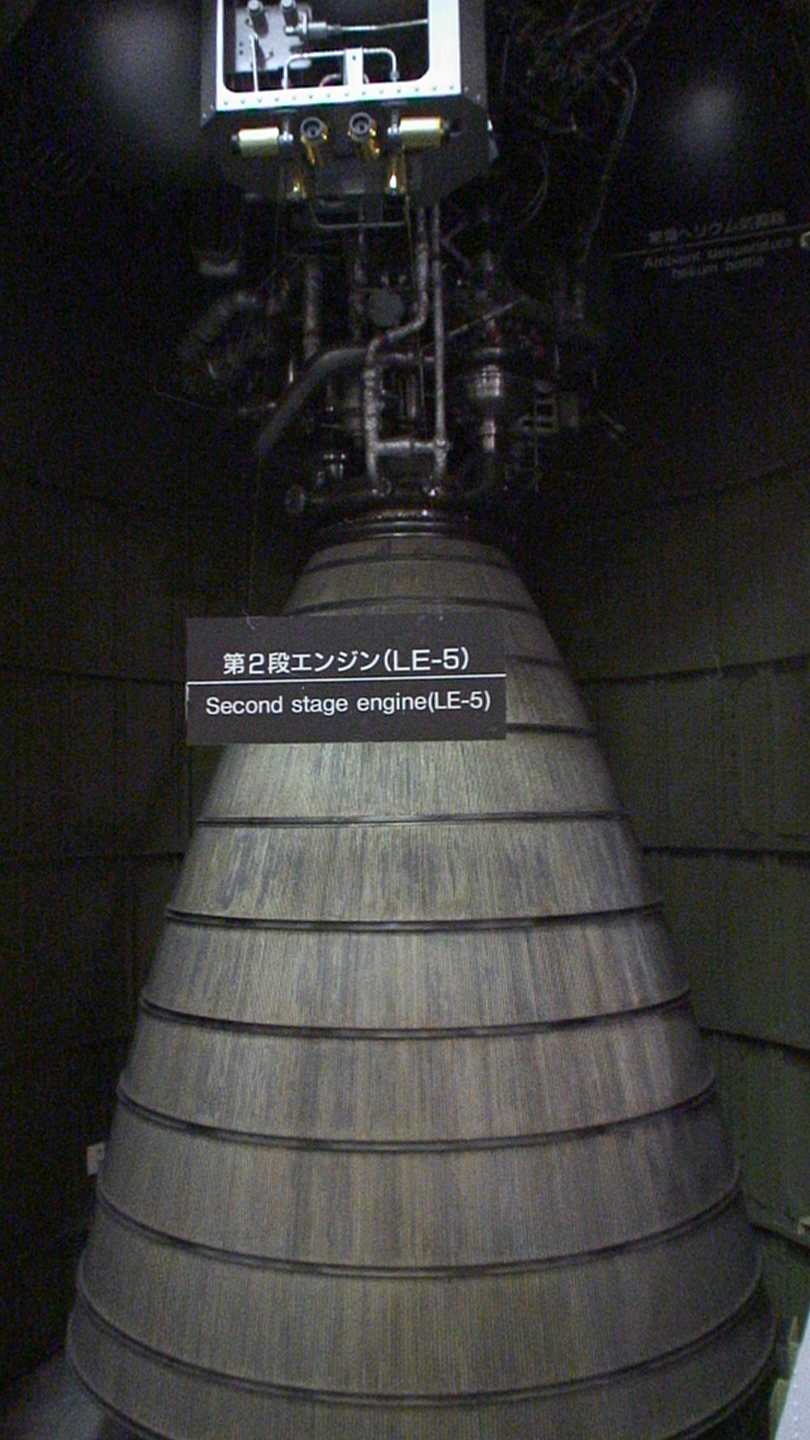
LE-5

The LE-5 liquid rocket engine and its derivative models were developed in Japan to meet the need for an upper stage propulsion system for the H-I and H-II series of launch vehicles. It is a cryogenic bipropellant design, using LH_{2} and LOX. Primary design and production work was carried out by Mitsubishi Heavy Industries. In terms of liquid rockets, it is a fairly small engine, both in size and thrust output, being in the 89 kN (20,000 lbf) and the more recent models the 130 kN (30,000 lbf) thrust class.

The engine is capable of multiple restarts, due to a spark ignition system as opposed to the single use pyrotechnic or hypergolic igniters commonly used on some contemporary engines. Though rated for up to 16 starts and 40+ minutes of firing time, on the H-II the engine is considered expendable, being used for one flight and jettisoned. It is sometimes started only once for a nine-minute burn, but in missions to GTO the engine is often fired a second time to inject the payload into the higher orbit after a temporary low Earth orbit has been established.

The original LE-5 was built as a second stage engine for the H-I launch vehicle. It used a fairly conventional gas generator cycle. Later versions used an expander bleed cycle.

== LE-5A ==
The LE-5A was a heavily redesigned version of the LE-5 intended for use on the new H-II launch vehicle's second stage. The major difference is that the operation of the engine was switched from the gas generator to expander bleed cycle. The LE-5A was the world's first expander bleed cycle engine to be put into operational service. Cryogenic liquid hydrogen fuel for the cycle is drawn through tubes and passages in both the engine's nozzle and combustion chamber where the hydrogen heats up incredibly while simultaneously cooling those components. The heating of the initially cold fuel causes it to expand, and it is utilized to drive the turbine for the propellant pumps.

== LE-5B ==
The LE-5B was a further modified version of the LE-5A. The changes focused on lowering the per-unit cost of the engine while continuing to increase reliability. The modifications veered towards simplification and cheaper production where possible at the cost of actually lowering the specific impulse to 447 seconds, the lowest of all three models. However, it produced the highest thrust of the three and was significantly cheaper. The primary change from the 5A model was that the 5B's expander bleed system circulated fuel around only the combustion chamber as opposed to both the chamber and the nozzle in the 5A. Alterations to the combustion chamber cooling passages and constituent materials were made with special emphasis on effective heat transfer to allow this method to be successful. The engine can be throttled to 5% idle mode.

== LE-5B-2 ==
After flight F5 of H-IIA on March 28, 2003 resulted in severe (although not damaging) vibration of the upper stage during LE-5B firing, work was initiated on an upgraded version of the LE-5B. The upgraded engine, named LE-5B-2, was first flown on a H-IIB on September 10, 2009. The main fixes were adding flow-laminarizing plates in the expander manifold, a new mixer of gaseous and liquid hydrogen in the hydrogen feed line, and a new injector plate with 306 smaller coaxial injectors (versus 180 in LE-5B). The upgrade reduced the vibrations produced by the upper stage by half.

== LE-5B-3 ==
For the H3 launch vehicle, the LE-5B engine was updated to improve performance, lower costs, and ensure long-term parts availability while keeping development risk low. Obsolete components, including electronics in the engine controller, were replaced with newer parts, and updates were made to the combustion chamber, turbopumps, turbine nozzle, and fuel mixer to support the H3's longer missions.

Compared with the earlier LE-5B-2, the LE-5B-3 increased specific impulse from 446.8 to 448.0 seconds (4.382 to 4.393 km/s) through improvements to the hydrogen mixer, which improved fuel flow inside the engine. This increase allows roughly 40 kilograms (88 lb) of additional payload to be carried to geostationary transfer orbit.

The planned firing duration was also extended from 534 seconds to 740 seconds to meet H3 mission requirements. During earlier development work, fatigue cracks had been found in parts of the fuel turbopump after long-duration operation. To address this, the turbine design was revised to reduce stress and improve durability during longer burns.

The first example of the updated engine was test-fired in March 2017. After two qualification test campaigns, development of the LE-5B-3 was completed in May 2019.

During the 2023 maiden flight of the H3, the LE-5B-3 failed to ignite because of an electrical circuit failure between the vehicle controller and the engine igniter. The rocket subsequently lost velocity and, 14 minutes and 50 seconds into the flight, a destruct command was issued.

== Specifications ==
		LE-5	LE-5A	LE-5B	LE-5B-2	LE-5B-3
Used on		H‑I	H‑II	H‑IIA	H‑IIA, H‑IIB	H3
Operational cycle		Gas generator	Expander bleed (nozzle / chamber)	Expander bleed (chamber)		
Rated thrust	kN (lb_{F})	102.9 (23,100)	121.5 (27,300)	137.2 (30,800)		
Oxidizer to fuel ratio		5.5	5			
Expansion ratio		140	130	110		
Specific impulse, I_{sp}	sec. (km/s)	450 (4.4)	452 (4.43)	446.8 (4.382)		448 (4.39)
Chamber pressure	MPa (PSI)	3.65 (529)	3.98 (577)	3.58 (519)		3.61 (524)
LH_{2} rotational speed	rpm	50,000	51,000	52,000	53,504	52,000
LOX rotational speed	rpm	16,000	17,000	18,000	18,560	18,000
Length	m (ft)	2.67 (8.76)		2.79 (9.21)		
Diameter		4 (13.1)				
Weight	kg (lbs)	255 (562)	248 (547)	285 (628)	298 (657)	303 (668)
Throttleable?		No	No	Yes		
Down to		—N/a	—N/a	60%, 30%, 3%*		
Ref						

*, tank head pressure only

== See also ==
- H-I Japanese carrier rocket
- H-II Japanese carrier rocket
- H-IIA Japanese carrier rocket
- H-IIB Japanese carrier rocket
- LE-7 – Japanese hydrolox staged combustion rocket engine
- LE-9 – Japanese hydrolox expander rocket engine
- Development of the LE-X Engine, MHI Technical Review Vol. 48 No. 4
