= YF-75D =

Chinese rocket engine

- Country of origin: China
- First flight: Long March 5 inaugural flight (2016-11-03)
- Manufacturer: Academy of Aerospace Liquid Propulsion Technology
- Associated LV: Long March 5
- Predecessor: YF-75
- Status: In service

Liquid-fuel engine
- Propellant: Liquid oxygen / liquid hydrogen
- Mixture ratio: 6.0 (adjustable)
- Cycle: Expander cycle

Configuration
- Chamber: 1
- Nozzle ratio: 80

Performance
- Thrust, vacuum: 88.36 kilonewtons (19,860 lb_{f})
- Chamber pressure: 4.1 MPa (590 psi)
- Specific impulse, vacuum: 442.6 seconds (4.340 km/s)
- Burn time: 780 seconds (13.0 min)

Used in
- Long March 5 H5-2 second stage.

The YF-75D is a cryogenic rocket engine burning liquid hydrogen and liquid oxygen in a closed expander cycle. It is China's third generation of upper stage cryogenic propellant engine, after the YF-73 and the YF-75. It is used in a dual engine mount in the H5-2 second stage of the Long March 5 launch vehicles. Within the mount, each engine can gimbal individually to enable thrust vectoring control. As with its predecessor YF-75, the YF-75D can adjust its mixture ratio to optimize propellant consumption. As an additional improvement it can do multiple restarts, against the single one of its predecessor.

The combustion chamber required a redesign to keep the power balance. Since the expander cycle uses the heat extracted from the cooling circuits to drive the turbines, the chamber had to be lengthened and the cooling passages redesigned. The engine uses a redesigned hydrogen turbine. It uses an axial two-staged low pressure ratio subsonic turbine that operates at 65,000 rpm, which is between the second and third critical speed. It rests on dual elastic support dampers around the ceramic ball bearings.

== YF-75E ==
The YF-75E engine is based on the YF-75D engine, and the nozzle ratio is increased to improve its working performance. It is expected to be used in the third stage of the Long March 10 launch vehicle.

== Specifications ==
	YF-75D	YF-75E
Vacuum thrust:	88.36 kN	92.108 kN
Specific impulse (vacuum) -Isp:	442.6 seconds (4.340 km/s)	451.1 seconds (4.424 km/s)
Chamber pressure:	4.1 MPa	4.1 MPa
Mixture ratio:	6.0	6.0
Nozzle ratio:	80	175
Engine weight - dry:	265 kg	—
propellants:	LOX/LH2	LOX/LH2
Diameter:	1.08 m	1.6 m
Thrust to Weight Ratio:	34.0	—
Vehicle application:	Second stage of Long March 5	Third stage of Long March 10
