= H-II =

Japanese rocket

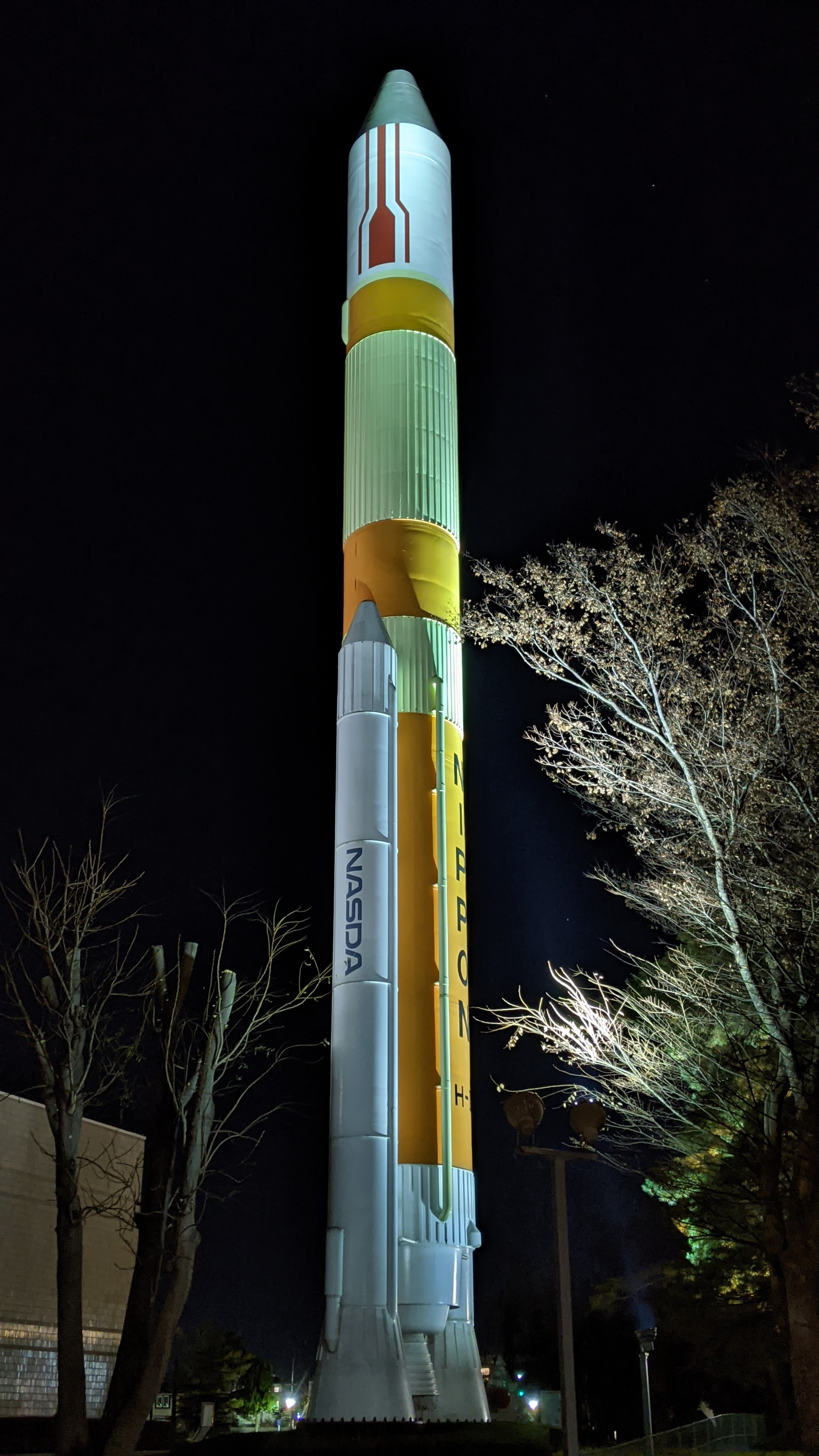
- H-II rocket at Tsukuba science museum & planetarium
- Function: Medium-lift launch vehicle
- Manufacturer: Mitsubishi Heavy Industries; Nissan Motors (sub); Alliant Techsystems (sub, for the SRBs)
- Country of origin: Japan

Size
- Height: 49 m (161 ft)
- Diameter: 4 m (13 ft)
- Mass: 260,000 kg (570,000 lb)
- Stages: 2

Capacity

Payload to LEO
- Mass: 10,060 kg (22,180 lb)

Payload to GTO
- Mass: 3,930 kg (8,660 lb)

Associated rockets
- Family: H-II family
- Based on: H-I
- Derivative work: H-IIA
- Comparable: Ariane 4, LVM3

Launch history
- Status: Retired
- Launch sites: Tanegashima, LA-Y1
- Total launches: 7
- Success(es): 5
- Failure: 1
- Partial failure: 1
- First flight: 3 February 1994
- Last flight: 15 November 1999

Boosters
- No. boosters: 2
- Maximum thrust: 1,540 kN (350,000 lb_{f})
- Specific impulse: 273 s (2.68 km/s)
- Burn time: 94 seconds

First stage
- Powered by: 1 × LE-7
- Maximum thrust: 1,078 kN (242,000 lb_{f})
- Specific impulse: 446 s (4.37 km/s)
- Burn time: 346 seconds
- Propellant: LH_{2} / LOX

Second stage
- Powered by: 1 × LE-5A
- Maximum thrust: 121.5 kN (27,300 lb_{f})
- Specific impulse: 452 s (4.43 km/s)
- Burn time: 600 seconds
- Propellant: LH_{2} / LOX

The H-II (H2) rocket was a Japanese satellite launch system, which flew seven times between 1994 and 1999, with five successes. It was developed by NASDA in order to give Japan a capability to launch larger satellites in the 1990s. It was the first two-stage liquid-fuelled rocket Japan made using only technologies developed domestically. It was superseded by the H-IIA rocket following reliability and cost issues.

== Background ==
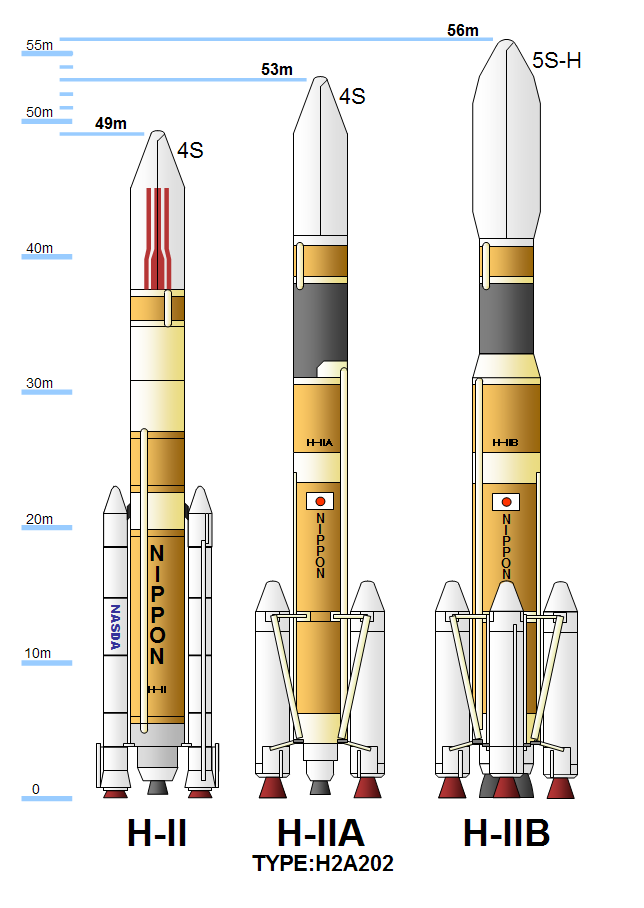
Comparison of H-II series of rockets. From left: H‑II, H‑IIA, and H‑IIB

Prior to H-II, NASDA had to use components licensed by the United States in its rockets. In particular, crucial technologies of H-I and its predecessors were from the Delta rockets (the manufacturer of the Delta rockets, McDonnell Douglas, later Boeing and the United Launch Alliance, would later use the H-IIA's technologies (the rocket itself is the successor to the H-II) to create the Delta III, albeit short lived). Although the H-I did have some domestically produced components, such as LE-5 engine on the second stage and inertial guidance system, the most crucial part, the first stage engine, was a licence-built version of the Thor-ELT of the US. By developing the LE-7 liquid-fuel engine and the solid booster rockets for the first stage, all stages of H-II had become "domestically developed".

The H-II was developed under the following policies, according to a NASDA press release:

1. Develop the launch vehicle with Japanese space technology.
2. Reduce both development period and costs by utilizing developed technologies as much as possible.
3. Develop a vehicle which can be launched from the existing Tanegashima Space Center.
4. Use design criteria which allows sufficient performance for both the main systems and subsystems. Ensure that development will be carried out properly, and safety is taken into account.

The H-II was new, incorporating larger LH_{2}/LOX tanks, and a new upper stage, consisting of a cylindrical LH_{2} tank with a capsule-shaped LOX tank. The LH_{2} tank cylinder carried payload launch loads, while the LOX tank and engine were suspended below within the rocket's inter-stage. The second stage was powered by a single LE-5A engine.

== History ==
Development of the LE-7 engine which started in 1984 was not without hardships, and a worker died in an accidental explosion. The first engine was completed in 1994, two years behind the original schedule. The Rocket Systems Corporation (RSC), a consortium of 74 companies including Mitsubishi Heavy Industries, Nissan Motors, and NEC, was established in 1990 to manage launch operations after the rockets' completion. In 1992, it had 33 employees.

In 1994, NASDA succeeded in launching the first H-II rocket, and succeeded in five launches by 1997. However, each launch cost 19 billion yen (US$190 million), too expensive compared to international competitors like Ariane. (This is in part due to the Plaza Accord's changes to the exchange rate, which was 240 yen to a dollar when the project planning started in 1982, but had changed to 100 yen a dollar by 1994.) Development of the next-generation H-IIA rockets started in order to minimize launch costs.

In 1996, RSC signed a contract with the Hughes Space and Communications Group to launch 10 satellites. The successive failure of flight 5 in 1998 and flight 8 in the following year brought an end to the H-II series and the contract with Hughes. To investigate the cause of the failure and to direct resources into the H-IIA, NASDA cancelled flight 7 (which was to be launched after F8 due to changes in schedule), and terminated the H-II series.

== Launch history ==
Flight	Date (UTC)	Launch site	Payload	Orbit	Outcome
TF1	3 February 1994; 22:20	Tanegashima, LA‑Y1	OREX, VEP	LEO / GTO	Success
TF1	First flight of the H-II launch vehicle. Launched OREX (Orbital Re-entry Experiment, nicknamed Ryūsei) and VEP-1 (Vehicle Evaluation Payload 1, nicknamed Myōjō)				
TF2	28 August 1994; 07:50	Tanegashima, LA‑Y1	ETS-VI	GEO	Success
TF2	Launched ETS-VI (Engineering Test Satellite VI, nicknamed Kiku-6)				
TF3	18 March 1995; 08:01	Tanegashima, LA‑Y1	GMS-5, SFU	GEO / LEO	Success
TF3	Launched GMS-5 (Geostationary Meteorological Satellite-5, nicknamed Himawari 5) and SFU (Space Flyer Unit)				
F4	17 August 1996; 01:53	Tanegashima, LA‑Y1	ADEOS I, Fuji OSCAR 29, JAS-2	LEO	Success
F4	Launched ADEOS I (Advanced Earth Observing Satellite I, nicknamed Midori), Fuji OSCAR 29 and JAS-2				
F6	November 27, 1997; 21:27	Tanegashima, LA‑Y1	TRMM, ETS-VII	LEO	Success
F6	Launched TRMM (Tropical Rainfall Measuring Mission) and ETS-VII (Engineering Test Satellite VII, nicknamed Kiku-7)				
F5	February 21, 1998; 07:55	Tanegashima, LA‑Y1	COMETS	GEO	Partial failure
F5	Launched COMETS (Communications and Broadcasting Engineering Test Satellites, nicknamed Kakehashi). Faulty brazing in second-stage engine cooling system caused engine burn through and cable damage resulting in shutdown midway through the upper stage's second burn, leaving spacecraft in elliptical LEO instead of GTO. Spacecraft thrusters raised orbit enough to complete some communications experiments.				
F8	November 15, 1999; 07:29	Tanegashima, LA‑Y1	MTSAT	GEO	Failure
F8	Launched MTSAT (Multi-Functional Transport Satellite). Cavitation in the first stage hydrogen turbopump impeller caused an impeller blade to fracture, resulting in loss of fuel and rapid shutdown of the engine at T+239 s. The vehicle impacted the ocean 380 km NW of Chichijima.				

== Gallery ==
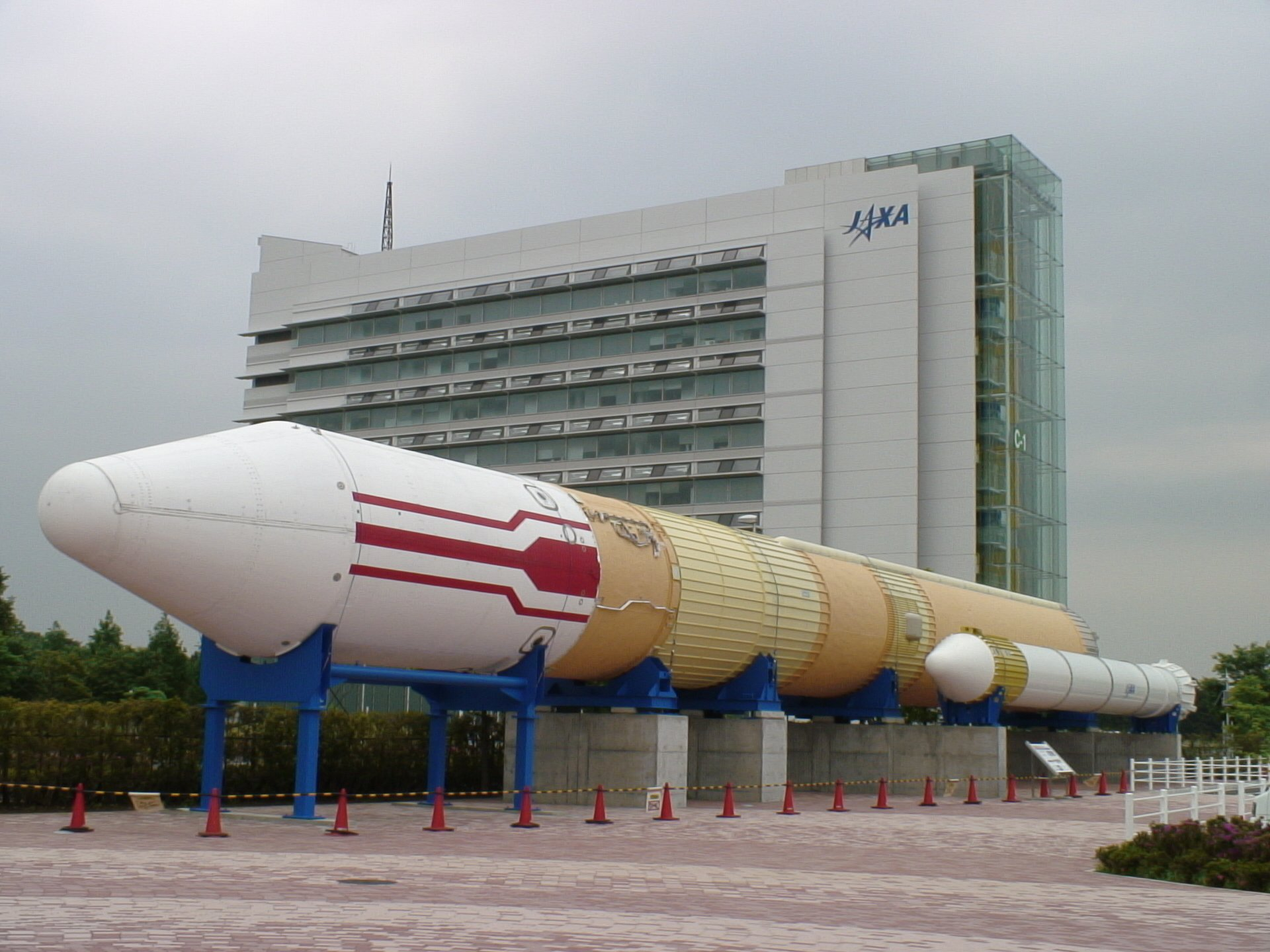
The Ground Test Vehicle of H-II, now installed at Tsukuba Space Center.

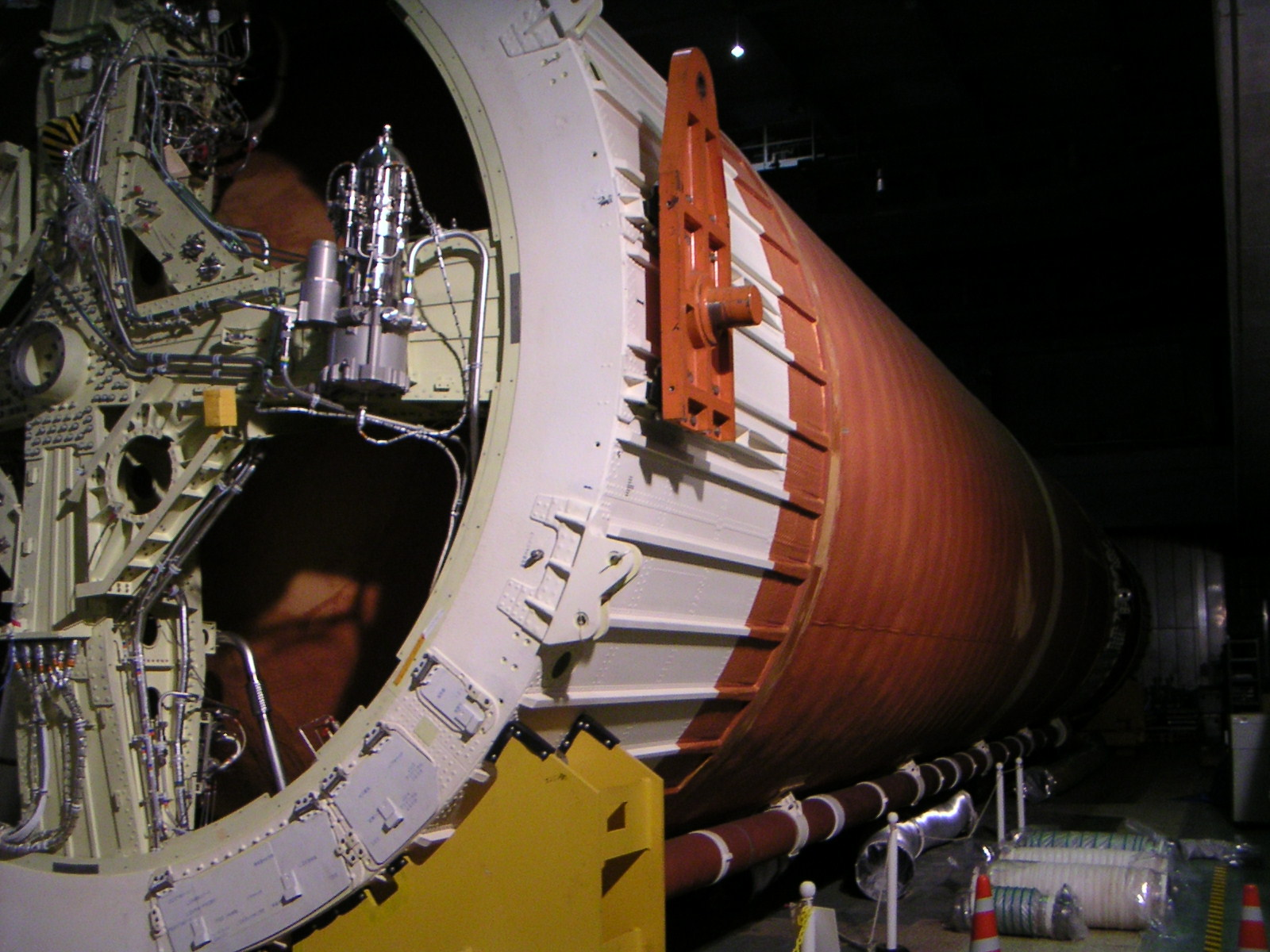
The first and second stages of the canceled Flight 7, at a hangar in Tanegashima Space Center.

== See also ==
- H-II Orbiting Plane (HOPE)
- H-II Transfer Vehicle (HTV)
- H-II (rocket family)
  - H-IIA
  - H-IIB
- Comparison of orbital launchers families
- Comparison of orbital launch systems
