= Propulsion Cryogenics & Advanced Development =

Propulsion Cryogenics & Advanced Development (PCAD), was a NASA rocket engine development project from 2005 to 2010 that included methalox engines (liquid methane and liquid oxygen).

Ablative engines were developed by KT engineering, and Aerojet. A regeneratively cooled engine was developed by XCOR/ATK.
