= Regenerative cooling (rocketry) =

Passing cold propellant through tubes around a rocket engine to cool it

In rocket engine design, regenerative cooling is a configuration in which some or all of the propellant is passed through tubes, channels, or in a jacket around the combustion chamber or nozzle to cool the engine. This is effective because the propellants are often cryogenic. The heated propellant is then fed into a special gas-generator or injected directly into the main combustion chamber.

== History ==
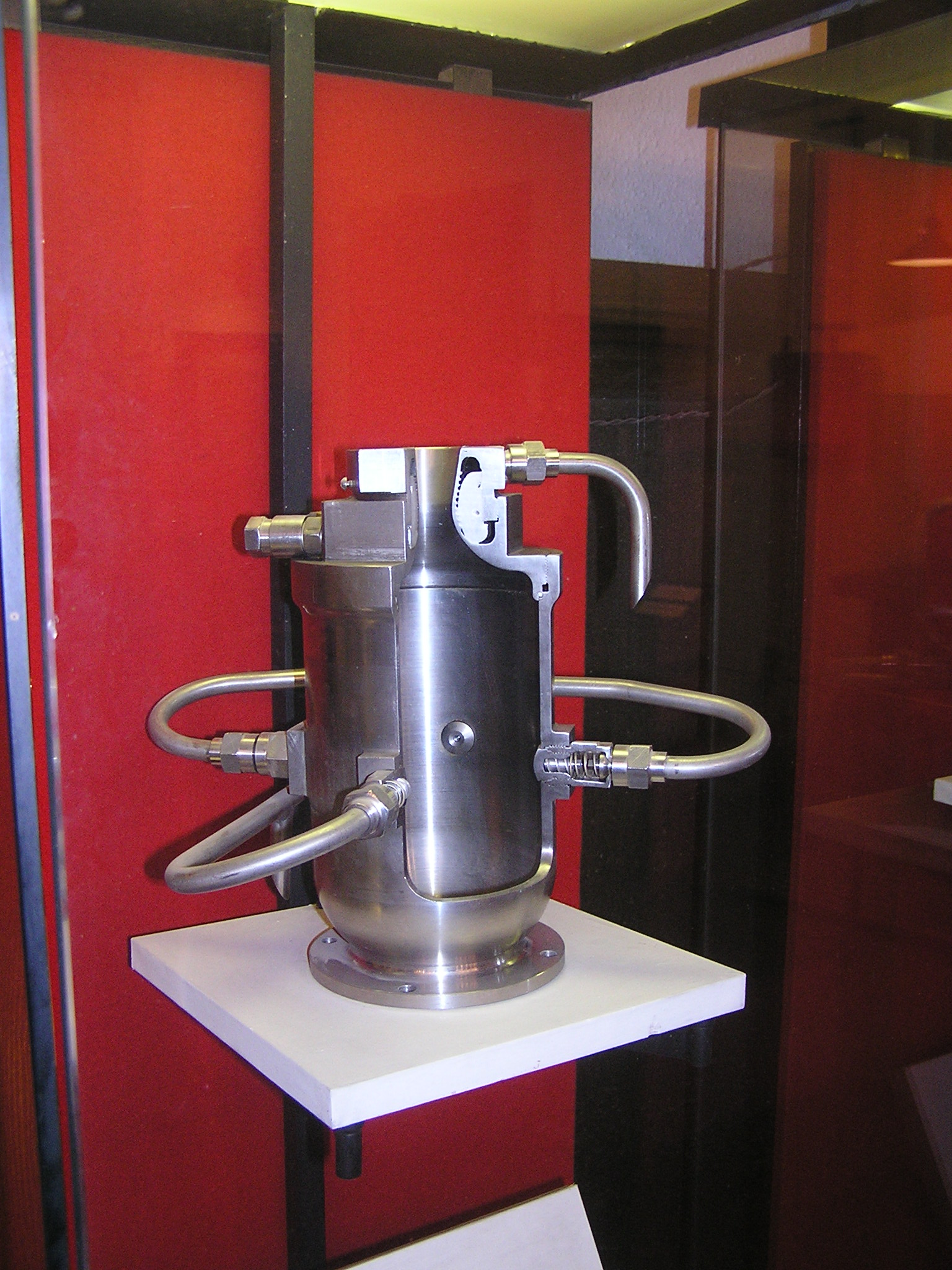
Cut-away of the ORM-50 engine, cooling jacket on the nozzle is visible

In 1857 Carl Wilhelm Siemens introduced the concept of regenerative cooling. On 10 May, 1895, James Dewar used regenerative cooling to become the first to statically liquefy hydrogen. The concept of regenerative cooling was also mentioned in 1903 in an article by Konstantin Tsiolkovsky. Robert Goddard built the first regeneratively cooled engine in 1923, but rejected the scheme as too complex. A regeneratively cooled engine was built by the Italian researcher, Gaetano Arturo Crocco in 1930. The first Soviet engines to employ the technique were Fridrikh Tsander's OR-2 tested in March 1933 and the ORM-50, bench tested in November 1933 by Valentin Glushko. The first German engine of this type was also tested in March 1933 by Klaus Riedel in the VfR. The Austrian scientist Eugen Sänger was particularly famous for experiments with engine cooling starting in 1933; however, most of his experimental engines were water-cooled or cooled by an extra circuit of propellant.

The V-2 rocket engine, the most powerful of its time at 25 tons (245 kN) of thrust, was regeneratively cooled, in a design by Walter Thiel, by fuel pumped around the outside of the combustion chamber between the combustion chamber itself and an outer shell that conformed to the chamber and was separated by a few millimeters. This design was found to be insufficient to cool the combustion chamber due to the use of steel for the combustion chamber, and an additional system of fuel lines were added outside with connections through both combustion chamber shells to inject fuel directly into the chamber at an angle along the inner surface to further cool the chamber in a system called film cooling. This inefficient design required the burning of diluted alcohol at low chamber pressure to avoid melting the engine. The American Redstone engine used the same design.

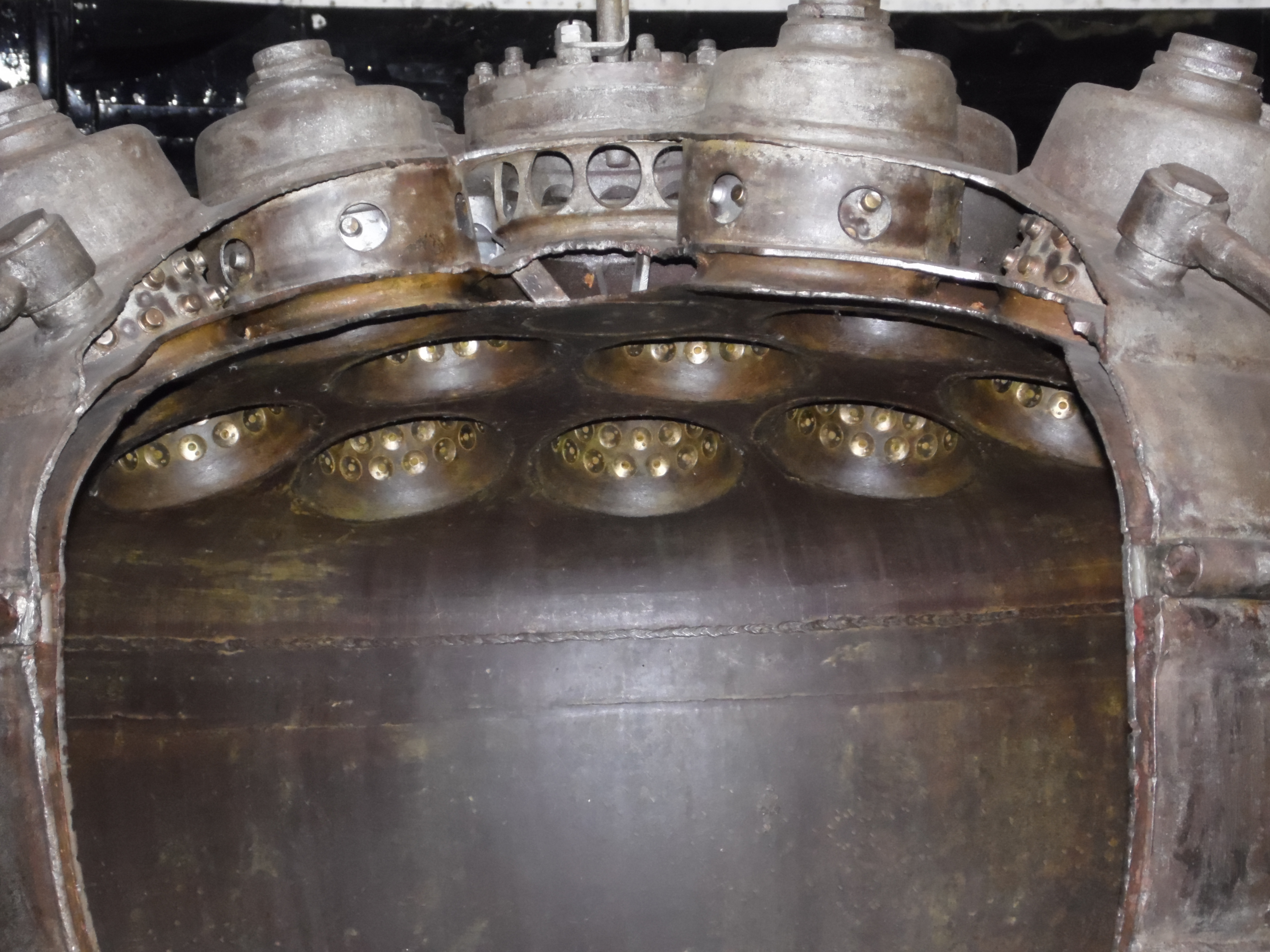
Double-walled construction of a V2 rocket engine

A key innovation in regenerative cooling was the Soviet U-1250 engine designed by Aleksei Mihailovich Isaev in 1945. Its combustion chamber was lined with a thin copper sheet supported by the corrugated steel wall of the chamber. Fuel flowed through the corrugations and absorbed heat very efficiently. This permitted more energetic fuels and higher chamber pressures, and is the basic plan used in all Russian engines since. American engines usually solved this problem by lining the combustion chamber with brazed copper or nickel alloy tubes. Only recently engines like the RS-68 have started to use the cheaper Russian technique. The American style of lining the engine with copper tubes is called the "spaghetti construction", and the concept is credited to Edward A. Neu at Reaction Motors Inc. in 1947.

== Mechanism ==
Regenerative cooling remains the predominant method for managing the thermal loads in thrust chambers. Typically the rocket fuel acts as a coolant as it enters the engine through passages at the nozzle exit. It traverses the high-heat throat region and exits near the injector face. These passages are created either by brazing cooling tubes to the thrust chamber or by milling channels along the chamber walls. The cross-sections of these passages are smaller, increasing the coolant velocity and maximizing cooling efficiency in high-heat areas.

=== Heat flow and temperature ===
The heat flux through the chamber wall is very high; usually in the range of 0.8–80 MW/m^{2} (0.5-50 BTU/in^{2}-sec). A common method for estimating the heat flux flowing out from the hot combustion gases is to use the Bartz equation:
$$h_g = \frac{0.026}{D_{*}^{0.2}} \left(  \frac{\mu^{0.2}c_p} {Pr^{0.6}}\right)  \left( \frac{p_c}{c^{*}}\right)^{0.8}   \left(\frac{D_{*}}{r_c} \right)^{0.1} \left( \frac{A_t}{A} \right)^{0.9}\sigma$$

- $h_g$ is the heat transfer coefficient from the hot combustion gas to the chamber/nozzle interior wall (W/m²/K)
- $D_*$ is the diameter of the chamber throat (m)
- $\mu$ is the dynamic viscosity of the combustion gas (Pa s)
- $c_p$ is the specific heat capacity of the combustion gas (J/kg/K)
- $Pr$ is the Prandtl number of the combustion gas
- $p_c$ is the chamber pressure (Pa)
- $\ce{c^{\ast}}$ is the characteristic velocity of the combustion reaction (m/s)
- $r_c$ is the radius of curvature of the throat wall (m)
- $A_t$ is the cross sectional area of the chamber throat (m^{2})
- $A$ is the cross sectional area of the chamber/nozzle at the point of interest (m^{2})
- $\sigma$ is a dimensionless parameter accounting for variation of gas properties across the boundary layer:

$$\sigma = \frac{1} {\left(\frac{1}{2}\frac{T_w}{T_c}(1+\frac{\gamma-1}{2}M^{2})+\frac{1}{2}\right)^{0.8-\omega/5} \left(1+\frac{\gamma-1}{2}M^{2}\right)^{\omega/5}}$$

- $T_w$ is the temperature of the chamber/nozzle interior wall (K)
- $T_c$ is the chamber temperature (K)
- $\gamma$ is the ratio of specific heats of the combustion gas
- $M$ is the Mach number of the combustion gas at the point of interest
- $\omega$ is the exponent of a viscosity-temperature power law for the combustion gas. A common estimation is 0.6. See temperature dependence of viscosity.

The amount of heat that can flow into the coolant is controlled by many factors including the temperature difference between the chamber and the coolant, the heat transfer coefficient, the thermal conductivity of the chamber wall, the velocity of the fluid inside the coolant channels, the velocity of the gas flow in the chamber/nozzle as well as the heat capacity and incoming temperature of the fluid used as a coolant.

Two boundary layers form: one in the hot gas in the chamber (which is modeled with the Bartz equation above) and the other in the coolant within the channels.

Very typically most of the temperature drop occurs in the gas boundary layer since gases are relatively poor conductors. This boundary layer can be destroyed however by combustion instabilities, and wall failure can follow very soon afterwards.

The boundary layer within the coolant channels can also be disrupted if the coolant is at subcritical pressure and film boils; the gas then forms an insulating layer and the wall temperature climbs very rapidly and soon fails. However, if the coolant engages in nucleate boiling but does not form a film, this helps disrupt the coolant boundary layer and the gas bubbles formed rapidly collapse; this can triple the maximum heat flow. However, many modern engines with turbopumps use supercritical coolants, and these techniques can be seldom used.

Regenerative cooling is seldom used in isolation; film cooling, transpiration cooling, radiation cooling are frequently employed as well.

=== Mechanical considerations ===
With regenerative cooling, the pressure in the cooling channels is greater than the chamber pressure. The inner liner is under compression, while the outer wall of the engine is under significant hoop stresses.

The metal of the inner liner is greatly weakened by the high temperature, and also undergoes significant thermal expansion at the inner surface while the cold-side wall of the liner constrains the expansion. This sets up significant thermal stresses that can cause the inner surface to crack or craze after multiple firings particularly at the throat.

In addition the thin inner liner requires mechanical support to withstand the compressive loading due to the propellant's pressure; this support is usually provided by the side walls of the cooling channels and the backing plate. The inner liner is usually constructed of relatively high temperature, high thermal conductivity materials; traditionally copper or nickel based alloys have been used.

Several different manufacturing techniques can be used to create the complex geometry necessary for regenerative cooling. These include a corrugated metal sheet brazed between the inner and outer liner; hundreds of pipes brazed into the correct shape, or an inner liner with milled cooling channels and an outer liner around that. The geometry can also be created through direct metal 3D printing, as seen on some newer designs such as the SpaceX SuperDraco rocket engine.

== See also ==
- Regenerative cooling
- Expander cycle
