= Liquid-propellant rocket =

Rocket engine that uses liquid fuels and oxidizers

A simplified diagram of a liquid-propellant rocket.: 1. Liquid rocket fuel.; 2. Oxidizer.; 3. Pumps carry the fuel and oxidizer.; 4. The combustion chamber mixes and burns the two liquids.; 5. Combustion product gasses enter the nozzle through a throat.; 6. Exhaust exits the rocket.

A liquid-propellant rocket or liquid rocket uses a rocket engine burning liquid propellants. (Alternate approaches use gaseous or solid propellants.) Liquids are desirable propellants because they have reasonably high density and their combustion products have high specific impulse (I_{sp}). This allows the volume of the propellant tanks to be relatively low.

== Types ==
Liquid rockets can be monopropellant rockets using a single type of propellant, or bipropellant rockets using two types of propellant. Tripropellant rockets using three types of propellant are rare. Liquid oxidizer propellants are also used in hybrid rockets, with some of the advantages of a solid rocket. Bipropellant liquid rockets use a liquid fuel such as liquid hydrogen or RP-1, and a liquid oxidizer such as liquid oxygen. The engine may be a cryogenic rocket engine, where the fuel and oxidizer, such as hydrogen and oxygen, are gases which have been liquefied at very low temperatures.

Most designs of liquid rocket engines are throttleable for variable thrust operation. Some allow control of the propellant mixture ratio (ratio at which oxidizer and fuel are mixed). Some can be shut down and, with a suitable ignition system or self-igniting propellant, restarted.

Hybrid rockets apply a liquid or gaseous oxidizer to a solid fuel.

== Advantages and disadvantages ==
The use of liquid propellants has a number of advantages:

- A liquid rocket engine can be tested prior to use, whereas for a solid rocket motor a rigorous quality management must be applied during manufacturing to ensure high reliability.
- Liquid systems enable higher specific impulse than solids and hybrid rocket motors and can provide very high tankage efficiency.
- A liquid rocket engine can also usually be reused for several flights, as in the Space Shuttle and Falcon 9 series rockets, although reuse of solid rocket motors was also effectively demonstrated during the Shuttle program.
- The flow of propellant into the combustion chamber can be throttled, which allows for control over the magnitude of the thrust throughout the flight. This enables real-time error correction during the flight along with efficiency gains.
- Shutdown and restart capabilities allow for multiple burn cycles throughout a flight.
- In the case of an emergency, liquid propelled rockets can be shutdown in a controlled manner, which provides an extra level of safety and mission abort capability.

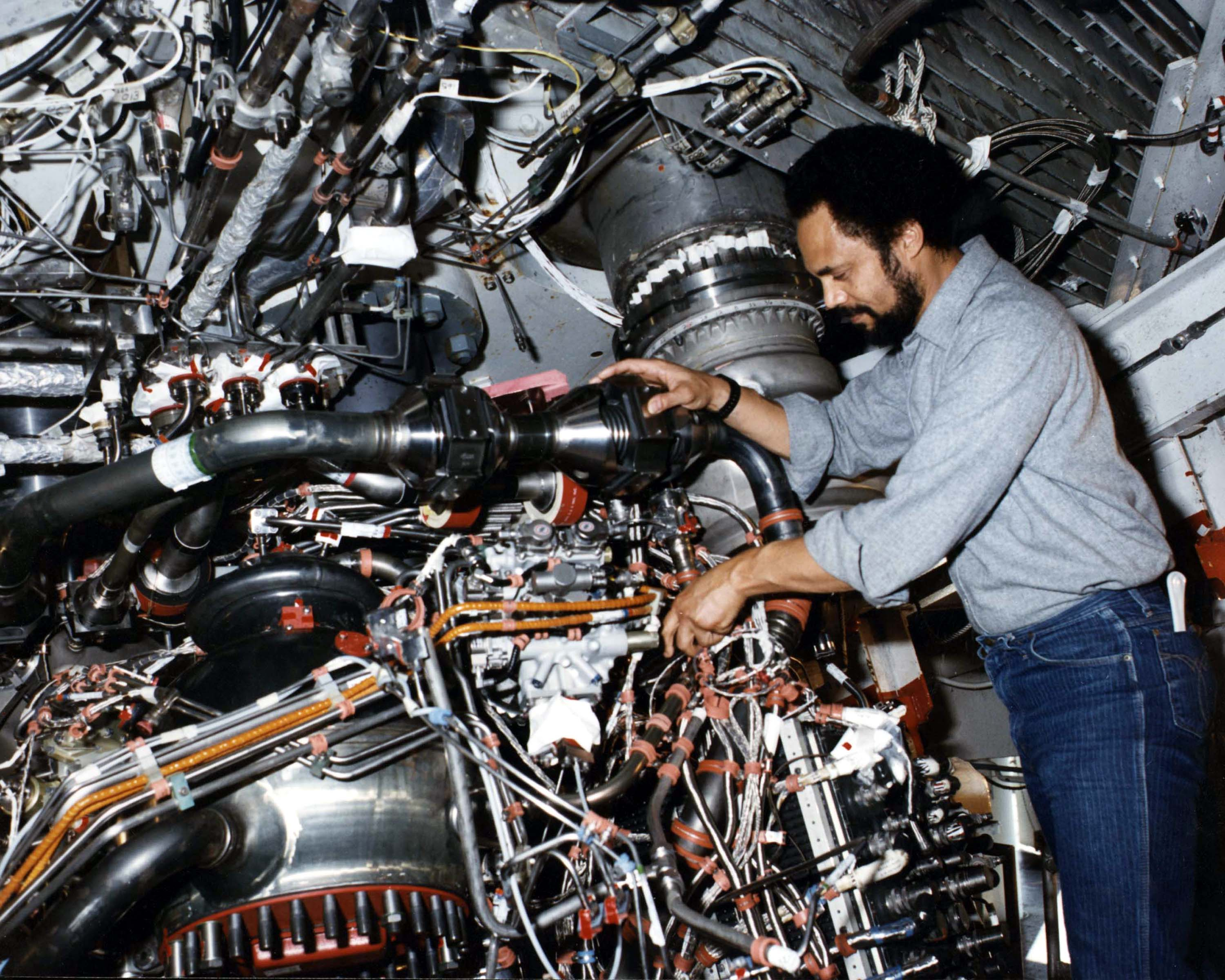
Bipropellant liquid rockets are simple in concept but due to high temperatures and high speed moving parts, very complex in practice.

Use of liquid propellants can also be associated with a number of issues:

- Because the propellant is a very large proportion of the mass of the vehicle, the center of mass shifts significantly rearward as the propellant is used; one will typically lose control of the vehicle if its center mass gets too close to the center of drag/pressure.
- When operated within an atmosphere, pressurization of the typically very thin-walled propellant tanks must guarantee positive gauge pressure at all times to avoid catastrophic collapse of the tank.
- Liquid propellants are subject to slosh, which has frequently led to loss of control of the vehicle. This can be controlled with slosh baffles in the tanks as well as judicious control laws in the guidance system.
- They can suffer from pogo oscillation where the rocket suffers from uncommanded cycles of acceleration.
- Liquid propellants often need ullage motors in zero-gravity or during staging to avoid sucking gas into engines at start up. They are also subject to vortexing within the tank, particularly towards the end of the burn, which can also result in gas being sucked into the engine or pump.
- Liquid propellants can leak, especially hydrogen, possibly leading to the formation of an explosive mixture.
- Turbopumps to pump liquid propellants are complex to design, and can suffer serious failure modes, such as overspeeding if they run dry or shedding fragments at high speed if metal particles from the manufacturing process enter the pump.
- Cryogenic propellants, such as liquid oxygen, freeze atmospheric water vapor into ice. This can damage or block seals and valves and can cause leaks and other failures. Avoiding this problem often requires lengthy chilldown procedures which attempt to remove as much of the vapor from the system as possible. Ice can also form on the outside of the tank, and later fall and damage the vehicle. External foam insulation can cause issues as shown by the Space Shuttle Columbia disaster. Non-cryogenic propellants do not cause such problems.
- Non-storable liquid rockets require considerable preparation immediately before launch. This makes them less practical than solid rockets for most weapon systems.

== Principle of operation ==
Liquid rocket engines have tankage and pipes to store and transfer propellant, an injector system and one or more combustion chambers with associated nozzles.

Typical liquid propellants have densities roughly similar to water, approximately 0.7 to 1.4 g/cm^{3} (0.025 to 0.051 lb/cu in). An exception is liquid hydrogen which has a much lower density, while requiring only relatively modest pressure to prevent vaporization. The density and low pressure of liquid propellants permit lightweight tankage: approximately 1% of the contents for dense propellants and around 10% for liquid hydrogen. The increased tank mass is due to liquid hydrogen's low density and the mass of the required insulation.

For injection into the combustion chamber, the propellant pressure at the injectors needs to be greater than the chamber pressure. This is often achieved with a pump. Suitable pumps usually use centrifugal turbopumps due to their high power and light weight, although reciprocating pumps have been employed in the past. Turbopumps are usually lightweight and can give excellent performance; with an on-Earth weight well under 1% of the thrust. Indeed, overall thrust to weight ratios including a turbopump have been as high as 155:1 with the SpaceX Merlin 1D rocket engine and up to 180:1 with the vacuum version. Instead of a pump, some designs use a tank of a high-pressure inert gas such as helium to pressurize the propellants. These rockets often provide lower delta-v because the mass of the pressurant tankage reduces performance. In some designs for high altitude or vacuum use the tankage mass can be acceptable.

The major components of a rocket engine are therefore the combustion chamber (thrust chamber), pyrotechnic igniter, propellant feed system, valves, regulators, propellant tanks and the rocket engine nozzle. For feeding propellants to the combustion chamber, liquid-propellant engines are either pressure-fed or pump-fed, with pump-fed engines working in a variety of engine cycles.

== Pressurization ==
Liquid propellants are often pumped into the combustion chamber with a lightweight centrifugal turbopump. Recently, some aerospace companies have used electric pumps with batteries. In simpler, small engines, an inert gas stored in a tank at a high pressure is sometimes used instead of pumps to force propellants into the combustion chamber. These engines may have a higher mass ratio, but are usually more reliable, and are therefore used widely in satellites for orbit maintenance.

== Propellants ==
Thousands of combinations of fuels and oxidizers have been tried over the years. Some of the more common and practical ones are:

=== Cryogenic ===
- Liquid oxygen (LOX, O_{2}) and liquid hydrogen (LH_{2}, H_{2}) – Space Shuttle main engines, Space Launch System core stage, Ariane 5 main stage and the Ariane 5 ECA second stage, the BE-3 of Blue Origin's New Shepard, the first and second stage of the Delta IV, the upper stages of the Ares I, Saturn V's second and third stages, Saturn IB, and Saturn I as well as Centaur rocket stage, the upper stages of the Long March 3, Long March 5, Long March 8, the first stage and second stage of the H-II, H-IIA, H-IIB, and the upper stage of the GSLV Mk-II and GSLV Mk-III. The main advantages of this mixture are a clean burn (water vapor is the only combustion product) and high performance.
- Liquid oxygen (LOX) and liquid methane (CH_{4}, liquefied natural gas, LNG) – the Raptor (SpaceX) and BE-4 (Blue Origin) engines. (See also Propulsion Cryogenics & Advanced Development project of NASA, and Project Morpheus.)

One of the most efficient mixtures, oxygen and hydrogen, suffers from the extremely low temperatures required for storing liquid hydrogen (around 20 K or −253.2 °C or −423.7 °F) and very low fuel density (70 kg/m^{3} or 4.4 lb/cu ft, compared to RP-1 at 820 kg/m^{3} or 51 lb/cu ft), necessitating large tanks that must also be lightweight and insulating. Lightweight foam insulation on the Space Shuttle external tank led to the Space Shuttle Columbia's destruction, as a piece broke loose, damaged its wing and caused it to break up on atmospheric reentry.

Liquid methane/LNG has several advantages over LH_{2}. Its performance (max. specific impulse) is lower than that of LH_{2} but higher than that of RP1 (kerosene) and solid propellants, and its higher density, similarly to other hydrocarbon fuels, provides higher thrust to volume ratios than LH_{2}, although its density is not as high as that of RP1. This makes it specially attractive for reusable launch systems because higher density allows for smaller motors, propellant tanks and associated systems. LNG also burns with less or no soot (less or no coking) than RP1, which eases reusability when compared with it, and LNG and RP1 burn cooler than LH_{2} so LNG and RP1 do not deform the interior structures of the engine as much. This means that engines that burn LNG can be reused more than those that burn RP1 or LH_{2}. Unlike engines that burn LH_{2}, both RP1 and LNG engines can be designed with a shared shaft with a single turbine and two turbopumps, one each for LOX and LNG/RP1. In space, LNG does not need heaters to keep it liquid, unlike RP1. LNG is less expensive, being readily available in large quantities. It can be stored for more prolonged periods of time, and is less explosive than LH_{2}.

=== Semi-cryogenic ===
- Liquid oxygen (LOX) and RP-1 (kerosene) – Saturn V's first stage, Zenit rocket, R-7-derived vehicles including Soyuz, Delta, Saturn I, and Saturn IB first stages, Titan I and Atlas rockets, Falcon 1 and Falcon 9, Long March 5, Long March 6, Long March 7 and Long March 8 first stages.
- Liquid oxygen (LOX) and alcohol (ethanol, C_{2}H_{5}OH) – early liquid rockets, like German (World War II) A4, aka V-2, and Redstone
- Liquid oxygen (LOX) and gasoline – Robert Goddard's first liquid rocket
- Liquid oxygen (LOX) and carbon monoxide (CO) – proposed for a Mars hopper vehicle (with a specific impulse of approximately 250 s), principally because carbon monoxide and oxygen can be straightforwardly produced by Zirconia electrolysis from the Martian atmosphere without requiring use of any of the Martian water resources to obtain Hydrogen.

=== Non-cryogenic/storable/hypergolic ===
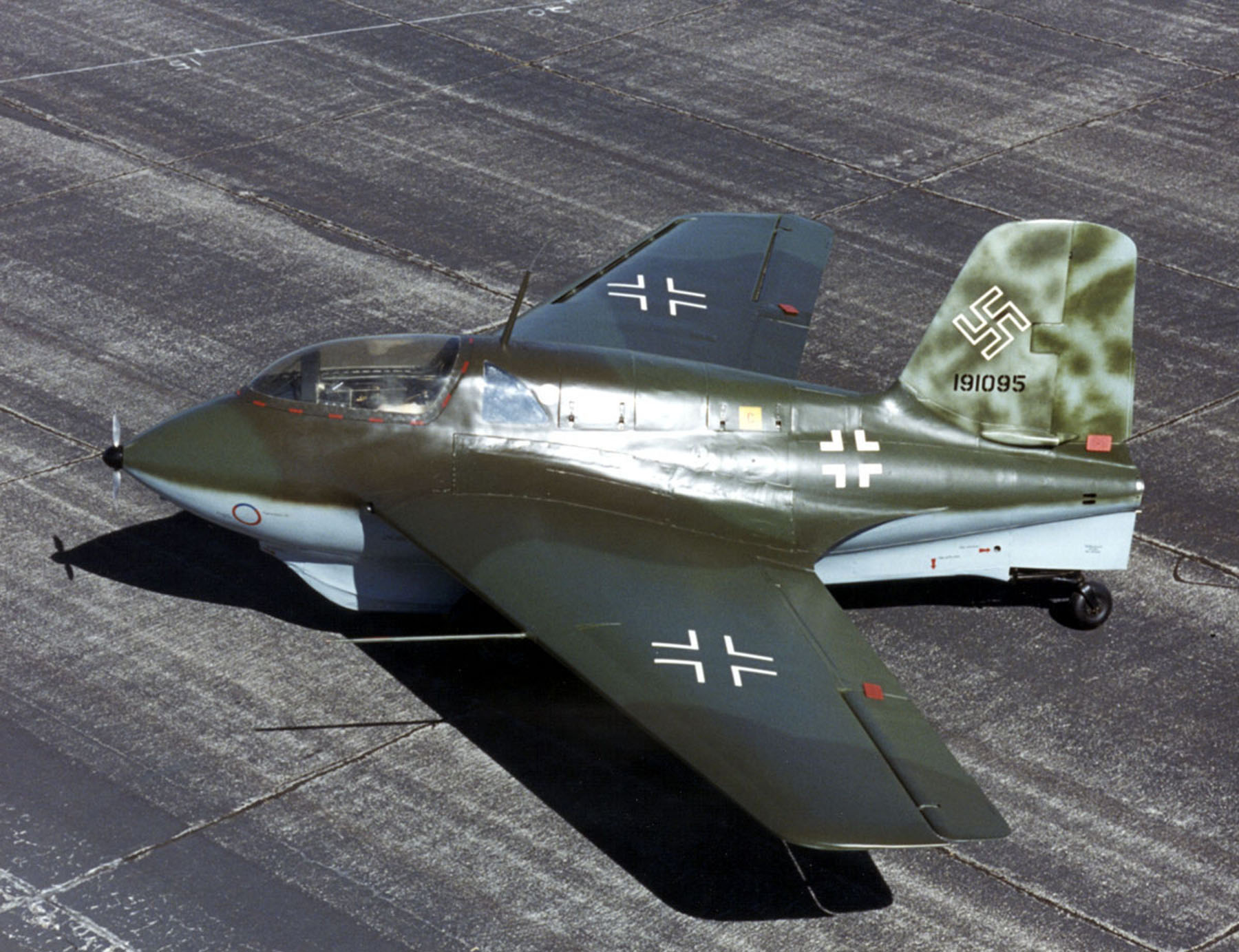
The NMUSAF's Me 163B Komet rocket plane

Many non-cryogenic bipropellants are hypergolic (self igniting).

- T-Stoff (80% hydrogen peroxide, H_{2}O_{2} as the oxidizer) and C-Stoff (methanol, CH_{3}OH, and hydrazine hydrate, N_{2}H_{4}·n(H_{2}O) as the fuel) – used for the Hellmuth-Walter-Werke HWK 109-509A, -B and -C engine family used on the Messerschmitt Me 163B Komet, an operational rocket fighter plane of World War II, and Ba 349 Natter crewed VTO interceptor prototypes.
- Nitric acid (HNO_{3}) and kerosene – Soviet BI-1 and MiG I-270 rocket fighter prototypes, Scud-A, aka SS-1 SRBM
- Inhibited red fuming nitric acid (IRFNA, HNO_{3} + N_{2}O_{4}) and unsymmetric dimethyl hydrazine (UDMH, (CH_{3})_{2}N_{2}H_{2}) – Soviet Scud-C, aka SS-1-c,-d,-e
- Nitric acid 73% with dinitrogen tetroxide 27% (AK27) and kerosene/gasoline mixture (TM-185) – various Russian (USSR) cold-war ballistic missiles (R-12, Scud-B,-D), Iran: Shahab-5, North Korea: Taepodong-2
- High-test peroxide (H_{2}O_{2}) and kerosene – UK (1970s) Black Arrow, USA Development (or study): BA-3200
- Hydrazine (N_{2}H_{4}) and red fuming nitric acid – MIM-3 Nike Ajax Anti-aircraft missile
- Unsymmetric dimethylhydrazine (UDMH) and dinitrogen tetroxide (N_{2}O_{4}) – Proton, Rokot, Long March 2 (used to launch Shenzhou crew vehicles.)
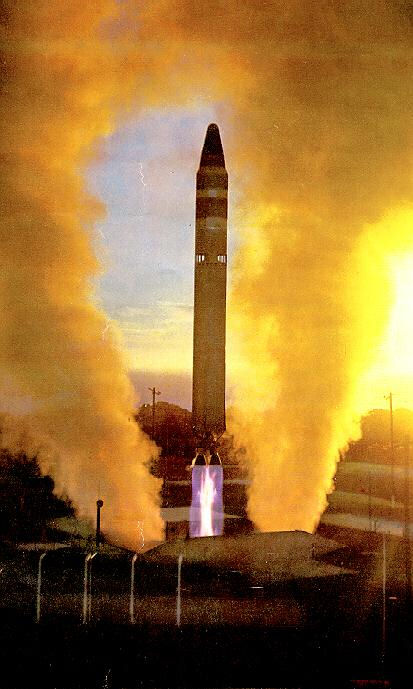
- Titan II
  Aerozine 50 (50% UDMH, 50% hydrazine) and dinitrogen tetroxide (N_{2}O_{4}) – Titans 2–4, Apollo lunar module, Apollo service module, interplanetary probes (Such as Voyager 1 and Voyager 2)
- Monomethylhydrazine (MMH, (CH_{3})HN_{2}H_{2}) and dinitrogen tetroxide (N_{2}O_{4}) – Space Shuttle orbiter's orbital maneuvering system (OMS) engines and Reaction control system (RCS) thrusters. SpaceX's Draco and SuperDraco engines for the Dragon spacecraft.

For storable ICBMs and most spacecraft, including crewed vehicles, planetary probes, and satellites, storing cryogenic propellants over extended periods is unfeasible due to evaporation, leading to loss of fuel, unless constantly provided with refrigeration or stored under extreme pressure, both unfeasible for such applications. Because of this, mixtures of hydrazine or its derivatives in combination with nitrogen oxides are generally used for such applications, but are toxic and carcinogenic. Consequently, to improve handling, some crew vehicles such as Dream Chaser and Space Ship Two plan to use hybrid rockets with non-toxic fuel and oxidizer combinations.

== Injectors ==
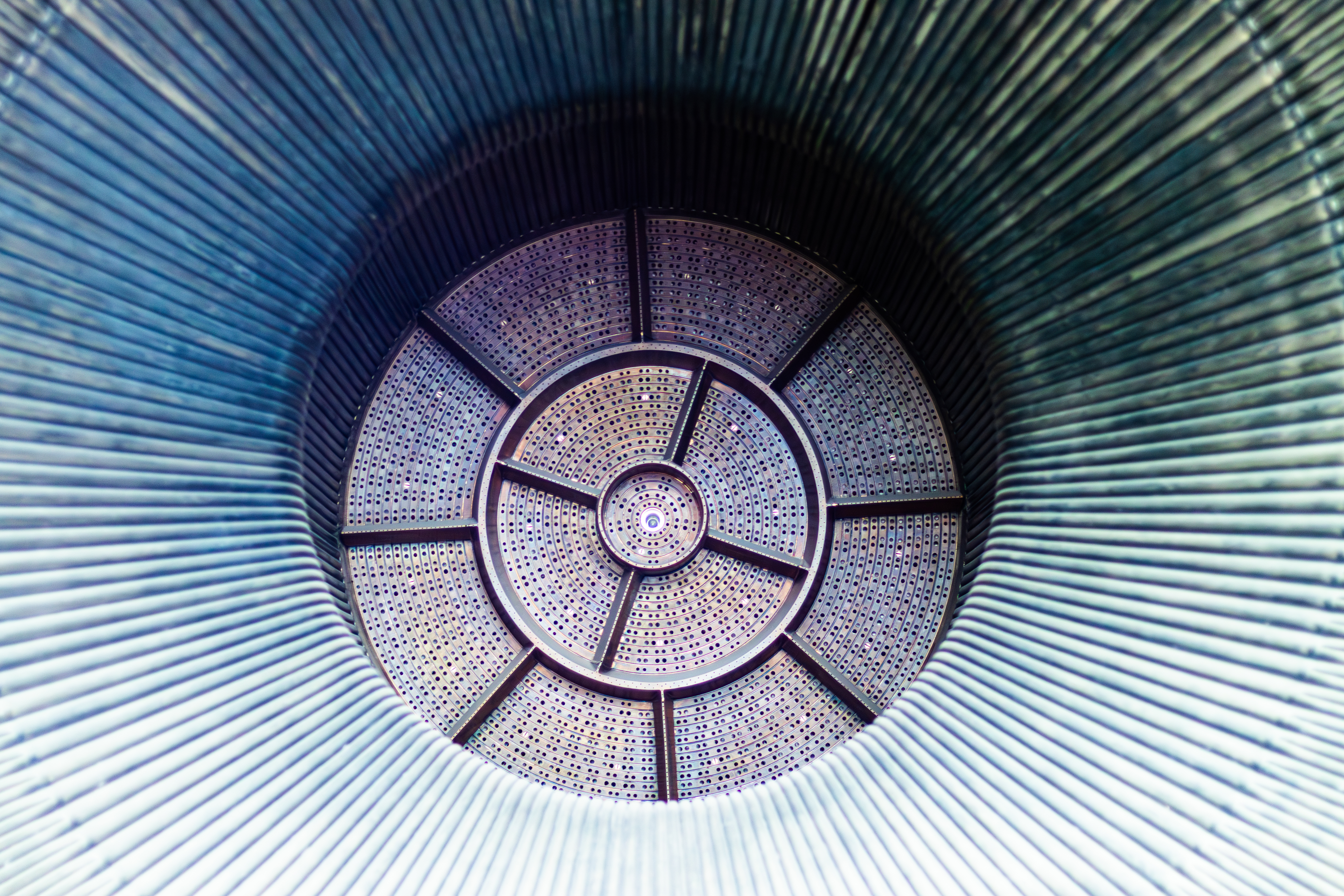
Rocketdyne F-1 rocket engine fuel injector

The injector implementation in liquid rockets determines the percentage of the theoretical performance of the nozzle that can be achieved. A poor injector performance causes unburnt propellant to leave the engine, giving poor efficiency.

Additionally, injectors are also usually key in reducing thermal loads on the nozzle; by increasing the proportion of fuel around the edge of the chamber, this gives much lower temperatures on the walls of the nozzle.

=== Types of injectors ===
Injectors can be as simple as a number of small diameter holes arranged in carefully constructed patterns through which the fuel and oxidizer travel. The speed of the flow is determined by the square root of the pressure drop across the injectors, the shape of the hole and other details such as the density of the propellant.

The first injectors used on the V-2 created parallel jets of fuel and oxidizer which then combusted in the chamber. This gave quite poor efficiency.

Injectors today classically consist of a number of small holes which aim jets of fuel and oxidizer so that they collide at a point in space a short distance away from the injector plate. This helps to break the flow up into small droplets that burn more easily.

The main types of injectors are

- Shower head
- Self-impinging doublet
- Cross-impinging triplet
- Centripetal or swirling
- Pintle

The pintle injector permits good mixture control of fuel and oxidizer over a wide range of flow rates. The pintle injector was used in the Apollo Lunar Module engines (Descent Propulsion System) and the Kestrel engine, it is currently used in the Merlin engine on Falcon 9 and Falcon Heavy rockets.

The RS-25 engine designed for the Space Shuttle uses a system of fluted posts, which use heated hydrogen from the preburner to vaporize the liquid oxygen flowing through the center of the posts and this improves the rate and stability of the combustion process; previous engines such as the F-1 used for the Apollo program had significant issues with oscillations that led to destruction of the engines, but this was not a problem in the RS-25 due to this design detail.

Valentin Glushko invented the centripetal injector in the early 1930s, and it has been almost universally used in Russian engines. Rotational motion is applied to the liquid (and sometimes the two propellants are mixed), then it is expelled through a small hole, where it forms a cone-shaped sheet that rapidly atomizes. Goddard's first liquid engine used a single impinging injector. German scientists in WWII experimented with impinging injectors on flat plates, used successfully in the Wasserfall missile.

=== Combustion stability ===
To avoid instabilities such as chugging, which is a relatively low speed oscillation, the engine must be designed with enough pressure drop across the injectors to render the flow largely independent of the chamber pressure. This pressure drop is normally achieved by using at least 20% of the chamber pressure across the injectors.

Nevertheless, particularly in larger engines, a high speed combustion oscillation is easily triggered, and these are not well understood. These high speed oscillations tend to disrupt the gas side boundary layer of the engine, and this can cause the cooling system to rapidly fail, destroying the engine. These kinds of oscillations are much more common on large engines, and plagued the development of the Saturn V, but were finally overcome.

Some combustion chambers, such as those of the RS-25 engine, use Helmholtz resonators as damping mechanisms to stop particular resonant frequencies from growing.

To prevent these issues the RS-25 injector design instead went to a lot of effort to vaporize the propellant prior to injection into the combustion chamber. Although many other features were used to ensure that instabilities could not occur, later research showed that these other features were unnecessary, and the gas phase combustion worked reliably.

Testing for stability often involves the use of small explosives. These are detonated within the chamber during operation, and causes an impulsive excitation. By examining the pressure trace of the chamber to determine how quickly the effects of the disturbance die away, it is possible to estimate the stability and redesign features of the chamber if required.

== Engine cycles ==
For liquid-propellant rockets, four different ways of powering the injection of the propellant into the chamber are in common use.

Fuel and oxidizer must be pumped into the combustion chamber against the pressure of the hot gasses being burned, and engine power is limited by the rate at which propellant can be pumped into the combustion chamber. For atmospheric or launcher use, high pressure, and thus high power, engine cycles are desirable to minimize gravity drag. For orbital use, lower power cycles are usually fine.

Pressure-fed cycle
The propellants are forced in from pressurised (relatively heavy) tanks. The heavy tanks mean that a relatively low pressure is optimal, limiting engine power, but all the fuel is burned, allowing high efficiency. The pressurant used is frequently helium due to its lack of reactivity and low density. Examples: AJ-10, used in the Space Shuttle OMS, Apollo SPS, and the second stage of the Delta II.
Electric pump-fed
An electric motor, generally a brushless DC electric motor, drives the pumps. The electric motor is powered by a battery pack. It is relatively simple to implement and reduces the complexity of the turbomachinery design, but at the expense of the extra dry mass of the battery pack. Example engine is the Rutherford designed and used by Rocket Lab.
Gas-generator cycle
A small percentage of the propellants are burnt in a preburner to power a turbopump and then exhausted through a separate nozzle, or low down on the main one. This results in a reduction in efficiency since the exhaust contributes little or no thrust, but the pump turbines can be very large, allowing for high power engines. Examples: Saturn V's F-1 and J-2, Delta IV's RS-68, Ariane 5's HM7B, Falcon 9's Merlin.
Tap-off cycle
Takes hot gases from the main combustion chamber of the rocket engine and routes them through engine turbopump turbines to pump propellant, then is exhausted. Since not all propellant flows through the main combustion chamber, the tap-off cycle is considered an open-cycle engine. Examples include the J-2S and BE-3.
Expander cycle
Cryogenic fuel (hydrogen, or methane) is used to cool the walls of the combustion chamber and nozzle. Absorbed heat vaporizes and expands the fuel which is then used to drive the turbopumps before it enters the combustion chamber, allowing for high efficiency, or is bled overboard, allowing for higher power turbopumps. The limited heat available to vaporize the fuel constrains engine power. Examples: RL10 for Atlas V and Delta IV second stages (closed cycle), H-II's LE-5 (bleed cycle).
Staged combustion cycle
A fuel- or oxidizer-rich mixture is burned in a preburner and then drives turbopumps, and this high-pressure exhaust is fed directly into the main chamber where the remainder of the fuel or oxidizer undergoes combustion, permitting very high pressures and efficiency. Examples: SSME, RD-191, LE-7.
Full-flow staged combustion cycle
Fuel- and oxidizer-rich mixtures are burned in separate preburners and drive the turbopumps, then both high-pressure exhausts, one oxygen rich and the other fuel rich, are fed directly into the main chamber where they combine and combust, permitting very high pressures and high efficiency. Example: SpaceX Raptor.

=== Engine cycle tradeoffs ===
Selecting an engine cycle is one of the earlier steps to rocket engine design. A number of tradeoffs arise from this selection, some of which include:

Tradeoff comparison among popular engine cycles
	Cycle type			
	Gas generator	Expander cycle	Staged-combustion	Pressure-fed
Advantages	Simple; low dry mass; allows for high power turbopumps for high thrust	High specific impulse; fairly low complexity	High specific impulse; high combustion chamber pressures allowing for high thrust	Simple; no turbopumps; low dry mass; high specific impulse
Disadvantages	Lower specific impulse	Must use cryogenic fuel; heat transfer to the fuel limits available power to the turbine and thus engine thrust	Greatly increased complexity &, therefore, mass (more-so for full-flow)	Tank pressure limits combustion chamber pressure and thrust; heavy tanks and associated pressurization hardware

== Cooling ==
Injectors are commonly laid out so that a fuel-rich layer is created at the combustion chamber wall. This reduces the temperature there, and downstream to the throat and even into the nozzle and permits the combustion chamber to be run at higher pressure, which permits a higher expansion ratio nozzle to be used which gives a higher I_{SP} and better system performance. A liquid rocket engine often employs regenerative cooling, which uses the fuel or less commonly the oxidizer to cool the chamber and nozzle.

== Ignition ==
Ignition can be performed in many ways, but perhaps more so with liquid propellants than other rockets a consistent and significant ignitions source is required; a delay of ignition (in some cases as small as a few tens of milliseconds) can cause overpressure of the chamber due to excess propellant. A hard start can even cause an engine to explode.

Generally, ignition systems try to apply flames across the injector surface, with a mass flow of approximately 1% of the full mass flow of the chamber.

Safety interlocks are sometimes used to ensure the presence of an ignition source before the main valves open; however reliability of the interlocks can in some cases be lower than the ignition system. Thus it depends on whether the system must fail safe, or whether overall mission success is more important. Interlocks are rarely used for upper, uncrewed stages where failure of the interlock would cause loss of mission, but are present on the RS-25 engine, to shut the engines down prior to liftoff of the Space Shuttle. In addition, detection of successful ignition of the igniter is surprisingly difficult, some systems use thin wires that are cut by the flames, pressure sensors have also seen some use.

Methods of ignition include pyrotechnic, electrical (spark or hot wire), and chemical. Hypergolic propellants have the advantage of self igniting, reliably and with less chance of hard starts. In the 1940s, the Russians began to start engines with hypergols, to then switch over to the primary propellants after ignition. This was also used on the American F-1 rocket engine on the Apollo program.

Ignition with a pyrophoric agent: Triethylaluminium ignites on contact with air and will ignite and/or decompose on contact with water, and with any other oxidizer—it is one of the few substances sufficiently pyrophoric to ignite on contact with cryogenic liquid oxygen. The enthalpy of combustion, Δ_{c}H°, is −5,105.70 ± 2.90 kJ/mol (−1,220.29 ± 0.69 kcal/mol). Its easy ignition makes it particularly desirable as a rocket engine ignitor. May be used in conjunction with triethylborane to create triethylaluminum-triethylborane, better known as TEA-TEB.

== History ==
=== Russia–Soviet Union ===
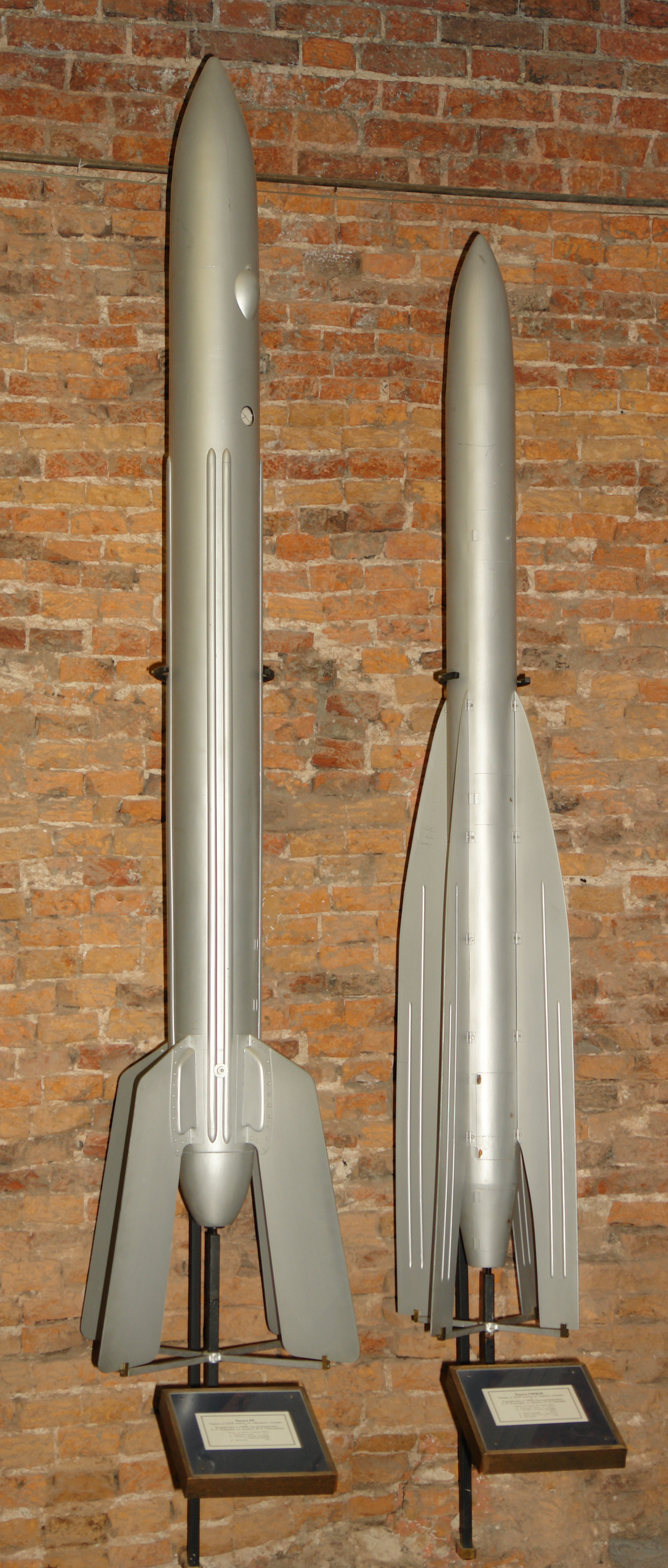
Rocket 09 (left) and 10 (GIRD-09 and GIRD-X). Museum of Cosmonautics and Rocket Technology; St. Petersburg.

The idea of a liquid-fueled rocket as understood in the modern context first appeared in 1903 in the book Exploration of the Universe with Rocket-Propelled Vehicles by the Russian rocket scientist Konstantin Tsiolkovsky. The magnitude of his contribution to astronautics is astounding, including the Tsiolkovsky rocket equation, multi-staged rockets, and using liquid oxygen and liquid hydrogen in liquid propellant rockets. Tsiolkovsky influenced later rocket scientists throughout Europe, like Wernher von Braun. Soviet search teams at Peenemünde found a German translation of a book by Tsiolkovsky of which "almost every page...was embellished by von Braun's comments and notes." Leading Soviet rocket-engine designer Valentin Glushko and rocket designer Sergey Korolev studied Tsiolkovsky's works as youths and both sought to turn Tsiolkovsky's theories into reality.

From 1929 to 1930 in Leningrad Glushko pursued rocket research at the Gas Dynamics Laboratory (GDL), where a new research section was set up for the study of liquid-propellant and electric rocket engines. This resulted in the creation of ORM (from "Experimental Rocket Motor" in Russian) engines ORM-1 to ORM-52. A total of 100 bench tests of liquid-propellant rockets were conducted using various types of fuel, both low and high-boiling and thrust up to 300 kg was achieved.

During this period in Moscow, Fredrich Tsander – a scientist and inventor – was designing and building liquid rocket engines which ran on compressed air and gasoline. Tsander investigated high-energy fuels including powdered metals mixed with gasoline. In September 1931 Tsander formed the Moscow based 'Group for the Study of Reactive Motion', better known by its Russian acronym "GIRD". In May 1932, Sergey Korolev replaced Tsander as the head of GIRD. On 17 August 1933, Mikhail Tikhonravov launched the first Soviet liquid-propelled rocket (the GIRD-9), fueled by liquid oxygen and jellied gasoline. It reached an altitude of 400 metres (1,300 ft). In January 1933 Tsander began development of the GIRD-X rocket. This design burned liquid oxygen and gasoline and was one of the first engines to be regeneratively cooled by the liquid oxygen, which flowed around the inner wall of the combustion chamber before entering it. Problems with burn-through during testing prompted a switch from gasoline to less energetic alcohol. The final missile, 2.2 metres (7.2 ft) long by 140 millimetres (5.5 in) in diameter, had a mass of 30 kilograms (66 lb), and it was anticipated that it could carry a 2 kilograms (4.4 lb) payload to an altitude of 5.5 kilometres (3.4 mi). The GIRD X rocket was launched on 25 November 1933 and flew to a height of 80 meters.

In 1933 GDL and GIRD merged and became the Reactive Scientific Research Institute (RNII). At RNII Gushko continued the development of liquid propellant rocket engines ОРМ-53 to ОРМ-102, with ORM-65 powering the RP-318 rocket-powered aircraft. In 1938 Leonid Dushkin replaced Glushko and continued development of the ORM engines, including the engine for the rocket powered interceptor, the Bereznyak-Isayev BI-1. At RNII Tikhonravov worked on developing oxygen/alcohol liquid-propellant rocket engines. Ultimately liquid propellant rocket engines were given a low priority during the late 1930s at RNII, however the research was productive and very important for later achievements of the Soviet rocket program.

=== Peru ===
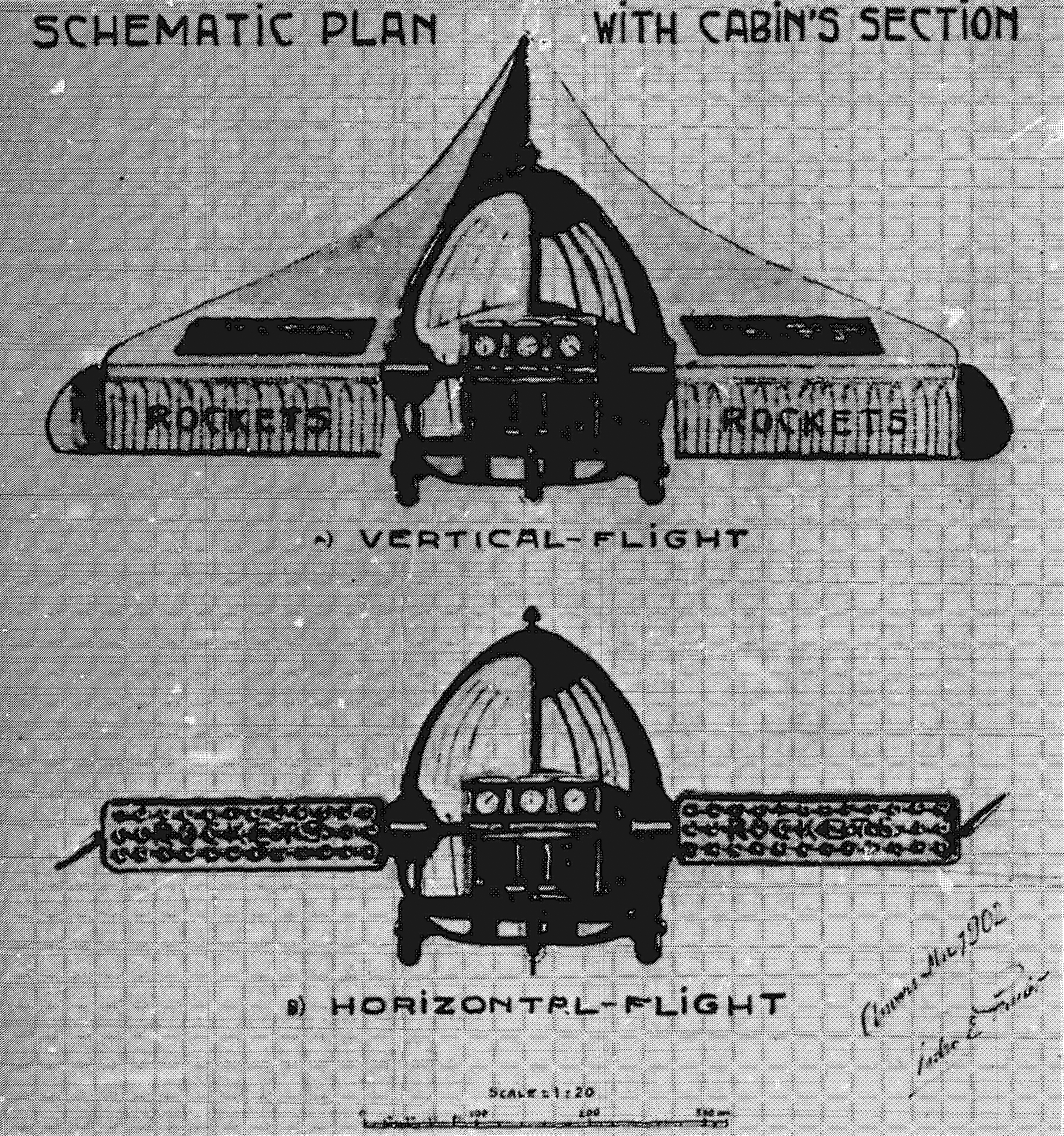
Pedro Paulet's Avion Torpedo of 1902, featuring a canopy fixed to a delta tiltwing for horizontal or vertical flight.

Peruvian Pedro Paulet, who had experimented with rockets throughout his life in Peru, wrote a letter to El Comercio in Lima in 1927, claiming he had experimented with a liquid rocket engine while he was a student in Paris three decades earlier. Historians of early rocketry experiments, among them Max Valier, Willy Ley, and John D. Clark, have given differing amounts of credence to Paulet's report. Valier applauded Paulet's liquid-propelled rocket design in the Verein für Raumschiffahrt publication Die Rakete, saying the engine had "amazing power" and that his plans were necessary for future rocket development. Hermann Oberth would name Paulet as a pioneer in rocketry in 1965. Wernher von Braun would also describe Paulet as "the pioneer of the liquid fuel propulsion motor" and stated that "Paulet helped man reach the Moon". Paulet was later approached by Nazi Germany, being invited to join the Astronomische Gesellschaft to help develop rocket technology, though he refused to assist after discovering that the project was destined for weaponization and never shared the formula for his propellant. According to filmmaker and researcher Álvaro Mejía, Frederick I. Ordway III would later attempt to discredit Paulet's discoveries in the context of the Cold War and in an effort to shift the public image of von Braun away from his history with Nazi Germany.

=== United States ===
Robert H. Goddard, bundled against the cold New England weather of March 16, 1926, holds the launching frame of his most notable invention — the first liquid rocket.

The first flight of a liquid-propellant rocket took place on March 16, 1926 at Auburn, Massachusetts, when American professor Dr. Robert H. Goddard launched a vehicle using liquid oxygen and gasoline as propellants. The rocket, which was dubbed "Nell", rose just 41 feet during a 2.5-second flight that ended in a cabbage field, but it was an important demonstration that rockets using liquid propulsion were possible. Goddard proposed liquid propellants about fifteen years earlier and began to seriously experiment with them in 1921. The German-Romanian Hermann Oberth published a book in 1923 suggesting the use of liquid propellants.

=== Germany ===
In Germany, engineers and scientists became enthralled with liquid propulsion, building and testing them in the late 1920s within Opel RAK, the world's first rocket program, in Rüsselsheim. According to Max Valier's account, Opel RAK rocket designer, Friedrich Wilhelm Sander launched two liquid-fuel rockets at Opel Rennbahn in Rüsselsheim on April 10 and April 12, 1929. These Opel RAK rockets have been the first European, and after Goddard the world's second, liquid-fuel rockets in history. In his book "Raketenfahrt" Valier describes the size of the rockets as of 21 cm in diameter and with a length of 74 cm, weighing 7 kg empty and 16 kg with fuel. The maximum thrust was 45 to 50 kp, with a total burning time of 132 seconds. These properties indicate a gas pressure pumping. The main purpose of these tests was to develop the liquid rocket-propulsion system for a Gebrüder-Müller-Griessheim aircraft under construction for a planned flight across the English channel. Also spaceflight historian Frank H. Winter, curator at National Air and Space Museum in Washington, DC, confirms the Opel group was working, in addition to their solid-fuel rockets used for land-speed records and the world's first crewed rocket-plane flights with the Opel RAK.1, on liquid-fuel rockets. By May 1929, the engine produced a thrust of 200 kg (440 lb.) "for longer than fifteen minutes and in July 1929, the Opel RAK collaborators were able to attain powered phases of more than thirty minutes for thrusts of 300 kg (660-lb.) at Opel's works in Rüsselsheim," again according to Max Valier's account. The Great Depression brought an end to the Opel RAK activities. After working for the German military in the early 1930s, Sander was arrested by Gestapo in 1935, when private rocket-engineering became forbidden in Germany. He was convicted of treason to 5 years in prison and forced to sell his company, he died in 1938. Max Valier's (via Arthur Rudolph and Heylandt), who died while experimenting in 1930, and Friedrich Sander's work on liquid-fuel rockets was confiscated by the German military, the Heereswaffenamt and integrated into the activities under General Walter Dornberger in the early and mid-1930s in a field near Berlin. Max Valier was a co-founder of an amateur research group, the VfR, working on liquid rockets in the early 1930s, and many of whose members eventually became important rocket technology pioneers, including Wernher von Braun. Von Braun served as head of the army research station that designed the V-2 rocket weapon for the Nazis.

Drawing of the He 176 V1 prototype rocket aircraft

By the late 1930s, use of rocket propulsion for crewed flight began to be seriously experimented with, as Germany's Heinkel He 176 made the first crewed rocket-powered flight using a liquid rocket engine, designed by German aeronautics engineer Hellmuth Walter on June 20, 1939. The only production rocket-powered combat aircraft ever to see military service, the Me 163 Komet in 1944-45, also used a Walter-designed liquid rocket engine, the Walter HWK 109-509, which produced up to 1,700 kgf (16.7 kN) thrust at full power.

=== Post World War II ===
After World War II the American government and military finally seriously considered liquid-propellant rockets as weapons and began to fund work on them. The Soviet Union did likewise, and thus began the Space Race.

In 2010s 3D printed engines started being used for spaceflight. Examples of such engines include SuperDraco used in launch escape system of the SpaceX Dragon 2 and also engines used for first or second stages in launch vehicles from Astra, Orbex, Relativity Space, Skyrora, or Launcher.

== See also ==
- Comparison of orbital launch systems
- Comparison of orbital launchers families
- Comparison of orbital rocket engines
- Comparison of solid-fuelled orbital launch systems
- List of space launch system designs
- List of missiles
- List of orbital launch systems
- List of sounding rockets
- List of military rockets
- Space Propulsion Test Facility in Perdasdefogu

== Sources cited ==
- Baker, David; Zak, Anatoly (9 September 2013). Race for Space 1: Dawn of the Space Age. RHK.
- Chertok, Boris (2005). Rockets and People Volumes 1-4. National Aeronautics and Space Administration.
- Mejía, Álvaro (2017). "Pedro Paulet, sabio multidisciplinario". Persona & Cultura (in Spanish). 14 (14). Universidad Católica San Pablo: 95–122. doi:10.36901/persona.v14i14.209. S2CID 258143557.
- Siddiqi, Asif (2000). Challenge to Apollo : the Soviet Union and the space race, 1945-1974 (PDF). Washington, D.C.: National Aeronautics and Space Administration, NASA History Div.
