= Gas-generator cycle =

Rocket engine operation method

Gas-generator rocket cycle. Some of the fuel and oxidizer is burned separately to power the pumps and then discarded. Most gas-generator engines use the fuel for nozzle cooling.

The gas-generator cycle, also referred to as the GG cycle, is one of the most commonly used engine cycles in bipropellant liquid rocket engines.

Propellant is burned in a gas generator (analogous to, but distinct from, a preburner in a staged combustion cycle) and the resulting hot gas is used to power the propellant pumps before being exhausted overboard and lost. Because of this loss, this type of engine is considered an open cycle (note other open cycles exist, e.g. the tap-off cycle or the expander bleed cycle).

The gas generator cycle exhaust products pass over the turbine's wheel(s) first. Then they are expelled overboard. They can be expelled directly from the turbine, or are sometimes expelled into the nozzle (downstream from the throat) for both a small gain in efficiency, and can serve as film cooling. An advantage of this cycle is the high pressure drop available to the turbine (GG chamber pressure down to ambient) for extracting work from the drive gas; at the cost of needing to be sparing with the total mass flow. For this reason, turbines in GG cycles are commonly of the impulse type, rather than the reaction turbines common in staged combustion cycles.

The main combustion chamber does not use these products. This explains the name of the open cycle. The major disadvantage is that this propellant contributes little to no thrust because it is not injected into the combustion chamber. The major advantage of the cycle is reduced engineering complexity compared to the staged combustion (closed) cycle.

== Examples ==
- RD-107, RD-108—Soviet engine type developed in the 1950s, used on R-7 family vehicles including the active Soyuz-2.
- F-1—RP-1/LOX engine used on the first stage of Saturn V. Most powerful single combustion chamber liquid-fueled engine ever flown.
- J-2—Upper stage LH2/LOX engine developed in the 1960s and used on Saturn V.
- RS-27A—American RP-1/LOX engine first flown in 1990.
- Vulcain—A family of European first stage engines using LH2/LOX flown on Ariane 5 and Ariane 6.
- Merlin—RP-1/LOX engine developed by SpaceX for Falcon 9 and Falcon Heavy, used on both first and second stages.
- RS-68—LH2/LOX engine built in the 1990s by Aerojet Rocketdyne. Largest hydrogen-fueled rocket engine ever flown.
- CE-20—Indian LH2/LOX engine developed in the 2010s for use on the LVM3 launch vehicle.
- YF-20—Chinese N_{2}O_{4}/UDMH engine developed in the 1990s and used on Long March 2, 3, and 4.
- TQ-12—LCH4/LOX engine developed by LandSpace. First flew in 2022 on Zhuque-2.

== See also ==
- Combustion tap-off cycle
- Expander cycle
- Pressure-fed engine
- Rocket engine
- Staged combustion cycle
- Turbopump
