= Comparison of orbital rocket engines =

This page is an incomplete list of orbital rocket engine data and specifications.

== Current, upcoming, and in-development rocket engines ==
Engine	Origin	Designer	Vehicle	Status	Use	Propellant	Power cycle	Specific impulse (s) (Note: At sea level if denoted SL, in vacuum otherwise)	Thrust (N)	Chamber pressure (bar)	Mass (kg)	Thrust:weight ratio (Note: Weight is calculated at standard gravity.)	Oxidizer:fuel ratio
Aeon-R	USA	Relativity Space	Terran R	Development	1st, 2nd	CH_{4} / LOX	Gas generator		1,147,000				
AJ10-190	USA	Aerojet	Space Shuttle, Orion, Apollo CSM	Active	Upper	N_{2}O_{4} / MMH	Pressure-fed	316	26,689	8.62	118	23.08	
Aquila SL	Germany	Isar Aerospace	Spectrum	Development	1st	C_{3}H_{8} / LOX	Gas generator		75,000				
Aquila VAC	Germany	Isar Aerospace	Spectrum	Development	2nd	C_{3}H_{8} / LOX	Gas generator		94,000				
Archimedes	New Zealand USA	Rocket Lab	Neutron	Development	1st, 2nd	CH_{4} / LOX	Staged, oxidizer-rich		730,000				
BE-3U	USA	Blue Origin	New Glenn	Active	2nd	LH_{2} / LOX	Expander, open	445	941,500			>90	
BE-4	USA	Blue Origin	New Glenn, Vulcan	Active	1st	CH_{4} / LOX	Staged, oxidizer-rich	340	2,846,900	138			
BE-7	USA	Blue Origin	Blue Moon	Development	1st	LH_{2} / LOX	Expander, open		44,500				5.5-7.1
CE-20	India	LPSC	GSLV Mk III	Active	Upper	LH_{2} / LOX	Gas generator	434	196,500	60.00	588	34.1	5.05
CE-7.5	India	LPSC	GSLV Mk II	Active	Upper	LH_{2} / LOX	Staged, fuel-rich	454	73,500	58	445	16.85	
E2	USA	ABL Space Systems	RS1	Active	1st	RP-1 / LOX // Jet-A / LOX	Gas generator		53,800	64			
E2 Vacuum	USA	ABL Space Systems	RS1	Active	2nd	RP-1 / LOX // Jet-A / LOX	Gas generator		57,800				
Engine-2	USA	Vast	TBA	Development	1st	RP-1 / LOX	Staged, oxidizer-rich	327; 290 (SL)	100,000	100			2.62
Engine-2 Vacuum	USA	Vast	TBA	Development	2nd	RP-1 / LOX	Staged, oxidizer-rich	365	100,000				2.62
GEM 63	USA	Northrop Grumman	Atlas V	Active	Booster	HTPB	Solid fuel	279.06	1,662,745		49,300 with fuel		
GEM 63XL	USA	Northrop Grumman	Vulcan	Active	Booster	HTPB	Solid fuel	280.3	2,025,720		53,400 with fuel		
Hadley	USA	Ursa Major Technologies	Rocket 4	Active	2nd	RP-1 / LOX	Staged, oxidizer-rich		22,241 (SL)	62			
Helix	Germany	Rocket Factory Augsburg	RFA One	Development	1st, 2nd	RP-1 / LOX	Staged, oxidizer-rich	350, 325 (SL)	100,000	100			
HyPER-15	South Korea	Innospace	Hanbit-Nano, -Micro, -Mini	Development	1st	Paraffin / LOX	Electric pump	292	150,000				
LE-5B-3	Japan	Mitsubishi, JAXA	H-3	Active	Upper	LH_{2} / LOX	Expander, open	447	137,000	36.0	269	51.93	5
LE-9	Japan	Mitsubishi, JAXA	H-3	Active	1st	LH_{2} / LOX	Expander, open	425	1,471,000	100	2,400	62.5	5.9
Lightning 1	USA	Firefly Aerospace	Alpha	Active	2nd	RP-1 / LOX	Combustion tap-off	322	70,100				
M10	Europe	Avio	Vega-E	Development	Upper	CH_{4} / LOX	Expander, closed	362	98,000				3.4
Merlin 1D FT	USA	SpaceX	Falcon 9 B5, Heavy	Active	1st	RP-1 / LOX	Gas generator	311	914,000; 845,000 (SL)	108.0	470	194.5	
Merlin Vacuum 1D	USA	SpaceX	Falcon 9 B5, Heavy	Active	2nd	RP-1 / LOX	Gas generator	348	981,000				2.36
Miranda	USA	Firefly Aerospace	Antares 300 Series, MLV	Development	1st	RP-1 / LOX	Combustion tap-off	305	1,023,000				
NK-33A (AJ26-62), 11Д111 / 14Д15	USSR	JSC Kuznetsov	Antares 100, Soyuz-2-1v	Retired	1st	RP-1 / LOX	Staged, oxidizer-rich	331; 297 (SL)	1,680,000; 1,510,000 (SL)	145	1,222	136.8	
P120	Italy France	Avio	Ariane 6, Vega-C	Active	Booster, 1st	HTPB	Solid fuel	279	4,650,000	105	153,000 with fuel		
Raptor	USA	SpaceX	Starship	Development	1st, 2nd	CH_{4} / LOX	Staged, full-flow	350; 327 (SL)	2,750,000 (SL)	350	1,525	184	3.6
Raptor Vacuum	USA	SpaceX	Starship	Development	2nd	CH_{4} / LOX	Staged, full-flow	380 est.	>2,750,000	350	>1,525	<184	3.6
RD-0124, 14Д23	Russia	KBKhA	Soyuz-2.1b, Soyuz-2-1v, Angara	Active	2nd, 3rd	RP-1 / LOX	Staged, oxidizer-rich	359	294,300	160	520	57.7	
RD-0146D	Russia	KBKhA	Angara	Development	Upper	LH_{2} / LOX	Expander, closed	470	68,600	59			
RD-107A, 14Д22	Russia	NPO Energomash	Soyuz-FG, -2	Active	1st	RP-1 / LOX	Gas generator	320.2; 263.3 (SL)	1,019,892; 839,449 (SL)	61.2	1,090	78.53	
RD-108A, 14Д21	Russia	NPO Energomash	Soyuz-FG, -2	Active	2nd	RP-1 / LOX	Gas generator	320.6; 257.7 (SL)	921,825; 792,377 (SL)	55.5	1,075	75.16	
RD-171M, (Note: Most powerful multi-chamber rocket engine in the world) 11Д520	Russia	NPO Energomash	Soyuz-5, Zenit-2M, -3SL, -3SLB, -3SLBF	Active	1st	RP-1 / LOX	Staged, oxidizer-rich	337.2; 309.5 (SL)	7,904,160; 7,256,921 (SL)	250	9,300	79.57	
RD-180	Russia	NPO Energomash	Atlas V, III	Active	1st	RP-1 / LOX	Staged, oxidizer-rich	338.4; 311.9 (SL)	4,152,136; 3,826,555 (SL)	261.7	5,480	71.2	2.72
RD-191	Russia	NPO Energomash	Angara	Active	1st	RP-1 / LOX	Staged, oxidizer-rich	337.5; 311.2 (SL)	2,084,894; 1,922,103 (SL)	262.6	2,200	89.09	
RD-276, 14Д14М	Russia	NPO Energomash	Proton-M	Active	1st	N_{2}O_{4} / UDMH	Staged, oxidizer-rich	315.8; 288 (SL)	1,831,882; 1,671,053 (SL)	168.5	1,120	171.2	
RD-801	Ukraine	Pivdenne/Pivdenmash	Mayak	Development	1st	RP-1 / LOX	Staged, oxidizer-rich	336; 300.7 (SL)	1,339,255; 1,198,608 (SL)	180	1,630		2.65
RD-809K	Ukraine	Pivdenne/Pivdenmash	Mayak	Development	Upper	RP-1 / LOX	Staged, oxidizer-rich	352	98,067		330		2.62
RD-810	Ukraine	Pivdenne/Pivdenmash	Mayak, Zenit	Development	1st	RP-1 / LOX	Staged, oxidizer-rich	335.5; 299 (SL)	2,104,890; 1,876,149 (SL)	180	2,800		2.65
RD-861K	Ukraine	Pivdenne/Pivdenmash	Cyclone-4M	Development	2nd	N_{2}O_{4} / UDMH	Gas generator	330	77,629		207		2.41
RD-870	Ukraine	Pivdenne/Pivdenmash	Cyclone-4M	Development	1st	RP-1 / LOX	Staged, oxidizer-rich	340; 301.5 (SL)	876,715; 777,667 (SL)		1,353		2.684
Reaver 1	USA	Firefly Aerospace	Alpha	Active	1st	RP-1 / LOX	Combustion tap-off	265 (SL) 295.6	184,000	75			
RL10A-4-2	USA	Aerojet Rocketdyne	Atlas IIIB, V	Retired	Upper	LH_{2} / LOX	Expander, closed	451	99,195	42	168	60.27	5.5
RL10B-2	USA	Aerojet Rocketdyne	Delta III, IV, SLS	Active	Upper	LH_{2} / LOX	Expander, closed	465.5	110,093	44	301	37.27	5.88
RL10C-1	USA	Aerojet Rocketdyne	Delta III, IV, SLS, Vulcan	Active	Upper	LH_{2} / LOX	Expander, closed	450	101,820	44	191	54.5	5.5
RS-25	USA	Rocketdyne	Space Shuttle, SLS	Active	1st	LH_{2} / LOX	Staged, fuel-rich	452.3; 366 (SL)	2,279,000; 1,860,000 (SL)	206.4	3,526	53.79	
RS-88 LAE	USA	Rocketdyne	Boeing Starliner	Active	Upper	MMH / NTO	Gas generator		176,600 (SL)				
Rutherford	New Zealand USA	Rocket Lab	Electron	Active	1st	RP-1 / LOX	Electric pump	311	24,900; 25,000 (SL)	55	35	72.8 (SL)	
Rutherford Vacuum	New Zealand USA	Rocket Lab	Electron	Active	2nd	RP-1 / LOX	Electric pump	343	25,800				
S139	India	SDSC	PSLV	Active	1st	HTPB	Solid fuel	269	4,860,000	58	160,200 with fuel		
S200	India	SDSC	GSLV Mk III	Active	Booster	HTPB	Solid fuel	274.5	5,150,000		207,000 with fuel		
SCE-200	India	LPSC	GSLV Mk III, ULV	Development	Upper, main	RP-1 / LOX	Staged, oxidizer-rich	335; 299 (SL)	2,030,000; 1,820,000 (SL)	180	2,700		
Sirius	Australia	Gilmour Space	Eris	Development	Booster		Hybrid		150,000				
SLS Solid Rocket Booster (Note: Largest, most powerful solid-fuel rocket motor ever built)	USA	Orbital ATK	SLS	Active	Booster	PBAN	Solid fuel	267	16,000,000		730,000 with fuel		
SLV-1	India	Godrej & Boyce	PSLV	Active	Booster	HTPB	Solid fuel	253	502,600	43	10,800 with fuel		
SRB-A3	Japan	IHI Aerospace, JAXA	H-IIA, H-IIB, Epsilon	Active	Booster	HTPB	Solid fuel	283.6	2,305,000; 2,150,000 (SL)	111	76,600 with fuel		
TEPREL-B	Spain	PLD Space	Miura 1	Active	1st	RP-1 / LOX	Pressure-fed		30,200 (SL)				
TEPREL-C	Spain	PLD Space	Miura 5	Development	1st, 2nd	RP-1 / LOX	Gas generator		190,000 (SL)				
TQ-12	China	Landspace	ZQ-2	Active	1st	CH_{4} / LOX	Gas generator	284	667,000 (SL)	101			
Vikas (rocket engine)	India	LPSC	PSLV, GSLV, GSLV Mk III	Active	2nd, main, booster	N_{2}O_{4} / UDMH	Gas generator	262	680,500–804,500; 600,500–756,500 (SL)	53.0–58.5			
Vinci	Europe	Snecma	Ariane 6	Active	Upper	LH_{2} / LOX	Expander, closed	457	180,000	60	280	65.60	6.1
Vulcain 2.1	Europe	Snecma	Ariane 6	Active	1st	LH_{2} / LOX	Gas generator		1,324,000	120.8	2,000	66.2	
YF-21B	China	AALPT	Long March 2E, 2F, 3	Active	Booster, 1st	N_{2}O_{4} / UDMH	Gas generator	260.66 (SL)	740,400 (SL)				
YF-21C	China	AALPT	Long March 2C, 2D, 3A, 3B, 3C, 4B, 4C	Active	1st	N_{2}O_{4} / UDMH	Gas generator	260.7 (SL)	740,400 (SL)				
YF-22B	China	AALPT	Long March 2E, 2F	Active	2nd	N_{2}O_{4} / UDMH	Gas generator	298.0	738,400				
YF-22C	China	AALPT	Long March 2C, 2D, 4B, 4C	Active	2nd	N_{2}O_{4} / UDMH	Gas generator	298.0	742,040				
YF-22D	China	AALPT	Long March 3	Active	2nd	N_{2}O_{4} / UDMH	Gas generator	298.0	741,400				
YF-22E	China	AALPT	Long March 3A, 3B, 3C	Active	2nd	N_{2}O_{4} / UDMH	Gas generator	298.0	741,400				
YF-25	China	AALPT	Long March 3B, 3C	Active	Booster	N_{2}O_{4} / UDMH	Gas generator	260.66 (SL)	740,400 (SL)				
YF-40	China	AALPT	Long March 4B, 4C	Active	3rd	N_{2}O_{4} / UDMH	Gas generator	303	103,000				
YF-50D	China	AALPT	Long March 3B, 3C, 5, 7	Active	Upper	N_{2}O_{4} / UDMH	Pressure-fed	315.5	6,500				
YF-73	China	AALPT	Long March 3	Active	3rd	LH_{2} / LOX	Gas generator	420.0	44,150				
YF-75	China	AALPT	Long March 3A, 3B, 3C	Active	3rd	LH_{2} / LOX	Gas generator	438.0	78,450				
YF-75D	China	AALPT	Long March 5	Active	2nd	LH_{2} / LOX	Expander, closed	442.6	88,360	41	265	34	6.0
YF-77	China	AALPT	Long March 5	Active	1st	LH_{2} / LOX	Gas generator	428; 316.7 (SL)	700,000; 518,000 (SL)	102	1,054	50	5.5
YF-79	China	AALPT	Long March 9	Development	3rd	LH_{2} / LOX	Expander, closed	455.2	250,000	70			6.0
YF-90	China	AALPT	Long March 9	Development	2nd	LH_{2} / LOX	Staged, fuel-rich	453	2,200,000	183	4,800	46.74	6.0
YF-100	China	AALPT	Long March 7, 5	Active	1st	RP-1 / LOX	Staged, oxidizer-rich	335.1; 300(SL)	1,339,480; 1,199,190 (SL)	180	1,912	64	2.6
YF-115	China	AALPT	Long March 6, 7	Active	2nd	RP-1 / LOX	Staged, oxidizer-rich	341.5	182,400	120			2.5
YF-130	China	AALPT	Long March 9	Development	1st	RP-1 / LOX	Staged, oxidizer-rich	308 (SL)	~5,000,000 (SL)	220	~6,500	78	2.62
Zefiro 9A	Italy	Avio	Vega-C	Active	3rd	HTPB	Solid fuel	295.2	314,000	75	11,400 with fuel		
Zefiro 40	Italy	Avio	Vega-C	Active	3rd	HTPB	Solid fuel	293.5	1,304,000	115	39,206 with fuel		
Zenith	USA	Stoke	Nova	Development	1st	CH_{4} / LOX	Staged, full-flow	~345	>444,822				

== Retired and cancelled rocket engines ==
Engine	Origin	Designer	Vehicle	Status	Use	Propellant	Power cycle	Specific impulse (s)	Thrust (N)	Chamber pressure (bar)	Mass (kg)	Thrust:weight ratio	Oxidizer:fuel ratio
Aeon 1	USA	Relativity Space	Terran 1	Retired	1st	CH_{4} / LOX	Gas generator	310	86,740 (SL)				
Aeon 1 Vacuum	USA	Relativity Space	Terran 1	Retired	2nd	CH_{4} / LOX	Gas generator	360	100,085 (SL)				
Aestus	Germany	Airbus Defence and Space	Ariane 5 G, G+, ES	Retired	Upper	N_{2}O_{4} / MMH	Pressure-fed	324	30,000	11	111	27.6	1.9
Aestus II / RS-72	Germany USA	Airbus Defence and Space, Rocketdyne	Ariane 5	Retired	Upper	N_{2}O_{4} / MMH	Gas generator	340	55,400	60	138	41.0	1.9
Aether	USA	Astra Space	Rocket 3.3	Retired	2nd	RP-1 / LOX	Pressure-fed		3,300				
AJ-60A	USA	Aerojet	Atlas V	Retired	Booster	HTPB	Solid fuel	275	1,270,000				
AJ-260-2	USA	Aerojet	S-I stage replacement (proposed)	Tested, cancelled	1st	PBAN	Solid fuel	263	26,183,755		831,345 with fuel		
AR1	USA	Aerojet Rocketdyne		Cancelled	1st	RP-1 / LOX	Staged, oxidizer-rich		2,200,000 (SL)				2.72
Common Rocket Propulsion Unit	Germany	OTRAG	OTRAG	Tested, cancelled	1st and upper	N_{2}O_{4} / Aerozine 50		297	29,960		150; 1,500 with fuel		
Delphin	USA	Astra Space	Rocket 3.3	Retired	1st	RP-1 / LOX	Electric pump		29,000	31			
F-1 (Note: Most powerful single-chamber liquid-fueled rocket engine ever developed)	USA	Rocketdyne	Saturn V	Retired	1st	RP-1 / LOX	Gas generator	304; 263 (SL)	7,770,000; 6,770,000 (SL)	70	8,391	82.27	2.27
F-1A (Note: Tested but never flown)	USA	Rocketdyne	Saturn MLV	Cancelled	1st	RP-1 / LOX	Gas generator	303; 270 (SL)	8,989,000; 8,007,000 (SL)	80	9,015	90.6	2.27
Gamma 2	United Kingdom	Bristol Siddeley	Black Arrow	Retired	2nd	RP-1 / H_{2}O_{2}	Gas generator	265	68,200		173	40.22	8
Gamma 8	United Kingdom	Bristol Siddeley	Black Arrow	Retired	1st	RP-1 / H_{2}O_{2}	Gas generator	265	234,800	47.40	342	70.01	8
HM7A	France	Snecma	Ariane 1	Retired	3rd	LH_{2} / LOX	Gas generator	443; 308 (SL)	61,700	30	149	42.2	5
HM7B	France	Snecma	Ariane 2, 3, 4, 5 ECA	Retired	Upper	LH_{2} / LOX	Gas generator	446; 310 (SL)	64,800; 43,600 (SL)	37	165	43.25	5
J-2	USA	Rocketdyne	Saturn V, IB	Retired	2nd, 3rd	LH_{2} / LOX	Gas generator	421; 200 (SL)	1,033,100; 486,200 (SL)	52.6	1,438	73.18	5.5
J-2X	USA	Pratt & Whitney Rocketdyne	Ares I, Ares V, SLS (proposed)	Tested, cancelled	Upper	LH_{2} / LOX	Gas generator	448	1,310,000	95	2,470	58.41	5.5–4.5
Kestrel	USA	SpaceX	Falcon 1	Retired	Upper	RP-1 / LOX	Pressure-fed	317	31,000	9.3	52	65	
Kiwi B	USA	LANL		Tested, retired	Upper	Liquid Hydrogen		834	245,000	34			
LE-5	Japan	Mitsubishi, NASDA	H-I	Retired	Upper	LH_{2} / LOX	Gas generator	450	103,000	36.0	245	42.87	5.5
LE-5A	Japan	Mitsubishi, NASDA	H-II	Retired	Upper	LH_{2} / LOX	Expander, open	452	121,500	40.0	242	51.19	5
LE-5B	Japan	Mitsubishi, JAXA	H-IIA, H-IIB	Active	Upper	LH_{2} / LOX	Expander, open	447	137,000	36.0	269	51.93	5
LE-7	Japan	Mitsubishi, NASDA	H-II	Retired	1st	LH_{2} / LOX	Staged, fuel-rich	446	1,078,000; 843,500 (SL)	127	1,714	64.13	5.9
LE-7A	Japan	Mitsubishi, JAXA	H-IIA, H-IIB	Active	1st	LH_{2} / LOX	Staged, fuel-rich	438; 338 (SL)	1,098,000; 870,000 (SL)	120	1,800	65.9	5.9
M-1 (Note: Most powerful Hydrogen-fueled engine ever conceived)	USA	Aerojet		Cancelled	1st, 2nd?	LH_{2} / LOX	Gas generator	428 (SL)	6,670,000		9,068	60	
Merlin 1C	USA	SpaceX	Falcon 9 v1.0	Retired	1st	RP-1 / LOX	Gas generator	311; 282 (SL)	723,000	97	470	158	2.34
Merlin Vacuum 1C	USA	SpaceX	Falcon 9 v1.0	Retired	2nd	RP-1 / LOX	Gas generator	336	413,644			92	
NERVA	USA	LANL		Tested, retired	Upper	Liquid Hydrogen		841; 710 (SL)	246,663		18,144		
NewtonThree	USA	Virgin Orbit	LauncherOne	Retired	Booster	RP-1 / LOX	Gas generator		266,893	70			
NewtonFour	USA	Virgin Orbit	LauncherOne	Retired	2nd	RP-1 / LOX	Gas generator		22,241				
P80	Italy France	Avio	Vega	Retired	1st	HTPB	Solid fuel	280	3,015,000	88	96,000 with fuel		
P230	Europe	Avio	Ariane 5	Retired	Booster	HTPB	Solid fuel	286; 259 (SL)	6,996,000; 5,860,000 (SL)	69	269,000 with fuel		
RD-0120; 11Д122	USSR	KBKhA	Energia	Retired	1st	LH_{2} / LOX	Staged, fuel-rich	455	1,962,000; 1,526,000 (SL)	219	3,450	57.80	
RD-0410; 11Б91	USSR	KBKhA		Cancelled	Upper	Liquid Hydrogen		910	35,200		2,000		
RD-8, 11D513	Soviet Union	Pivdenne/Pivdenmash	Zenit	Retired	2nd vernier	RP-1 / LOX	Staged, oxidizer-rich	342	78,450	77.47	356		2.4
RD-56 (KVD-1); 11Д56У	Russia	KBKhM	GSLV Mk I	Retired	Upper	LH_{2} / LOX	Staged, fuel-rich	462	69,626	55.9	282	25.17	
RD-117; 11Д511	USSR	NPO Energomash	Soyuz-U	Retired	1st	RP-1 / LOX	Gas generator	316; 253 (SL)	978,000; 778,648 (SL)	54.2	1,100	72.18	
RD-118; 11Д512	USSR	NPO Energomash	Soyuz-U	Retired	2nd	RP-1 / LOX	Gas generator	314; 257 (SL)	1,000,278; 818,855 (SL)	59.7	1,100	75.91	
RD-170 (Note: World's most powerful liquid fueled rocket engine)11Д521	USSR	NPO Energomash	Energia	Retired	1st	RP-1 / LOX	Staged, oxidizer-rich	337.2; 309.5 (SL)	7,904,160; 7,256,921 (SL)	250	9,300	79.57	
RD-181	Russia	NPO Energomash	Antares 200	Retired	1st	RP-1 / LOX	Staged, oxidizer-rich	339.2; 311.9 (SL)	2,085,000; 1,922,000 (SL)	262.6	2,200	89	
RD-193	Russia	NPO Energomash	Soyuz-2-1v	Cancelled	1st	RP-1 / LOX	Staged, oxidizer-rich	337.5; 311.2 (SL)	2,084,894; 1,922,103 (SL)		1,900	103.15	
RD-264; 11Д119	USSR	NPO Energomash	Dnepr	Retired	1st	N_{2}O_{4} / UDMH	Staged, oxidizer-rich	318; 293 (SL)	4,521,000	206	3,600	128.15	
RD-270; 8Д420	USSR	NPO Energomash	UR-700 (proposed), UR-900 (proposed)	Tested, cancelled	1st	N_{2}O_{4} / UDMH	Staged, full-flow	322; 301 (SL)	6,710,000; 6,270,000 (SL)	261	3,370	189.91	
RD-275; 14Д14	Russia	NPO Energomash	Proton-M	Retired	1st	N_{2}O_{4} / UDMH	Staged, oxidizer-rich	316; 287 (SL)	1,831,882; 1,671,053 (SL)	160.0	1,070	171.2	
RD-843	Ukraine	Pivdenne/Pivdenmash	Vega	Retired	Upper	N_{2}O_{4} / UDMH	Pressure-fed	315.5	2,452	20.4	15.93		2.0
RD-854; 8D612	Soviet Union	Pivdenne/Pivdenmash	R-36ORB	Retired	3rd	N_{2}O_{4} / UDMH	Gas generator	317	78,710	88.8	123		
RD-855; 8D68M	Soviet Union	Pivdenne/Pivdenmash	Tsyklon-2, -3, R-36	Retired	1st vernier	N_{2}O_{4} / UDMH	Gas generator	292; 254 (SL)	328,000; 285,400 (SL)	65.70	320		1.97
RD-856; 8D69M	Soviet Union	Pivdenne/Pivdenmash	Tsyklon-2, -3 (-4), R-36	Retired	2nd vernier	N_{2}O_{4} / UDMH	Gas generator	280.5	54,230	71.60	112.5		1.98
RD-861; 11D25	Soviet Union	Pivdenne/Pivdenmash	Tsyklon-2, -3	Retired	3rd	N_{2}O_{4} / UDMH	Gas generator	317	78,710	88.8	123		2.1
RD-864; 15D177	Soviet Union	Pivdenne/Pivdenmash	R-36 (missile), Dnipro	Retired	3rd	N_{2}O_{4} / UDMH	Gas generator	298–309	8,450–20,200	17–41	199		1.8
RD-869; 15D300	Soviet Union	Pivdenne/Pivdenmash	R-36M	Retired	3rd	N_{2}O_{4} / UDMH	Gas generator	302.3–313	8,580–20,470	17–41	196		1.8
RS-2200	USA	Rocketdyne	VentureStar	Tested, cancelled	1st	LH_{2} / LOX	Gas generator	455; 347 (SL)	2,201,000; 1,917,000 (SL)	155		83	
RS-27A	USA	Rocketdyne	Delta	Retired	1st	RP-1 / LOX	Gas generator	302; 255 (SL)	1,054,200	49	1,091	102.5	2.245
RS-68A (Note: Most powerful hydrogen-fueled engine ever flown)	USA	Rocketdyne	Delta IV, IV Heavy	Retired	1st	LH_{2} / LOX	Gas generator	411; 362 (SL)	3,558,577; 3,135,996 (SL)	109	6,686	54.31	5.97
RS-83	USA	Rocketdyne		Cancelled	1st	LH_{2} / LOX	Gas generator	446	3,300,000		6,686		
RS-84	USA	Rocketdyne		Cancelled	1st	RP-1 / LOX	Staged, oxidizer rich	324; 305 (SL)	5,036,000; 4,732,000 (SL)	177	6,783		
Space Shuttle Solid Rocket Booster (Note: Largest solid-fuel rocket motor ever flown, and the first to be used for primary propulsion on human spaceflight missions)	USA	Thiokol	Space Shuttle, Ares I	Retired	Booster	PBAN / APCP	Solid fuel	268	14,000,000; 12,500,000 (SL)		590,000 with fuel		
Sea Dragon first stage engine	USA	Aerojet	Sea Dragon	Cancelled	1st	RP-1 / LOX		242	355,800,000				
Sea Dragon second stage engine	USA	Aerojet	Sea Dragon	Cancelled	2nd	LH_{2} / LOX		409	62,800,000				
Sea Dragon vernier engine	USA	Aerojet	Sea Dragon	Cancelled	2nd vernier	LH_{2} / LOX			236,600				
SRB-A	Japan	IHI Aerospace, JAXA	H-IIA	Retired	Booster	HTPB	Solid fuel	280	2,250,000		76,400 with fuel		
TR-106	USA	TRW		Tested, cancelled	1st	LH_{2} / LOX			2,892,000 (SL)				
TR-107	USA	Northrop Grumman		Cancelled	1st	RP-1 / LOX			4,900,000 (SL)	177			
TR-201	USA	TRW	Delta-P	Retired	2nd	N_{2}O_{4} / Aerozine 50	Presssure-fed	301	41,900	6.9	113	31.4	
UA1207	USA	United Technologies	Titan IV	Retired	Booster	PBAN	Solid fuel	272; 245 (SL)	7,116,000; 6,410,400 (SL)		319,330 with fuel		
Viking 2	France	Snecma	Ariane 1	Retired	1st	N_{2}O_{4} / UDMH	Gas generator		690,000; 611,200 (SL)		776	90.67	
Viking 2B	France	Snecma	Ariane 2, 3	Retired	1st	N_{2}O_{4} / UH 25	Gas generator		643,000 (SL)		776	84.5	
Viking 4	France	Snecma	Ariane 1	Retired	2nd	N_{2}O_{4} / UDMH	Gas generator		713,000		826	88	
Viking 4B	France	Snecma	Ariane 2, 3, 4	Retired	2nd	N_{2}O_{4} / UH 25	Gas generator		800,000		826	98.76	
Viking 5C	France	Snecma	Ariane 4	Retired	1st	N_{2}O_{4} / UH 25	Gas generator		758,000; 678,000 (SL)		826	93.57	
Viking 6	France	Snecma	Ariane 4	Retired	Booster	N_{2}O_{4} / UH 25	Gas generator		750,000		826	92.59	
Vulcain; HM-60	Europe	Snecma	Ariane 5	Retired	1st	LH_{2} / LOX	Gas generator	439; 326 (SL)	1,113,000; 773,200 (SL)	109	1,300	84.38	
Vulcain 2	Europe	Snecma	Ariane 5	Retired	1st	LH_{2} / LOX	Gas generator	429; 318 (SL)	1,359,000; 939,500 (SL)	117.3	1,800	77.04	
VTR-10	USA	TRW	Apollo LM	Retired	Upper	N_{2}O_{4} / Aerozine 50	Presssure-fed	311	47,000	7.68	179		
Waxwing	United Kingdom	Bristol Aerojet	Black Arrow	Retired	Upper		Solid fuel	278; 245 (SL)	29,400; 25,900 (SL)		87	34.48	
XRS-2200	USA	Rocketdyne	X-33	Tested, cancelled	1st	LH_{2} / LOX	Gas generator	439; 339 (SL)	1,184,000; 909,000 (SL)	58			
Zefiro 23	Italy	Avio	Vega	Retired	2nd	HTPB	Solid fuel	287.5	1,122,000	94	25,935 with fuel		

== See also ==
- Comparison of orbital launch systems
- Comparison of orbital launchers families
- Comparison of crewed space vehicles
- Comparison of space station cargo vehicles
- Comparison of solid-fuelled orbital launch systems
- List of space launch system designs
- List of orbital launch systems
