= Anatoly Agarkov =

Soviet and Ukrainian scientist and spacecraft engineer

- Born: Anatoly Vasilievich Agarkov; 21 September 1949 (age 76); Dnipropetrovsk, Ukrainian SSR, Soviet Union
- Citizenship: Soviet Union; Ukraine
- Education: Oles Honchar Dnipro National University
- Occupations: Aerospace engineer; rocket engineer
- Employer: KB Pivdenne
- Awards: Lenin Komsomol Prize; Order of Friendship; State Prize of Ukraine in Science and Technology; Order of Merit (Ukraine); Honorary Professional Order

Anatoly Vasilievich Agarkov (Russian: Анатолий Васильевич Агарков, IPA: [ɐnɐˈtolʲɪj vɐˈsʲilʲjɪvʲɪtɕ ɐˈɡarkəf]; born 21 September 1949) is a Soviet and Ukrainian scientist and spacecraft engineer, one of the key figures in Sea Launch, Antares, and Zenit projects.

== Life and career ==
In 1976, Anatoly Agarkov graduated from Dnipropetrovsk State University (now the Oles Honchar Dnipro National University) with a degree in Electromechanics and proceeded to join the Yangel Yuzhnoe design office, a structure known today as KB Pivdenne. There, he got the benefit of learning from top Soviet and Ukrainian scientists and aerospace engineers of the time — Mikhail Galas, Victor Grachev, Vladimir Komanov, and Stanislav Konyukhov — while working his way up from a regular engineer to design lead supervising the Zenit launch vehicles programme (1976–1992), deputy CEO (1993–1996), chief spacecraft designer (1996–2001), deputy chief designer for testing operations (2005–2013), and deputy chief designer for testing and flight operations (2013–2021).

In the two latter capacities, he oversaw the strategic development and implementation of Sea Launch and Land Launch programmes as well as the design and testing of Tsyklon-2, Tsyklon-3, Tsyklon-4, and Dnepr space vehicle systems. In addition, he was in charge of the adaptation of Zenit rockets for the Odyssey ocean-based launch platform. Agarkov also kick-started the Zenit2-3SL launches which were commemorated in Ukraine by a special 5 Hryven coin, and introduced the DemoSat payload for the first Boeing Sea Launch mission. He proceeded to apply the Zenit vehicles for international satellite launches such as the Globalstar series.

His contribution to the design and operation of the Zenit programme and the joint Ukrainian-American Antares launch system earned him the State Prize of Ukraine in Science and Technology (2002). His other areas of responsibility included the flight test programmes of Tselina-2, Orlets-2, Resurs-01, and Okean satellites.

Since 2021, Anatoly Agarkov has been an advisor to the CEO of Pivdenne design office.

He is the holder of several patents, notably for a land-based factory testing system and for preparation and launch of a rocket from a sea-based launch site (jointly with Stanislav Konyukhov).

== Awards ==
- Lenin Komsomol Prize
- Order of Friendship
- Medal of the Order of Services to the Fatherland
- Russian Government Award for Science and Technology
- Russian Government Yuri Gagarin Award for Achievements in Space

== Bibliography ==
- A.V. Agarkov, V.A. Pyrig. Loading of Launch Vehicle when Launching from Floating Launch Platform // IAF Abstracts, 34th COSPAR Scientific Assembly, Houston, USA, 2002
- A.V. Agarkov et al. The Use of High Alloyed Silicon Semi-Conductors to Ensure Highly-Accurate Temperature Measurements during Launch Vehicles Filling with Propellants // Aerospace Research Center, November 2012
- A.V. Agarkov, ed. My uchim rakety letat′. K 50-letiiu podrazdeleniia ispytaniĭ i ėkspluatatsii KB “Iuzhnoe” [We Teach Rockets to Fly: a 50th anniversary almanach of Pivdenne design office ], Dnipropetrovsk: Art-Press, 2012
- A.V. Agarkov, ed. Victor Grachev — glavny ispytatel KB “Iuzhnoe” [Victor Grachev — Chief Test Officer of Pivdenne] (Dnipro: Pivdenne, 2013)
- A.V. Agarkov, ed. Analiz avarii i neispravnostei v raketno-kosmicheskoi tekhnike [A Study of Breakdowns and Malfunctions in Spacecraft] (Dnipro, 2019)
