= RD-856 =

RD-856 (РД-856)
- Country of origin: Soviet Union
- First flight: December 16, 1965
- Last flight: January 30, 2009
- Designer: Yuzhnoye Design Bureau
- Manufacturer: Yuzhmash
- Application: Vernier
- Associated LV: R-36, Tsyklon-2 and Tsyklon-3
- Status: Out of production

Liquid-fuel engine
- Propellant: N_{2}O_{4} / UDMH
- Mixture ratio: 1.98
- Cycle: Gas generator

Configuration
- Chamber: 4

Performance
- Thrust, vacuum: 54.23 kN (12,190 lbf)
- Chamber pressure: 7.160 MPa (1,038.5 psi)
- Specific impulse, vacuum: 280.5 s (2.751 km/s)
- Burn time: Up to 163 s
- Restarts: 1
- Gimbal range: ±30°

Dimensions
- Length: 0.9 m (2 ft 11 in)
- Diameter: 3.35 m (11.0 ft)
- Dry mass: 112.5 kg (248 lb)

Used in
- R-36, Tsyklon-2 and Tsyklon-3 second stage vernier

The RD-856 (Russian: Ракетный Двигатель-856, romanized: Raketnyy Dvigatel-856, lit. 'Rocket Engine 856', GRAU index: 8D69M), also known as the RD-69M, is a four-nozzle liquid-fuel rocket vernier engine, burning a hypergolic mixture of unsymmetrical dimethylhydrazine (UDMH) fuel with dinitrogen tetroxide (N_{2}O_{4}) oxidizer in a gas generator cycle. It was used on the R-36, Tsyklon-2 and Tsyklon-3 second stage as thrust vector control by gimbaling of its nozzle. The engine is distributed through a cylindrical structure that is integrated around the main engine RD-252 module. The structure includes aerodynamic protection for the nozzles. The engine was started by a pyrotechnic ignitor.

The engine was serially produced between 1965 and 1992. It was first launched on December 16, 1965 on an R-36 and its last launch was on January 30, 2009 with the last launch of the Tsyklon-3. The production capability was restarted for the Tsyklon-4 but with the apparent cancellation of the program the engine would still be out of production.

== See also ==
- R-36 - The Soviet ICBM for which the RD-856 was created.
- Tsyklon-2 - A Soviet small rocket that uses the RD-856.
- Tsyklon-3 - A Soviet small rocket that uses the RD-856.
- Tsyklon-4 - A Ukrainian small rocket project that would have used the RD-856.
- Yuzhnoe Design Bureau - The RD-856 designer bureau.
