= RD-855 =

Liquid rocket engine

RD-855 (РД-855)
- Country of origin: Soviet Union
- First flight: December 16, 1965
- Last flight: January 30, 2009
- Designer: Yuzhnoye Design Bureau
- Manufacturer: Yuzhmash
- Application: Vernier
- Associated LV: R-36, Tsyklon-2 and Tsyklon-3
- Status: Out of production

Liquid-fuel engine
- Propellant: N_{2}O_{4} / UDMH
- Mixture ratio: 1.97
- Cycle: Gas generator

Configuration
- Chamber: 4

Performance
- Thrust, vacuum: 328 kN (74,000 lbf)
- Thrust, sea-level: 285.4 kN (64,200 lbf)
- Chamber pressure: 6.570 MPa (952.9 psi)
- Specific impulse, vacuum: 292 s (2.86 km/s)
- Specific impulse, sea-level: 254 s (2.49 km/s)
- Burn time: Up to 127 s
- Restarts: 1
- Gimbal range: ±41°

Dimensions
- Length: 1.74 m (5 ft 9 in)
- Diameter: 3.81 m (12.5 ft)
- Dry mass: 320 kg (710 lb)

Used in
- R-36, Tsyklon-2 and Tsyklon-3 first stage vernier

The RD-855 (Russian: Ракетный Двигатель-855, romanized: Raketnyy Dvigatel-855, lit. 'Rocket Engine 855', GRAU index: 8D68M), also known as the RD-68M, is a liquid-fueled rocket engine with four nozzles. As a vernier engine, it provides fine steering adjustments for rockets. It is powered by a hypergolic mixture of unsymmetrical dimethylhydrazine (UDMH) fuel with dinitrogen tetroxide (N_{2}O_{4}) oxidizer. This combination is hypergolic, meaning the two substances ignite on contact, eliminating the need for an external ignition source.

The RD-855 can orient its chambers within a range of ±42° using hydraulic cylinders. Each chamber on the Tsyklon rockets is protected by an aerodynamic cover, and these covers are equipped with small retro-rockets allowing for separation from the second stage.

The RD-855 utilizes the gas generator cycle, in which a portion of the propellant is burned in a pre-burner to produce hot gases that drive the engine's turbopumps, and then the gases are discarded without passing through the main combustion chamber.

It played a key role in rockets such as the R-36, Tsyklon-2, and Tsyklon-3, steering these rockets by adjusting its nozzles. The engine is housed in a cylindrical structure that surrounds the primary RD-251 engine. This arrangement provides protection for the nozzles and ensures the successful detachment of the rocket's first stage. The RD-855 is activated two seconds before the main RD-251 engine.

Manufactured from 1965 to 1992, the RD-855's inaugural flight was on December 16, 1965, aboard the R-36 missile. Its most recent known flight was on January 30, 2009, with the Tsyklon-3. Although there were plans to restart its production for the Tsyklon-4, the engine remains out of production following the potential discontinuation of the program.

== See also ==
- R-36 – The Soviet ICBM for which the RD-855 was created.
- Tsyklon-2 – A Soviet small rocket that uses the RD-855.
- Tsyklon-3 – A Soviet small rocket that uses the RD-855.
- Tsyklon-4 – A Ukrainian small rocket project that would have used the RD-855.
- Yuzhnoe Design Bureau – The RD-855 designer bureau.
