= RD-861 =

Soviet rocket engine

RD-861 (РД-861)
- Country of origin: Soviet Union
- First flight: October 27, 1967
- Designer: Yuzhnoye Design Bureau
- Manufacturer: Yuzhmash
- Application: Upper stage
- Associated LV: Tsyklon-3
- Predecessor: RD-854
- Successor: RD-861K
- Status: Out of production

Liquid-fuel engine
- Propellant: N_{2}O_{4} / UDMH
- Mixture ratio: 2.1
- Cycle: Gas generator

Configuration
- Chamber: 1 + 4
- Nozzle ratio: 112.4 (main)

Performance
- Thrust, vacuum: 78.71 kN (17,690 lbf)
- Chamber pressure: 8.88 MPa (1,288 psi)
- Specific impulse, vacuum: 317 seconds
- Burn time: Up to 130s
- Restarts: 1

Dimensions
- Length: 1.56 m (5 ft 1 in)
- Diameter: 1.53 m (5 ft 0 in)
- Dry mass: 123 kg (271 lb)

Used in
- Tsyklon-2 and Tsyklon-3 third stage

The RD-861 (Russian: Ракетный Двигатель-861, romanized: Raketnyy Dvigatel-861, lit. 'Rocket Engine 861') is a Soviet liquid propellant rocket engine burning a hypergolic mixture of unsymmetrical dimethylhydrazine (UDMH) fuel with dinitrogen tetroxide (N_{2}O_{4}) oxidizer in a gas generator combustion cycle. It has a main combustion chamber, with four vernier nozzles fed by the gas generator output. It can be reignited a single time.

== History ==
When the Soviet military developed the Fractional Orbital Bombardment System, Yangel's OKB-586 proposed a new version of their R-36 ICBM, called the R-36-ORB (GRAU Index: 8K69). It incorporated an orbital warhead called OGCh (GRAU Index: 8F021), for which the RD-854 engine was developed in-house. Since the Outer Space Treaty of 1967 banned nuclear weapons in Earth orbit, but did not ban the launch systems, the Soviet Union proceeded to test their FOBS albeit without placing nuclear warheads in orbit.

== Versions ==
There are three versions of this engine:

- RD-854 (GRAU Index: 8D612): First developed as the third stage engine for the R-36ORB FOBS.
- RD-861 (GRAU Index: 11D25): Also known as the D-25. It was the engine of the Tsyklon-3 third stage.
- RD-861K : An improved RD-861, developed for the third stage of the Tsyklon-4. The vernier nozzles were replaced with a hydraulic actuated gimbal for the whole engine. The isp was increased, the burn time tripled and the reignitions increased to three.

== See also ==
- R-36ORB - The Soviet ICBM that was part of the Fractional Orbital Bombardment System and for which the RD-854 was created.
- Tsyklon-3 - A Soviet small rocket that uses the RD-861.
- Tsyklon-4 - A Ukrainian small rocket project that would have used the RD-861K.
- Yuzhnoe Design Bureau - The RD-854/861 designer bureau.
- Yuzhmash - A multi-product machine-building company that's closely related to Yuzhnoe and manufactures the RD-854/861.
