= Tsyklon =

Soviet rocket

- Function: Medium-lift launch vehicle
- Manufacturer: Yuzhmash
- Country of origin: Soviet Union

Size
- Height: 39.7 m (130 ft)
- Diameter: 3 m (9.8 ft)
- Mass: 182 t (401,000 lb)
- Stages: 2

Capacity

Payload to low Earth orbit
- Mass: 3,000 kg (6,600 lb)

Launch history
- Status: Retired
- Launch sites: Baikonur Cosmodrome, LC-90
- Total launches: 8
- Success(es): 7
- Failure: 1
- First flight: 27 October 1967
- Last flight: 25 January 1969
- Carries passengers or cargo: IS-A/IS-P; RORSAT

First stage – 8S671
- Powered by: 1 RD-251
- Maximum thrust: 2,640 kN (590,000 lb_{f})
- Specific impulse: 301 s (2.95 km/s)
- Burn time: 120 seconds
- Propellant: N_{2}O_{4} / UDMH

Second stage – 8S672
- Powered by: 1 RD-252
- Maximum thrust: 940 kN (210,000 lb_{f}) (211,410 lb_{f})
- Specific impulse: 317 s (3.11 km/s)
- Burn time: 160 seconds
- Propellant: N_{2}O_{4} / UDMH

The Tsyklon (Ukrainian: Циклон, lit. 'Cyclone', also known as Tsiklon), GRAU index 11K67, was a Soviet-designed expendable launch system, primarily used to put Kosmos satellites into low Earth orbit in the late-1960s. It is based on the R-36 intercontinental ballistic missile designed by Mikhail Yangel and made eight launches, with seven successes and one failure. All of its launches were conducted from LC-90 at the Baikonur Cosmodrome. It is sometimes designated Tsyklon-2A, not to be confused with the later Tsyklon-2 rocket. It was introduced in 1967 and was derived from the R-36 ICBM. It was retired in 1969.

It made its maiden flight on 27 October 1967. The booster's design was kept secret and no images or film clips of the complete vehicle were released to the public until after the collapse of the Soviet Union, in part because of being used exclusively for military payloads and also because it was derived from an actively serving missile system. After 1991, the plant where the R-36/Tsyklon were manufactured ended up in newly independent Ukraine.

Tsyklon was designed by the Yuzhnoye Design Bureau and manufactured by Yuzhmash (both in Dnipropetrovsk, Ukraine). Control system was designed at NPO "Electropribor" (Kharkiv, Ukraine). The last flown derivative, the Tsyklon-3 was retired in January 2009. Another derivative, the Tsyklon-4, continued to be developed after the retirement of Tsyklon-3, but the Tsyklon-4 project was cancelled in 2015 due to financial concerns. Tsyklon-4 never reached launch pad. However, yet another derivative, the Cyclone-4M, a development of Tsyklon-4, continued to be developed and is still currently (2021) under development.

== Derivatives ==
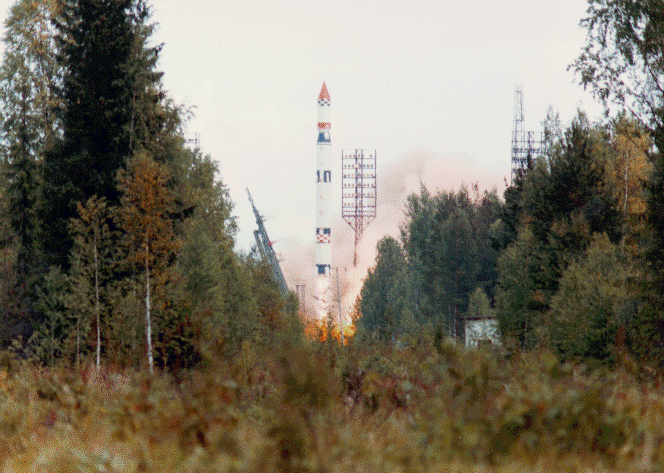
Tsyklon-3 rocket launching a Meteor-3 weather observation satellite (Plesetsk, Aug. 15, 1991)

Two rockets were derived from the Tsyklon: the Tsyklon-2 and Tsyklon-3, known respectively as the SL-11 and SL-14 by the United States DoD.

=== Tsyklon-2 ===
The two stage Tsyklon-2 was first launched 6 August 1977 from the Baikonur Cosmodrome in Kazakhstan. The Tsyklon-2 was 39.7 metres (130 ft) long with a fueled mass of 182 tonnes. The Tsyklon-2 made its final flight in 2006.

=== Tsyklon-3 ===
The Tsyklon-3, which featured a restartable third stage, first launched on 24 June 1977 from the Plesetsk Cosmodrome. The Tsyklon-3 is 39.27 metres (128.8 ft) long with a fueled mass of 186 to 190 tonnes. It was partially the result of an effort to reduce the number of Soviet launch vehicles in use, replacing the small R-12 derived Kosmos booster and some R-7 variants.

On 27 December 2000, a Tsyklon-3 failed in its attempt to carry six Russian satellites into orbit, plummeting to the earth. An electrical failure in the rocket's third stage was the suspected cause.

The Tsyklon-3 was retired after launching the Koronas-Foton satellite on 30 January 2009.

=== Tsyklon-4 ===
The Tsyklon-4 was under development as an evolution of the Tsyklon-3, but was eventually abandoned due to economic and market concerns. A derivative, the Cyclone-4M, is under development as of 2019 for Canadian service provider Maritime Launch Services; however the Cyclone-4M does not share any booster stage derived from the original Tsyklon series.

== See also ==
- Comparison of orbital launchers families
- R-36 (missile)
- Dnepr (rocket)
