= Oleksandr Makarov =

Soviet engineer (1906–1999)

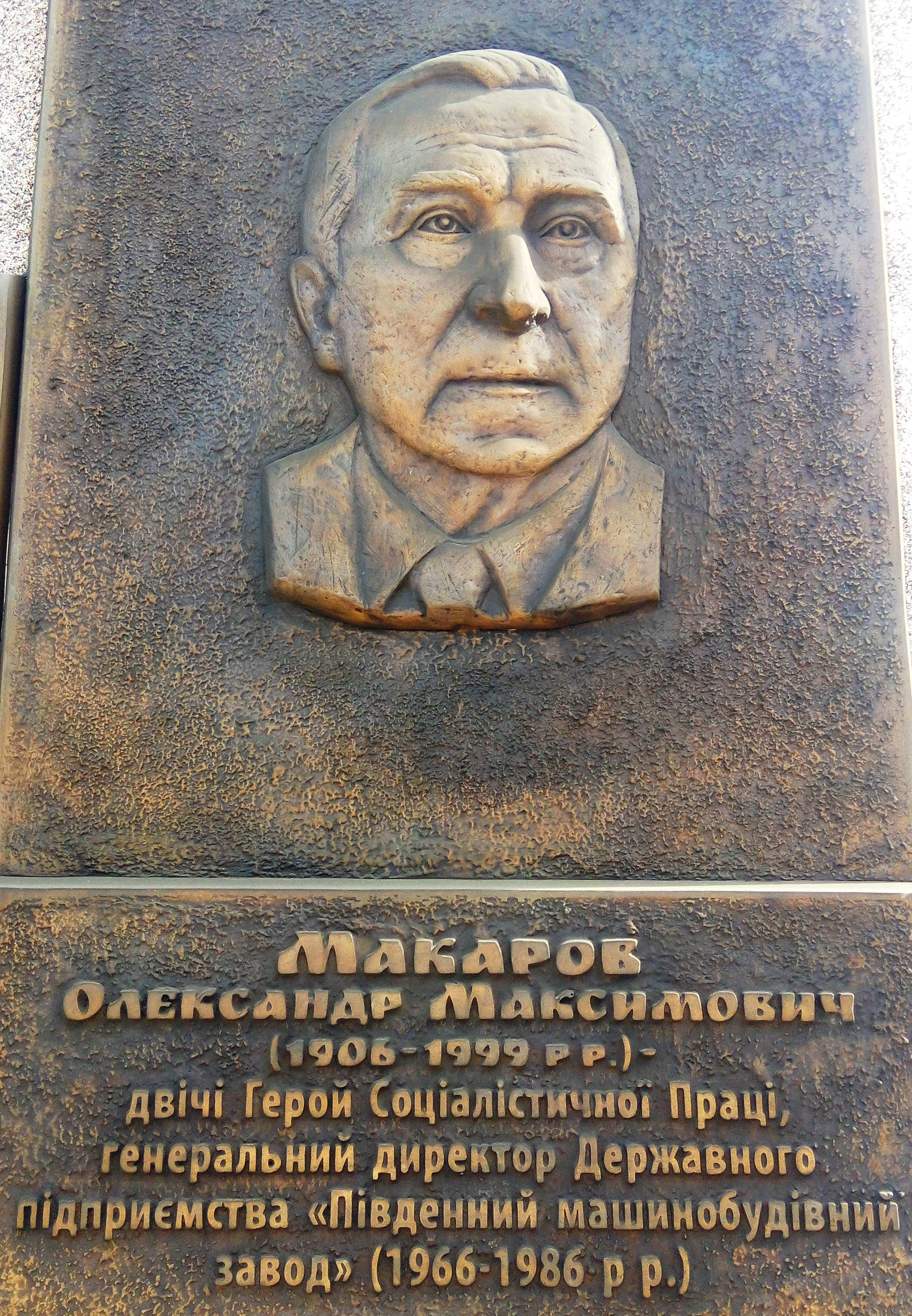
- Born: Oleksandr Maksymovych Makarov; September 12, 1906; Tsimlyansk, Don Host Oblast, Russian Empire
- Died: October 9, 1999 (aged 93); Dnipropetrovsk, Ukraine
- Occupation: Rocket engineer

Oleksandr Maksymovych Makarov (Ukrainian: Олександр Максимович Макаров; September 12, 1906 – October 9, 1999) was a Soviet and Ukrainian rocket engineer and General Director of PA Pivdenmash from 1961 to 1986, Laureate of Lenin and State Awards, twice Hero of Socialist Labour, Honored Mechanical Engineer of the Ukrainian SSR, holder of the Order of Prince Yaroslav the Wise, and Honorary Citizen of Dnepropetrovsk.

His memorial bust is located in a public town square in Dnipro.
