= YF-90 =

Chinese liquid-fuel rocket engine

- Country of origin: China
- Associated LV: Long March 9
- Predecessor: YF-77
- Status: In development

Liquid-fuel engine
- Propellant: Liquid oxygen / Liquid hydrogen
- Mixture ratio: 6.0 (±5%) Variable
- Cycle: Staged combustion cycle
- Pumps: 2

Configuration
- Nozzle ratio: 100

Performance
- Thrust, vacuum: 2,200 kilonewtons (490,000 lb_{f})
- Thrust-to-weight ratio: 46.7
- Specific impulse, vacuum: 453 seconds (4.44 km/s)

Dimensions
- Length: 6.1 metres (20 ft) (With Engine Mount)
- Diameter: 2.87 metres (9 ft 5 in)
- Dry mass: 4,800 kilograms (10,600 lb)

The YF-90 is a liquid cryogenic rocket engine burning liquid hydrogen and liquid oxygen in a staged combustion cycle. It is China's first hydrogen-oxygen engine to use the staged combustion cycle and is expected to be used for the second stage of the Long March 9, which is a three-stage rocket with boosters. The engine has features such as variable thrust, multiple ignitions, and automatic fault diagnosis.

== History ==
On July 28, 2021, the engine's manufacturer, China Aerospace Science and Technology Corporation (CASC) completed the first YF-90 engineering prototype.

On September 23, 2021, the engine successfully underwent its first semi-system test. The YF -90 engine is one of the key technologies for China's deep space exploration ambitions.

In 2023, CASC plans to conduct more tests on the YF-90 engine, as well as on its first-stage counterpart, the YF-130 engine. The YF-130 is a liquid kerosene-oxygen rocket engine with a thrust of 500 tonnes. Both engines are expected to be ready for flight by 2025.

On December 17, 2024, the engine successfully underwent its first full system test.
