= Cyclone-4M =

Ukrainian small-lift rocket

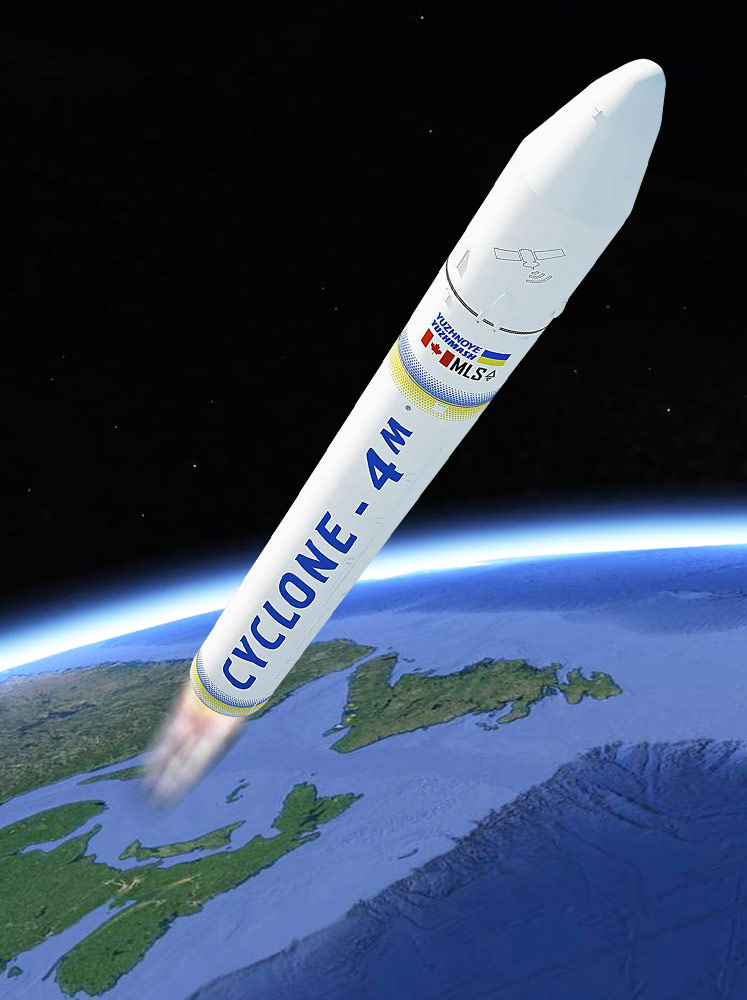
- Function: Carrier rocket
- Manufacturer: Pivdenne (design); Pivdenmash (manufacturing); Khartron (control system)
- Country of origin: Ukraine
- Project cost: $304M (projection, $148M spaceport included)
- Cost per launch: $45M-$60M (projections)

Size
- Height: 38.7 m (127.0 ft)
- Diameter: 4.0 m (13 ft)
- Stages: 2

Capacity

Payload to 200 km LEO (45.3°)
- Mass: 5,000 kg (11,000 lb)

Payload to 500 km LEO
- Mass: 4,600 kg (10,100 lb)

Payload to 1200 km LEO
- Mass: 3,900 kg (8,600 lb)

Payload to 500 km polar LEO
- Mass: 3,600 kg (7,900 lb)

Payload to 1200 km polar LEO
- Mass: 3,000 kg (6,600 lb)

Payload to 500 km SSO
- Mass: 3,450 kg (7,610 lb)

Payload to 1000 km SSO
- Mass: 3,000 kg (6,600 lb)

Payload to 180×35,768 km) GTO (45.2°)
- Mass: 910 kg (2,010 lb)

Associated rockets
- Family: Zenit / Tsyklon
- Comparable: Tsyklon-2, -3, -4, Dnepr, Soyuz-2, PSLV, Long March 4B/C

Launch history
- Status: In development
- Launch sites: Canso, Nova Scotia, Canada
- Total launches: 0
- First flight: 2025 (planned)

First stage
- Diameter: 3.9 m (13 ft)
- Gross mass: 260,700 kg (575,000 lb)
- Propellant mass: 224,800 kg (496,000 lb)
- Powered by: 4 × RD-870 engines
- Maximum thrust: Sea level: 3,130 kN (319 tf); Vacuum: 3,498 kN (356.7 tf)
- Specific impulse: Sea level: 298 s (2.92 km/s); Vacuum: 332 s (3.26 km/s)
- Burn time: 200 seconds
- Propellant: LOX / RP-1

Second stage
- Diameter: 3.98 m (13.1 ft)
- Gross mass: 14,000 kg (31,000 lb)
- Propellant mass: 10,700 kg (24,000 lb)
- Powered by: 1 × RD-861K
- Maximum thrust: 77.63 kN (7.916 tf)
- Specific impulse: 325 s (3.19 km/s)
- Burn time: 450 seconds
- Propellant: N_{2}O_{4} / UDMH

The Cyclone-4M is a Ukrainian carrier rocket which is being developed for commercial satellite launches.

== History ==
The Cyclone-4M is derived from the Tsyklon-4, which started its life as an all-hypergolic three-stage-to-orbit expendable launch vehicle planned for launch from a proposed site at the Alcântara Launch Center in Brazil. However, Brazil backed out of the partnership with Ukraine in 2015, citing concerns over the project budget, the ongoing financial situation in both countries, and the future of the commercial launch market. In March 2017, Canadian company Maritime Launch Services announced plans to begin launching a modified version, the Cyclone-4M, which features a Zenit-derived LOX / RP-1 first stage in place of the originally planned R-36 ICBM-based first- and second-stage.

In November 2021, Maritime Launch Services CEO Stephen Matier stated that Nanoracks was to be the first client to fly a payload on the Cyclone-4M.

== Design ==
This new first-stage design would use four kerolox engines derived from the RD-120 used on the second stage of the Zenit. The standard RD-120, however, while manufactured in Ukraine, uses a number of Russian-made components which would have to be replaced with Ukrainian-made equivalents. It is also planned to fit each of these engines with a gimballing mechanism for steering (in the Zenit second stage the RD-120 is fixed to the frame while an RD-8 four-nozzle vernier engine takes care of the steering). The second stage completed qualification tests in October 2019.

== Spaceport Nova Scotia ==
Cyclone-4M was planned to launch from a site in Canso, Nova Scotia. Construction was originally scheduled to begin in 2018. However, repeated delays pushed the start of construction to September 2022 for the access road, and March 2023 for work to start on the first launch pad. MLS completed construction on the first launch pad in 2024. However, because of the 2022 Russian invasion of Ukraine, and the uncertainty it caused, MLS terminated the agreement to launch Cyclone from Spaceport Nova Scotia by third quarter 2024.
