= KB Pivdenne =

Ukrainian rocket and satellite designer

Coordinates: 48°26′14″N 34°57′01″E

Pivdenne Design Office
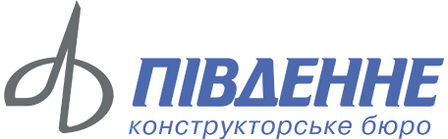
- Type: State owned
- Industry: Aerospace, defense
- Predecessors: OKB-586, SDO Yuzhnoye
- Founded: 1951; 75 years ago
- Founder: Mikhail Yangel
- Headquarters: Dnipro, Ukraine
- Area served: Worldwide
- Number of employees: 5,500 (2017)
- Website: yuzhnoye.com

The Pivdenne Design Office (Ukrainian: Державне конструкторське бюро «Південне» ім. М. К. Янгеля, abbr. Державне КБП, romanized: Derzhavne konstruktorske biuro "Pivdenne" im. M. K. Yanhelia, abbr. Derzhavne KB Pivdenne, lit. 'State design bureau "Southern", named after M. K. Yangel'), located in Dnipro, Ukraine, is a designer of satellites and rockets, and formerly of Soviet intercontinental ballistic missiles (ICBMs), established by Mikhail Yangel. During the Soviet era, the bureau's OKB designation was OKB-586.

The company is in close co-operation with the PA Pivdenmash multi-product machine-building company, also situated in Dnipro. Pivdenmash is the main manufacturer of the models developed by Pivdenne Design Office.

== Directors ==
- 1954–1971 Mikhail Yangel
- 1971–1991 Vladimir Utkin
- 1991–2010 Stanislav Konyukhov
- 2010–2020 Oleksandr Dehtiariov

== Products ==
=== Current ===
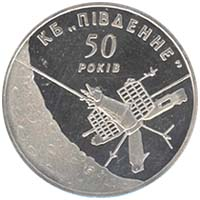
Jubilee Coin "50 Years of the State Design Office "Pivdenne"

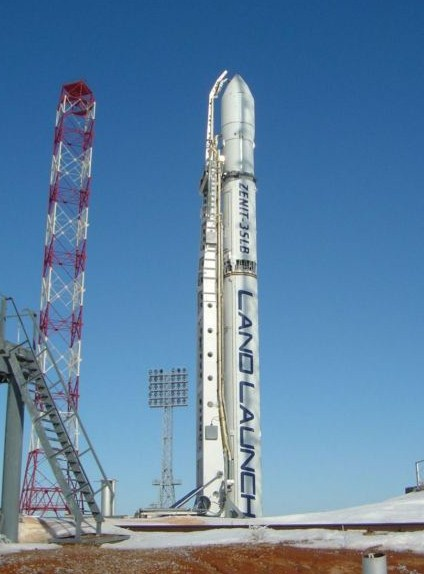
Zenit-3SLБ

==== Ballistic missiles ====
- Hrim-2

==== Orbital launch vehicles ====
- Zenit rocket family
  - Zenit-2
  - Zenit-2M
  - Zenit-3F
  - Zenit-3SL
  - Zenit-3SLB
- Antares first stage core, in cooperation with Orbital Sciences Corporation
- Dnepr, converted R-36 ICBM
- R-36 ICBM, NATO reporting name SS-18 'Satan'

==== Rocket engines ====
- Main engines
  - RD-843
  - RD-853
  - RD-859
  - RD-860
  - RD-861K
  - RD-866
  - RD-868
- Steering engines
  - RD-8
  - RD-855
  - RD-856
- Thrusters
  - Tsyklon-3 thruster (30 N (6.7 lb_{f}))
  - Tsyklon-3 thruster (100 N (22 lb_{f}))
  - Okean-O thruster (30 N (6.7 lb_{f}))
  - Tsyklon-4 thruster (30 N (6.7 lb_{f}))

=== Planned ===
==== Orbital launch vehicles ====
- Tsyklon rocket family
  - Cyclone-4M – first launch planned for 2023
- Mayak rocket family

==== Rocket engines ====
- Main engines
  - RD-801
  - RD-809
  - RD-809K
  - RD-810
  - DU-802

==== Satellites ====
- Sich-2-1
- Sich-2-M
- Sich-3-O
- Sich-3-P
- YuzhSat
- YuzhSat-1
- Mikrosat
- Ionosat

=== Retired ===
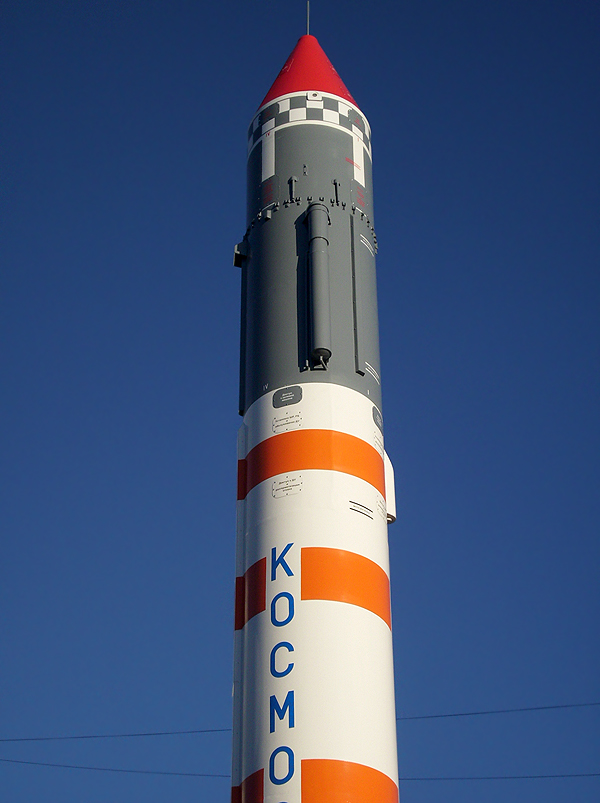
Kosmos

- Tsyklon rocket family
  - Tsyklon 2
  - Tsyklon-3
- Kosmos-2I
- Kosmos-3M
- R-12 Dvina TBM, NATO reporting name SS-4 'Sandal'
- R-14 Chusovaya ICBM, NATO reporting name SS-5 'Skean'
- R-16 ICBM, NATO reporting name SS-7 'Saddler' (see also Nedelin catastrophe)
- R-26 ICBM, NATO reporting name SS-8 'Sasin'
- R-36 ICBM, NATO reporting name SS-9 'Scarp'
- RT-20 ICBM, NATO reporting name SS-15 'Scrooge' (planned but never deployed)
- MR-UR-100 Sotka ICBM, NATO reporting name SS-17 'Spanker'
- RT-23 Molodets ICBM, NATO reporting name SS-24 'Scalpel'

== See also ==
- List of design bureaus in Ukraine
