= Tsyklon-4 =

Cancelled Ukrainian carrier rocket

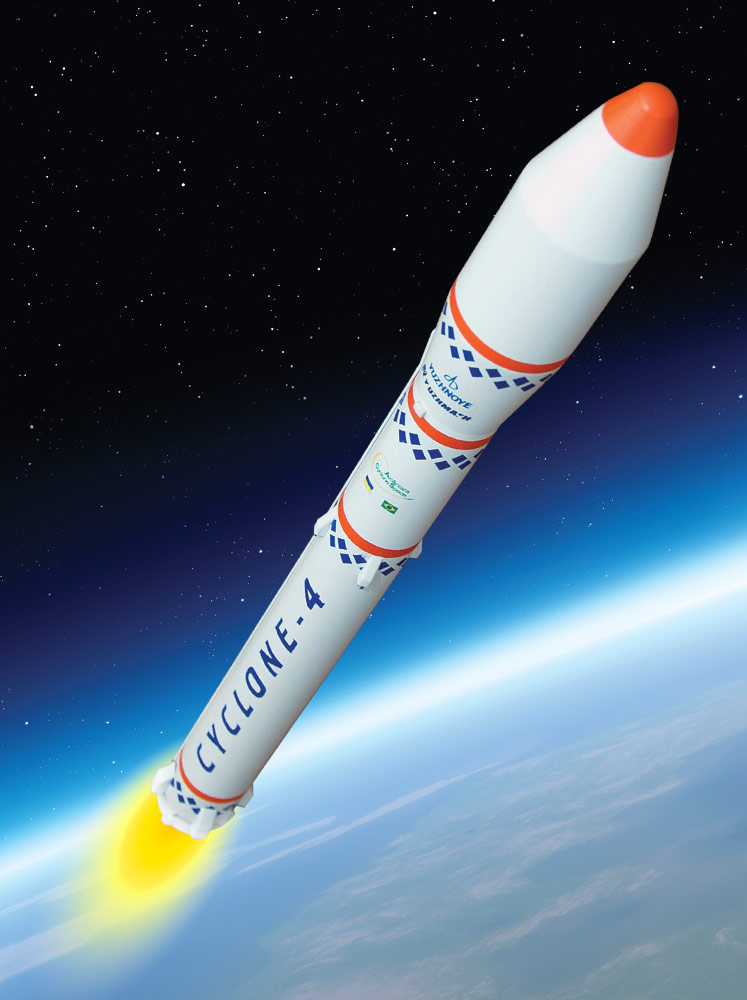
- Function: Carrier rocket
- Manufacturer: Yuzhnoye (design); Yuzhmash (manufacturing); Khartron (control system)
- Country of origin: Ukraine

Size
- Height: 39.95 m (131.1 ft)
- Diameter: 3.0 m (9.8 ft)
- Mass: 198,250 kg (437,070 lb)
- Stages: 3

Capacity

Payload to LEO
- Mass: 4,900 kg (10,800 lb)

Payload to GEO
- Mass: 500 kg (1,100 lb)

Associated rockets
- Family: R-36 / Tsyklon
- Based on: Tsyklon-3
- Comparable: Zenit

Launch history
- Status: Cancelled
- Launch sites: Alcântara ACS Pad

First stage – 11K69
- Powered by: 1 × RD-261 + RD-855 Vernier engine
- Maximum thrust: 2,970 kN (303 tf)
- Specific impulse: 300.4 s (2.946 km/s)
- Burn time: 119 seconds
- Propellant: N_{2}O_{4} / UDMH

Second stage – 11S692
- Powered by: 1 × RD-262 + RD-856 Vernier engine
- Maximum thrust: 995 kN (101.5 tf)
- Specific impulse: 314 s (3.08 km/s)
- Burn time: 162 seconds
- Propellant: N_{2}O_{4} / UDMH

Third stage
- Powered by: 1 × RD-861K
- Maximum thrust: 76 kN (7.8 tf)
- Specific impulse: 325 s (3.19 km/s)
- Burn time: 450 seconds
- Propellant: N_{2}O_{4} / UDMH

The Tsyklon-4, also known as Tsiklon-4 and Cyclone-4, was a Ukrainian carrier rocket which was being developed for commercial satellite launches. Derived from the Tsyklon-3, it had a new third stage, a larger payload fairing, and a modernised flight control system compared to its predecessor. The control system had been developed by JSC Khartron.

== Specifications ==
Tsyklon-4 was a three-stage-to-orbit expendable launch system, built on the successful Tsyklon-3 rocket and using improved versions of that rocket's first two stages. The new features were mostly in the newly developed third stage:

- The third stage has three times the propellant capacity of Tsyklon-3
- The new rocket engine RD-861K with multiple ignition capability (3 to 5 times)
- A modern western-like control system capable of precise orbit injections
- A new fairing derived from Ariane 4 is under development. It has a diameter of 4 metres (13 ft), with controlled temperature and cleanness conditions inside

Tsyklon-4 would have improved the fuelling system, allowing safe capture of toxic vapours from the vehicle's hypergolic propellant system.

The launch system would have been able to deliver up to 5,250 kg (11,570 lb) to a 185 km (115 mi) orbit, 4,900 kg (10,800 lb) to a 400 km (250 mi) orbit, or 500 kg (1,100 lb) to a geosynchronous orbit.

== Development history ==
Development began in 2002, with the maiden flight aimed for 2006. Following a series of production delays, this launch date slipped, and was estimated to occur some time after 2015.

Tsyklon-4 had been planned to launch from a proposed launch pad at the Alcântara Launch Center in Brazil, which would have given the rocket access to all orbital regimes. However, Brazil backed out of the partnership with Ukraine in 2015, citing concerns over the project budget, the ongoing financial situation in both countries, and the future of the commercial launch market. Yuzhnoye began developing a two-stage derivative of Tsyklon-4, the Cyclone-4M, for Maritime Launch Services, a Canadian launch service provider. The new rocket was originally scheduled to be in service by 2020, though this date has been repeatedly pushed due to construction delays at the Canso launch site. Construction is currently estimated to be complete by 2024 or 2025. According to a 2021 press release, the first flight of Cyclone-4M was planned to take place at Canso in 2023; however, it failed to eventuate.

== See also ==
- Tsyklon-2
- Tsyklon-3
- Cyclone-4M
- Kosmos (rocket family)
- Zenit (rocket family)
