= Yuzhmashavia =

Ukrainian airline

| IATA | ICAO | Call sign |
|---|---|---|
| - | UMK | YUZMASH |
- Founded: 1985
- Fleet size: 6
- Headquarters: Dnipro, Ukraine
- Website: yuzmashair.com.ua (defunct)

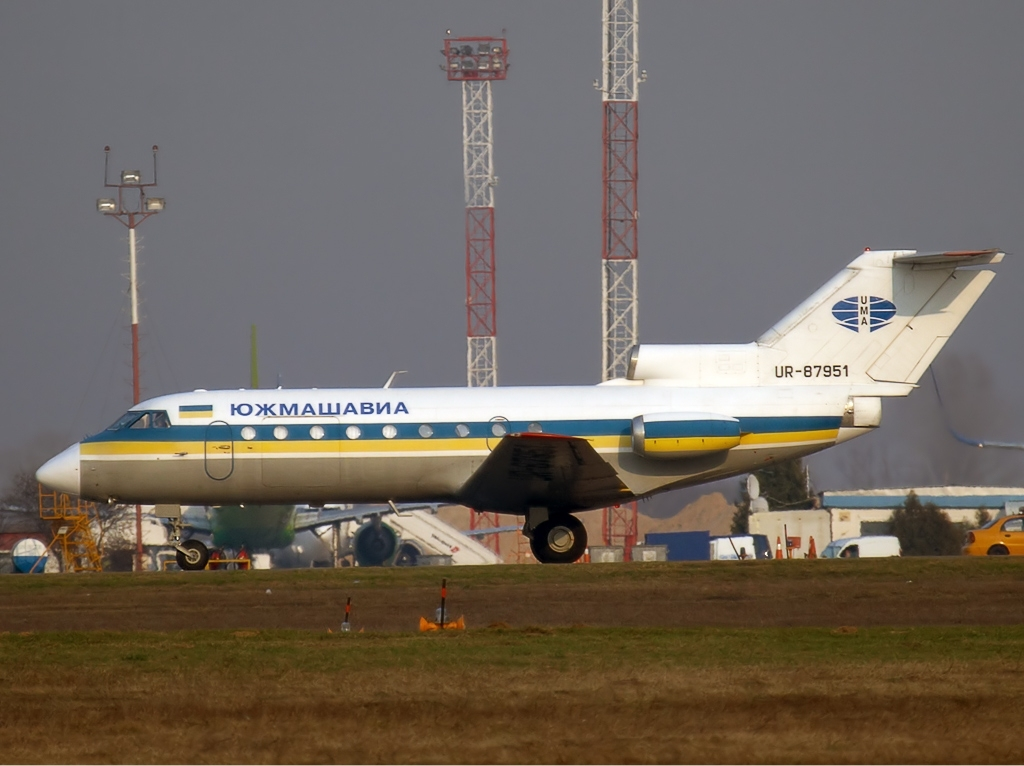
Yak-40 of Yuzhmashavia, 2009

Yuzhmashavia (Ukrainian: Авіаційна транспортна компанія «Южмашавіа»: Air Transport Company 'Yuzhmashavia') is an airline based in Dnipro, Ukraine, and was established in 1985, originally as the flying division of the Southern Mechanical Engineering Plant (Yuzhmash), operating charter passenger and cargo services from 1993. Yuzhmashavia has also been noted for performing international airfreight operations, delivering cargo to destinations across Europe, the Middle East, and North Africa. It primarily operates outside of Ukraine, and is one of few Ukrainian airlines that does so, alongside Air Urga and Antonov Airlines. Yuzmashavia suspended operations in 2021; its current status as of 2024 is described as "Restarting".

== History ==
Yuzhmashavia was established as Air Transport Company Yuzmashavia in 1985. It was one of the first airlines to register in Ukraine following the collapse of the Soviet Union.

In August 2017, the airline restored an Ilyushin Il-76T aircraft that had been inactive since 2014 and was parked in the Bila Tserkva aerodrome. It completed its successful test flight on 15 August 2017. In April 2019, the Yuzmashavia fleet consisted of 2 Ilyushin Il-76. In March 2020, the airline entered into a memorandum with Flight Solution Sp.z.o.o., a Polish company that specialises in refueling, in which the two would invest in the aviation industry through the joint construction of a refueling complex and cargo terminal at Dnipropetrovsk Airport. Yuzhmashavia also owns land at the airport that in early 2020, was identified as needing to be acquired by the regional administration as part of the airport's reconstruction project.

Its licence seems to have since been revoked, "and the airline stopped operating in 2021. It hopes to restart operations".
