= YF-73 =

Chinese rocket engine

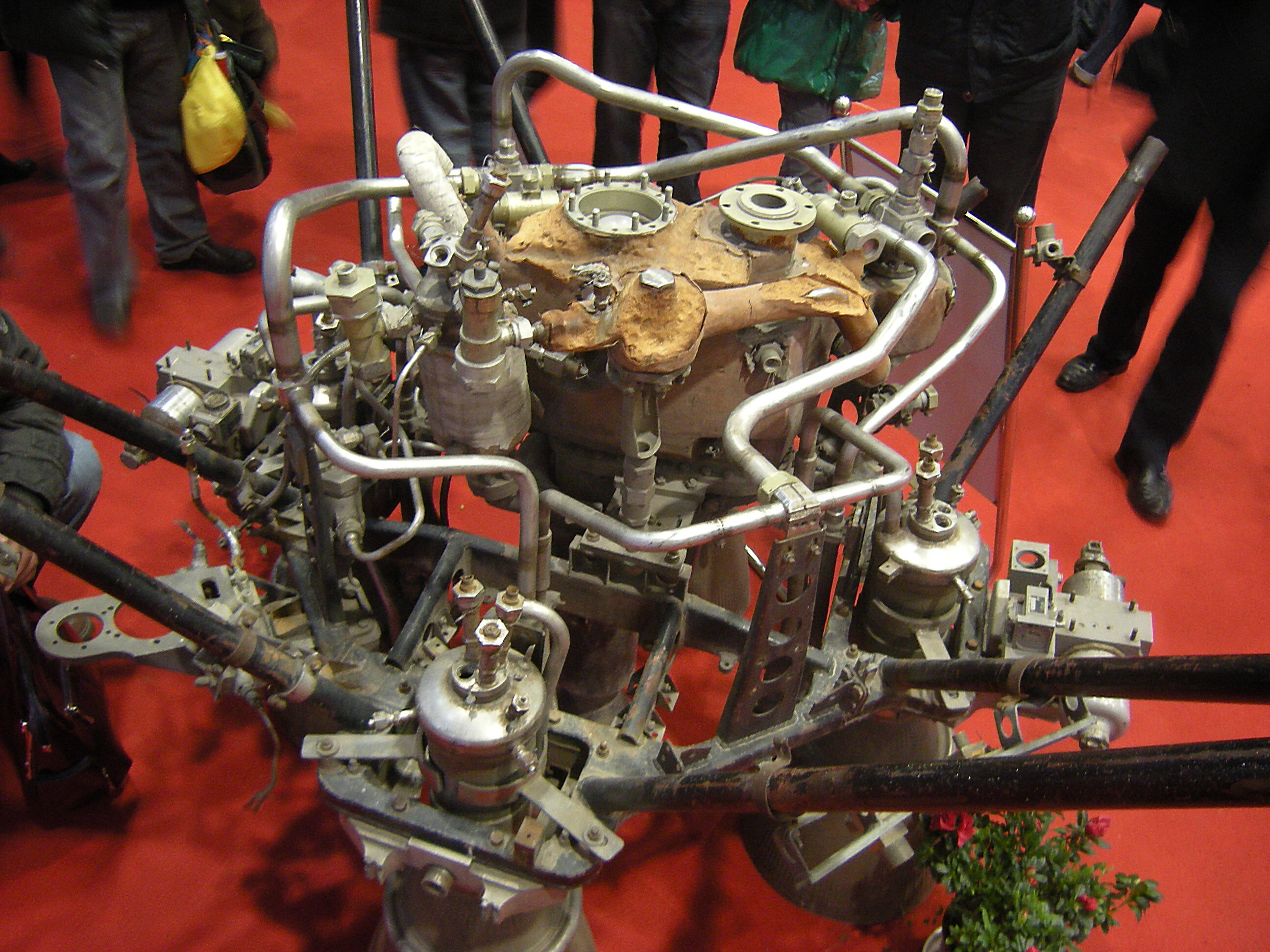
- Country of origin: China
- First flight: 1984-01-29
- Last flight: 2000-05-26
- Designer: Beijing Aerospace Propulsion Institute
- Manufacturer: China Academy of Launch Vehicle Technology (CALT)
- Associated LV: Long March 3
- Successor: YF-75
- Status: Retired

Liquid-fuel engine
- Propellant: Liquid oxygen / Liquid hydrogen
- Mixture ratio: 5.00
- Cycle: Gas-generator

Configuration
- Chamber: 4
- Nozzle ratio: 40

Performance
- Thrust, vacuum: 44.15 kilonewtons (9,930 lb_{f})
- Chamber pressure: 2,590 kPa (25.9 bar)
- Specific impulse, vacuum: 420 seconds (4.1 km/s)
- Burn time: 800 seconds (13 min)

Dimensions
- Length: 1.44 metres (4 ft 9 in)
- Diameter: 2.2 metres (7 ft 3 in)
- Dry mass: 236 kilograms (520 lb)

Used in
- Long March 3 H8 third stage

The YF-73 was China's first successful cryogenic liquid hydrogen fuel and liquid oxygen oxidizer gimballed engine. It was used on the Long March 3 H8 third stage, running on the simple gas generator cycle and with a thrust of 44.15 kilonewtons (9,930 lb_{f}). It had four hinge mounted nozzles that gimbaled each on one axis to supply thrust vector control and was restart capable. It used cavitating flow venturis to regulate propellant flows. The gas generator also incorporated dual heat exchangers that heated hydrogen gas, and supplied helium from separate systems to pressurize the hydrogen and oxygen tanks. The engine was relatively underpowered for its task and the start up and restart procedures were unreliable. Thus, it was quickly replaced by the YF-75.

== History ==
In October 1970 the Beijing Aerospace Propulsion Institute was tasked with developing a 39 kN (8,800 lbf) prototype rocket engine burning liquid hydrogen and liquid oxygen. It settled on a pump-fed gas generator design. The prototype was successfully fire tested for 20 seconds on January 25, 1975. In March of the same year, China officially initiated "Project 311" to begin engineering work for the first Chinese cryogenic engine, which was named YF-73. It debuted on April 8, 1984, when it sent the first geosynchronous communications satellite experiment, the Dong Fang Hong 2 to geosynchronous orbit. It flew 13 times with 3 failures and was last used on May 26, 2000. It was replaced by the more capable YF-75, which increased payload from 1.5 t (3,300 lb) to over 2.6 t (5,700 lb) and significantly improved reliability.
