= RD-250 =

Rocket engine

RD-250 (РД-250)
- Country of origin: Soviet Union
- First flight: December 16th, 1965
- Designer: OKB-456
- Manufacturer: PA Yuzhmash
- Associated LV: R-36, Tsyklon-2 and Tsyklon-3
- Status: Out of Production

Liquid-fuel engine
- Propellant: N_{2}O_{4} / UDMH
- Mixture ratio: 2.6
- Cycle: Gas-generator

Configuration
- Chamber: 2

Performance
- Thrust, vacuum: 882 kN (198,000 lbf)
- Thrust, sea-level: 788 kN (177,000 lbf)
- Chamber pressure: 8.33 MPa (1,208 psi)
- Specific impulse, vacuum: 301 s (2.95 km/s)
- Specific impulse, sea-level: 270 s (2.6 km/s)

Dimensions
- Dry mass: 788 kg (1,737 lb)

Used in
- R-36, Tsyklon-2 and Tsyklon-3 first stage

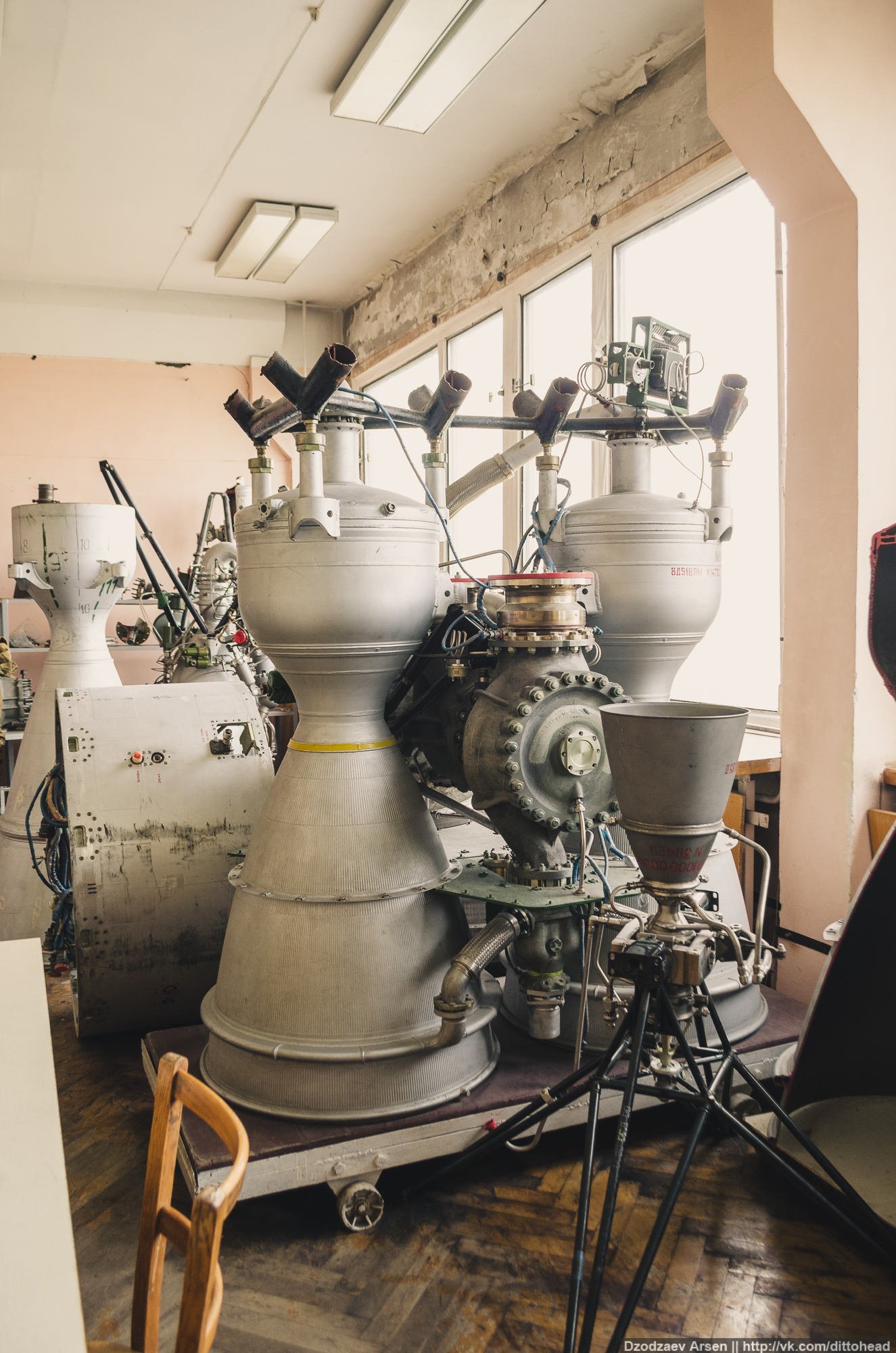

The RD-250 (Russian: Ракетный Двигатель-250, romanized: Raketnyy Dvigatel-250, lit. 'Rocket Engine 250', GRAU index: 8D518) is the base version of a dual-nozzle family of liquid-fuel rocket engines, burning a hypergolic mixture of unsymmetrical dimethylhydrazine (UDMH) fuel with dinitrogen tetroxide (N_{2}O_{4}) oxidizer in a gas-generator open cycle. The RD-250 was developed by OKB-456 for Yangel's PA Yuzhmash ICBM, the R-36 (8K67). Its variations were also used on the Tsyklon-2 and Tsyklon-3 launch vehicles. It was supposed to be used on the Tsyklon-4, but since the cancellation of the project it should be considered as out of production. Three engines from this family bundled together make the corresponding RD-251 propulsion module.

== Versions ==
The engine has seen different versions made:

- RD-250 (GRAU index: 8D518): Base engine of the family. Used on the R-36. A bundle of three RD-250 form the RD-251 cluster.
- RD-250P (GRAU index: 8D518P): Improved version of the RD-250. Used on the R-36P. A bundle of three RD-250P form the RD-251P cluster.
- RD-250M (GRAU index: 8D518M): Improved version of the RD-250P. Used on the R-36-O. A bundle of three RD-250M form the RD-251M cluster.
- RD-250PM (GRAU index: 8D518PM): Improved version of the RD-250M. Used on the Tsyklon-3. A bundle of three RD-250PM form the RD-261 cluster.
- RD-252 (GRAU index: 8D724): Vacuum optimized version of the RD-250. Used on the R-36 and Tsyklon-2 second stages.
- RD-262 (GRAU index: 11D26): Improved version of the RD-252. Used on the Tsyklon-3 second stages.

== Modules ==
Some of these engines were bundled into modules of multiple engines. The relevant modules and auxiliary engines are:

- RD-251 (GRAU index: 8D723): A module comprising three RD-250. Propulsion module of the R-36 (8K67) first stage.
- RD-251P (GRAU index: 8D723P): A module comprising three RD-250P. Propulsion module of the R-36P (8K68) first stage.
- RD-251M (GRAU index: 8D723M): A module comprising three RD-250M. Propulsion module of the R-36-O (8K69) and Tsyklon-2 first stage.
- RD-261 (GRAU index: 11D69): A module comprising three RD-250PM. Propulsion module of the Tsyklon-3 first stage.

== Comparison ==
RD-250 Family of Engines
Engine	RD-250	RD-250P	RD-250M	RD-250PM	RD-252	RD-262
GRAU	8D518	8D518P	8D518M	8D518PM	8D724	11D26
Module	RD-251	RD-251P	RD-251M	RD-261	N/A	N/A
Module GRAU	8D723	8D723P	8D723M	11D69	N/A	N/A
Development	1962-1966	1967-1968	1966-1968	1968-1970	1962-1966	1968-1970
Propellant	N_{2}O_{4}/UDMH					
Combustion chamber pressure	8.336 MPa (1,209.0 psi)				8.924 MPa (1,294.3 psi)	
Thrust, vacuum	881.6 kN (198,200 lbf)	881.6 kN (198,200 lbf)	881.6 kN (198,200 lbf)	881.7 kN (198,200 lbf)	940.8 kN (211,500 lbf)	941.4 kN (211,600 lbf)
Thrust, sea level	788.5 kN (177,300 lbf)	788.5 kN (177,300 lbf)	788.5 kN (177,300 lbf)	788.7 kN (177,300 lbf)	N/A	N/A
I_{sp}, vacuum	301 s (2.95 km/s)	301 s (2.95 km/s)	301 s (2.95 km/s)	301.4 s (2.956 km/s)	317.6 s (3.115 km/s)	318 s (3.12 km/s)
I_{sp}, sea level	270 s (2.6 km/s)	270 s (2.6 km/s)	270 s (2.6 km/s)	269.6 s (2.644 km/s)	N/A	N/A
Length	2,600 mm (100 in)	2,600 mm (100 in)	2,600 mm (100 in)	N/A	2,190 mm (86 in)	2,190 mm (86 in)
Diameter	1,000 mm (39 in)	1,000 mm (39 in)	1,000 mm (39 in)	N/A	2,590 mm (102 in)	2,590 mm (102 in)
Dry weight	728 kg (1,605 lb)	728 kg (1,605 lb)	728 kg (1,605 lb)	N/A	715 kg (1,576 lb)	715 kg (1,576 lb)
Use	R-36 (8K67) 1st stage	R-36P (8K67P) 1st stage	R-36-O (8K67-O) and Tsyklon-2 1st stage	Tsyklon-3 1st stage	R-36, R36P, R-36-O, Tsyklon-2 2nd stage	Tsyklon-3 2nd stage

== Possible technological transfer to North Korea ==
Several experts think that technology from the RD-250 engine could have been transferred to North Korea from Russia. This transfer would explain the rapid progress of North Korea in the development of two new missiles: the intermediate-range Hwasong-12 and the intercontinental ballistic missile (ICBM), Hwasong-14. Due to complexity of the technology involved in this type of engine, modifications or reverse engineering seem difficult to achieve. Thus it is believable that complete hardware could have been bought on black market and directly shipped to North Korea, by Russia or Ukraine. Conversely, there is analysis (made by two Ukrainian authors) suggesting an alternative mechanism for North Korea to receive R-36 missile engines, or an entire missile, from USSR or Russia.

== See also ==
- R-36 (missile) - ICBM for which this engine was originally developed.
- Tsyklon-2 - launch vehicle based on the R-36.
- Tsyklon-3 - Three stage launch vehicle developed from the Tsyklon-2.
- Cyclone-4M - launch vehicle based on the R-36
- liquid-fuel rocket
