= YF-130 =

Chinese rocket engine

- Country of origin: China
- Manufacturer: Academy of Aerospace Liquid Propulsion Technology
- Application: Long March 9
- Status: Under development

Liquid-fuel engine
- Propellant: Liquid oxygen / Kerosene
- Mixture ratio: 2.62
- Cycle: Staged combustion
- Pumps: 1

Configuration
- Chamber: 2

Performance
- Thrust, sea-level: ~5,000 kilonewtons (1,100,000 lbf)
- Thrust-to-weight ratio: 78
- Chamber pressure: 22 MPa (3,200 psi)
- Specific impulse: 308

Dimensions
- Length: ~4.3 m (14 ft)
- Diameter: ~3–3.3 m (9.8–10.8 ft)
- Dry mass: ~6.5 t (6.4 long tons; 7.2 short tons)

Used in
- Long March 9 First stage and booster

The YF-130 is a Chinese rocket engine fueled by LOX and kerosene in an oxidizer-rich staged combustion cycle currently in development. It has been designed to reach around 500 tonnes of thrust and it will power the super heavy Long March 9 rocket.

== History ==
Chinese researchers completed a "half-system on full working condition" test of a YF-130 engine in March 2021, and expected to finish a whole-system test verification by the end of the year. Full system test has been successfully completed on November 6, 2022.
