= Vernier thruster =

Rocket engines for maneuvering

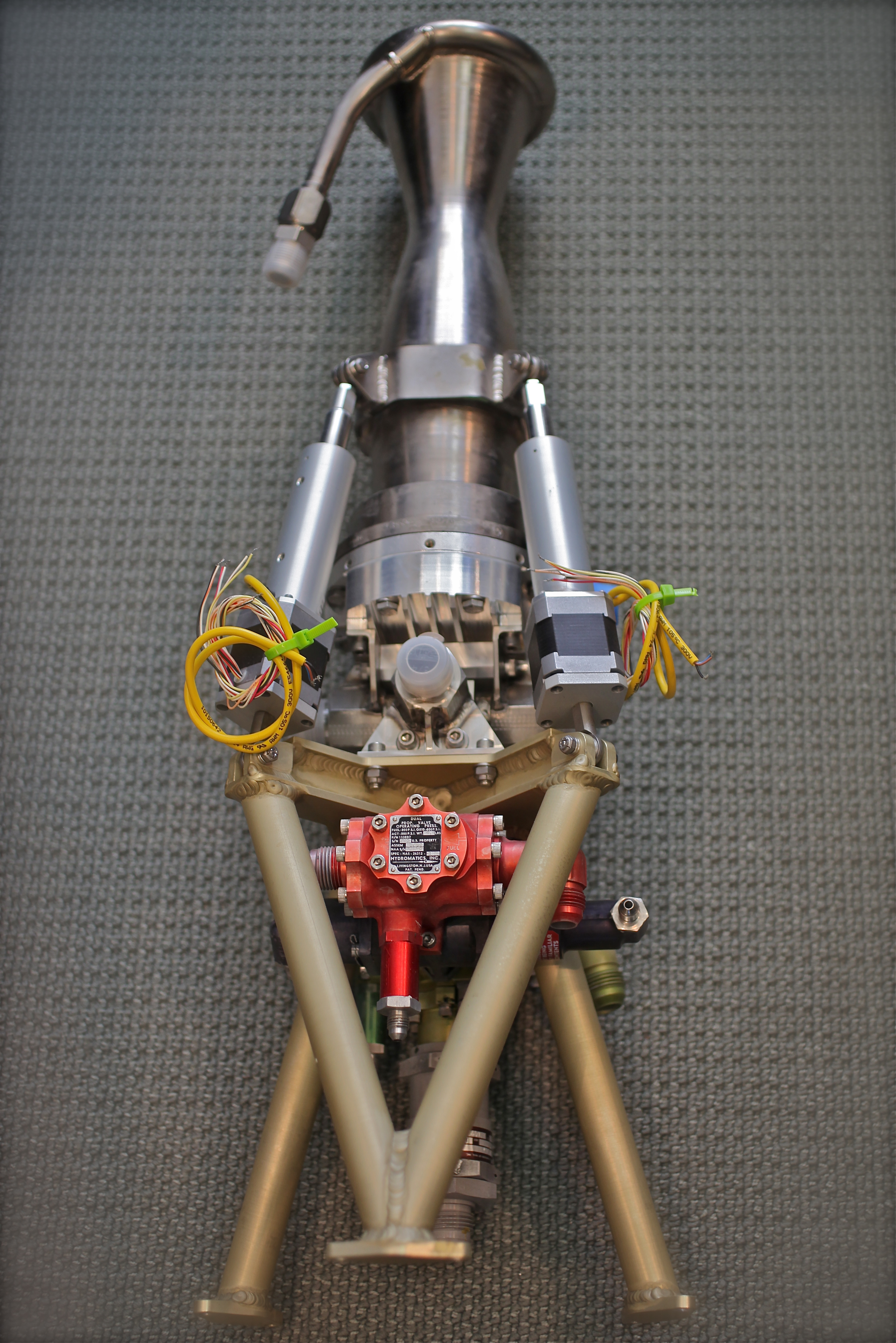
A 1960s Mercury-Atlas vernier thruster

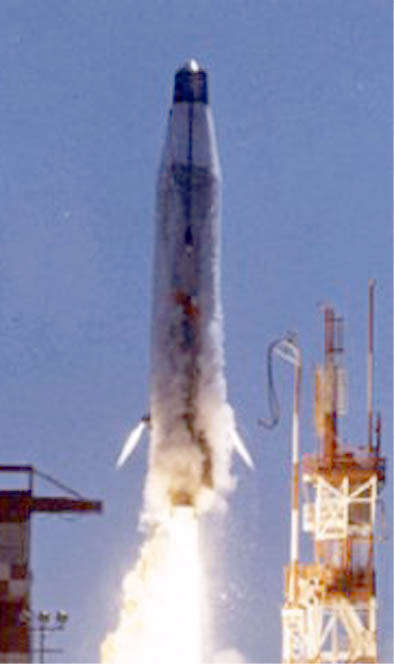
Vernier thrusters on the side of an Atlas missile can be seen emitting diagonal flames.

A vernier thruster is a rocket engine used on a spacecraft or launch vehicle for fine adjustments to the attitude or velocity. Depending on the design of a craft's maneuvering and stability systems, it may simply be a smaller thruster complementing the main propulsion system, or it may complement larger attitude control thrusters, or may be a part of the reaction control system. The name is derived from vernier calipers (named after Pierre Vernier) which have a primary scale for gross measurements, and a secondary scale for fine measurements.

Vernier thrusters are used when a heavy spacecraft requires a wide range of different thrust levels for attitude or velocity control, as for maneuvering during docking with other spacecraft.

On space vehicles with two sizes of attitude control thrusters, the main ACS (Attitude Control System) thrusters are used for larger movements, while the verniers are reserved for smaller adjustments.

Due to their weight and the extra plumbing required for their operation, vernier rockets are seldom used in new designs. Instead, as modern rocket engines gained better control, larger thrusters could also be fired for very short pulses, resulting in the same change of momentum as a longer thrust from a smaller thruster.

Vernier thrusters are used in rockets such as the R-7 for vehicle maneuvering because the main engine is fixed in place. For earlier versions of the Atlas rocket family (prior to the Atlas III), in addition to maneuvering, the verniers were used for roll control, although the booster engines could also perform this function. After main engine cutoff, the verniers would execute solo mode and fire for several seconds to make fine adjustments to the vehicle attitude. The Thor/Delta family also used verniers for roll control but were mounted on the base of the thrust section flanking the main engine.

== Examples ==
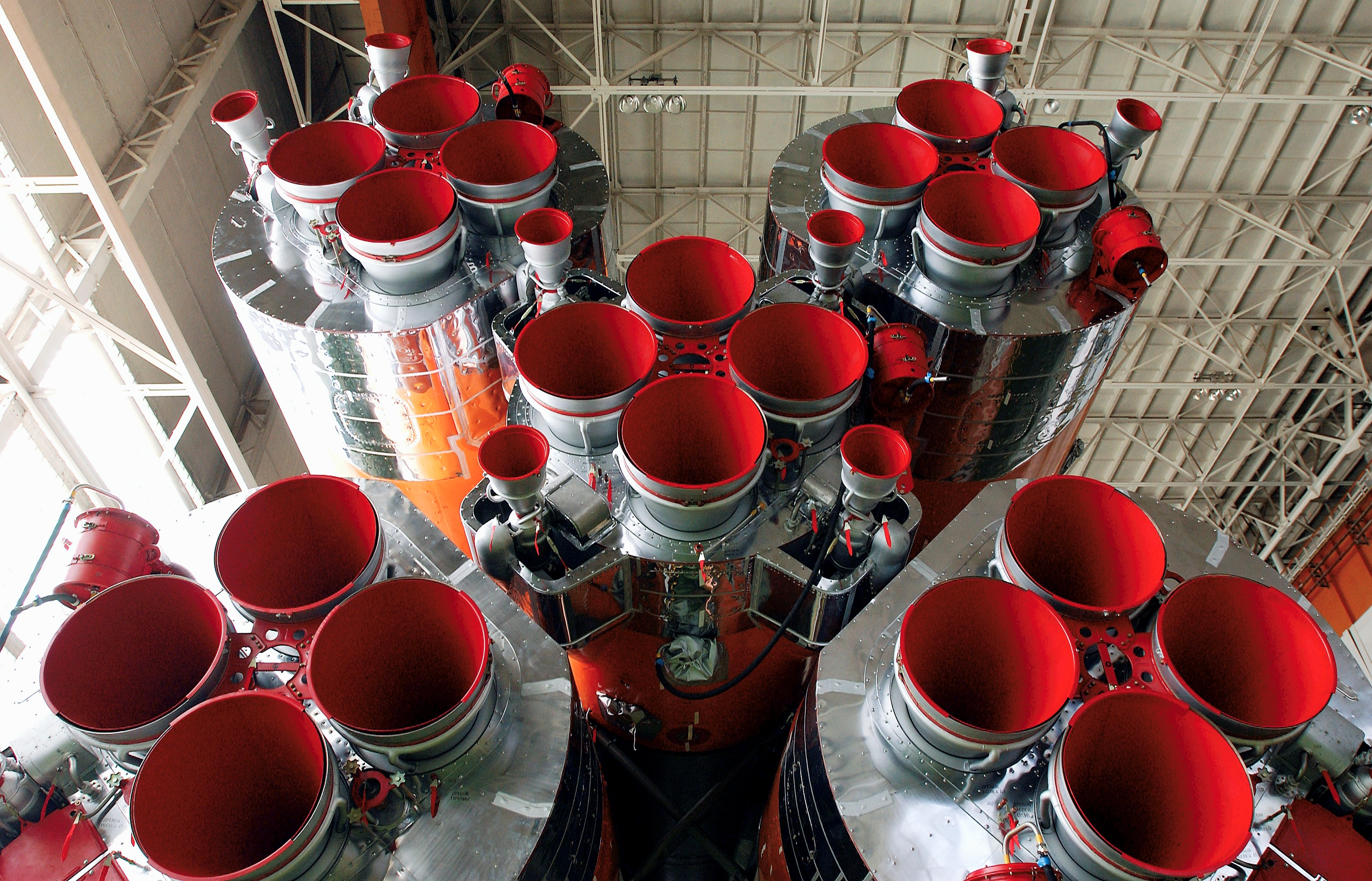
The first- and second-stage engines of a Soyuz, showing the four RD-107 modules with twin vernier nozzles each, and the central RD-108 with four steerable vernier thrusters

- The R-7 rocket family, with over 1700 successful launches to date, still depends on the S1.358000 vernier thrusters in its first and second stage. Most of the larger Soviet missiles and launch vehicles also used verniers. Examples include the RD-8 on the Zenit rocket family, the RD-855 and RD-856 on the R-36, and the RD-0214 on the Proton rocket family.
- On the SM-65 Atlas, the LR-101 verniers were used for roll control and to fine-tune the vehicle attitude after the main engine cutoff. The Delta II and Delta III rocket also used the LR-101 for vehicle roll maneuver since one engine cannot do a roll maneuver (although the later GEM 46 had thrust vectoring nozzle, only three were equipped with this feature and only ignited a brief moment during the ascent).
- The Space Shuttle had six vernier engines or thrusters in its "Vernier Reaction Control System" (VRCS). The VRCS could also deliver a gentle steady thrust. This was regularly used to boost the International Space Station while docked: for example during STS-130 commander George Zamka and pilot Terry Virts fired Endeavour's VRCS for a duration of 33 minutes to attain an orbit between 180.5 and 190.0 nmi (334.3 and 351.9 km).

== See also ==
- Cold gas thruster
- Space propulsion
- Vernier throttle
