= Pivdenmash =

Ukrainian rocket manufacturer

PA Southern Machine-Building Plant named after O.M. Makarov
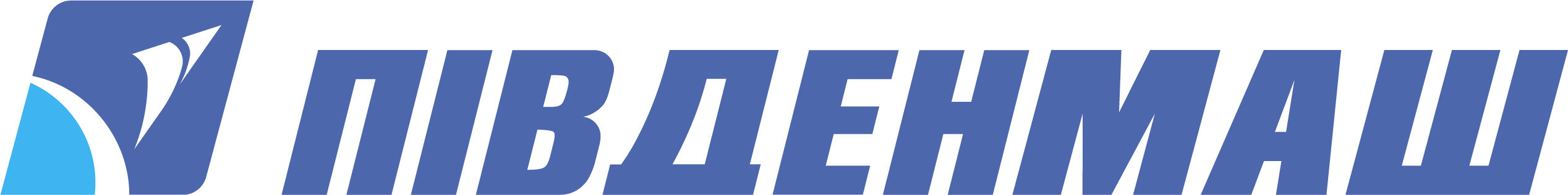

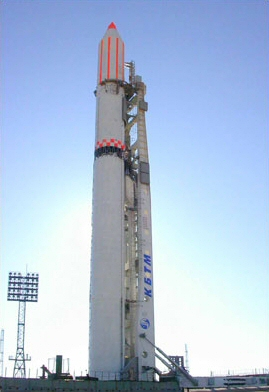
- Zenit-2 launch vehicle ready for launch at Baikonur
- Trade name: PivdenMash, Zenit
- Native name: Південмаш
- Romanized name: Pivdenmash
- Formerly: Russian: Южмаш, romanized: Yuzhmash, ЮМЗ (YuMZ)
- Company type: State-owned enterprise
- Industry: Manufacturing
- Genre: Defense industry Space industry Aerospace industry
- Founded: 21 July 1944; 81 years ago in Dnipropetrovsk, USSR
- Headquarters: 1, Kryvorizka street, Dnipro, Ukraine
- Products: Launch vehicles, ballistic missiles, rocket engines, spacecraft, landing gears, tractors, trolleybuses, castings, forgings
- Number of employees: 7,000 (2017)
- Parent: State Space Agency of Ukraine
- Website: yuzhmash.com

The State Enterprise "Production Amalgamation 'Southern Machine-Building Plant named after O.M. Makarov'", officially abbreviated as Pivdenmash (Ukrainian: Південмаш) and previously as Yuzhmash (Russian: Южмаш, lit. 'Southern Mechanical Engineering'), is a Ukrainian state-owned aerospace and defence manufacturer. Prior to 1991, it was a Soviet state-owned factory.

Pivdenmash produces spacecraft, launch vehicles (rockets), liquid-propellant rockets, landing gears, castings, forgings, tractors, tools, and industrial products. The company is headquartered in Dnipro, and reports to the State Space Agency of Ukraine. It works with international aerospace partners in 23 countries.

== History ==
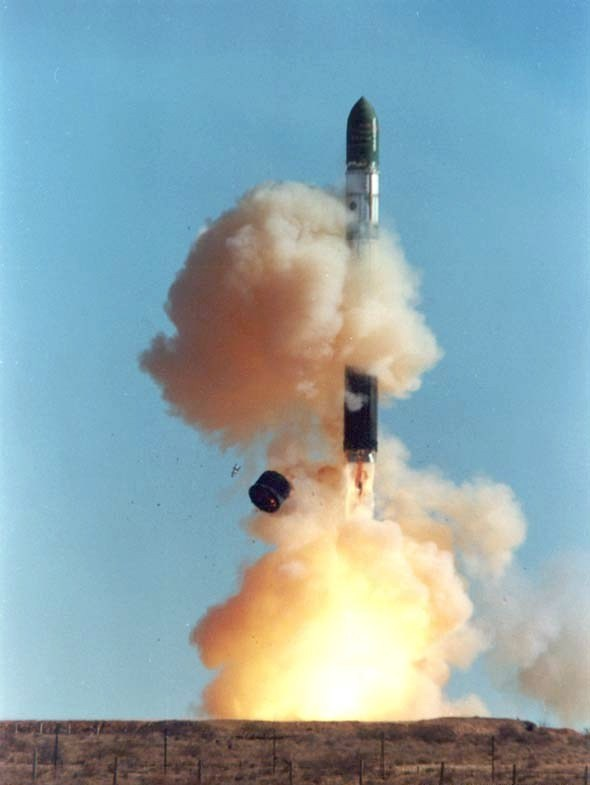
A modern Dnepr rocket, based on the R-36 ICBM

Pivdenmash operated initially as "plant 586" in the Soviet Union. In 1954, Soviet aviation engineer Mikhail Yangel established the autonomous design bureau designated OKB-586, from the former chief designer's division of plant 586. Yangel had previously headed OKB-1 (today RKK Energiya) and was primarily a supporter of storable propellant technology – unlike Sergei Korolev at OKB-1, who was a supporter of missiles using cryogenic propellants. To pursue development of ballistic missiles using storable liquid propellants, Mikhail Yangel had received authorization to convert the chief designer's division of the plant into an autonomous design bureau. Following this, OKB-586 was designated Southern Design Bureau (better known as KB Pivdenne) and plant 586 was renamed Southern Machine-Building Plant in 1966, with a focus on the design and production of ballistic missiles. The plant was later renamed Southern Machine-Building Production Union, or Yuzhmash (Ukraine).

Missiles produced at Pivdenmash included the first nuclear armed Soviet rocket R-5M (SS-3 'Shyster'), the R-12 Dvina (SS-4 'Sandal'), the R-14 Chusovaya (SS-5 'Skean'), the first widely deployed Soviet ICBM R-16 (SS-7 'Saddler'), the R-36 (SS-9 'Scarp'), the MR-UR-100 Sotka (SS-17 'Spanker'), and the R-36M (SS-18 'Satan'). During the Soviet era, the plant was capable of producing of up to 120 ICBMs a year. In the late 1980s, Pivdenmash was selected to be the main production facility of the RT-2PM2 Topol-M ICBM (SS-27 "Sickle B").

After the beginning of perestroika, demand for military production declined significantly, and the Pivdenmash product line was expanded to include non-military uses such as civilian machinery. One line of products added after 1992 are trolleybuses. Models include the articulated YuMZ T1 (1992–2008), its non-articulated brother YuMZ T2 (1993–2008) and more modern YuMZ E-186 (2005–2006) which features a low floor cabin. Leonid Kuchma, long-time chief manager (1986–1992) of the company, became the Prime Minister in 1992, and later President of Ukraine in 1994.

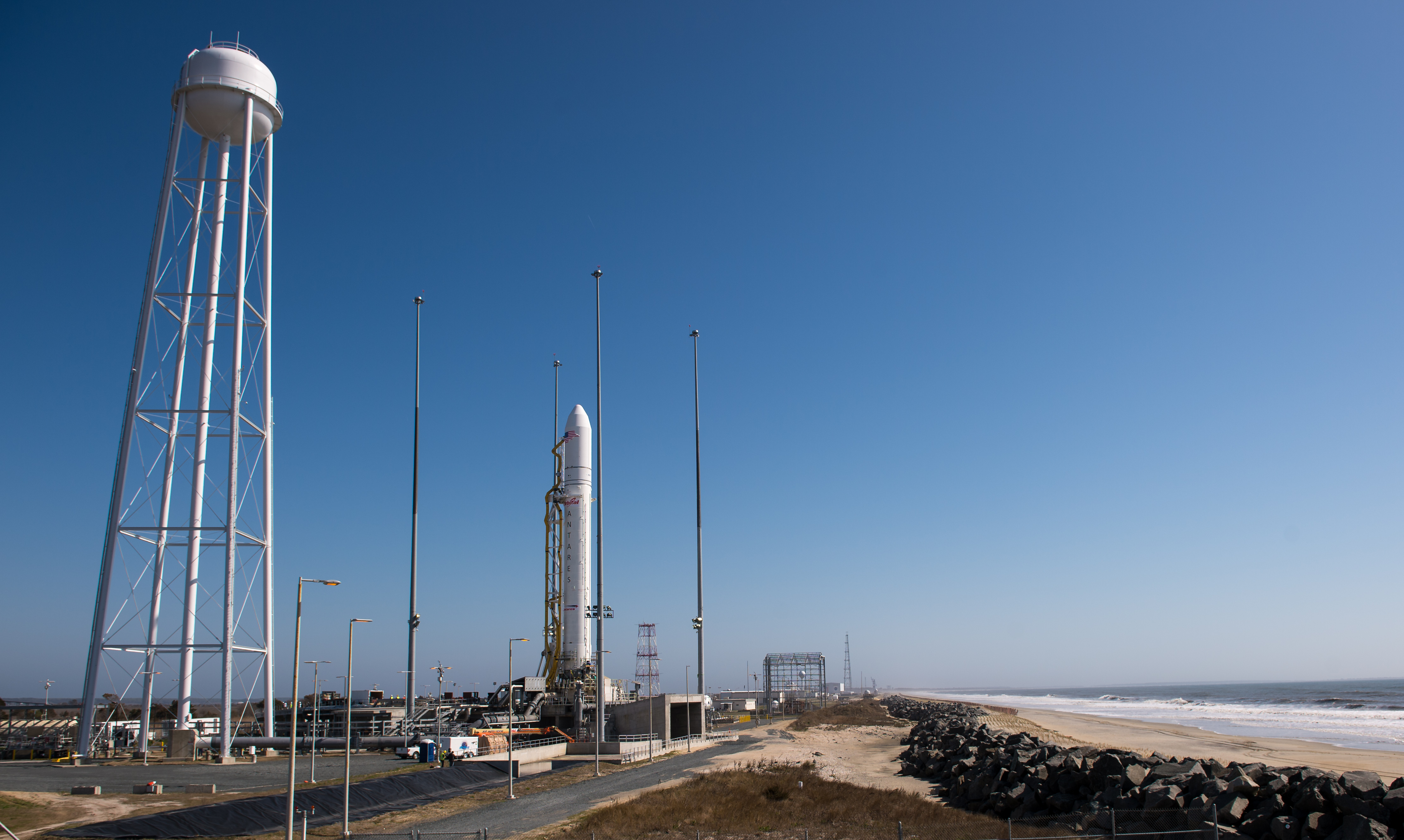
Pivdenmash' "Antares II" launch vehicle designed for NASA to deliver commercial cargo to the International Space Station

In addition to production facilities in Dnipro, Pivdenne Production Association includes the Pavlohrad Mechanical Plant, which specializes in producing solid-fuel missiles. Pivdenmash's importance was further bolstered by its links to Ukraine's former President Leonid Kuchma, who worked at Pivdenmash between 1975 and 1992. He was the plant's general manager from 1986 to 1992.

In February 2015, following a year of strained relations, Russia announced that it would sever its "joint program with Ukraine to launch Dnepr rockets and [was] no longer interested in buying Ukrainian Zenit boosters, deepening problems for [Ukraine's] space program and its struggling Pivdenmash factory". With the loss of Russian business some thought that the only hope for the company was increased international business which seemed unlikely in the time frame available. Bankruptcy seemed certain as of February 2015, but was averted.

On 14 August 2017, the Institute of International Strategic Studies issued a report presenting evidence that "North Korea has acquired a high-performance liquid-propellant engine from illicit networks in Russia and Ukraine", likely produced by Pivdenmash facilities. Both the company and the Ukrainian government denied the allegation.

In October 2016, An Antares 230 launch vehicle using a Pivdenmash core launched the Cygnus OA-5 mission from Wallops Island to deliver supplies to the ISS. This was Antares' return-to-flight following the failed Cygnus Orb-3 mission nearly two years earlier, resulting from a faulty AJ-26 engine. The vehicle was modified to utilize the NPO Energomash RD-181 engine, which has since performed flawlessly.

In December 2017, after a two-year hiatus, the final Zenit launch vehicle was launched by Roscosmos from Baikonur Cosmodrome to deliver AngoSat 1.

In February–March 2018, Pivdenmash announced plans to develop a testing platform for Hyperloop technology developed by Elon Musk and was scheduled for completion in 2019 in Dnipro, though the Minister of Infrastructure of Ukraine later cancelled this as an "absurd" project. Even so, by 2021, the group was reported to have partnerships with 23 countries, including Saudi Arabia.

In July 2022, during the Russian invasion of Ukraine, the Pivdenmash facility in Dnipro was struck by a Russian long-range cruise missile attack. The plant was targeted again during the October–November 2022 nationwide missile strikes on Ukraine on 17 November 2022.

On August 1, 2023, the final Antares 230+ lifted off from Wallops Flight Facility in Virginia with Cygnus NG-19 to resupply the International Space Station. Owing to engine unavailability and the inability of Pivdenmash to produce further first stages due to the Russian invasion of Ukraine, future Cygnus spacecraft will initially be launched aboard SpaceX's Falcon 9 launcher before transitioning to the Antares 330. This vehicle uses a new first stage developed by Firefly Aerospace and the existing second stage from the Antares 230+. Pivdenmash will no longer be involved in the design or manufacturing of this vehicle.

On November 21, 2024, the infrastructure was struck by a Russian non-nuclear IRBM (Intermediate Range Ballistic Missile).

== General Directors ==
- Oleksandr Makarov (1961–1986)
- Leonid Kuchma (1986–1992)
- Yuriy Alekseyev (1992–2005)
- Viktor Shchegol (2005–2014)
- Sergei Voit (2014–present)

== Structure ==
- Factory of missile and aviation aggregates (created in 2010 through organization)
- Pavlohrad Mechanical Factory (located in Pavlohrad)
- Dnipro Tractor Factory
- Factory of Technological Equipment
- Production Complex "Metalurhiya"
- Production Complex "Pivdenmashenergo"
- Construction and Installation Complex
- Sports Complex Meteor
- Social and domestic administration
  - Sanatoriums "Dubrava" (Bila Tserkva) and "Druzhba" (Alushta), Hotel Pivdennyi, Mashynobudivnykiv Palace of Culture
- Airline Pivdenmashavia

== Military and space industry ==
Pivdenmash is known for its military and space industry products, and earned the city of Dnipro the nickname of "Rocket City".

=== Missiles ===
The company had been the key missile producer for Soviet ICBM and space exploration programs. Historic and Pivdenmash launch systems included:

- the R-5 Pobeda — the Soviet Union's first nuclear armed missile
- the R-12 Dvina theatre ballistic missile
- the R-14 Chusovaya theatre ballistic missile
- the R-16 — the first widely deployed ICBM of the Soviet Union
- the R-36 (8K67) ICBM
- the RT-20P, the first mobile ICBM (not deployed)
- the R-36orb, the first ICBM with orbital warhead (not deployed)
- the R-36M ICBM family (converted to Dnepr rocket)
- the MR-UR-100 Sotka ICBM family
- the 15A11 missile for Perimeter system
- the RT-23 Molodets ICBM family
- the Hrim-2 mobile short-range ballistic missile system

=== Space launch vehicles ===
- Kosmos
- Dnepr
- Tsyklon (based on R-36/8K67)
  - Tsyklon-2
  - Tsyklon-3
  - Tsyklon-4
  - Cyclone-4M
- Zenit
- Boosters for Energia (based on Zenit first stage)

=== Rocket engines ===
- RD-843

=== Automatic nuclear-control system ===
- Dead Hand — A similar system existed in the U.S. known as the Emergency Rocket Communications System (ERCS)

== Vehicles manufacturing ==
Created in 1944 as Dnipropetrovsk Tractor Factory, it was later expanded.

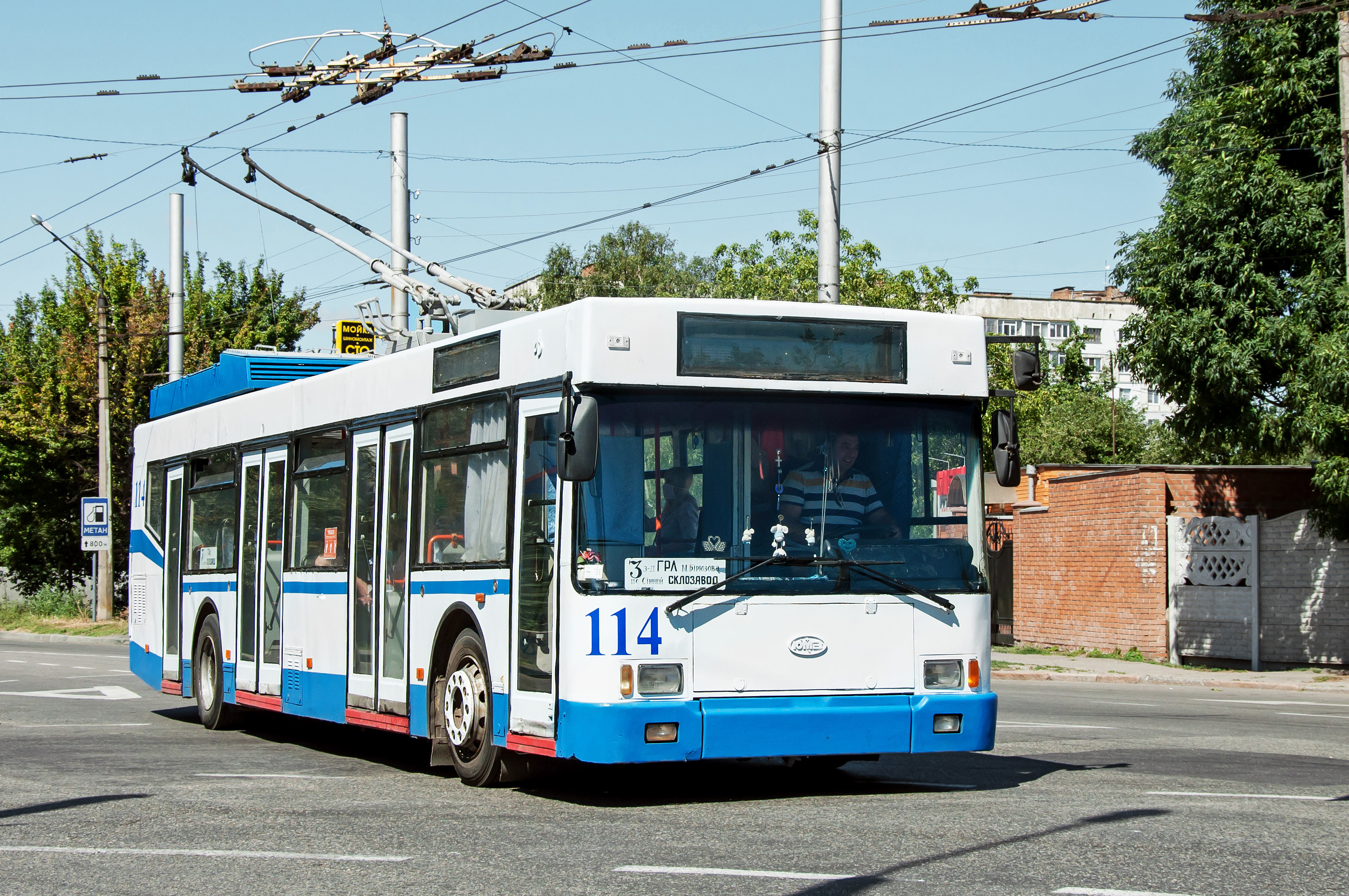
YuMZ E186

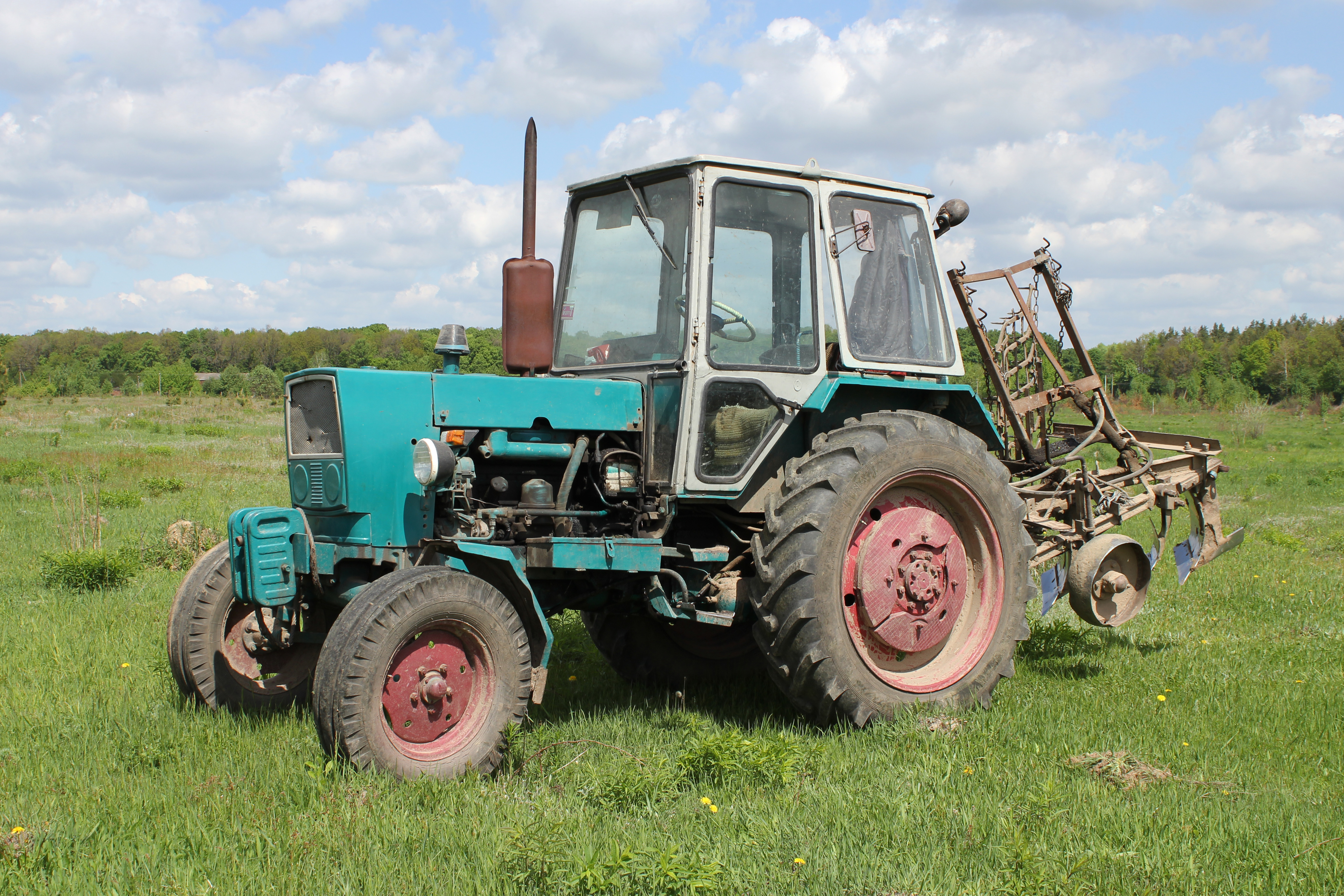
YuMZ-6KL

=== Trolleybuses ===
- YuMZ T1 (1992–1998, 2011)
- YuMZ T2 (1993–2011, 2022)
- YuMZ E186 (2003, 2005–2006)
- Dnipro E187 (2007–2008)
- YuMZ-5265 Megapolis (2010)
- Dnipro T103 (2013–2019)
- Dnipro T203 (2017–2024)

=== Tractors ===
- YuMZ-2 (1954–1958)
- YuMZ-5 (1957–1962)
- YuMZ-6 (1971–2001)
- YuMZ 8040.2
- YuMZ 8244.2
- YuMZ 8080

=== Harvesters ===
- Dnipro-350

== See also ==
- Pivdenne Design Bureau – major missile designer closely co-operating with Pivdenmash
- State Space Agency of Ukraine
