= Tsyklon-3 =

Soviet / Russian launch vehicle

Tsyklon-3 (Tsiklon-3)
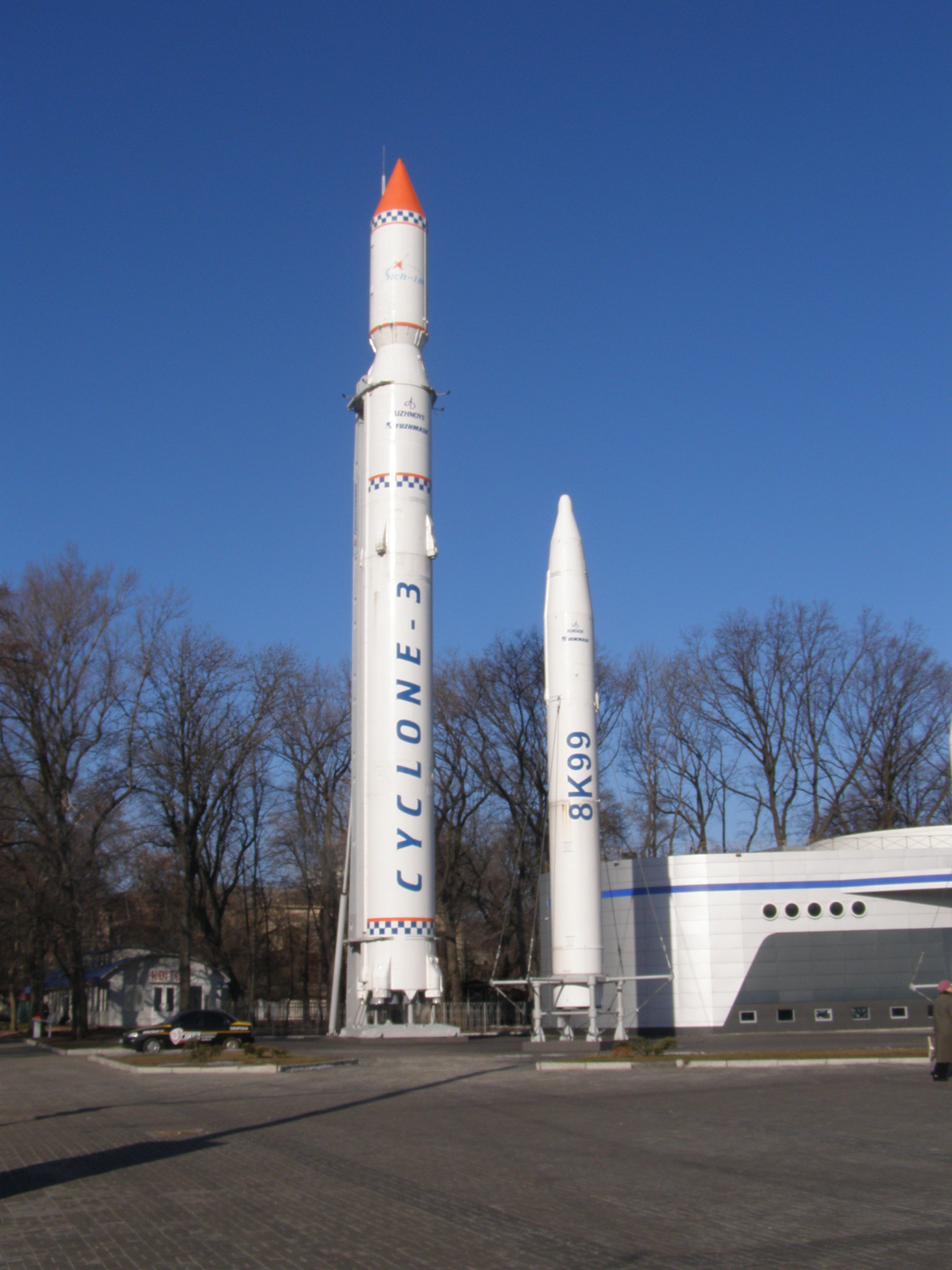
- Tsyklon-3 on display in downtown Dnipro
- Function: Carrier rocket
- Manufacturer: Yuzhmash
- Country of origin: Soviet Union

Size
- Height: 39.27 m (128.8 ft)
- Diameter: 3 m (9.8 ft)
- Mass: 189,000 kg (417,000 lb)
- Stages: 3

Capacity

Payload to low Earth orbit
- Mass: 4,100 kg (9,000 lb)

Associated rockets
- Family: R-36, Tsyklon
- Derivative work: Tsyklon-4, Cyclone-4M
- Comparable: Delta II

Launch history
- Status: Retired
- Launch sites: Plesetsk Cosmodrome LC-32
- Total launches: 122
- Success(es): 114
- Failure: 8
- First flight: 24 June 1977
- Last flight: 30 January 2009
- Carries passengers or cargo: Tselina; Meteor; Okean; Geo-IK; Strela

First stage – 11K69
- Powered by: 1 RD-261 module (3 RD-250PM engines)
- Maximum thrust: 3,032 kN (682,000 lb_{f})
- Specific impulse: 301 sec
- Burn time: 120 seconds
- Propellant: N_{2}O_{4} / UDMH

Second stage – 11S692
- Powered by: 1 RD-262
- Maximum thrust: 941 kN (212,000 lb_{f})
- Specific impulse: 318 sec
- Burn time: 160 seconds
- Propellant: N_{2}O_{4} / UDMH

Third stage – 11S693
- Powered by: 1 RD-861
- Maximum thrust: 78.7 kN (17,700 lb_{f})
- Specific impulse: 317 sec
- Burn time: 125 seconds
- Propellant: N_{2}O_{4} / UDMH

The Tsyklon-3, also known as Tsiklon-3 and Cyclone-3 (known as SL-14 by the United States DoD), GRAU index 11K68, was a Soviet, and subsequently Ukrainian orbital carrier rocket.

== Overview ==
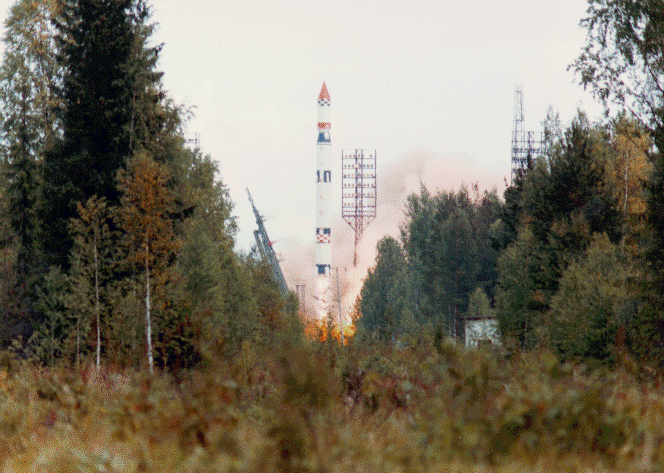
Tsyklon-3 launching a Meteor-3 satellite at Plesetsk Cosmodrome in August 1991

A derivative of the R-36 ICBM, and a member of the Tsyklon family, Tsyklon-3 made its maiden flight on 24 June 1977, and was retired on 30 January 2009. The Ukrainian-built Tsyklon rockets were retired in favour of future all-Russian carrier rockets, such as the Angara, and because they were fuelled by toxic hypergolic propellants.

== Successor ==
Ukraine was developing a commercial derivative of the Tsyklon-3, the Tsyklon-4. The development of Tsyklon-4 ended in 2015 after Ukraine's development partner Brazil pulled out of the project. Tsyklon-4 never made it to launch pad.

Another successor to the Tsyklon rockets, Cyclone-4M (based on Tsyklon-4 designs), is under development as of 2021 for use in the commercial market.

== Debris ==
=== 2013 loss of Ecuadorian satellite after impact with Tsyklon-3 space debris ===
On 23 May 2013 at approximately 05:38 UTC, the Ecuadorian satellite NEE-01 Pegaso passed very close to the spent upper stage of a 1985 Tsyklon-3 rocket over the Indian Ocean. While there was no direct collision between the satellite and upper stage, Pegaso is believed to have suffered a "glancing blow" after passing through a debris cloud around the Tsyklon stage and striking one of the small pieces. After the incident, the satellite was found to be "spinning wildly over two of its axes" and unable to communicate with its ground station. Efforts to reestablish control of Pegaso failed, and on 28 August 2013 the decision was made by EXA and the Ecuadorian government to declare the satellite lost.

=== Other Debris events ===
The Tsyklon-3 rocket body used to launch the Meteor 2-16 on 18 August 1987, has fragmented five times between 1988 and 2006 due in part to propellant left inside the vehicle, resulting in more than 100 pieces of debris many of which are still in orbit.

== See also ==
- Angara rocket
- Dnepr rocket
- Tsyklon
- Tsyklon-2
- Tsyklon-4
- Cyclone-4M
