= Tsyklon-2 =

Soviet-Ukrainian carrier rocket

Tsyklon-2 (Tsiklon-2/Tsyklon-M)
- Illustration of Tsyklon-2
- Function: Carrier rocket
- Manufacturer: Yuzhmash
- Country of origin: Soviet Union, later Ukraine

Size
- Height: 39.7 m (130 ft)
- Diameter: 3 m (9.8 ft)
- Mass: 182,000 kg (401,000 lb)
- Stages: 2

Capacity

Payload to low Earth orbit
- Mass: 2,820 kg (6,220 lb)

Associated rockets
- Family: R-36, Tsyklon
- Comparable: Delta II

Launch history
- Status: Retired
- Launch sites: Baikonur Cosmodrome LC-90
- Total launches: 106
- Success(es): 105
- Failure: 1
- First flight: 6 August 1969
- Last flight: 24 June 2006
- Carries passengers or cargo: IS-A/IS-P; RORSAT; EORSAT

First stage – 11S681
- Powered by: 1 RD-251
- Maximum thrust: 2,640 kN (590,000 lb_{f})
- Specific impulse: 301 sec
- Burn time: 120 seconds
- Propellant: N_{2}O_{4} / UDMH

Second stage – 11S682
- Powered by: 1 RD-252
- Maximum thrust: 940 kN (210,000 lb_{f})
- Specific impulse: 317 sec
- Burn time: 160 seconds
- Propellant: N_{2}O_{4} / UDMH

The Tsyklon-2 (Ukrainian: Циклон-2, lit. 'Cyclone-2'), also known as Tsiklon-2 and Tsyklon-M (known as SL-11 by the United States DoD), GRAU index 11K69, was a Soviet, later Ukrainian, orbital carrier rocket used from the 1960s to the late 2000s. The rocket had 106 launches, one suborbital and 105 orbital, with only one failure and 92 consecutive successful launches, from 27 December 1973 with the launch of Kosmos 626 to 25 June 2006 with the final flight of the Tsyklon-2, .

== History ==
A derivative of the R-36 ICBM, and a member of the Tsyklon family, the Tsyklon-2 made its maiden flight on 6 August 1969, and conducted 106 flights, the last one occurring on 24 June 2006. It was the most reliable Soviet/Russian carrier rocket ever used, and launched more than 100 times having failed only once, and the second most reliable carrier rocket overall, behind the Atlas II that was launched only 63 times. Along with other R-36 family member Tsyklon-3, the Tsyklon-2 was retired in favor of new-generation and all-Russian carrier rockets, such as the Angara and Soyuz-2.

== Description ==
Like the Tsyklon-3, the Tsyklon-2 was derived from the R-36 Scarp ICBM. However, it did not have a third stage, like the Tsyklon-3 did, also it was slightly shorter and had a lower weight mass when fueled.

== See also ==
- List of Tsyklon launches
- Angara rocket
- Dnepr rocket
- Tsyklon
