= Angara-1.2 =

Russian small-lift launch vehicle

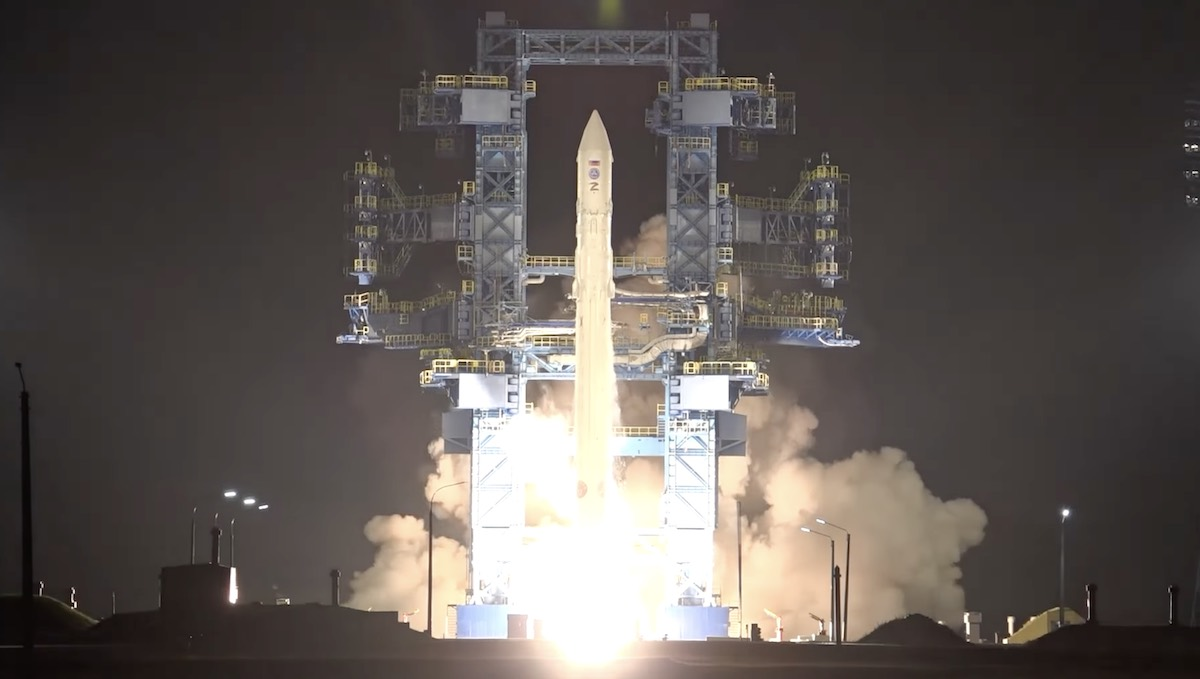
- Angara-1.2 during liftoff on its second flight
- Function: Small-lift launch vehicle
- Manufacturer: Khrunichev
- Country of origin: Russia

Size
- Height: 42.2 m (138 ft)
- Diameter: 2.9 m (9 ft 6 in)
- Mass: ~171.5 t (378,000 lb)
- Stages: 2

Capacity

Payload to LEO
- Altitude: 200 km (120 mi)
- Mass: 3,500 kg (7,700 lb)

Payload to SSO
- Mass: 2,400 kg (5,300 lb)

Payload to LEO
- Altitude: 1,500 km (930 mi)
- Mass: 1,600 kg (3,500 lb)

Associated rockets
- Family: Angara

Launch history
- Status: Active
- Launch sites: Plesetsk, Site 35
- Total launches: 7
- Success(es): 7
- First flight: 9 July 2014
- Last flight: 23 April 2026 (most recent)

First stage – URM-1
- Powered by: 1 × RD-191
- Maximum thrust: 1,920 kN (430,000 lb_{f})
- Specific impulse: 310.7 s (3.047 km/s)
- Burn time: 214 seconds
- Propellant: LOX / RP-1

Second stage – URM-2
- Powered by: 1 × RD-0124A
- Maximum thrust: 294.3 kN (66,200 lb_{f})
- Specific impulse: 359 s (3.52 km/s)
- Burn time: 424 seconds
- Propellant: LOX / RP-1

Angara-1.2 is a Russian two-stage small-lift launch vehicle designed to launch a payload of up to 3.5 t (7,700 lb) into low Earth orbit and up to 2.4 t (5,300 lb) into a sun-synchronous orbit. The height of the Angara-1.2 is about 41.5 m (136 ft), the launch mass of the rocket is about 171.5 t (378,000 lb). It is part of the Angara family of launch vehicles.

== Description ==
The Angara-1.2 rocket has two stages running on cryogenic fuel, the fuel is kerosene of the RG-1 naphthyl brand, and the oxidizer is liquid oxygen. Since the second stage does not have the possibility of re-activation to form the final orbit of the spacecraft being launched, it includes a detachable orbital launch unit "AM" (aggregate module) operating on high-boiling fuel dinitrogen tetroxide + UDMH "heptyl".

The design of the Angara-1.2 launch vehicle

=== First Stage ===
The first stage of the Angara-1.2 is a universal rocket module, similar to those used on the first and second stages of the Angara-A5 heavy carrier. The module is a complete structure consisting of oxidizer and fuel tanks and an engine compartment, has a diameter of 2.9 m and a length of 25.1 m. The URM-1 is equipped with a closed-circuit liquid rocket engine RD-191, created at NPO Energomash based on the RD-170 engine used on the first stages of Zenit and Energia launch vehicles and working on a kerosene-oxygen fuel pair.

In the configuration of the first stage of "Angara-1.2", the URM-1 additionally includes: a block of controllable gas nozzles operating on gas extracted after the RD-191 turbopump engine unit; aerodynamic rudders for roll control; an intermediate compartment for connection to the second stage.

=== Second Stage ===
In the first test launch, Angara-1.2PP used a non-standard rocket configuration, with the URM-2 unit of the Angara-A5 carrier with a diameter of 3.6 m as the second stage and without an aggregate module. The flight followed a suborbital trajectory with an inseparable payload layout.

In the standard configuration, the second stage of the Angara-1.2 differs from the URM-2 module, it carries a smaller fuel reserve and has the same diameter as the URM-1 — 2.9 m. Like the URM-2 module for Angara-A5, the second stage of Angara-1.2 runs on an oxygen-kerosene fuel pair and uses the RD-0124A closed cycle engine created at KBHA based on the RD-0124 engine used on the Soyuz-2 launch vehicles and having a record value of specific impulse for "kerolox" engines. The RD-0124A engine has a number of design differences from the RD-0124 and an extended operating time.

=== Aggregate module ===
To form the target orbit of the spacecraft on the Angara-1.2 a detachable aggregate module (upper stage) is used, operating on a high-boiling fuel pair dinitrogen tetroxide + UDMH or its western name equivalent MON+MMH. The aggregate module is equipped with low-thrust engines developed at NIIMash (Sverdlovsk region) — four 11D458 with a thrust of 40 kgf (390 N; 88 lbf) and fourteen orientation and stabilization engines 17D58E with a thrust of 1.3 kgf (13 N; 2.9 lbf) each.

=== Fairing ===
The payload fairing of the Angara-1.2 consists of two flaps, its shell has a three-layer cellular structure. An aggregate module, a payload adapter and a spacecraft are placed under the fairing. The fairing has a diameter of 2.9 meters and a total length of 9.2 m. A total volume of about 25 m^{3} can be used to place the payload under the fairing.

== Production ==
The Angara family rockets are manufactured by the Polyot production association, the Omsk branch of the Khrunichev, the parent company is engaged in the production of the aggregate module for Angara-1.2. Serial production of the Angara family of rockets was planned to begin in 2023, and in September 2022 it was announced that the start of serial production would be postponed to 2024.

== Launch sites ==
Launches of launch vehicles of the Angara family are carried out from Site 35 of the Plesetsk Cosmodrome. It is planned to create a launch complex at the Vostochny Cosmodrome.

== Launches ==
Video of the first test flight

Launches of the Angara 1.2 launch vehicle are carried out from the Site 35 at the Plesetsk Cosmodrome. The first flight of the Angara-1.2 launch vehicle in its standard configuration took place on April 29, 2022.

As of April 2026, in total, 7 rocket launches were carried out in the Angara-1.2 modification, all of them were successful.

Angara 1.2 launches, by year :

- Loss before launch
- Loss during flight
- Partial failure
- Success
- Planned

Date/time (UTC)	Configuration	Serial number	Launch pad	Outcome
Date/time (UTC)	Payload	Separation orbit	Operator	Function
Date/time (UTC)	Remarks			
29 April 2022; 19:55:22	Angara-1.2	71602	Plesetsk, Site 35/1	Success (of launcher)
29 April 2022; 19:55:22	Kosmos-2555 (EO MKA №2)	SSO	VKS	Reconnaissance
29 April 2022; 19:55:22	Maiden flight of Angara 1.2. No orbit-raising activities were detected from Kosmos-2555 following deployment, indicating a possible spacecraft failure. Re-entered May 18, 2022 after not attempting to raise its orbit.			
15 October 2022; 19:55:15	Angara-1.2	71603	Plesetsk, Site 35/1	Success
15 October 2022; 19:55:15	Kosmos-2560 (EO MKA №3)	SSO	VKS	Reconnaissance
15 October 2022; 19:55:15	Kosmos 2560 decayed from orbit 10 Dec 2022 01:54 UTC, also quite soon after launch. Some suspect this was due to spacecraft failure.			
17 September 2024; 07:01:00	Angara-1.2	71604	Plesetsk, Site 35/1	Success
17 September 2024; 07:01:00	Kosmos-2577 (OO MKA №1); Kosmos-2578 (OO MKA №2)	SSO	VKS	Reconnaissance
16 March 2025; 10:49:26	Angara-1.2	71605	Plesetsk, Site 35/1	Success
16 March 2025; 10:49:26	Kosmos-2585 (Strela-3M №19); Kosmos-2586 (Strela-3M №20); Kosmos-2587 (Strela-3M №21)	LEO	VKS	Military Communication
21 August 2025; 09:32	Angara-1.2	71606	Plesetsk, Site 35/1	Success
21 August 2025; 09:32	Kosmos-2591 (OO MKA №3); Kosmos-2592 (OO MKA №4); Kosmos-2593 (OO MKA №5); Kosmos-2594 (OO MKA №6)	SSO	VKS	Reconnaissance
25 November 2025; 13:42	Angara-1.2	71607	Plesetsk, Site 35/1	Success
25 November 2025; 13:42	Kosmos 2597 (Strela-3M №22); Kosmos 2598 (Strela-3M №23); Kosmos 2599 (Strela-3M №24)	LEO	VKS	Military communications
23 April 2026; 08:29	Angara-1.2	71608	Plesetsk, Site 35/1	Success
23 April 2026; 08:29	Unknown Kosmos satellite	LEO	VKS	Military communications
Future Launches

== See also ==
- Angara-1.2pp – Russian rocket mission
- Angara A5 – Russian heavy-lift launch vehicle
- Naro-1 – South Korea's first carrier rocket (2009–2013)
