= Angara A5 =

Russian heavy-lift launch vehicle

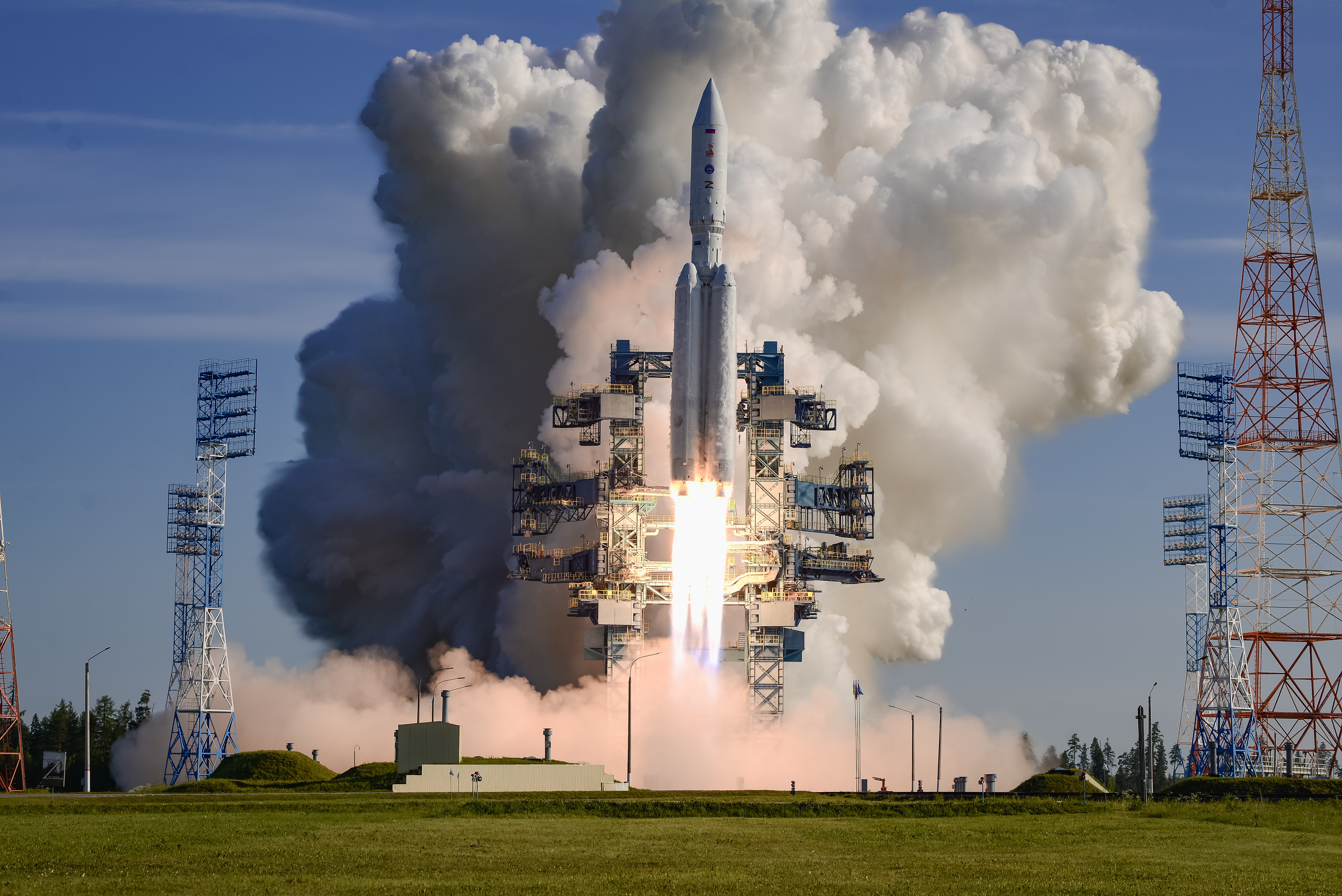
- First operational launch of Angara-A5 from Plesetsk cosmodrome
- Function: Heavy-lift launch vehicle
- Manufacturer: Khrunichev · KBKhA
- Country of origin: Russia
- Cost per launch: US$100 million (2021)

Size
- Height: 55.4 m (182 ft)
- Width: 8.86 m (29.1 ft)
- Mass: 171,500–790,000 kg (378,100–1,741,700 lb)
- Stages: 2-3

Capacity

Payload to LEO (Plesetsk)
- Mass: 24,500 kg (54,000 lb)

Payload to GTO (Plesetsk)
- Mass: 5,400 kg (11,900 lb) - 7,500 kg (16,500 lb)

Associated rockets
- Family: Angara
- Comparable: Naro-1

Launch history
- Status: Active
- Launch sites: Plesetsk, Site 35; Vostochny, Site 1A
- Total launches: 5
- Success(es): 4
- Partial failure: 1
- First flight: 23 December 2014
- Last flight: 19 June 2025 (most recent)

Boosters – URM-1
- No. boosters: 4
- Powered by: 1 × RD-191
- Maximum thrust: 1,920 kN (430,000 lb_{f})
- Total thrust: 7,680 kN (1,730,000 lb_{f})
- Specific impulse: 310.7 s (3.047 km/s)
- Burn time: 214 seconds
- Propellant: LOX / RP-1

First stage – URM-1
- Powered by: 1 × RD-191
- Maximum thrust: 1,920 kN (430,000 lb_{f})
- Specific impulse: 310.7 s (3.047 km/s)
- Burn time: 325 seconds
- Propellant: LOX / RP-1

Second stage – URM-2
- Powered by: 1 × RD-0124A
- Maximum thrust: 294.3 kN (66,200 lb_{f})
- Specific impulse: 359 s (3.52 km/s)
- Burn time: 424 seconds
- Propellant: LOX / RP-1

Third stage – Briz-M (optional)
- Powered by: 1 × S5.98M
- Maximum thrust: 19.6 kN (4,400 lb_{f})
- Specific impulse: 326 s (3.20 km/s)
- Burn time: 3,000 seconds
- Propellant: N_{2}O_{4} / UDMH

Third stage – Blok DM-03 (optional)
- Powered by: 1 × RD-58MF
- Maximum thrust: 19.6 kN (4,400 lb_{f})
- Specific impulse: 326 s (3.20 km/s)
- Burn time: 3,000 seconds
- Propellant: LOX / RP-1

Third stage – KVTK (optional, under development)
- Powered by: 1 × RD-0146D
- Maximum thrust: 68.6 kN (15,400 lb_{f})
- Specific impulse: 463 s (4.54 km/s)
- Burn time: 1,350 seconds
- Propellant: LOX / LH_{2}

Angara A5 (Russian: Ангара-А5), is a Russian expendable heavy lift launch vehicle which consists of one URM-1 core and four URM-1 boosters, a 3.6-metre (12 ft) URM-2 second stage, and an upper stage, either the Briz-M, Blok DM-03 or the KVTK. Weighing 773 tonnes (1,704,000 lb) at lift-off, Angara A5 has a payload capacity of 24.5 tonnes (54,000 lb) to a 200 km (120 mi) x 60° orbit. Angara A5 is able to deliver 5.4 tonnes (12,000 lb) to GTO with Briz-M, or 7.5 tonnes (17,000 lb) to the same orbit with KVTK. Adding a kick stage increases the height of the rocket.

In the Angara A5, the four URM-1s used as boosters operate at full thrust for approximately 214 seconds, then separate. The URM-1 forming the vehicle's core is operated at full thrust for lift off, then throttled down to 30% to conserve propellant. The core is throttled back up after the boosters have separated and continues burning for another 110 seconds.

The first Angara A5 test flight was launched on 23 December 2014. The second test flight was launched on 14 December 2020 from Plesetsk.

Some official models show the Angara carrying an Orel crew capsule spacecraft with an abort tower.

== Launch statistics ==
=== Launch outcomes ===
- Loss before launch
- Loss during flight
- Partial failure
- Success
- Planned

== Launches ==
Date/time (UTC)	Configuration	Serial number	Launch pad	Outcome
Date/time (UTC)	Payload	Separation orbit	Operator	Function
Date/time (UTC)	Remarks			
23 December 2014; 05:57	Angara A5 / Briz-M	71751	Plesetsk, Site 35	Success
23 December 2014; 05:57	IPM №1 (MGM №1)	LEO	RVSN RF	Mass simulator 2,000 kg (4,400 lb)
23 December 2014; 05:57	Maiden flight of Angara A5, mass simulator intentionally not separated from Briz-M upper stage Orbital test flight No.1.			
14 December 2020; 05:50	Angara A5 / Briz-M	71752	Plesetsk, Site 35/1	Success
14 December 2020; 05:50	IPM №2 (MGM №2)	GSO	RVSN RF	Mass simulator 2,400 kg (5,300 lb)
14 December 2020; 05:50	Second orbital test flight. Orbital test flight No.2.			
27 December 2021; 19:00	Angara A5 / Persei	71753	Plesetsk, Site 35/1	Partial Failure
27 December 2021; 19:00	IPN №1 (MGM №3)	Geocentric supersynchronous	RVSN RF	Mass simulator 5,400 kg (11,900 lb)
27 December 2021; 19:00	First flight test of Blok DM-03 upper stage variant for Angara. Upper stage failed to restart for 2nd burn, leaving upper stage and payload in low Earth orbit. They decayed from orbit after about two weeks. Orbital test flight No.3.			
11 April 2024; 09:00	Angara A5 / Orion	72901	Vostochny, Site 1A	Success
11 April 2024; 09:00	GMM-KA; Gagarinets; Dummy Cubesat	GEO; LEO	Roscosmos	Mass simulator
11 April 2024; 09:00	First flight test of the Angara A5 from Vostochny Cosmodrome (Vostochny Angara Test Flight). Orbital test flight No.4.			
19 June 2025; 03:00	Angara A5 / Briz-M	71754	Plesetsk, Site 35/1	Success
19 June 2025; 03:00	Kosmos 2589 (14F166A №1); Kosmos 2590 (14F166A Subsat 1)	GEO	RVSN RF	Classified
19 June 2025; 03:00	First operational launch of Angara A5. A new long fairing is used in this launch.			
Future Launches
2028	Angara A5		Vostochny, Site 1A	TBD
2028	Orel	LEO	Roscosmos	Space capsule
2028	Uncrewed test launch of Orel spacecraft.			
2028	Angara A5P		Vostochny, Site 1A	TBD
2028	Orel	LEO	Roscosmos	Space capsule
2028	Uncrewed test launch of Orel to the International Space Station. First flight of the Angara A5P, a crew-rated variant of the Angara A5.			
2028	Angara A5P		Vostochny, Site 1A	TBD
2028	Orel	LEO	Roscosmos	Space capsule
2028	Crewed test launch of Orel to the International Space Station.			
2029	Angara A5		Vostochny, Site 1A	TBD
2029	Luna 27A	Selenocentric	Roscosmos	Lunar lander
2029	Third mission of Luna-Glob Programme.			
NET 2029	Angara A5P		Vostochny, Site 1A	TBD
NET 2029	Orel	LEO	Roscosmos	Space capsule
NET 2029	Crewed Orel flight test.			
2030	Angara A5		Vostochny, Site 1A	TBD
2030	Luna 27B	Selenocentric	Roscosmos	Lunar lander
2030	Fourth mission of Luna-Glob Programme.			
NET 2030	Angara A5P		Vostochny, Site 1A	TBD
NET 2030	Orel	LEO	Roscosmos	Space capsule
NET 2030	Crewed Orel flight test.			
2031	Angara A5M / DM-03		Vostochny, Site 1A	TBD
2031	Spektr-UV	IGSO	Roscosmos	Ultraviolet space telescope
2032	Angara A5		Vostochny, Site 1A	TBD
2032	Luna 29	Selenocentric	Roscosmos	Lunar orbiter
2032	Fifth mission of Luna-Glob Programme.			
2034	Angara A5 / DM-03		Vostochny, Site 1A	TBD
2034	Luna 28	Selenocentric	Roscosmos	Lunar lander / Lunar sample return
2034	Lunar sample-return mission.			
2035	Angara A5V		Vostochny, Site 1A	TBD
2035	Spektr-M	Sun-Earth L2 Lagrange Point	Roscosmos	Millimeter wavelength space telescope

== See also ==
- Angara-1.2pp
- Angara 1.2
