= Soyuz-5 (rocket) =

Russian heavy-lift rocket

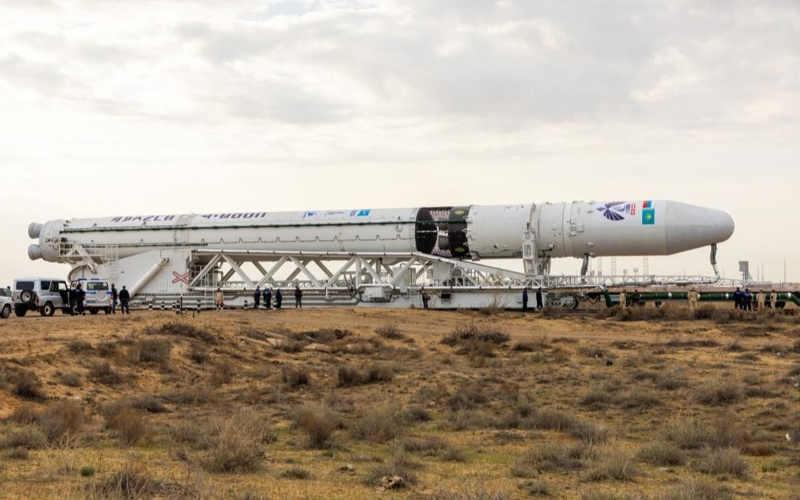
- First Irtysh rocket at Baikonur Site 45/1 before launch
- Function: Medium-lift launch vehicle
- Manufacturer: RKTs Progress · Energia
- Country of origin: Russia
- Project cost: 61.2 billion ₽

Size
- Height: Uncrewed: 61.9 m (203 ft 1 in); Crewed: 65.9 m (216 ft 2 in)
- Diameter: 4.1 m (13 ft 5 in)
- Mass: 530,000 kg (1,170,000 lb)
- Stages: Three

Capacity

Payload to LEO
- Mass: Uncrewed: 18,000 kg (40,000 lb); Crewed: 15,500 kg (34,200 lb)

Payload to GTO
- Mass: 5,000 kg (11,000 lb)

Associated rockets
- Comparable: Ariane 6; Falcon 9; H3; Long March 5; Proton-M; Vulcan Centaur

Launch history
- Status: Active
- Launch sites: Baikonur, Site 45/1
- Total launches: 1
- Success(es): 1
- First flight: 30 April 2026, 18:00 UTC

First stage
- Height: 37.14 m (121 ft 10 in)
- Diameter: 4.1 m (13 ft 5 in)
- Empty mass: 27,700 kg (61,100 lb)
- Propellant mass: 363,000 kg (800,000 lb)
- Powered by: 1 × RD-171MV
- Maximum thrust: 7,257 kN (1,631,000 lb_{f})
- Specific impulse: 309 s (3.03 km/s)
- Burn time: 179 seconds
- Propellant: LOX / RP-1

Second stage
- Height: 7.77 m (25 ft 6 in)
- Diameter: 4.1 m (13 ft 5 in)
- Empty mass: 5,900 kg (13,000 lb)
- Propellant mass: 59,000 kg (130,000 lb)
- Powered by: 1 x RD-0124MS
- Maximum thrust: 588.6 kN (132,300 lb_{f})
- Specific impulse: 359 s (3.52 km/s)
- Burn time: 393 seconds
- Propellant: LOX / RP-1

Third stage (optional) – Fregat-SBU
- Height: 1.945 m (6 ft 4.6 in)
- Diameter: 3.8 m (12 ft 6 in)
- Powered by: 1 × S5.92
- Maximum thrust: 13.93–19.85 kN (3,130–4,460 lb_{f})
- Specific impulse: 320–333.2 s (3.14–3.27 km/s)
- Propellant: N_{2}O_{4} / UDMH

Third stage – Blok DM-SLB (optional)
- Height: 6.28 m (20 ft 7 in)
- Diameter: 3.7 m (12 ft 2 in)
- Empty mass: 2,140 kg (4,720 lb)
- Gross mass: 17,360 kg (38,270 lb)
- Propellant mass: 18,700 kg (41,200 lb)
- Powered by: 1 × RD-58MF
- Maximum thrust: 49.03 kN (11,020 lb_{f})
- Specific impulse: 353 s (3.46 km/s)
- Propellant: LOX / RP-1

Soyuz-5 (Russian: Союз-5), (Note: Also named Irtysh (Russian: Иртыш), formerly codenamed Fenix (Russian: Феникс, lit. 'phoenix') in Russian and Sunkar (Kazakh: Сұңқар, lit. 'falcon') in Kazakh) is a Russian medium-lift launch vehicle developed by RKTs Progress. Designed to replace the Zenit, it will also serve as the base of the Yenisei, a super heavy-lift launch vehicle. Soyuz-5 first launched in April 2026, and flies from Site 45, the former Zenit launch site, at the Baikonur Cosmodrome under a partnership with the government of Kazakhstan.

The rocket uses a Kerolox propellant mixture. The first stage is powered by the four-chambered RD-171MV, the most powerful liquid fuel engine in the world, based on the Soviet Union's RD-170 originally constructed for the Energia super heavy-lifter. The RD-0124MS powers the second stage, and rocket has the option to use the Blok DM-03 third stage, also used on the Angara A5.

Development of Soyuz‑5 was driven by the end of launches of the Ukrainian-built Zenit following the start of the Russo-Ukrainian war in 2014.

== Project organization ==
The current proposal is led by RKTs Progress, with support from Khrunichev and Makeyev, additionally, Energia would handle the launch site, and supply the optional Blok DM-03 third stage, while Roscosmos would finance the development through the Project Feniks under the 2016–2025 Russian space master plan. KazCosmos would also be a partner since the initial launch pad would be at Baikonur Cosmodrome Site 45 in Kazakhstan, within the framework of the Baiterek bi-national joint venture, and International Launch Services (ILS) would commercialize its services for the international market.

The initial application of the launch vehicle would be to cover the under 5 tonnes (11,000 lb) to GTO commercial launch segment. With the loss of the Zenit-3SLB due to Russian conflicts with Ukraine, both the decision not to develop Angara A3 and launch Angara A5 from Vostochny, the Baiterek project was without a launch vehicle. The 2016 announcement of the Proton Medium and Light meant that ILS could enter the medium GTO launch market, but since the Kazakhstani government desired to deprecate the use of highly toxic hypergolic propellants used by Proton, they would need a replacement.

For this commercial application, RKTs Progress proposed the Soyuz-5 in early 2016. It would start with this commercial application with the prospect of also enabling a super heavy launcher with an 80 tonnes (180,000 lb) payload capability to low Earth orbit. The Kazakhstani side agreed on the general terms, but the investment share was left to decide. As part of the 2016 arrangements, the Kazakhstani government would get ownership of one of the Proton launch pads, and participate in the operations of Proton-Medium and Proton-Light. Then, they would get to participate in the Irtysh launchers since its expected debut in 2024. As of August 2023 further delays in the construction of the launch site and in the development of the rocket pushed the date of the maiden flight to December 2025.

Four test launches are planned before the development is considered complete.

Development of the Irtysh is expected to face delays, as the necessary modification of the launch pad at Site 45 for launching the Irtysh was delayed, starting only in late 2021. International sanctions following the Russian Invasion of Ukraine further slowed operations. In July 2022, Dmitry Rogozin, then CEO of Roscosmos, admitted that construction would be postponed by six months to one year.

In March 2023, it became public that the Baiterek Kazakhstani-Russian joint venture in charge of the site had seized the facility after filing a claim of about 2 billion rubles ([equivalent to US$30.3 million) to TsENKI, a Roscosmos subsidiary in charge of handling ground-based infrastructure, as Roscosmos had failed its obligation to conduct an environmental impact assessment of Site 45, causing additional delays.

== Vehicle ==
Soyuz-5, as proposed in 2016, leverages existing propulsion and tooling, while enabling a platform that would replace the lost capabilities of the Zenit family, replace the Proton Light/Medium, and could serve as the boosters of a new super heavy rocket. It will initially be a two-stage rocket, but could be enhanced with an optional Blok DM-03 for geostationary missions. It would be compatible with most of the Zenit's ground infrastructure, and even use the Site 45 at Baikonur.

Its tanks would be 4.1 m (13 ft) in diameter, which would enable the re use of Proton tooling. Since they would be wider than Zenit, (3.9 m (13 ft)) it would enable a higher propellant load for the same height. While this diameter enables a heavier rocket and is already compatible with train transport to Baikonur, it would prevent that method of transport for Vostochny Cosmodrome. It would use the relatively environmental friendly RP-1/LOX propellant, which would be an improvement over the highly toxic hypergolics of Proton. This has been a requirement from the Kazakh government for new projects.

The first stage will be powered by an RD-171MV, very similar to the RD-171M used in Zenit 2 and 3. With a height of 37.14 m (121.9 ft) it would be higher than Zenit's first stage (32.94 m (108.1 ft)) and wider, and thus it could carry 363 t (400 tons) of propellant versus 290 t (320 tons). Its base would still feature a 3.68 m (12.1 ft) aft section for compatibility with Zenit's pad and support infrastructure.

Its second stage measures 7.77 m (25.5 ft) by 4.1 m (13 ft) in diameter, with a dry mass of 5.9 t (6.5 tons) and an RG-1/LOX load of 59 t (65 tons). It is powered by a RD-0124MS engine.

With a gross mass of 484 t (534 tons) against Zenit 430 t (470 tons), and the improved efficiency of its second stage, it can launch 16 t (18 tons) to a 200 km circular orbit with an inclination of 51.6° to the Equator from Baikonur. This is a significant improvement over Zenit, which could only place roughly 12 t (13 tons) to the same orbit.

For geostationary launch missions, it can optionally be equipped with a Blok DM-03 third stage. Since it would use the same propellant and is already used on the Zenit-3SL and Angara A5, it would be a low risk option. The expected performance of 4.5 t (5.0 tons) to GTO and 2.3 t (2.5 tons) to GSO, it would improve over Zenit-3SLB 3.6 t (4.0 tons) and 1.59 t (1.75 tons).

== Soyuz-5 super-heavy lift launch vehicle (Yenisei) ==
The Irtysh first stage will be used as the boosters (and even core) of the super-heavy lift launch vehicle Yenisei capable of launching 73 tonnes (161,000 lb) to low Earth orbit from Baikonur or Vostochny. Improving the performance to 120 tonnes (260,000 lb) and even 160 tonnes (350,000 lb) was considered possible with this architecture. While the current 2016-2025 plan for deep space exploration calls for the use of the heavy Angara A5V, it would just enable 36 tonnes (79,000 lb), requiring up to four launches for a single Moon mission, and would also require the use of expensive hydrogen as fuel. The Yenisei would simplify the mission while using readily available Irtysh first stages.

== Launches ==
Launch	Launch Configuration	Date (UTC)	Launch site	Payload	Orbit	Outcome	Remarks
1	Soyuz-5	30 April 2026, 18:00	Baikonur, Site 45/1	Mass simulator	Suborbital	Success	First test flight of Soyuz 5
2	Soyuz-5/Fregat-SBU	Second half of 2027	Baikonur, Site 45/1	TBA	Low Earth	Planned	Second test flight of Soyuz 5
3	Soyuz-5/Blok DM-SLB	2028	Baikonur, Site 45/1	TBA	Low Earth	Planned	Third test flight of Soyuz 5

== See also ==
- Proton-M – Russian heavy lift launcher which uses hypergolic fuel
- Zenit rocket family – Soviet (now Ukrainian) rocket
- Soyuz-7 rocket family – Proposed reusable Russian rocket design
- Angara – Russian family of space launch vehicles
- Rus-M – Canceled Russian proposal for a crewed launch vehicle
