= Angara (rocket family) =

Russian family of space launch vehicles

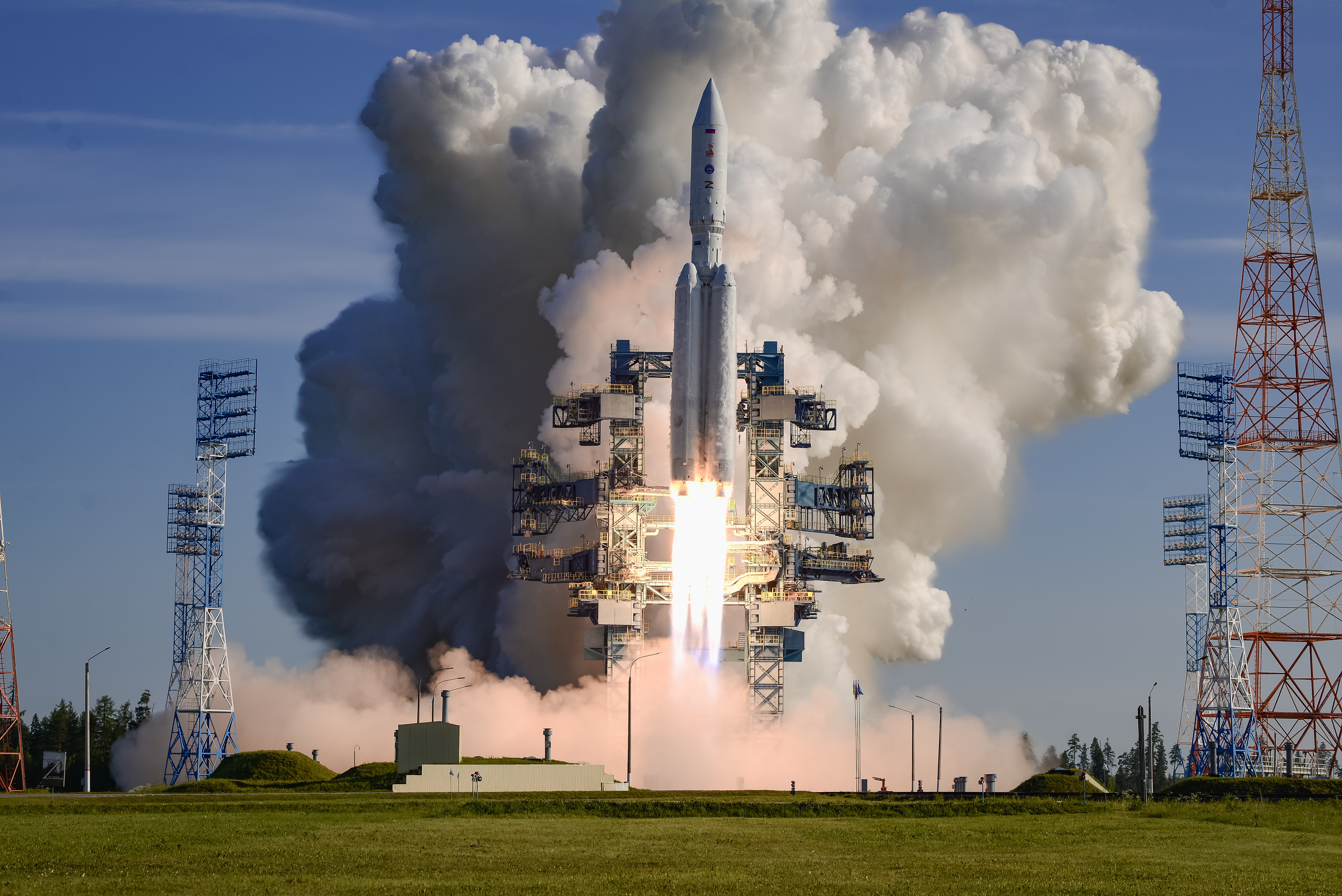
- First operational launch of Angara-A5 rocket
- Function: Launch vehicle
- Manufacturer: Khrunichev · KBKhA
- Country of origin: Russia
- Cost per launch: A5: US$100 million (2021)

Size
- Height: 42.7–64 m (140–210 ft)
- Width: A1.2: 2.9 m (9 ft 6 in); A5: 8.86 m (29.1 ft)
- Mass: 171,500–790,000 kg (378,100–1,741,700 lb)
- Stages: 2-3

Capacity

Payload to LEO (Plesetsk)
- Mass: 3,800–24,500 kg (8,400–54,000 lb)

Payload to GTO (Plesetsk)
- Mass: 5,400–7,500 kg (11,900–16,500 lb)

Associated rockets
- Derivative work: A1.2pp; A1.2; A5
- Comparable: Naro-1 used a modified URM-1 first stage

Launch history
- Status: Active
- Launch sites: Plesetsk, Site 35/1; Vostochny, Site 1A
- Total launches: 13 (A1.2pp: 1, A1.2: 7, A5: 5)
- Success(es): 12 (A1.2pp: 1, A1.2: 7, A5: 4)
- Partial failure: 1 (A5: 1)
- First flight: A1.2pp: 9 July 2014; A1.2: 29 April 2022; A5: 23 December 2014
- Last flight: A1.2: 23 April 2026 (most recent); A5: 19 June 2025 (most recent)

Boosters (A5) – URM-1
- No. boosters: 4
- Powered by: 1 × RD-191
- Maximum thrust: 1,920 kN (430,000 lb_{f})
- Specific impulse: 310.7 s (3.047 km/s)
- Burn time: 214 seconds
- Propellant: LOX / RP-1

First stage – URM-1
- Powered by: 1 × RD-191
- Maximum thrust: 1,920 kN (430,000 lb_{f})
- Specific impulse: 310.7 s (3.047 km/s)
- Burn time: Angara 1.2: 214 seconds Angara A5: 325 seconds
- Propellant: LOX / RP-1

Second stage – URM-2
- Powered by: 1 × RD-0124A
- Maximum thrust: 294.3 kN (66,200 lb_{f})
- Specific impulse: 359 s (3.52 km/s)
- Burn time: 424 seconds
- Propellant: LOX / RP-1

Third stage (A5) – Briz-M (optional)
- Powered by: 1 × S5.98M
- Maximum thrust: 19.6 kN (4,400 lb_{f})
- Specific impulse: 326 s (3.20 km/s)
- Burn time: 3,000 seconds
- Propellant: N_{2}O_{4} / UDMH

Third stage (A5) – Blok DM-03 (optional)
- Powered by: 1 × RD-58MF
- Maximum thrust: 19.6 kN (4,400 lb_{f})
- Specific impulse: 326 s (3.20 km/s)
- Burn time: 3,000 seconds
- Propellant: LOX / RP-1

Third stage (A5) – KVTK (optional, under development)
- Powered by: 1 × RD-0146D
- Maximum thrust: 68.6 kN (15,400 lb_{f})
- Specific impulse: 463 s (4.54 km/s)
- Burn time: 1,350 seconds
- Propellant: LOX / LH_{2}

The Angara (Russian: Ангара) is a family of launch vehicles being developed by the Moscow-based Khrunichev State Research and Production Space Center. The launch vehicles are to put between 3,800 kg (8,400 lb) and 24,500 kg (54,000 lb) into low Earth orbit and are intended, along with Soyuz-2 variants, to replace several existing launch vehicles.

== History ==
After the dissolution of the Soviet Union, some formerly Soviet launch vehicles required components from companies now located in Ukraine, such as Yuzhnoye Design Bureau, which produced Zenit-2, and Yuzhmash, which produced Dnepr and Tsyklon. Additionally, the Soviet Union's main spaceport, Baikonur Cosmodrome, was located in Kazakhstan, and Russia encountered difficulties negotiating for its use. This led to the decision in 1992 to develop a new entirely Russian launch vehicle, named Angara, to replace the launch vehicles now built outside of the country, and ensure Russian access to space without Baikonur. It was decided that this vehicle should ideally use the partially completed Zenit-2 launch pad at the Russian Plesetsk Cosmodrome, and be able to launch military satellites into geosynchronous orbit, which Proton could not due to lack of a launch pad at Plesetsk Cosmodrome. Several companies submitted bids for the new launch vehicle, and in 1994 Khrunichev, the developer of Proton, was selected as the winner. The commercial success of Proton over the next two decades would be an advantage to Khrunichev, as the Angara project immediately ran into funding difficulties from the cash-strapped Russian government.

Khrunichev's initial design called for the use of a modified RD-170 for first stage propulsion and a liquid hydrogen powered second stage. By 1997, the hydrogen-powered second stage had been abandoned in favor of kerosene, and the RD-170 was replaced with a modular design which would be powered by the new RD-191, a one-chamber engine derived from the four-chamber RD-170. In late 1997, Khrunichev was given approval from the Russian government to proceed with their new design, which would both be able to replace the ICBM-based Dnepr, Tsyklon, and Rokot with its smaller variants, as well as be able to launch satellites into geostationary orbit from Plesetsk with the Proton-class Angara A5.

By 2004, the design of Angara had taken shape and the project proceeded with development of the launchers. In 2008, NPO Energomash, the builder of the RD-191, reported that the engine had completed development and burn tests and was ready for manufacturing and delivery, and in January 2009 the first completed Angara first stage was delivered to Khrunichev. The next year Vladimir Nesterov, Director-General of Khrunichev, announced that the first flight test of Angara would be scheduled for 2013, and in 2013 the first prototype Angara launch vehicle arrived in Plesetsk.

In 2014, 22 years after Angara's original conception, the first launch took place on 9 July 2014, an Angara 1.2PP suborbital test flight from the northern Plesetsk Cosmodrome. On 23 December 2014, Angara A5's first test flight was performed, launching it into geosynchronous orbit. In June 2020, it was reported that the first Angara Launching Pad was completed and would be transported to Vostochny Cosmodrome.

On 14 December 2020, 6 years after the first test flight, Angara-A5's second test flight took place from Plesetsk. According to Roscosmos chief Dmitriy Rogozin speaking about future plans after the launch in December 2020, two more Angara launches were coming in 2021: an Angara-1.2 and an Angara-A5 with a new booster, Persei. Only the launch of Angara-A5 with Persei upper stage ended up happening in 2021. The maiden flight of Angara 1.2 happened on 29 April 2022.

== Vehicle description ==
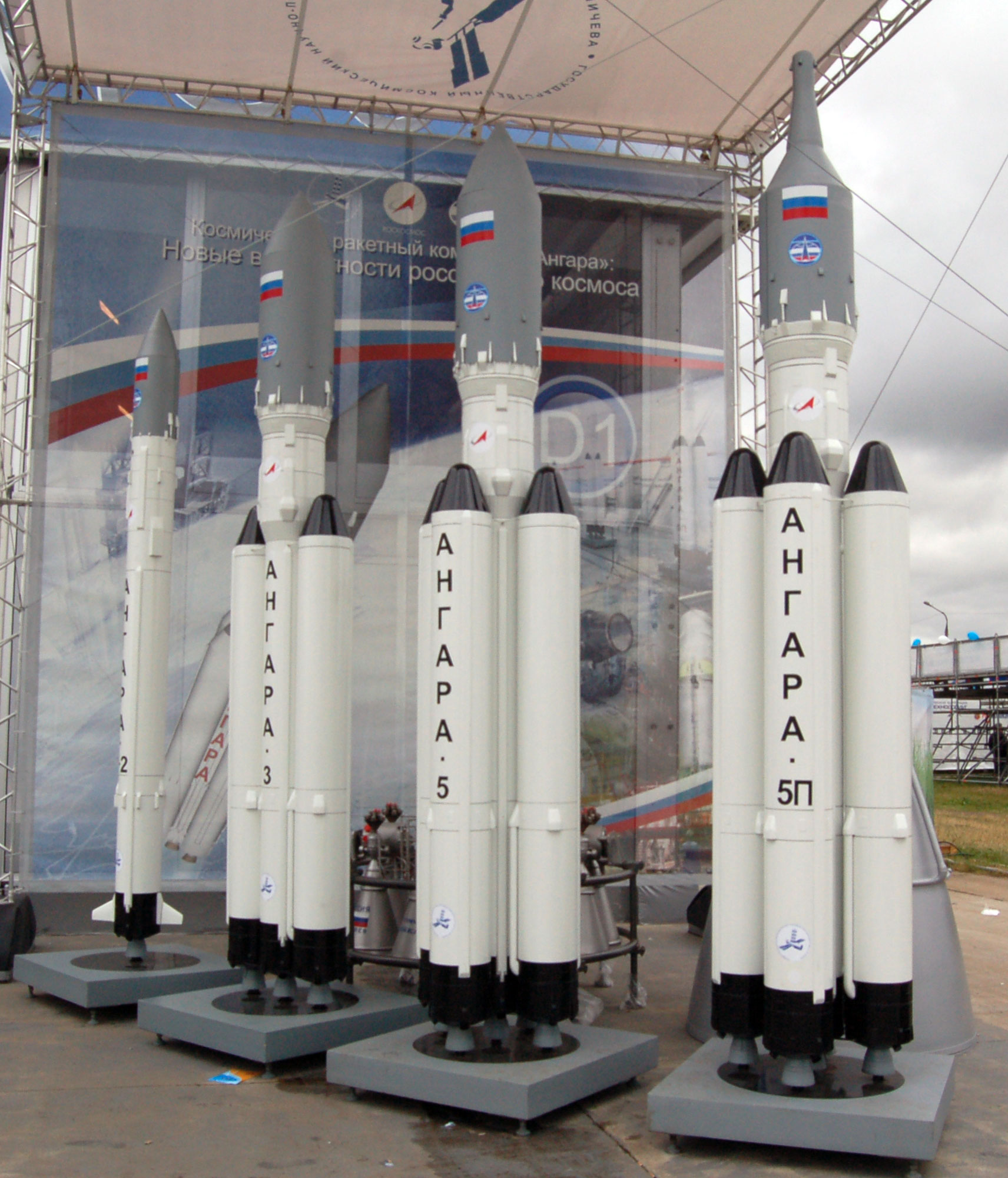
Angara mock-ups at the MAKS 2009 airshow near Moscow

=== URM-1: first stage and boosters ===
The Universal Rocket Module (URM-1) forms the core of every Angara vehicle. In the Angara A5, four additional URM-1s act as boosters. Each URM-1 is powered by a single NPO Energomash RD-191 burning liquid oxygen and RP-1 (kerosene).

The RD-191 is a single-chamber engine derived from the four-chamber RD-170, originally developed for the boosters powering the Energia launch vehicle. Zenit's four-chamber RD-171 and the dual-chamber RD-180 powering ULA's Atlas V are also derivatives of the RD-170, as is the RD-193 proposed as a replacement for the 1970s-era NK-33 powering the first stage of the Soyuz 2.1v. The RD-191 is capable of throttling down to at least 30%, allowing core URM-1 stages to conserve propellant until booster URM-1 separation.

The URM-1 consists of a liquid oxygen tank at the top, followed by an intertank structure containing flight control and telemetry equipment, with the kerosene tank below that. At the base of the module is a propulsion bay containing engine gimballing equipment for vehicle pitch and yaw and thrusters for roll control.

=== URM-2: second stage ===
The second stage of the Angara, designated URM-2, uses one KBKhA RD-0124A engine also burning liquid oxygen and kerosene. The RD-0124A is nearly identical to the RD-0124 currently powering the second stage of Soyuz-2, designated Block I. The URM-2 has a diameter of 3.6 m (12 ft) for the Angara A5 and other proposed variants. The Angara 1.2 will fly a smaller RD-0124A-powered second stage, which may be 2.66 m (8 ft 9 in) to maintain commonality with Block I or widened to 2.9 m (9 ft 6 in) to maintain a consistent diameter with URM-1.

=== Upper stages (after 2nd) ===
Angara 1.2 will not use an upper stage, nor will Angara A5 when delivering payloads to low orbits. For higher energy orbits such as GTO, Angara A5 will use the Briz-M upper stage (currently used for the Proton-M rocket), powered by one S5.98M burning N_{2}O_{4} and UDMH, or eventually a new cryogenic upper stage, the KVTK. This stage will use the LH2/LOX powered RD-0146D and allow Angara A5 to bring up to two tonnes more mass to GTO. The Blok D is being considered as an upper stage when launched from Vostochny since it will avoid the toxic propellant of the Briz-M.

== Variants ==
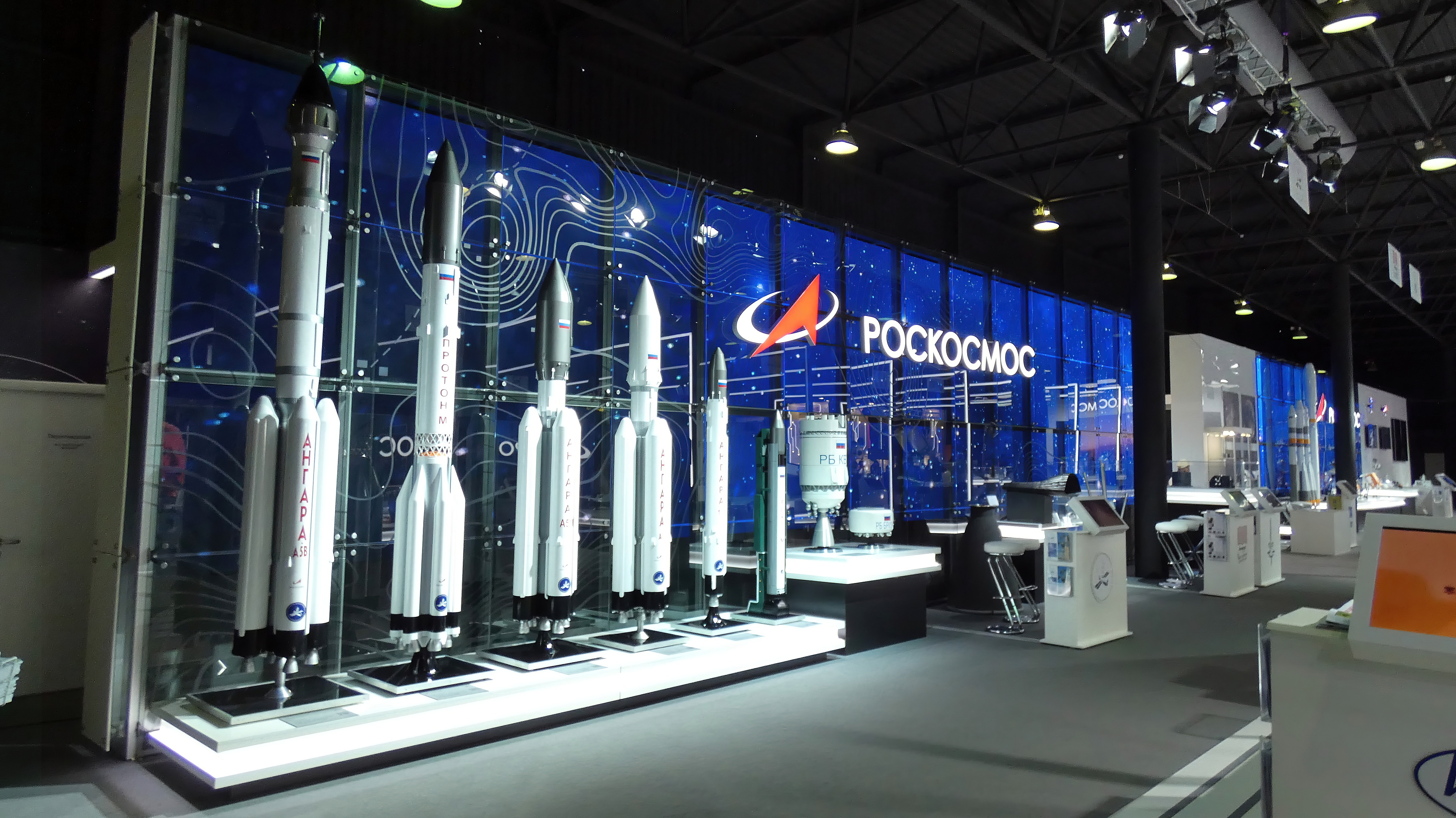
From the left: Angara A5V, Proton M, Angara A5, Angara A5 and Angara 1.2 on MAKS 2021

=== Angara 1.2 ===
The smallest Angara is the Angara 1.2, which consists of one URM-1 core and a modified Block I second stage. It has a lift-off mass of 171 tonnes and can deliver 3.8 tonnes of payload to a 200 km (120 mi) × 60° orbit. The successful maiden launch of Angara 1.2 took place 29 April 2022.

==== Angara 1.2pp ====
A modified Angara 1.2, called Angara 1.2PP (Angara-1.2 pervyy polyot, meaning Angara-1.2 first flight), made Angara's inaugural suborbital flight on 9 July 2014. This flight lasted 22 minutes and carried a mass simulator weighing 1,430 kg (3,150 lb). Angara 1.2PP weighed 171,000 kg (377,000 lb) and consisted of a URM-1 core stage and a partially fueled 3.6 m (12 ft)-diameter URM-2, allowing each of the major components of Angara A5 to be flight tested before that version's first orbital launch, conducted on 23 December 2014.

=== Angara A5 ===
The second Angara developed was the heavy lift launch vehicle, the Angara A5, which consists of one URM-1 core and four URM-1 boosters, a 3.6 m (12 ft) URM-2 second stage, and an upper stage, either the Briz-M or the KVTK. Weighing 773 tonnes at lift-off, Angara A5 has a payload capacity of 24.5 tonnes to a 200 km (120 mi) × 60° orbit. Angara A5 is able to deliver 5.4 tonnes to GTO with Briz-M, or 7.5 tonnes to the same orbit with KVTK.

In the Angara A5, the four URM-1s used as boosters operate at full thrust for approximately 214 seconds, then separate. The URM-1 forming the vehicle's core is operated at full thrust for lift off, then throttled down to 30% to conserve propellant. The core is throttled back up after the boosters have separated and continues burning for another 110 seconds.

The first Angara A5 test flight was launched on 23 December 2014. The second test flight was launched on 14 December 2020 from Plesetsk. A third test flight was launched on 27 December 2021, also from Plesetsk. However, the test of Persei upper stage failed and the payload did not make it from LEO to GEO.

=== Proposed versions ===
==== Angara 1.1 ====
Initial plans called for an even smaller Angara 1.1 using a Briz-KM as a second stage, with a payload capacity of 2 tonnes. This version was cancelled as it fell into the same payload class as the Soyuz 2.1v, which made its debut flight in 2013.

==== Angara A3 ====
The Angara A3 would consist of one URM-1 core, two URM-1 boosters, the 3.6m URM-2, and an optional Briz-M or hydrogen powered upper stage for high energy orbits. The hydrogen powered stage for this vehicle, called RCAF would be smaller than the Angara A5's KVTK. This vehicle has no current plans for use (14.6 tonnes to 200 km × 60°, 2.4 tonnes to GTO with Briz-M or 3.6 tonnes with a hydrogen upper stage), but could be developed as a replacement for Zenit.

==== Angara A5P ====
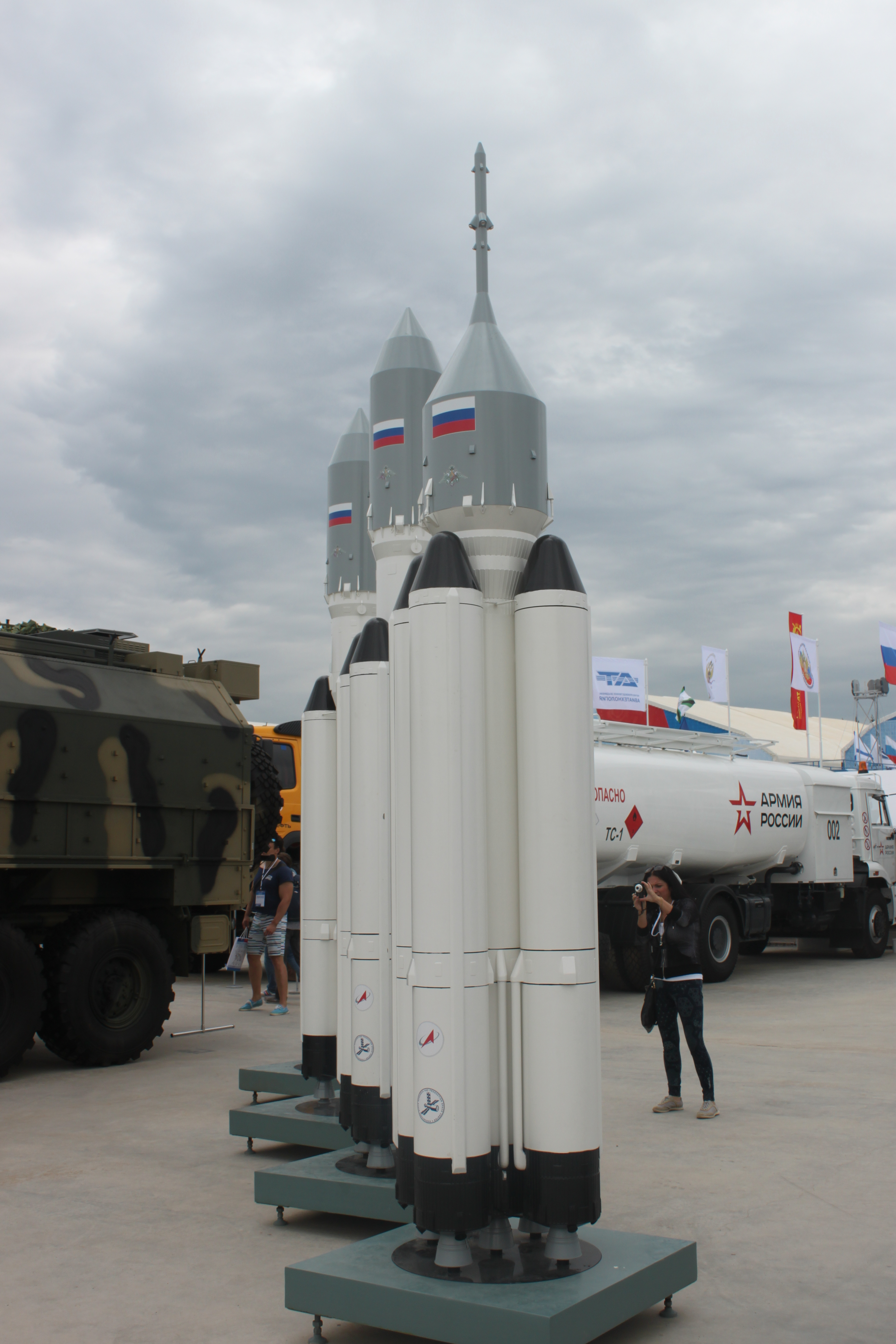
A5P

Khrunichev has proposed an Angara A5 capable of launching a new crewed spacecraft weighing up to 18 tonnes: the Angara 5P. This version would have 4 URM-1s as boosters surrounding a sustainer core URM-1 but lack a second stage, relying on the spacecraft to complete orbital insertion from a slightly suborbital trajectory, much like the Buran or Space Shuttle. This has the advantage of allowing all engines to be lit and checked out while on the ground, eliminating the possibility of an engine failing to start after staging. The RD-191 engines may also be operated at reduced thrust to improve safety.

==== Angara A5V ====
Khrunichev has proposed an upgraded Angara A5 variant featuring a new large hydrogen-based upper stage (URM-2V) to replace the existing URM-2, along with upgraded engine thrust on the URM-1 stages. The thrust upgrade on the URM-1 boosters would be approximately 10% higher during the first 40 seconds of flight, ensuring an adequate thrust-to-weight ratio even with the heavier URM-2V. Cross-feed, as well as more powerful RD-195 engines for the URM-1 stages, is also being considered. The payload capacity of the A5V is expected to be around 35–40 tonnes to LEO, depending on the final configuration.

==== Angara A7 ====
Proposals exist for a heavier Angara A7, weighing 1133 tonnes and capable of putting 35 tonnes into a 200 km (120 mi) × 60° orbit, or delivering 12.5 tonnes to GTO with an enlarged KVTK-A7 as a second stage in place of the URM-2. There are no current plans to develop this vehicle as it would require a larger core URM-1 to carry more propellant and would have to await the development of the hydrogen powered engine for KVTK. The Angara A7 would also require a different launch pad.

==== Angara-100 ====
The Angara-100 was a 2005 proposal by Khrunichev to build a heavy-lift launch vehicle for NASA's Vision for Space Exploration. The rocket would consist of four RD-170-powered boosters, an RD-180-powered core stage, and a cryogenic upper stage using a modified Energia RD-0120 engine, the RD-0122. Its payload capacity to LEO would be in excess of 100 tons.

==== Baikal ====
Together with NPO Molniya, Khrunichev has also proposed a reusable URM-1 booster named Baikal. The URM-1 would be fitted with a wing, an empennage, a landing gear, a return flight engine and attitude control thrusters, to enable the rocket booster to return to an airfield after completing its mission.

== Specifications ==
Version	Angara 1.1	Angara 1.2	Angara A3	Angara A5	Angara A5P	Angara A5V	Angara A7	Angara A7.2B
Status	Cancelled	Active	Planned	Active	Planned	Planned	Planned	Planned
Boosters	—N/a	—N/a	2 × URM-1	4 × URM-1			6 × URM-1	6 × URM-1
First stage	URM-1							
Second stage	Briz-KM	URM-2			—N/a	URM-2V	KVTK-A7	URM-2
Third stage (optional)	—N/a	—N/a	Briz-M; RCAF	Briz-M; Blok DM-03; KVTK	—N/a	Blok DM-03; KVTK	—N/a	KVTK2-А7В
Thrust (at sea level)	1.92 MN (430,000 lb_{f})	1.92 MN (430,000 lb_{f})	5.77 MN (1,300,000 lb_{f})	9.61 MN (2,160,000 lb_{f})	9.61 MN (2,160,000 lb_{f})	10.57 MN (2,380,000 lb_{f})	13.44 MN (3,020,000 lb_{f})	?
Launch weight	149 t (328,000 lb)	171.5 t (378,000 lb)	481 t (1,060,000 lb)	759 t (1,673,000 lb)	713 t (1,572,000 lb)	815–821 t (1,797,000–1,810,000 lb)	1,133 t (2,498,000 lb)	1,323 t (2,917,000 lb)
Height (max.)	34.9 m (114 ft 6 in)	41.5 m (136 ft 2 in)	45.8 m (150 ft 3 in)	55.4 m (181 ft 9 in)	?	?	?	65.7 m (215 ft 7 in)
Payload (LEO 200 km)	2 t (4,400 lb)	3.8 t (8,400 lb)	14.6 t (32,000 lb)	24.5 t (54,000 lb)	18 t (40,000 lb)	35–40 t (77,000–88,000 lb)	35 t (77,000 lb)	50 t (110,000 lb)
Payload (GTO)	—N/a	—N/a	2.4 / 3.6 t (5,300 / 7,900 lb)	5.4 / 7.5 t (12,000 / 17,000 lb)	—N/a	11.9–13.3 t (26,000–29,000 lb)	12.5 t (28,000 lb)	19 t (42,000 lb)
Payload (GEO)	—N/a	—N/a	1 / 2 t (2,200 / 4,400 lb)	3 / 4.6 t (6,600 / 10,100 lb)	—N/a	7.2–8 t (16,000–18,000 lb)	7.6 t (17,000 lb)	11.4 t (25,000 lb)

== Testing and manufacturing ==
The production of the Universal Rocket Modules and the Briz-M upper stages will take place at the Khrunichev subsidiary Production Corporation Polyot in Omsk. In 2009, Polyot invested over 771.4 million RUB (about US$25 million) in Angara production lines. Design and testing of the RD-191 engine was done by NPO Energomash, while its mass production will take place at the company Proton-PM in Perm, Russia.

== Launches ==
=== Facilities ===
Angara will primarily be launched from the Plesetsk Cosmodrome. Beginning in 2020, as of 2014, plans called for it to also be launched from the Vostochny Cosmodrome. This would have allowed the phase out of Proton, a rocket whose operation at Baikonur Cosmodrome, Kazakhstan has been objected to, due to its use of large amounts of highly toxic UDMH and N_{2}O_{4} and reliability issues.

=== Launch history ===
Date/time (UTC)	Configuration	Serial number	Launch pad	Outcome
Date/time (UTC)	Payload	Separation orbit	Operator	Function
Date/time (UTC)	Remarks			
9 July 2014; 12:00 UTC	Angara 1.2PP	71601	Plesetsk Cosmodrome, Site 35	Success
9 July 2014; 12:00 UTC	1,430 kg (3,150 lb) mass simulator	Suborbital	Roscosmos	Suborbital test flight
9 July 2014; 12:00 UTC	Non-standard Angara 1.2PP allowed flight testing of both URM-1 and URM-2			
23 December 2014; 05:57 UTC	Angara A5 / Briz-M	71751	Plesetsk Cosmodrome, Site 35	Success
23 December 2014; 05:57 UTC	2,000 kg (4,400 lb) mass simulator (MGM n°1)	Low Earth orbit	Roscosmos	Orbital test flight No.1
23 December 2014; 05:57 UTC	Maiden flight of Angara A5, mass simulator intentionally not separated from Briz-M upper stage			
14 December 2020; 05:50 UTC	Angara A5 / Briz-M	71752	Plesetsk Cosmodrome, Site 35/1	Success
14 December 2020; 05:50 UTC	2,400 kg (5,300 lb) mass simulator (MGM n°2)	Geosynchronous	Roscosmos	Orbital test flight No.2
14 December 2020; 05:50 UTC	Second orbital test flight			
27 December 2021; 19:00:00 UTC	Angara A5 / Persei	71753	Plesetsk Cosmodrome, Site 35/1	Partial Failure
27 December 2021; 19:00:00 UTC	5,400 kg (11,900 lb) mass simulator (MGM n°3)	Geocentric supersynchronous	Ministry of Defence	Orbital test flight No.3
27 December 2021; 19:00:00 UTC	First flight test of the Persei upper stage, a Blok DM-03 upper stage variant for Angara. Last of the three demonstration flights planned. Upper stage failed to restart for 2nd burn, leaving upper stage and payload in low Earth orbit. They decayed from orbit in a fortnight.			
29 April 2022; 19:55:22	Angara 1.2	71602	Plesetsk Cosmodrome, Site 35/1	Failure of Kosmos-2555 to reach stable orbit
29 April 2022; 19:55:22	EO MKA №2 (Kosmos-2555)	SSO	VKS	Reconnaissance
29 April 2022; 19:55:22	Maiden flight of Angara 1.2. No orbit-raising activities were detected from Kosmos-2555 following deployment, indicating a possible spacecraft failure. Re-entered May 18, 2022 after not making any attempt to raise its orbit.			
15 October 2022; 19:55:15	Angara 1.2	71603	Plesetsk Cosmodrome, Site 35/1	Success
15 October 2022; 19:55:15	EO MKA №3 (Kosmos-2560)	SSO	VKS	Reconnaissance
15 October 2022; 19:55:15	Kosmos 2560 decayed from orbit 10 Dec 2022 01:54 UTC, also quite soon after launch. Some suspect this was due to spacecraft failure.			
11 April 2024; 09:00	Angara A5 / Orion		Vostochny Cosmodrome, Site 1A	Success
11 April 2024; 09:00	No Payload(Mass simulator)	GEO	Roscosmos	Orbital test flight No.4
11 April 2024; 09:00	First flight of the Angara A5 from Vostochny Cosmodrome (Vostochny Angara Test Flight).			
17 September 2024; 07:01	Angara 1.2	71604	Plesetsk Cosmodrome, Site 35/1	Success
17 September 2024; 07:01	Kosmos-2577; Kosmos-2578	SSO	VKS	Reconnaissance
16 March 2025; 10:50	Angara 1.2	71605	Plesetsk Cosmodrome, Site 35/1	Success
16 March 2025; 10:50	Kosmos-2585; Kosmos-2586; Kosmos-2587	LEO	VKS	Communications
19 June 2025; 03:00	Angara A5 / Briz-M	71754	Plesetsk Cosmodrome, Site 35/1	Success
19 June 2025; 03:00	Kosmos 2589 (14F166A)	GEO	VKS	Classified
21 August 2025; 09:32	Angara 1.2	71606	Plesetsk, Site 35/1	Success
21 August 2025; 09:32	Kosmos-2591 (OO MKA №3); Kosmos-2592 (OO MKA №4); Kosmos-2593 (OO MKA №5); Kosmos-2594 (OO MKA №6)	SSO	VKS	Reconnaissance
25 November 2025; 13:42	Angara 1.2	71607	Plesetsk, Site 35/1	Success
25 November 2025; 13:42	Kosmos-2597 (Strela-3M №22); Kosmos-2598 (Strela-3M №23); Kosmos-2599 (Strela-3M №24)	LEO	VKS	Military communications
23 April 2026; 08:29	Angara 1.2	71608	Plesetsk, Site 35/1	Success
23 April 2026; 08:29	Unknown Kosmos satellite	LEO	VKS	Military communications
Future Launches
2028	Angara A5		Vostochny Cosmodrome, Site 1A	TBD
2028	Orel	LEO	Roscosmos	Space capsule
2028	Uncrewed test launch of Orel spacecraft. First launch of Angara A5 from Vostochny.			
2028	Angara A5P		Vostochny Cosmodrome, Site 1A	TBD
2028	Orel	LEO	Roscosmos	Space capsule
2028	Uncrewed test launch of Orel to the International Space Station. First flight of the Angara A5P, a crew-rated variant of the Angara A5.			
2028	Angara A5P		Vostochny Cosmodrome, Site 1A	TBD
2028	Orel	LEO	Roscosmos	Space capsule
2028	Crewed test launch of Orel to the International Space Station.			
2029	Angara A5		Vostochny Cosmodrome, Site 1A	TBD
2029	Luna 27A	Selenocentric	Roscosmos	Lunar lander
2029	Third mission of Luna-Glob Programme.			
NET 2029	Angara A5P		Vostochny Cosmodrome, Site 1A	TBD
NET 2029	Orel	LEO	Roscosmos	Space capsule
NET 2029	Crewed Orel flight test.			
2030	Angara A5		Vostochny Cosmodrome, Site 1A	TBD
2030	Luna 27B	Selenocentric	Roscosmos	Lunar lander
2030	Fourth mission of Luna-Glob Programme.			
NET 2030	Angara A5P		Vostochny Cosmodrome, Site 1A	TBD
NET 2030	Orel	LEO	Roscosmos	Space capsule
NET 2030	Crewed Orel flight test.			
2031	Angara A5M / DM-03		Vostochny Cosmodrome, Site 1A	TBD
2031	Spektr-UV	IGSO	Roscosmos	Ultraviolet space telescope
2032	Angara A5		Vostochny Cosmodrome, Site 1A	TBD
2032	Luna 29	Selenocentric	Roscosmos	Lunar orbiter
2032	Fifth mission of Luna-Glob Programme.			
2034	Angara A5 / DM-03		Vostochny Cosmodrome, Site 1A	TBD
2034	Luna 28	Selenocentric	Roscosmos	Lunar lander / Lunar sample return
2034	Lunar sample-return mission.			
2035	Angara A5V		Vostochny Cosmodrome, Site 1A	TBD
2035	Spektr-M	Sun-Earth L2 Lagrange Point	Roscosmos	Millimeter wavelength space telescope

== Related projects ==
The South Korean launch vehicle Naro-1 used a first stage derived from Angara's URM-1 (fitted with a lower-thrust version of the RD-191 engine called RD-151). The vehicle made its first flight on 25 August 2009. The flight was not successful, but the first stage operated as expected. A second launch on 10 June 2010 ended in failure, when contact with the rocket was lost 136 seconds after launch. The Joint Failure Review Board failed to come to a consensus on the cause of the failure. The third flight on 30 January 2013 successfully reached orbit.

== Comparable rockets ==
- UMLV
- Titan IIIC
- Ariane 5
- Vega
- H-IIA
- H-IIB
- Atlas V
- Falcon 9 Full Thrust
- Delta IV
- Long March 3
- Long March 5
- LVM 3
- Naro-1 — first stage derived from URM-1
- Rus-M
- Proton
- Antares

== See also ==
- Comparison of orbital launchers families
- Comparison of orbital launch systems
