= RD-193 =

Russian liquid-fuei rocket engine

RD-193 (РД-193)
- Country of origin: Russia
- Date: 2011
- Designer: NPO Energomash
- Application: Main engine
- Predecessor: RD-191

Liquid-fuel engine
- Propellant: LOX / RP-1
- Cycle: Oxidizer-rich staged combustion

Configuration
- Chamber: 1

Performance
- Thrust, vacuum: 2,085 kN (469,000 lbf)
- Thrust, sea-level: 1,920 kN (430,000 lbf)
- Thrust-to-weight ratio: 103
- Specific impulse, vacuum: 337.5 s (3.310 km/s)
- Specific impulse, sea-level: 311.2 s (3.052 km/s)

Dimensions
- Length: 3.02 m (9 ft 11 in)
- Diameter: 2.1 m (6 ft 11 in)
- Dry mass: 1,900 kg (4,200 lb)

The RD-193 (Russian: Ракетный Двигатель-193, romanized: Raketnyy Dvigatel-193, lit. 'Rocket Engine 193') is a high performance single-combustion chamber rocket engine, developed in Russia from 2011 to 2013. It is derived from the RD-170 originally used in the Energia launcher.

The RD-193 is fueled by a kerosene / LOX mixture and uses an oxygen-rich staged combustion cycle. RD-193 was proposed as a replacement for the NK-33, which was being used in the Soyuz-2-1v vehicle.

== Design ==
The engine is a simplified version of the RD-191, omitting the swing assembly chamber and its related structural elements, thus reducing size and weight (300 kg) and lowering cost.

== See also ==
- Comparison of orbital rocket engines
