= Universal Rocket Module =

URM-1
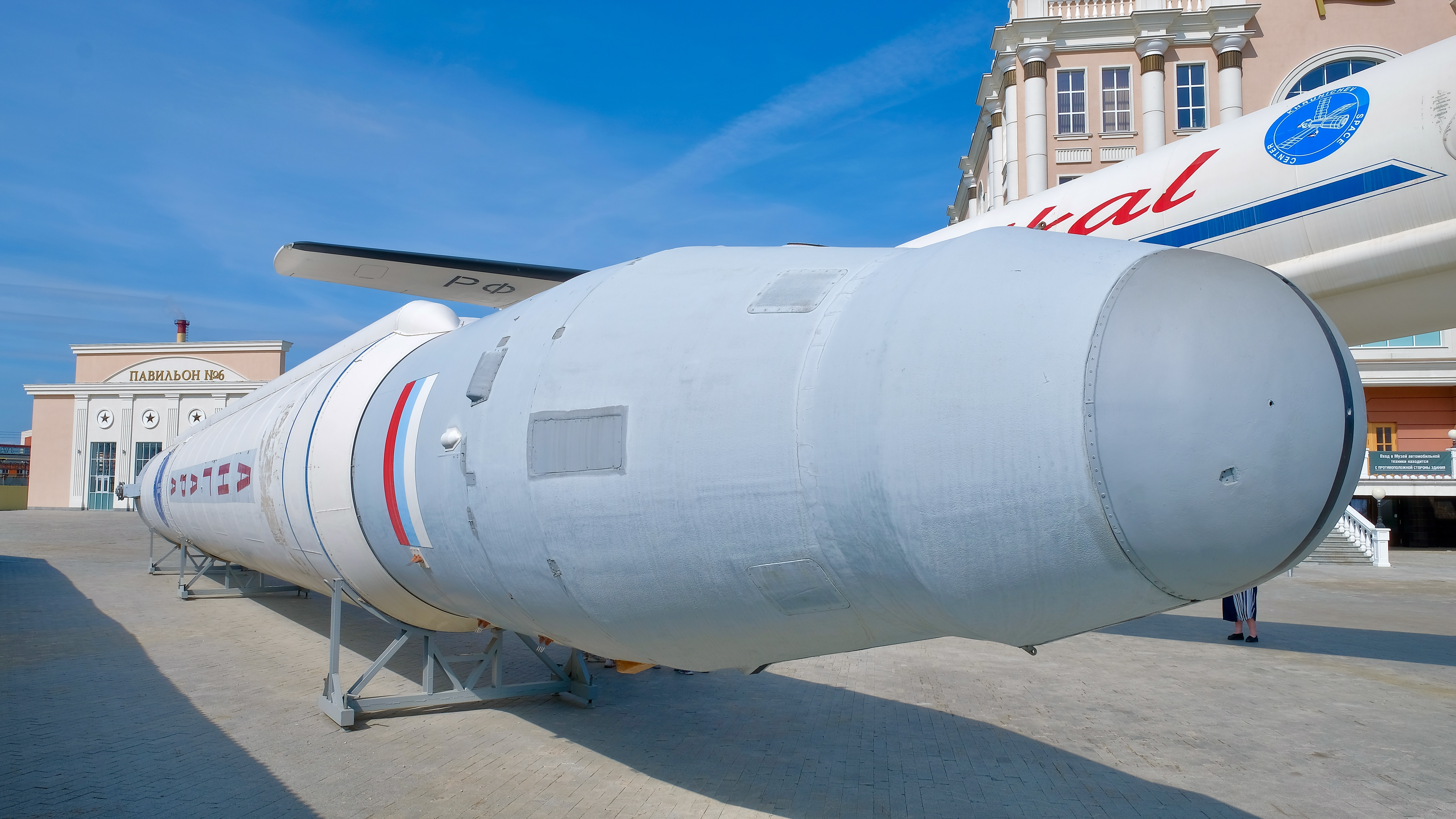
- An Angara/URM booster at the UMMC Museum Complex
- Manufacturer: Khrunichev
- Country of origin: Russia
- Used on: Angara stage 1 and boosters

General characteristics
- Height: 25.7 m (84 ft)
- Diameter: 2.9 m (9 ft 6 in)
- Gross mass: 142,400 kg (313,900 lb)
- Propellant mass: 132,600 kg (292,300 lb)

URM-1
- Powered by: 1 RD-191
- Maximum thrust: 1,920 kN (430,000 lb_{f}) (sea level)
- Specific impulse: 311 seconds (3.05 km/s) (sea level)
- Burn time: Angara 1.2: 214 s Angara A5 Booster: 214 s Angara A5 Core: 325 s
- Propellant: LOX/Kerosene

Universal Rocket Module (URM) is the name of the modular liquid fuelled first and second stage of the Angara expendable launch system. The first stage and booster variant is referred to as URM-1, while the second stage is referred to as URM-2. The URM-2 is derived from the Soyuz-2 Block I second stage.

URM-1 is a unitary structure 2.9 meters in diameter and 25 meters in length that includes an oxidizer tank, a fuel tank (both tanks being coupled by a spacer) and an RD-191 engine burning RP-1 fuel with liquid oxygen producing a thrust of 1.92 MN. URM-1 was first flown in 2014 on the Angara 1.2PP suborbital test flight. Angara can fly with either one URM-1 in the case of Angara 1.2 and Angara 1.2PP, or one URM-1 as a sustainer core with four additional URM-1s as boosters for Angara A5.

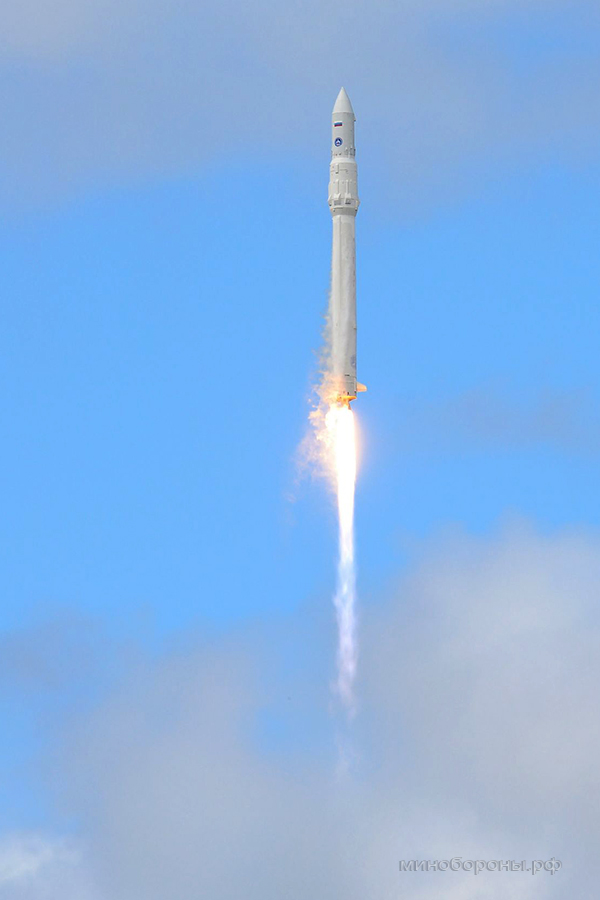
A single-booster Angara-1.2pp.

URM-2
- Manufacturer: Khrunichev
- Country of origin: Russia
- Used on: Angara A5 stage 2

General characteristics
- Height: 6.9 m (23 ft)
- Diameter: 3.6 m (12 ft)
- Propellant mass: 36,000 kg (79,000 lb)

URM-2
- Powered by: 1 RD-0124A
- Maximum thrust: 294 kN (66,000 lb_{f})
- Specific impulse: 359 seconds (3.52 km/s)
- Burn time: 424 s
- Propellant: LOX/Kerosene

URM-2 is a modified Block I stage, 3.6 meters in diameter and 6.9 meters in length. It is powered by a single RD-0124A producing 294 kilonewtons, derived from Block I's RD-0124. URM-2 was first flight tested on Angara 1.2PP, but will fly in operation only on the Angara A5. The operational Angara 1.2 will also use a modified Block I powered by the RD-0124A as a second stage, though this stage will have a diameter of no more than 2.9 meters.

The Naro-1 launch vehicle was based on the URM-1 with a reduced thrust RD-191, called RD-151, combined with a solid-fueled second stage built by Republic of Korea KARI.

== See also ==
- Universal Rocket
- Angara rocket family
- Liquid rocket booster
- Common Core Booster, similar concept for Atlas V
- Common Booster Core, similar concept for Delta IV
