= RD-0243 =

RD-0244 (РД-0244)
- Country of origin: Soviet Union
- First flight: 1981-12-27
- Designer: OKB-154
- Associated LV: RSM-54, Shtil'
- Status: Retired

Liquid-fuel engine
- Propellant: N_{2}O_{4} / UDMH
- Mixture ratio: 2.6
- Cycle: Oxidizer Rich Staged combustion

Configuration
- Chamber: 1

Performance
- Thrust: 682 kilonewtons (153,000 lbf)
- Chamber pressure: 27.5 megapascals (3,990 psi)
- Specific impulse, vacuum: 310 s (3.0 km/s)
- Specific impulse, sea-level: 280 s (2.7 km/s)
- Burn time: 74 seconds

Used in
- RD-0243 Propulsion Module

RD-0245 (РД-0245)
- Country of origin: USSR
- First flight: 1981-12-27
- Designer: OKB-154
- Associated LV: RSM-54, Shtil'
- Status: Retired

Liquid-fuel engine
- Propellant: N_{2}O_{4} / UDMH
- Mixture ratio: 2.6
- Cycle: Gas Generator

Configuration
- Chamber: 4
- Nozzle ratio: 14

Performance
- Thrust: 211 kilonewtons (47,000 lbf)
- Chamber pressure: 14.7 megapascals (2,130 psi)
- Specific impulse, vacuum: 300 s (2.9 km/s)
- Specific impulse, sea-level: 280 s (2.7 km/s)
- Burn time: 79 seconds

Used in
- RD-0243 Propulsion Module

The RD-0243 (Russian: Ракетный Двигатель-0243, romanized: Raketnyy Dvigatel-0243, lit. 'Rocket Engine 0243') is a propulsion module composed of an RD-0244 main engine and a RD-0245 vernier thruster. Both are liquid-fuel rocket engines, burning a hypergolic mixture of unsymmetrical dimethylhydrazine (UDMH) fuel with dinitrogen tetroxide (N_{2}O_{4}) oxidizer. The RD-0244 main engine operates in the oxidizer rich staged combustion cycle, while the vernier RD-0245 uses the simpler gas generator cycle. Since volume is at a premium on submarine launches, this module is submerged on the propellant tank. Its development period was from 1977 to 1985, having had its first launch on December 27, 1981. Originally developed for the RSM-54, it was used later for the Shtil'.

== See also ==
- R-29RM Shtil
- Shtil'
- Rocket engine using liquid fuel
