= KVTK (rocket stage) =

Russian rocket stage

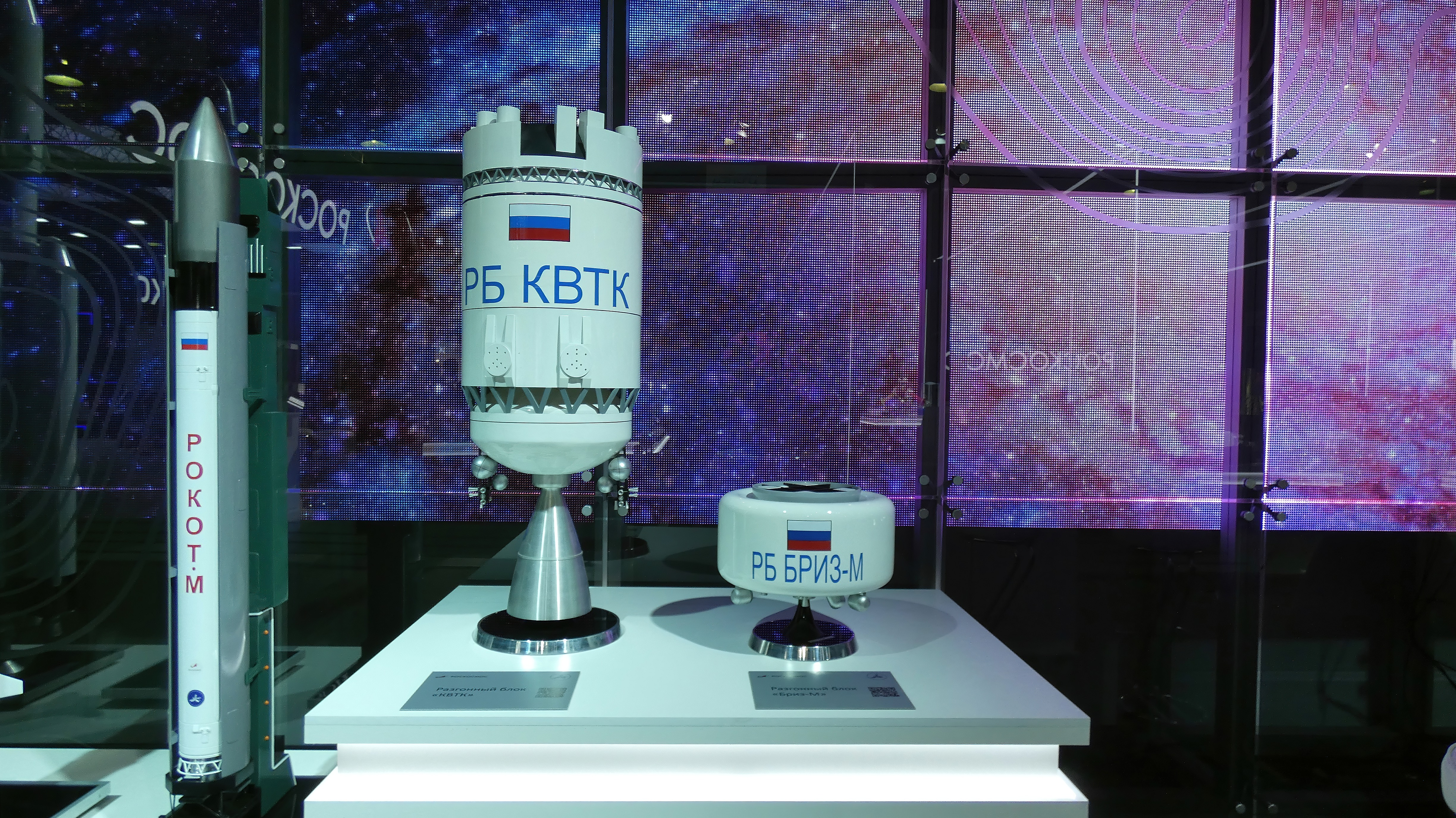
- KVTK (left) and Briz-M (right) upper stages
- Manufacturer: Khrunichev
- Country of origin: Russia
- Used on: Angara A5 (upper stage)

General characteristics
- Height: 10.4 m (34 ft)
- Diameter: 3.8 m (12 ft)
- Propellant mass: 19,600 kg (43,200 lb)
- Powered by: 1 × RD-0146D
- Maximum thrust: 68.6 kN (15,400 lb_{f})
- Specific impulse: 463 s (4.54 km/s)
- Burn time: 1,350 seconds
- Propellant: LOX / LH2

The KVTK (Russian: Кислородно-Водородный Тяжёлого Класса, romanized: Kislorodno-Vodorodnyy Tyazhologo Klassa, lit. 'Oxygen-Hydrogen Heavy Class') is a liquid oxygen/hydrogen upper stage for high energy orbits that is currently under development. The KVTK contains an RD-0146D engine and is designed for use on Angara rockets. KVTK would be the first hydrogen-powered upper stage for use on a Russian launch vehicle, although Khrunichev has previously produced a hydrogen-powered upper stage (KVD-1) for the Indian Space Research Organisation's GSLV. KVTK is designed to provide up to five ignitions, allowing for complex orbital maneuvering, and have an on-orbit lifespan of up to nine hours. KVTK would allow an increase in payload to GTO of 20-50% compared to the Angara A5's standard Briz-M upper stage, powered by UDMH and N_{2}O_{4}.

== History ==
The KVTK was originally studied as an upper stage for the Energia family of rockets, but in 1987 was superseded by the RCS stage (Retro and Corrections Stage), based loosely on the American S-IVB. In 1996, consideration was briefly given to constructing a KVTK-derived Russian Propulsion Module for the International Space Station. Most likely, this module would have been transported to the ISS by a Space Shuttle.

On 10 December 2020, Roscosmos signed a 20.6 billion Russian ruble (US$279M as of December 2020) contract with Khrunichev to manufacture KVTK test models and flight test them by December 2025.

In August 2021, Khrunichev announced that the first flight test of the KVTK is expected to occur in 2027 on an Angara-A5M launch vehicle.

== Variants ==
The KVSK (RCAF) would be a smaller cryogenic stage carrying 10,760 kilograms (23,720 lb) of propellant for the proposed Angara A3, while the KVSK-A7 would be a larger stage loaded with 26,500 kilograms (58,400 lb) for the proposed Angara A7.
