= RD-0146 =

Russian rocket engine

- Model of RD-0146
- Country of origin: Russia
- Date: 2001
- Designer: KBKhA Design Bureau
- Manufacturer: TsSKB Progress
- Application: Upper stage engine
- Associated LV: KVTK

Liquid-fuel engine
- Propellant: LOX / LH_{2}
- Cycle: Expander cycle

Configuration
- Chamber: 1

Performance
- Thrust, vacuum: 98.1 kN (22,100 lbf)
- Chamber pressure: 7.9 megapascals (1,150 psi)
- Specific impulse, vacuum: 463 seconds (4.54 km/s)

Dimensions
- Length: 2.2 metres (7 ft 3 in)
- Diameter: 1.25 metres (4 ft 1 in)
- Dry mass: 242 kg (534 lb)

The RD-0146 (Russian: Ракетный Двигатель-0146, romanized: Raketnyy Dvigatel-0146, lit. 'Rocket Engine 0146') is a liquid-fuel cryogenic rocket engine developed by KBKhA Kosberg in Voronezh, Russia.

The RD-0146 is the first Russian rocket engine to burn liquid oxygen and liquid hydrogen in the expander cycle, in which turbopumps are driven by waste heat absorbed in the nozzle and combustion chamber. The RD-0146 featured the fastest-spinning turbopump of any serially produced rocket engine: the fuel turbopump spun at over 120,000 rpm. The RD-0146M variant uses liquified natural gas as a fuel instead of hydrogen, while the RD-0146D variant is projected to produce specific impulse (I_{sp}) as high as 470 seconds (4.6 km/s) in a vacuum.

The engine has been proposed for use on multiple carrier rockets throughout its history. RD-0146 variants were, at various times, selected to power new upper stages for Proton, Angara, Onega (a development of Soyuz-2), and Rus-M. As of 2022, the RD-0146D is in development for use on the KVTK upper stage.

== Development ==
In 1988, RSC Energia directed KBKhA to begin work on a new preburner-less LOX/LH_{2} rocket engine for use on upper stages, the RO-95. Though this 10 tf (98 kN) engine never left the design phase, its development confirmed the reliability and performance of the expander cycle to KBKhA.

In 1999, a new expander-cycle engine project began. In that year, GKNPTs Khrunichev awarded a contract to KBKhA to develop a new engine, the RD-0146U, for use on its Proton and Angara launch vehicles. The engine was to be of around 10 tf (98 kN) thrust class. Soon after, on 7 April 2000, the American company Pratt & Whitney Rocketdyne entered an agreement with KBKhA, financing the development of the RD-0146. Pratt & Whitney would gain exclusive international marketing rights to this variant. In 2002, RSC Energia awarded KBKhA with a contract to develop the RD-0146E variant for use on its Onega launch vehicle, a Soyuz-2 variant with a fully cryogenic upper stage. In 2008, KBKhA began development of the RD-0146D variant for use on the KVTK upper stage for Angara A5. In 2009, TsSKB Progress selected the RD-0146 for use on the new Rus-M launch vehicle's second stage.

The first RD-0146 engine was planned to be delivered to Pratt & Whitney in May 2001. Delays attributed to subcontractor production troubles postponed this, and the first live firing of a production engine took place on 9 October 2001. A second engine was built and fired in December 2002, and was subsequently delivered to Pratt & Whitney in March 2003.

The RD-0146 used a different testing methodology than previous Soviet and Russian engine trial programs. Individual components and subsystems would be tested separately, while earlier testing would use an all-up method, in which an entire engine was assembled and tested. This meant that a single component failure would make it necessary to disassemble the system to detect flaws.

In order to facilitate test firings of the RD-0146, a new liquid hydrogen production plant was constructed, with a capacity of 100 kg (220 lb) per day. This became the second such facility in Russia.

== Description ==
The RD-0146 is the first Russian rocket engine not to feature a preburner. It is also the first to have a nozzle extension without an active cooling system, as well as the first engine by KBKhA to feature separate fuel and oxidiser turbopumps. The engine is capable of five firings and thrust control in two planes. According to the developer, the lack of a gas generator system ensures higher reliability of the engine for multiple firings, by removing the potential of an ignition failure in the engine power cycle.

== Related development ==
LM10-MIRA is a liquid oxygen-liquid methane demonstrator engine developed by Avio and KBKhA on the basis of the RD-0146. Development began under the terms of an agreement signed between the Italian and Russian governments in Moscow on November 28, 2000. The 7.5 tonnes-force engine was successfully tested in June 2014 in Voronezh, Russia. After the end of the collaboration with KHBhA, Avio continued the development of the M10 engine for the Vega-E program with a target thrust of 10 tonnes-force. As of March 2021, the engine ground qualification is foreseen for 2024.

== See also ==
- Avio M10, a derived engine in development for Vega
- Comparison of orbital rocket engines

=== Comparable engines ===
- Rocketdyne RL10
- RL60
- HM7B
- YF-75D
- Vinci
- LE-5B-2
- CE-7.5
- KVD-1
