= Spektr-M =

Russian scientific satellite

Spektr-M Спектр-M Millimetron
- Mission type: Sub-millimeter / Far-infrared
- Operator: Russian Astro Space Center
- Website: http://millimetron.ru/index.php/en/

Spacecraft properties
- Manufacturer: NPO Lavochkin
- Payload mass: 6,240 kg (13,757 lb)

Start of mission
- Launch date: 2035 (planned)
- Rocket: Angara A5
- Launch site: Vostochny Site 1A
- Contractor: Roscosmos

Orbital parameters
- Reference system: Sun–Earth L_{2}
- Regime: Halo orbit

Main telescope
- Diameter: 10 m (33 ft)
- Wavelengths: 0.02 to 17mm

Spektr-M (Russian: Спектр-M) is a proposed Russian scientific satellite with a 10 m (33 ft) sub-millimeter to far-infrared space telescope. It is designed to be a successor to the Herschel Space Observatory, covering similar wave bands, and to look into chemical evolution in the universe, black hole horizon radiation, and dark energy investigation. Spacecraft design documentation and prototyping is currently underway. Due to repeated budget cuts since 2019, the launch is not expected until 2035.

== Overview ==
The purpose of this mission is to study the universe in millimeter to far infra-red wavelengths. The Herschel mission did a similar job with a smaller dish of 3.5 m (11 ft), and this is a follow-up mission. The instruments are to be cooled with liquid helium to 4.5K for part of the mission, but sun shields will allow it to continue in a degraded mode once the coolant evaporates.

It will be placed in a halo orbit around the Sun–Earth L_{2} Lagrangian point.
