= Chemical Automatics Design Bureau =

Russian rocket engine manufacturer

KBKhA. Chemical Automatics Design Bureau

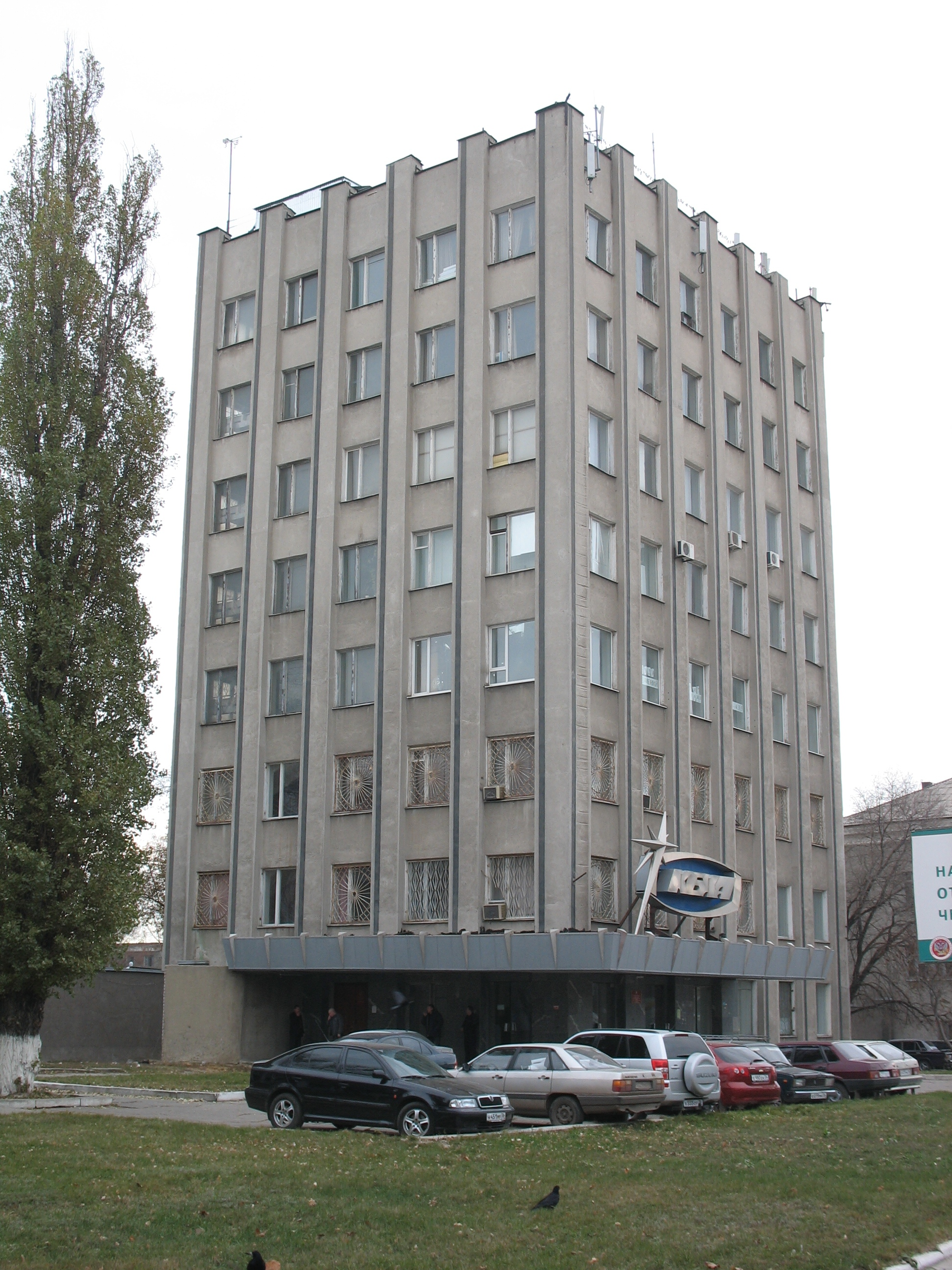
- KBKhA building
- Formerly: OKB-154
- Industry: Rocket engines
- Founded: Voronezh, USSR (April 2, 1946; 80 years ago)
- Headquarters: Voronezh, Russia
- Key people: Viktor Dmitrievich Gorokhov, Chief designer
- Products: Spacecraft propulsion, rocket engines
- Revenue: $53.2 million (31 December 2015)
- Operating income: $1.07 million (31 December 2015)
- Net income: −$2.14 million (31 December 2015)
- Total assets: $14 million (31 December 2015)
- Total equity: $58.3 million (31 December 2015)
- Parent: Roscosmos
- Website: kbkha.ru

Chemical Automatics Design Bureau
- Coordinates: 51.5844°N 39.1708°E

Chemical Automatics Design Bureau (CADB), also KB Khimavtomatiki (Russian: Конструкторское бюро химавтоматики, КБХА, KBKhA), is a Russian design bureau founded by the NKAP (People's Commissariat of the Aircraft Industry) in 1941 and led by Semyon Kosberg until his death in 1965. Its origin dates back to a 1940 Moscow carburetor factory, evacuated to Berdsk in 1941, and then relocated to Voronezh city in 1945, where it now operates. Originally designated OKB-296 and tasked to develop fuel equipment for aviation engines, it was redesignated OKB-154 in 1946.

In 1965 A.D. Konopatov took over leadership. He was succeeded by V.S. Rachuk in 1993, then by Viktor D. Gorokhov (RD-0124 Chief designer) in 2015. During this time the company designed a wide range of high technology products, including liquid propellant rocket engines, a nuclear reactor for space use, the first Soviet laser with an output of 1 MW and the USSR's only operational nuclear rocket engine. The company has designed more than 60 liquid propellant engines with some 30 having entered production.

In November 2019, the design bureau and the Voronezh Mechanical Plant were merged.

== World War II ==
KB Khimavtomatiki's original mandate was to develop aviation fuel systems for Soviet military during World War II. Kosberg had spent ten years working at the Central Institute of Aircraft Engine Construction on fuel systems and was tapped to run the new bureau. Approaching German armies required the group to relocate to Berdsk, Siberia, where Kosberg and his team of about 30 specialists developed direct injection fuel systems, eventually implemented on the La-5, La-7, Tupolev Tu-2 and Tu-2D. The new fuel systems provided a significant increase in performance over conventional gasoline fuel systems and eliminated carburetor float problems caused by aggressive combat flying. They competed with direct injection systems developed by Daimler Benz at the time. After the end of the war, the design bureau was moved to Voronezh, where it continued to design fuel systems for piston, turboprop and jet aircraft.

== KBKhA Rocket Engine Company Maturity Years ==
Successful work results were a basis for the reformation of Plant 154 Design Bureau into the independent company OKB-154. The new enterprise was to develop rocket engines.

The works were performed in two directions: development of LREs for space launch vehicles (LV) and missiles. Start of works was marked by the meeting of S. Kosberg and S. Korolev on February 10, 1958. The result of this meeting was the joint development of oxygen-kerosene engine RD0105 for LV “Luna” LV stage (engine chief designer V. Koshelnikov). This engine allowed LV to reach second space velocity for the first time in the world, deliver USSR pennon to the Moon surface, make the round flight of the Moon and take pictures of Moon back side. Later on, one of the craters on its backside was named after S. Kosberg.

KBKhA developed LRE RD0109 for “Vostok” LV third stage (chief designer – V. Koshelnikov) on the basis of engine RD0105. The engine was more reliable and had higher technical specifications due to the creation of the new efficient lightweight combustion chamber. RD 0109 thrusts to orbit space ship Vostok with Y. Gagarin on board, all one-seat crewed ships and different military and scientific spacecraft later. The development of space industry in the end of the 50th and beginning of 60th required the creation of more powerful LV for orbiting objects with mass up to 7000 kg. To fulfill this purpose, the Design bureau – on the basis of second stage engine RD0106 of military rocker P-9A - developed engines RD0107, RD0108, and RD0110 (chief designer Y. Gershkovits) for third stages of S. Korolev LVs “Molnia”, “Voshod”, “Soyuz” that ensured launches of interplanetary stations to Mars and Venus, orbiting space ships with 2 and 3 cosmonauts on board. Members of these crews were the first human beings entering into open space, made orbit docking and joint flight of two ships, including American “Apollo”. LV “Soyuz” is used to deliver payload to orbital stations. Using highly reliable engine RD0110, over 1500 LV successful launches were performed. In the beginning of 1965, chief designer S. Kosberg died in a car accident. A. Konopatov was appointed as a lead designer of the Design Bureau.

=== New Projects – New Engines. Seventies of last century ===
Another milestone in the development of Russian space industry was the creation of powerful LV UR500 by General designer V. Chelomey. The LV was able to orbit heavy objects with weight up to 20 tons. For the second stage of LV “Proton” KBKhA created LRE RD0208 and RD0209 (chief designer V. Kozelkov), operating according to oxidizer rich preburner staged combustion schematic. As a prototype, engine RD0206 was used, installed on military missile UR-200. This LV orbited heavy automated stations “Proton”. LV UR500 was later named “Proton”. Three-stage “Proton” was a more powerful LV, for whose second stage engines RD0208 and RD0209 were modernized. The modernized engines got indexes RD0210 and RD0211 (chief designer V. Kozelkov). For the third stage engine, RD0212 was renewed (chief designer Y. Gershkovits). Besides, for the position correction of “Almaz” space station, launched by “Proton”, KBKhA created pressure fed engine RD0225 (chief designer V. Borodin) and multiple startup (up to 100 times), with orbit stand-by mode (up to 2 years). These LV delivered Lunar excursion modules to the Moon, interplanetary spacecraft that took probes of lunar soil and landed on Mars and Venus. It became possible to launch long-stay orbital stations “Salut” and “Mir”, as well as modules “Zarya” and “Zvezda” for International space station. For the moment, over 300 “Proton” LV launches have been performed. Technical perfection of engines RD0110, RD0210, RD0211, RD0212 ensured their long life. For over 40 years these engines have launched different spacecraft, automated stations, and crewed space ships. High energy-weight characteristics and operation simplicity support their position in the best of Russian and foreign engines of the same class.

=== Created Nuclear-Rocket Umbrella ===
One of KBKhA priority directions was the completion of defense contracts – creation of LREs with high energy characteristics and reliability, with low production costs, without servicing during entire life. In 1957, using extensive experience acquired during the development of engines RD0100, RD0101, RD0102 for interceptors, the Design Bureau started the creation of engines for antiaircraft missiles (SAM) on self-ignited components. The first LRE RD0200 (chief designer A. Golubev) was developed for the second stage of S. Lavochkin 5В11 SAM. The engine was designed as open cycle engine with 1 : 10 throttle capability. The engine passed all types of tests and was serially manufactured LRE RD0201 (chief designer L. Pozdnyakov) was designed for the third stage of P. Grushin B1100 SAM. The difference of the engine from RD0200 was four swivel combustion chambers due to which flight navigation was performed. In the end of the 50th, the question about the creation of a more powerful rocket R-9 arose, which was to replace rocket 8K72. In 1959-1962 the Design Bureau developed oxygen-kerosene engine RD0106 for LV second stage (block B) (chief designer – Y. Gershkovitz). High energy characteristics, optimum mounting, relatively small height, simple operation, development time (on ground and flight) were the basis for the development of a variety of engines for Korolev's space rockets, including RD0110 for the third stage (block И) of Soyuz LV. In the beginning of the 60th, long-term and prolific cooperation of KBKhA and Chelomey Design Bureau started, for whose LVs our design bureau developed about 20 LREs. The creation of powerful LVs during these years required considerable increase of energy characteristics and operational features of LREs. And KBKhA was among the first to start the development of such LREs. In 1961-1964 RD0203 and RD0204 LREs (chief designer V. Kozelkov) for the first stage of rocket UR200 and RD0206 and RD0207 LREs (chief designer L. Pozdnyakov) for the second stage of the same rocket were developed. These new engines were of advanced design, operate on storable fuel components and for the first time staged combustion cycle was used. The application of such schematic allowed double combustion chamber pressure (up to 150 kg/cm2 as compared to 70 kg/cm2 for open cycle engines) and excluded Isp losses for TPA turbine drive. Powerful and highly economical engines created in short time, went through ground development and flight tests. The engines were a basis for the creation of new LREs. In 1963, Chelomei Design Bureau started the creation of the new rocket RS-10 for first stage KBKhA developed engines RD0216 and RD0217 were used in 1963-1966 (chief designer V. Koshelnikov). Higher technical and operational requirements to LV defined the necessity of high engine efficiency and reliability, protection of its inner cavities from the environment, etc. All these requirements were fulfilled and confirmed by ground and flight development testing as rocket component. The experience acquired was the basis for development of new generation engines with higher combustion chamber pressures. First engines of this type were RD0233 and RD0234 (chief designer V. Kozelkov, lead designer V. Ezhov), created in 1969-1974 for RS-18 rocket first stage. Further on, two engines were developed: staged combustion RD0235, and open cycle steering engine RD0236 (chief designer V. Kozelkov, lead designer Y. Garmanov) for RS-18 rocket second stage. Engine RD0235 was developed on the basis of RD0216 engine but it is more reliable due to better design and technology possibilities The experience of LRE development was the basis for the engagement of KBKhA in 1967 in the development of engine RD0208 (lead designer Y. Gershkovich) for the second stage of rocket RS-20, designed by general designer M. Yangel. The engine was developed on the basis of a third stage engine RD0212, used in “Proton”, but it was more powerful and was differently applied within the stage.
The First Nuclear Rocket Engine In 1965 KBKhA was involved into project of the development of nuclear rocket engines RD0410 and RD0411 (chief designer G. Chursin, lead designers – L. Nikitin, M. Biryukov, A. Belogurov, Y. Mamontov). The engines were specified for the acceleration and deceleration of spacecraft and orbit correction for deep space explorations. Due to operating fluid high thermodynamic properties and high heating temperatures in the nuclear reactor, (up to 3 000 K), the engine possesses high efficiency (vacuum Isp 910 kg s/kg). For time and costs saving, the nuclear reactor and “cold” engine (feed system, regulation and control components) were developed in parallel. The nuclear reactor is designed according to heterogeneous schematic – its design utilizes block-mounting principle, which allowed to develop uranium-containing (fuel cell) assemblies and reactor separately. The results of the development of RD-0410 nuclear rocket engine were used for development of main turbopump of RD-0120 engine and were the basis for development of multimode space nuclear power plants.

=== First Gas-Dynamic Laser ===
In early 70s KBKhA began development of continuous high power, gas-dynamic of CO_{2}-lasers (GDL), operating on the transformation of the heat energy of active gaseous medium, obtained with non-equilibrium expansion in supersonic nozzle grid, into electromagnetic radiation. The family of GDL samples was created with radiation energy from 10 to 600 kW and space on-board GDL RD0600 working on gaseous propellant (the leading designers — V.P. Koshelnikov, G.I. Zavision, V.Y. Guterman).

== Liquid propellant rocket engines ==
By 1954 the bureau was designing liquid-propellant rocket engines for high performance and experimental aircraft, the Yak-27V and E-50A, and from 1957 to 1962 they designed engines for anti-aircraft guided missiles. By the early 1960s the bureau was designing Liquid Propellant Rocket Engines (LPREs) for man-rated space launch vehicles.

Over several decades, the CADB became one of the Soviet Union's premier developers of liquid rocket engines, designing engines for the SS-11, SS-18 and SS-19 and ballistic missiles, among others. In one unique design, the engine is submerged in the UDMH propellant tank to save space (SS-N-23 submarine-launched ballistic missile). They also designed upper stage engines for the Soyuz and Proton space launch vehicles, along with the core engines for the Energia. The large volume of design work and continuous refinement led to a high degree of technical capability. During this same period in the United States (late 1960s - early 1970s), liquid engines on missiles were dropped in favor of solids, and the only LPRE being developed was the Space Shuttle Main Engine. The Kosberg design bureau parlayed their experience into the RD-0120 - the Soviet Union's first cryogenic engine with over 40 tonnes thrust. Despite designing mostly LOX/Kerosene or N_{2}O_{4}/UDMH engines, the LOX/LH2 RD-0120 had similar ratings and performance as the SSME, but with a lower cost due to the choice of technology.

In 2007, the CADB was offering the RD-0146 engine to the international market as an alternative to the RL10. With a reduction in the market for LPRE's, the company expanded into related fields, designing products for oil and gas, agricultural and medical industries.

== Notable engine designs ==
Engine	Other Designations	Thermodynamic Cycle	Thrust, kN (vacuum)	Specific Impulse, s (vacuum)	Propellants	Engine Mass, kg	Development period	Notes
RD-0105	8D714	Gas Generator	49.4	316	LOX/Kerosene	130	1958-1960	Luna and Vostok-L, Block-E (third stage). Launched Luna 1 on the first man made object to escape velocity.
RD-0109	8D719	Gas Generator	54.5	323.5	LOX/Kerosene	121	1959-1965	Vostok-K and later Vostok, Block-E (third stage). Used lo launch Yuri Gagarin, the first human to space.
RD-0110	11D55, RD-461	Gas Generator	298	326	LOX/Kerosene	408	1963–1967	Soyuz, Molniya, 3rd stage,
RD-0120	11D122, RO-200	Staged Combustion	1962	455	LOX/LH2	3450	1967–1983	Energia, core, , ,
RD-0124	14D451M, 14D23	Staged Combustion	294	359	LOX/Kerosene	450	1996–1999	Soyuz, 3rd stage,
RD-0146		Expander	98	451	LOX/LH2	242	2000-	Replacement for the RL10A-4-1, ,
RD-0210	8D411K, RD-465, 8D49	Staged Combustion	598	326	N_{2}O_{4}/UDMH	565	1963–1967	Proton, 2nd stage
RD-0410	11B91	Expander	35.3	910	Nuclear/LH2	2000	1965–1994	The only operational nuclear engine in the USSR/Russia, , ,
RD-0243		Staged Combustion	825	300	N_{2}O_{4}/UDMH	853	1977–1985	SS-N-23 submarine-launched ballistic missile, , ,

== New Engines ==
The KBKhA team is actively working on the creation of the new rocket engines and power plants.

=== RD-0124 ===
Since 1993 the development of four-chamber LOX-kerosene LRE RD-0124, 14D23 (the chief designers — V. Koselkov and V. Gorokhov, the lead designers — V. Borodin, A. Plis and V. Gurin) for the third stage of the general designer D. Koslov "Soyuz-2" launch vehicle has been conducted. The main engine destination — delivery into the orbit of different payloads: satellites, cargo and crewed space vehicles. RD-0124 engine is developed as substitution for RD-0110. It has the practically identical interfaces, overall dimensions and mass, but it offers the higher specific parameters — the best of the developed LRE of this class. The engine operates according to oxidizer rich stage combustion cycle and has higher (on 33 s) efficiency compared to RD-0110. This will allow to put into orbit larger payloads (≈950 kg) or to ensure launching of "Soyuz-2" launch vehicle from spaceports located to the north of Baikonur. The conducted series of successful stand tests has confirmed the fulfillment of the specification requirements for main parameters. Two test-bench fire tests within LV “Soyuz-2” 3rd stage were performed that completed the 1st phase of on-ground engine development. December 27, 2006, first flight test of the engine within LV “Soyuz-2b” was performed. In 1998 KBKhA has studied and determined the possibility of using the RD-0124 (the RD-0124A) for the second stage of space rocket complex "Angara", created by Khrunichev Design and Research center and aimed for orbiting multiple purpose space vehicles. The main differences from the requirements to base engine are the change of engine operating time of the main and final thrust stage. On December 1, 2007, 150 fire tests were performed, with overall development time over 30,000 seconds, which confirmed the compliance of main parameters with Technical Task requirements. RD-0750 In 1993-1998 large volume of design, analysis, research and experimental work on development of a tri-propellant dual-mode engine on the base of RD-0120 was conducted as a KBKhA initiative. The propellants of the engine are: liquid hydrogen, kerosene, and liquid oxygen. Studies and recommendations of the other Russian R&D Institutes and foreign firms showed economic feasibility of application of dual-mode tri-propellant engines to advanced launch vehicles (especially single-staged) have become the real support for three-propellant engine works performance. The engine according to the first mode operates on oxygen and kerosene with the small addition of hydrogen and at the second operational mode - with oxygen and hydrogen. As a result of this work, for the first time, a three-propellant dual-mode preburner successfully tested in KBKhA and in RD0750D demonstrator conditions at NIICHIMMASH.

=== RD-0146 ===
In 1997 KBKhA according to the Khrunichev Space Center Technical Specification has begun the development of the new oxygen-hydrogen engine RD-0146 (the chief designer — N.E. Titkov, the lead designer — I.V. Liplavy) for space boosters of advanced launchers options «Proton» and «Angara». For the first time in Russia the expander cycle engine has been developed with insurance of multiple in-flight starts. Since 2001, 4 engines were manufactured, independent tests of engine subassemblies and chamber with igniter were performed at modes higher than nominal. Altogether 30 fire tests at mode up to 109.5% and with overall operational time 1680 seconds were completed. The development time per each engine was 1604 seconds in 27 tests.

=== RD-0126, RD-0126Э ===
In 1995 the research work for development expander kerosene-hydrogen LREs for advanced space boost units and interorbital tows has been initiated. It has defined the engine configuration and performances. This work was completed by issue of technical proposal. On the basis of this work RKK «Energia» has issued specification for RD-0126 engine development that was presented in two variants: Engine RD0126 - with a traditional Laval nozzle chamber, and RD0126Э with an expansion-deflection nozzle and ring throat (chief designer V. Gorokhov, lead designer – I. Liplyavy). Engine RD0126Э has the following advantages as compared to traditional LREs: equal length, but higher vacuum Isp; lighter weight with the same Isp; possibility to obtain higher hydrogen temperature in cooling channels, which allows to use it as working medium for TPA turbine rotation; possibility of engine ground testing performed under high-altitude conditions without gas-dynamic tube.

In 1998, test bench chamber with ring throat was tested. 5 sea level fire tests were performed that confirmed combustion products flow without boundary layer separation within high-altitude nozzle, which makes engine development considerably simpler. The calculated performance data complied with the design figures. Steady state operation process was stable; hardware is in satisfactory operable condition.

=== GPVRD 58L ===
Since 1994 according Baranov Central Institute of Aviation Motor Development specification KBKhA has been developed experimental axial symmetrical scramjet 58L (the lead designers — Y.V. Liplavy, Y.A. Martynenko), for studying of processes of hydrogen combustion at stream velocities 3–6.5 M and altitudes of 20–35 km flight conditions. The liquid hydrogen is an engine fuel passing CC cooling channels and being introduced into the combustion zones. The combustion chamber is an annular and three-zone design. In the first zone the hydrogen combustion takes place in subsonic airflow, in two others — in supersonic flow. The combustion chamber is completely designed and manufactured in KBKhA, and the new and advanced design and technological solutions have been realized. In 1998 the flight tests of scramjet on board Kholod laboratory have been successfully conducted. The engine operation started at flight velocity 3 M, at the end of the flight on 77 s the vehicle velocity reached 6.47 M. For the first time in the world hydrogen combustion has taken place under supersonic flow conditions. Engine has operated according to the test program and without remarks under testing program.

== Magnetoplasmadynamic engine ==
In 2013 the Chemical Automatics Design Bureau successfully conducted a test bench magnetoplasmadynamic engine for long-distance space travel. Magnetoplasmadynamic engine without flaws ion engines.

== Ion thruster ==
At the test facility Chemical Automation Design Bureau has successfully completed a series of initial tests of the high ion electric propulsion. Tests carried out successfully on a special stand vacuum and confirmed the compliance parameters of the engine characteristics, laid down in the specifications. Works with the engine continues: new tests planned for production resources and test the stability of proven performance in continuous operation. Creation of electric rocket engines was started in the company in 2012. By developing ion electric propulsion team started after KBKhA won the 2013 competition of the Ministry of Education and Science of the Russian Federation to receive subsidies for the realization of complex projects for the organization of high-tech production. The company was among the winners of the project "Creation of high-tech production and testing base for the development, Metal processing and industrial production of the new generation of electric propulsion."
