= RD-0124 =

Russian rocket engine

RD-0124 (14D23)
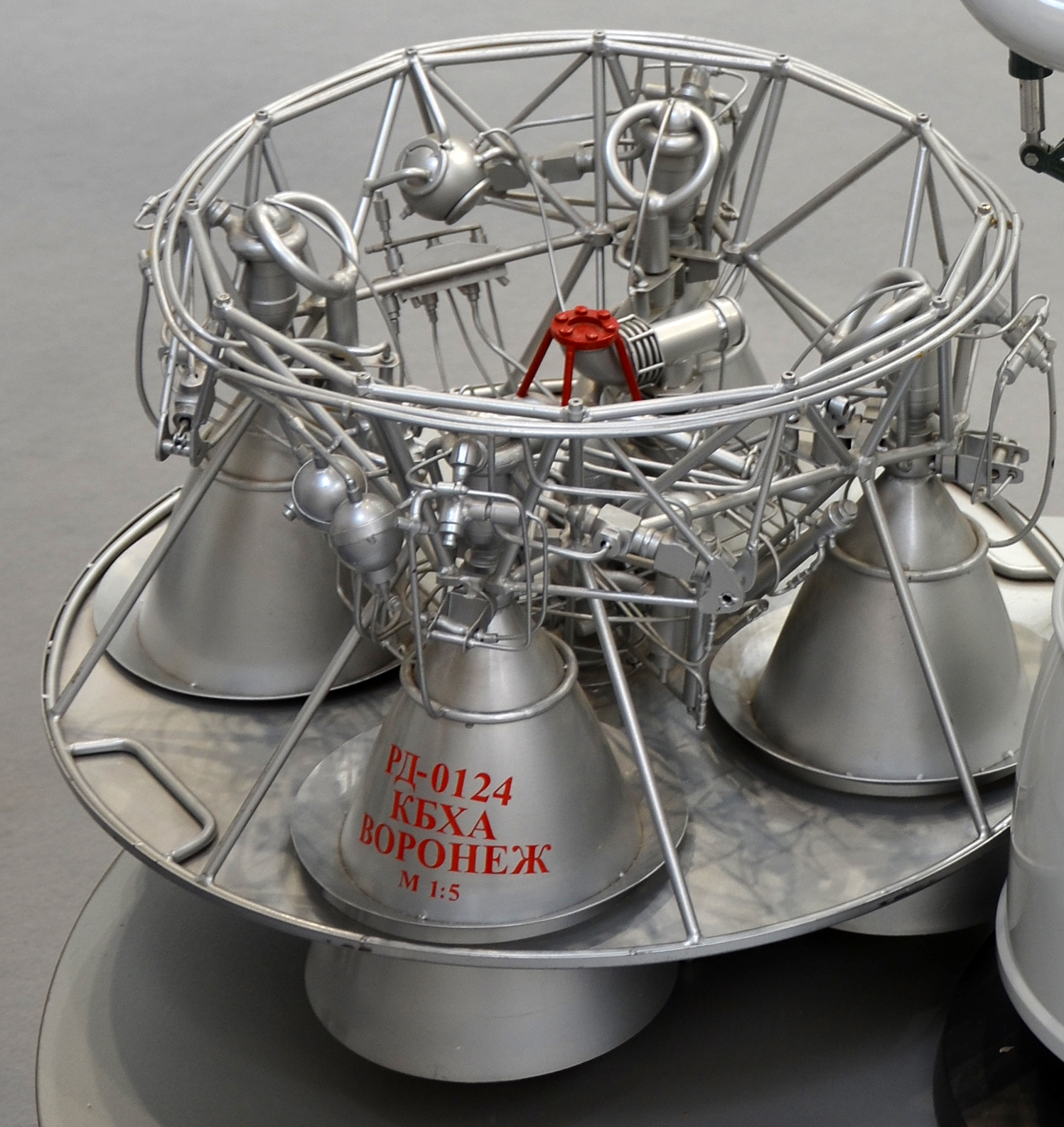
- RD-0124 model on display at the 2013 Paris Air Show
- Country of origin: Russia
- Date: 1993–2006
- First flight: 2006-12-27
- Designer: Valery Kozelkov and Viktor Gorokhov)
- Manufacturer: Chemical Automatics Design Bureau
- Application: Upper stage engine
- Associated LV: Current: Angara, Soyuz-2.1b, Soyuz-2.1v; Planned: Soyuz 5
- Predecessor: RD-0110
- Status: In production

Liquid-fuel engine
- Propellant: LOX / RG-1
- Cycle: Staged combustion

Configuration
- Chamber: 4

Performance
- Thrust, vacuum: 294.3 kN (66,200 lbf)
- Thrust-to-weight ratio: 52.5
- Chamber pressure: 15.7 MPa (2,280 psi)
- Specific impulse, vacuum: 359 s (3.52 km/s)
- Burn time: RD-0124: 270 seconds RD-0124A: 424 seconds

Dimensions
- Length: 1,575 mm (62.0 in)
- Diameter: 2,400 mm (94 in)
- Dry mass: RD-0124: 572 kg (1,261 lb); RD-0124A: 548 kg (1,208 lb)

Used in
- Soyuz 2.1b / Soyuz 2.1v Block I stage Angara URM-2 stage

The RD-0124 (Russian: Ракетный Двигатель-0124, romanized: Raketnyy Dvigatel-0124, lit. 'Rocket Engine 0124', GRAU index: 14D23) is a rocket engine burning liquid oxygen and kerosene in an oxygen-rich staged combustion cycle, developed by the Chemical Automatics Design Bureau in Voronezh. RD-0124 engines are used on the Block I stage used on Soyuz-2.1b and Soyuz-2.1v. A variant of the engine, the RD-0124A, is used on the Angara rocket family's URM-2 upper stage.

== Design ==
RD-0124 engines use a multi-stage turbopump powered by pre-combustion of the engine propellants in the preburner. The kerosene fuel is used for regenerative cooling of the engine. Vehicle attitude control during ascent is provided by gimbaling the engine in two planes. The propellant tanks are helium-pressurized. Four combustion chambers are fed by a single turbopump system. The engine operates at a high chamber pressure and, for the type of propellants used, achieves a very high specific impulse of nearly 360 seconds in vacuum.

== History ==
The inaugural flight of a launch vehicle using an RD-0124 engine took place on December 27, 2006, on the inaugural launch of the Soyuz-2.1b. Orbital Sciences considered using the RD-0124 in the High Energy Second Stage (HESS) for their Antares rocket. It would have replaced the Castor 30B second stage.

== Versions ==
This upper stage engine has been adapted to two different launch vehicles, the Soyuz 2.1b/v and the Angara family. As such, there are different versions:

- RD-0124 (GRAU Index 14D23). It is the version for the Soyuz 2.1b and Soyuz 2.1v Block I stage. It is the first liquid rocket engine designed in Russia after the Soviet period.
- RD-0124A It is the version that powers the Angara URM-2, both the 1.2 and the bigger 5 versions. It differs on the base model in having an extended burn time of 424 seconds and, at 548 kg (1,208 lb), being 24 kg (53 lb) lighter.
- RD-0124DR Version developed between 2008 and 2013 for the Soyuz 2.3 project. It would differ from the base version in the implementation of a throttled point of 176.6 kN (39,700 lbf) with a reduced chamber pressure of 9.5 MPa (1,380 psi) and a specific impulse of 347s. The throttling capability meant a redesign of the preburner and the combustion chamber.
- RD-0125A Single nozzle version of the RD-0124A, it is planned as an upgrade for the Angara URM-2. It would enable the use of dual engines, which would enhance performance and reduce launch cost. Probably only planned for the Angara-5 URM-2, which is larger than that of the Angara-1.2.
- RD-0124MS New Russian rocket engine with a thrust of 60 tons (588 kN), powered by naphthyl–liquid oxygen propellants. The engine consists of two blocks located on a common frame, and a heat shield. Each block consists of two diagonally located combustion chambers. The engine provides steering of the chambers in two planes, and is as well able to work when one of the blocks is turned off. Development was in progress as of 2020 to power second stage of Soyuz-5 rocket.

== See also ==
- RD-0110 — previous engine.
- Soyuz 2.1b — first launch vehicle to use it.
- Soyuz 2.1v — second launch vehicle to use it.
- Angara — third launch vehicle to use it.
- Comparison of orbital rocket engines
