= RD-170 =

Soviet (now Russian) rocket engine, the most powerful in the world

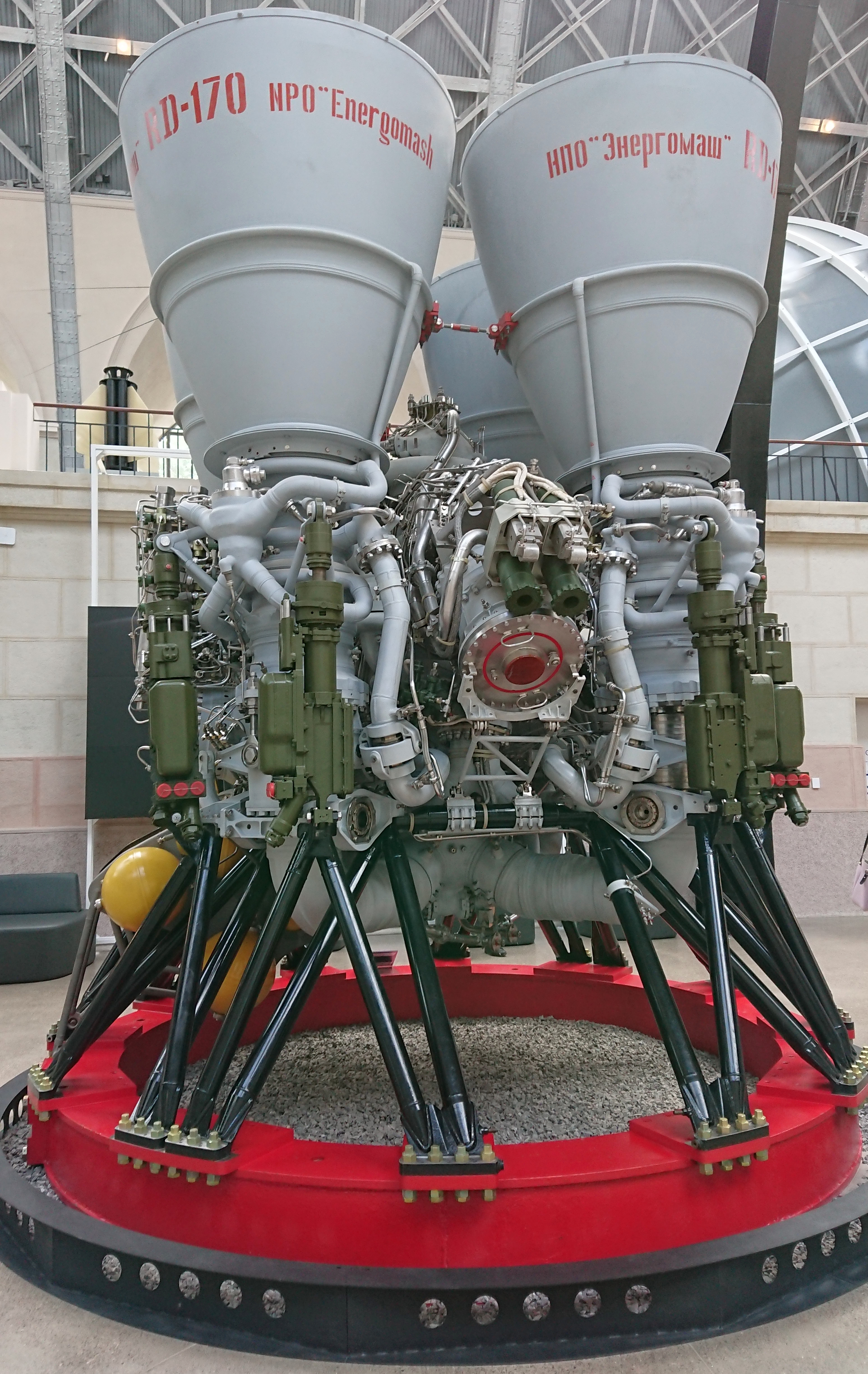
- Model of an RD-170 rocket engine, shown upside down
- Country of origin: Soviet Union
- First flight: 13 April 1985
- Last flight: 15 November 1988
- Designer: NPO Energomash
- Manufacturer: NPO Energomash
- Application: Main engine
- Associated LV: Energia
- Successor: RD-180 · RD-191
- Status: Retired

Liquid-fuel engine
- Propellant: LOX / RG-1
- Mixture ratio: 2.63
- Cycle: Oxidizer-rich staged combustion

Configuration
- Chamber: 4
- Nozzle ratio: 36.87

Performance
- Thrust, vacuum: 7,900 kN (1,800,000 lb_{f})
- Thrust, sea-level: 7,250 kN (1,630,000 lb_{f})
- Throttle range: 40–100%
- Thrust-to-weight ratio: 82:1
- Chamber pressure: 24.52 MPa (3,556 psi)
- Specific impulse, vacuum: 337 s (3.30 km/s)
- Specific impulse, sea-level: 309 s (3.03 km/s)
- Burn time: 150 seconds
- Gimbal range: 8°

Dimensions
- Length: 4 m (13 ft)
- Diameter: 3.8 m (12 ft)
- Dry mass: 9,750 kg (21,500 lb)

The RD-170 (Russian: Ракетный Двигатель-170 (РД-170), romanized: Raketnyy Dvigatel-170, lit. 'Rocket Engine-170') is the world's most powerful and heaviest liquid-fuel rocket engine. It was designed and produced in the Soviet Union by NPO Energomash for use with the Energia launch vehicle. The engine burns RG-1 fuel and LOX oxidizer in four combustion chambers, all supplied by one single-shaft, single-turbine turbopump rated at 170 MW (230,000 hp) in an oxidizer-rich stage combustion cycle.

== Shared turbopump ==
Several Soviet and Russian rocket engines use the approach of clustering small combustion chambers around a single turbine and pump. During the early 1950s, many Soviet engine designers, including Valentin P. Glushko, faced problems of combustion instability while designing bigger thrust chambers. At that time, they solved the problem by using a cluster of smaller thrust chambers.

== Variants ==
=== RD-170 ===
The RD-170 engine featured four combustion chambers and was developed for use on the Energia launch vehicle – both the engine and the launch vehicle were in production only for a short time. Energia was launched twice. Each Energia vehicle had 4 boosters, each powered by one RD-170.

The engine was designed to be reused up to 10 times, with a total service life of 20 full burn durations.

=== RD-171 ===
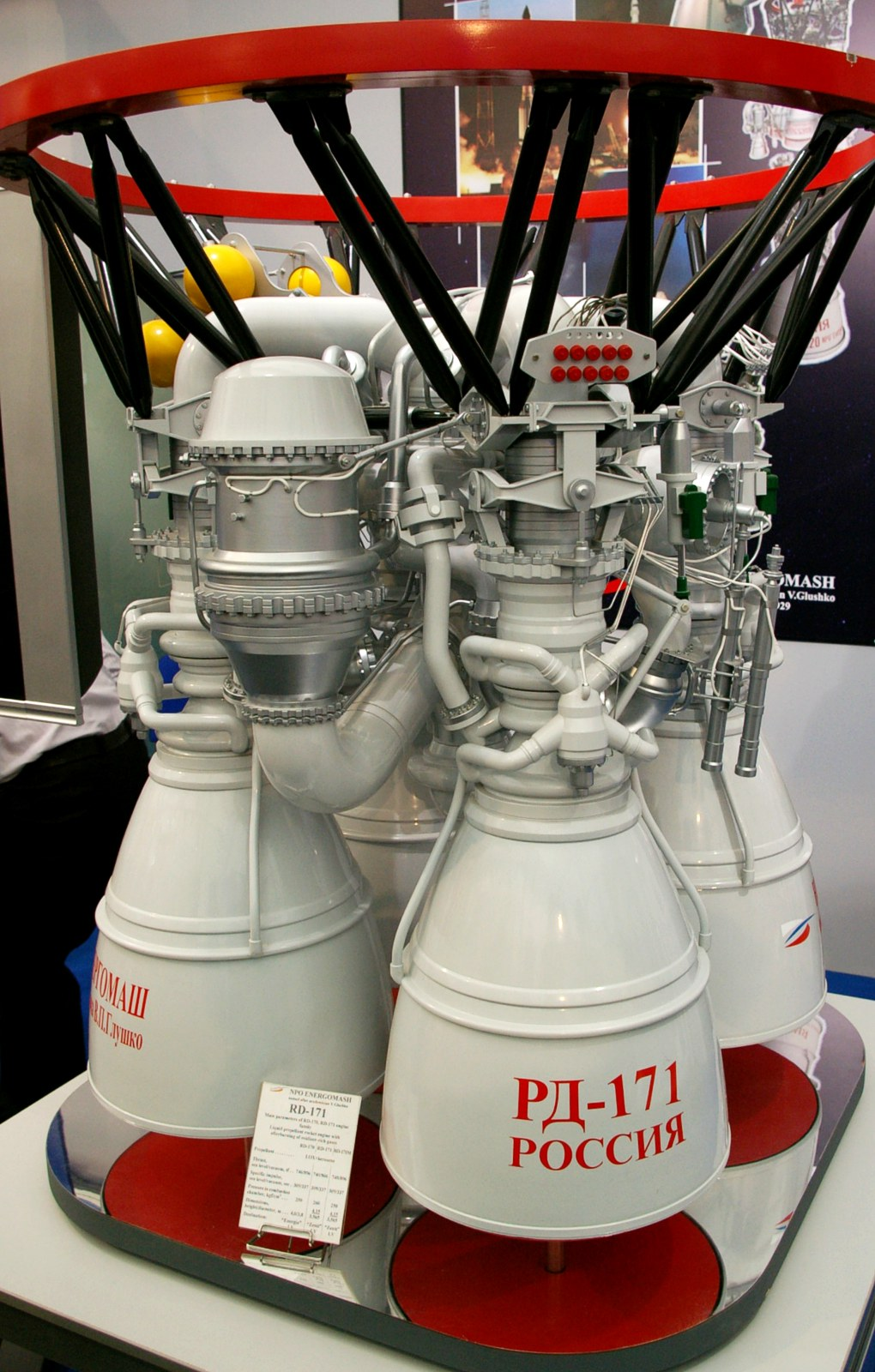
RD-171 model

Building on the technology from the Energia's liquid fuel booster the Zenit was developed, which uses a RD-170 variant, the RD-171. While the RD-170 had nozzles which swiveled on two axes, the RD-171's nozzles only swivel on one axis. Models called the RD-172 and RD-173 were proposed, upgrades that would provide additional thrust, and the RD-173 proposal was finalized as the RD-171M upgrade in 2006.

=== RD-171MV ===
A modification of RD-171M used on the Irtysh rocket. Unlike RD-171M it only uses Russian components and features a new control system. First test sample was manufactured in early 2019. Tests were reported to have been successfully completed in September 2021. The engine first launched in April 2026, with the first launch of the Soyuz 5 rocket.

=== Dual-chamber derivative ===
The RD-180 uses only two combustion chambers instead of the four of the RD-170. The RD-180 used on the Atlas V replaced the three engines used on early Atlas rockets with a single engine and achieved significant payload and performance gains. This engine had also been chosen to be the main propulsion system for the first stage of the now cancelled Russian Rus-M rocket.

=== Single-chamber derivative ===
The RD-191 is a single-chamber version used in the Russian Angara rocket. Variants of RD-191 include RD-151 in South Korean Naro-1 rocket, RD-181 in American Orbital ATK Antares rocket, and the proposed RD-193 for the Soyuz-2-1v project.

=== Proposed variants ===
On 28 July 2011, NPO Energomash summarised the results of the work on Rus-M rocket engine and considered the possibility of construction several new variants of RD-170 family engines. According to the information, new and proposed variants will be marked as:

- RD-180M for crewed Atlas V rocket (Not required, current RD-180 meets crewed Atlas V requirements.)
- RD-180V for Rus-M rocket.
- RD-175 with 9800 kN thrust for proposed Energia-K rocket.

In 2017, Director General of RKK Energia Vladimir Solntsev referred to a "simplified" and "cheaper" version of the RD-171 engine in connection with the Soyuz-5 (Sunkar) project.

== Specifications ==
- 4 combustion chambers, 4 nozzles
- 1 set of turbines and pumps; turbine produces approximately 257,000 hp (192 MW); equivalent to the power output of 3 nuclear-powered icebreakers
- Ignition: pyrophoric start-up fuel capsule (triethylaluminium)
- Vacuum thrust: 7,887 kN (1,773,000 lb_{f})
- Vacuum I_{sp}: 338 s (3.31 km/s)
- Sea-level I_{sp}: 309 s (3.03 km/s)
- Weight: 9,750 kilograms (21,500 lb)
- Thrust-to-weight ratio: 82

== See also ==
- Comparison of orbital rocket engines
