= RD-191 =

Russian rocket engine

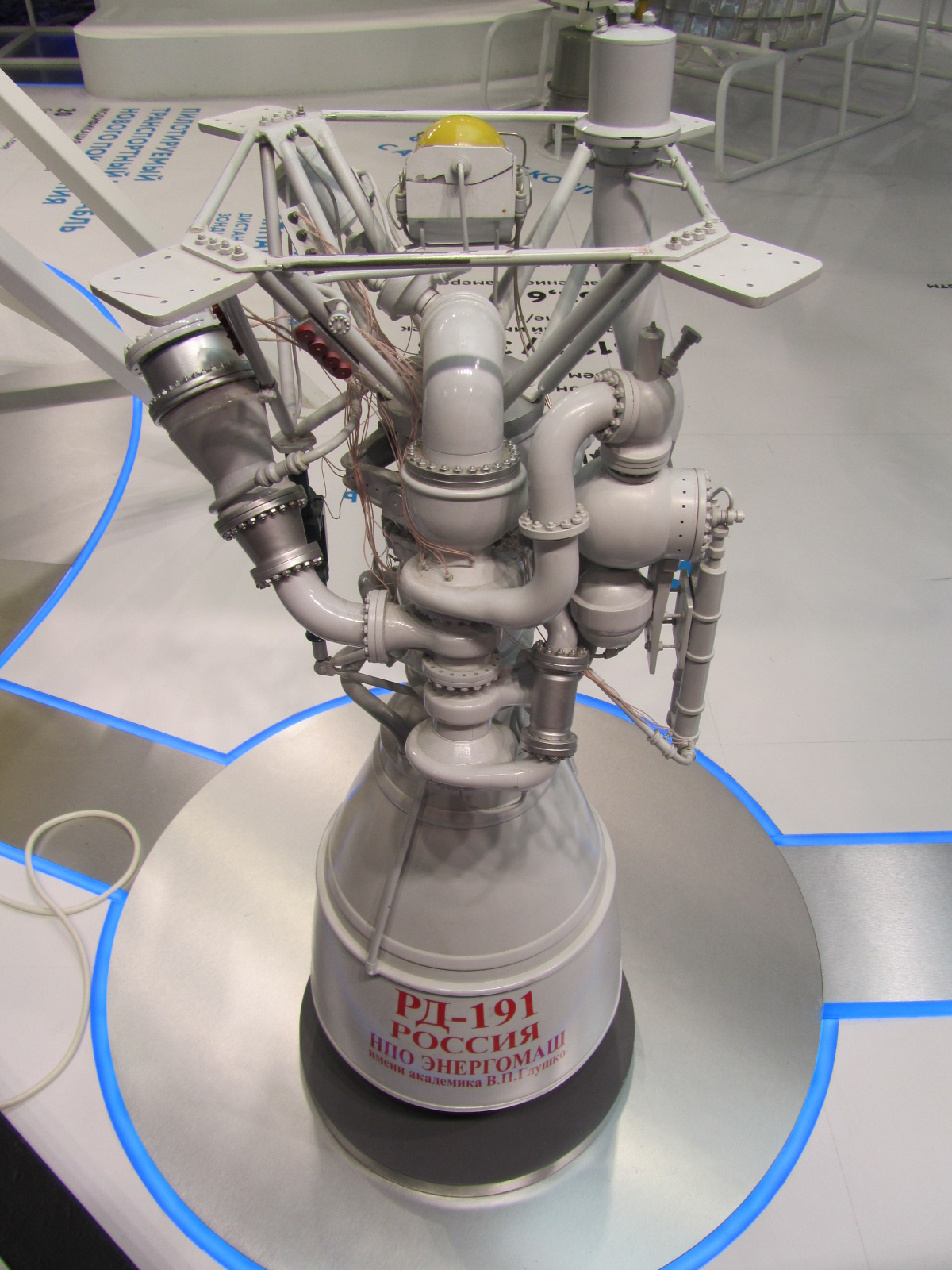
- Country of origin: Russia
- Date: 2001
- Designer: NPO Energomash
- Manufacturer: NPO Energomash / Proton-PM (in transition)
- Application: Main engine
- Predecessor: RD-170
- Status: In use

Liquid-fuel engine
- Propellant: LOX / RP-1
- Mixture ratio: 2.6:1
- Cycle: Oxidizer-rich staged combustion

Configuration
- Nozzle ratio: 37:1

Performance
- Thrust, vacuum: 2,090 kN (470,000 lb_{f}) at 100% throttle
- Thrust, sea-level: 1,920 kN (430,000 lb_{f}) at 100% throttle
- Throttle range: 27–105%
- Thrust-to-weight ratio: 89:1
- Chamber pressure: 25.8 MPa (3,740 psi)
- Specific impulse, vacuum: 337 s (3.30 km/s)
- Specific impulse, sea-level: 310.7 s (3.047 km/s)
- Burn time: 325 seconds (Angara A5 core stage)
- Gimbal range: 8°

Dimensions
- Length: 4 m (13 ft)
- Diameter: 1.45 m (4 ft 9 in)
- Dry mass: 2,290 kg (5,050 lb)

The RD-191 (Russian: Ракетный Двигатель-191, romanized: Raketnyy Dvigatel-191, lit. 'Rocket Engine 191') is a high-performance single-combustion chamber rocket engine, developed in Russia and sold by Roscosmos. It is derived from the RD-180 dual-combustion chamber engine, which itself was derived in turn from the four-chamber RD-170 originally used in the Energia launcher.

The RD-191 is fueled by a kerosene / LOX mixture and uses an oxygen-rich staged combustion cycle. In the future the engine is expected to become a workhorse in the Russian space sector, as older launch vehicles are phased out of production and service.

== Design ==
Burn ignition is provided chemically, by feeding a starter fluid into the combustion chamber and gas generator, which is self-igniting on contact with liquid oxygen. The engine is capable of throttling down to 30% of nominal thrust; the design also allows for a short-duration enhanced thrust (up to 105% of nominal level) in emergency situations. A Cardan suspension provides for yaw and pitch controls by gimballed thrust deflection up to 8 degrees.

A modern design, the engine incorporates sensors monitoring burn conditions. The measurements are used for telemetry and an emergency protection system.

The engine's powerhead fulfills two additional functions, heating helium gas for pressurization of propellant tanks and generating hydraulic power for hydraulic actuators to deflect the nozzle and aerodynamic rudders.

== Development ==
On 5 September 2008, the creator of the engine, NPO Energomash, stated that the engine had completed the full cycle of development and burn tests and is ready for manufacturing and delivery. The primary launch vehicle utilizing this engine is the Angara carrier rocket family, first flown in 2014.

By 2010, the engine had passed all development phases, and its nine prototypes had accumulated over 23,000 seconds in 105 firing tests, with one of them reaching the maximum running time of 3,635 seconds in 12 tests. In July 2014, the engine made its maiden flight, propelling the Angara 1.2pp test vehicle on a suborbital flight. In December 2014, the engine flew again, powering the Angara A5 heavy carrier rocket. In the same month, Orbital Sciences announced it would purchase RD-181 engines, a variant of the RD-191, for use on the Antares rocket.

== Variants ==
=== RD-151 ===
A version of the RD-191 with thrust reduced to 170 tonnes, called RD-151, was fire-tested on 30 July 2009. The first flight test of this engine was conducted on 25 August 2009 as part of the first launch of South Korean Naro-1 rocket.

=== RD-181 ===
The RD-181 is based on the RD-191 and is adapted for integration on the Antares rocket. While the RD-193 was designed as a close replacement for the NK-33, on 17 December 2014, Orbital Sciences announced that it would use the NPO Energomash RD-181 on the version 2 Antares launch vehicle and had contracted directly with NPO Energomash for up to 20 RD-181 engines. Two engines are used on the first stage of each 200-series Antares, which is currently used to carry cargo to the International Space Station under contract to NASA. While Russian press had stated that the contract was valued at US$ 1 billion with options, Orbital stated on 26 January 2015 that even when exercising all the options the contract was less than that amount, and that the initial contractual commitment was significantly less than that. On 19 February 2015, Orbital ATK said that its revamped Antares rocket featuring a new main engine would make its first launch in March 2016. On 29 May 2015, Orbital stated that the new engines had successfully conducted seven certification firings and all went as expected. It also stated that the first two flight models were doing final tests and would be delivered to Orbital in early July.

The two RD-181s have 440 kilonewtons (100,000 lbf) more thrust than the paired AJ-26 engines used on the first-generation Antares. Northrop Grumman Innovation Systems (formerly Orbital) modified the core stage to accommodate the increased performance, and then to finish up its CRS-1 cargo contract commitment to NASA for delivering a total of 20,000 kg (44,000 lb) of cargo in only four additional flights, rather than the five more that would have been required with the AJ-26/Antares combination. The AJ-26 engines were refurbished NK-33 rocket engines built for the N1F rocket, which was intended for use in the Soviet moonshot prior to its cancellation.

For the Antares 230+ upgrades, debuted with the CRS-2 Cygnus NG-12 mission, heat exchangers were removed from the RD-181 engine.

In 2022, Russia suspended engine deliveries to the United States as a result of the Russian invasion of Ukraine, and Northrop Grumman cancelled the remainder of the contract in favor of moving away from the RD-181. Instead, Antares 330 will use an engine designed by Firefly Aerospace, the Miranda.

=== RD-193 ===
In April 2013, it was announced that a further derivation, the RD-193, had completed testing. This version is lighter and shorter, designed for use on the light-launcher Soyuz-2.1v when the inventory of surplus NK-33 engines is exhausted.

=== RD-191M ===
During the 2010s, NPO Energomash was working on the RD-191M engine, which was intended for the Angara-A5M and Angara-A5V rockets. The engine was test-fired in 2016, reaching 110 percent above the thrust of the original variant, the company's officials said. In May 2024, Roskosmos said that a full cycle of autonomous tests of components for the RD-191M engine had been completed at NPO Energomash by the end of 2023 and on July 8, 2024, NPO Energomash announced that it had completed tune-up tests of RD-191M. According to the company, the first RD-191M engine for tune-up tests had been manufactured at the end of 2023.

Russia has also offered a transfer of technology to India for The RD-191M engine. use on uprated variants of the LVM-3 launch vehicle. This procurement is expected to replace the L110 stage on the LVM3 rocket prior to the induction of the SCE-200 in the future iterations.

== See also ==
- Comparison of orbital rocket engines
