= RD-0169 =

Russian oxygen-methane rocket engine

The RD-0169 (Russian: Ракетный Двигатель-0169, romanized: Raketnyy Dvigatel-0169, lit. 'Rocket Engine 0169') is a Russian oxygen-methane fueled rocket engine being developed by KBKhA. Liquefied natural gas (methane) is used as fuel, while liquid oxygen is used as an oxidizer. Designed for use in reusable launch vehicles (like Soyuz-7).

The advantages of the configuration are: ease of use, environmental friendliness, and the possibility of reusable use. It was planned to achieve a thrust of 200 tons. In the standard version, the pressure in the combustion chamber is planned at 175 kgf/cm2. It is being developed on the basis of RD-0162 with an intermediate and smaller version in the form of RD-0177; two modifications are known: RD-0169A (the engine of the first stage of the Soyuz-7) and RD-0169V (a four-chamber engine of the second stage of the Soyuz-7). The chief designer is Viktor Gorokhov.

== Development ==
In 1994, the Russian government Chemical Automatics Design Bureau (KBKhA) began conducting research on converting the RD-0120, RD-0124, RD-0234, RD-0242, RD-0256 engine series of designs to methane-oxygen propellants. In 1996-1999 design calculations, materials science and technological studies were carried out on a number of liquid-propellant rocket engines with a thrust of 5-240 tf. (RD-0139, RD-0140, RD-0134, RD-0141, RD-0142, RD-0143A, RD-0143K, RD-0144, RD-0149) using oxygen-methane fuel. The demonstration engines RD-0110MD, based on the RD-0110, and RD-0146M, were hot fire tested in ground facilities.

The RD-0162 rocket engine was developed at the Voronezh KBKhA after 2006, initially with an engine version aimed at 2,000 kN (200 tf) thrust, and later, after 2012, a smaller version with a thrust of 416 kN (42.4 tf) in the RD-0162SD version. Engine development funding was included in the Russian Federal Space Program for 2016–2025.

In 2012, according to the technical specifications from the Khrunichev Space Center, KBKhA developed a preliminary design of a liquid oxygen-methane engine RD-0162.

In December 2016, successful tests of the demonstrator engine RD-0162D2A took place.

At the end of October 2017, a series of fire tests of the RD-0162D2A engine, with a thrust of 40 tons took place; a preliminary design for an oxygen-methane engine with a thrust of 85 tons was subsequently developed. The next stage involves the specification of design documentation for an engine with a thrust of 85 tons, as well as continued preparation of production and the manufacture of power plants for testing individual engine systems.

On 26 September 2019, a contract was posted on the government procurement website for the creation of a methane engine by the Voronezh KBKhA with a targeted completion date of 15 November 2021. According to the technical specifications, the engine was named RD-0177, the thrust should be 85 tf, the sea level specific impulse should be 312 s, and the mass should not exceed 2200 kg.

On 27 August 2020, Igor Arbuzov, General Director of NPO Energomash, told the media that individual elements of the units of the future methane engine had now been tested - a gas generator, a mixing head. Now the company is moving on to work directly on the production of the RD-0177 demonstrator engine, which they aim to manufacture in 2022.

On 24 December 2021, at the testing complex of the Voronezh Rocket Engine Center, hot fire tests of the standard autonomous ignition system of the reusable oxygen-methane rocket engine RD-0177 were successfully carried out. According to the chief designer of the KBHA, Viktor Gorokhov, the planned test program was exceeded: within one test day, rather than five starts, eight were carried out, during which they confirmed the operability and plausibility of reusable use of the engine ignition system for future use as part of the return stages of launch vehicles.

== See also ==
- BE-4
- SpaceX Raptor
- TQ-12
