= Baikonur Cosmodrome Site 90 =

Site 90
- Launch site: Baikonur Cosmodrome
- Operator: RVSN; VKS; VKO
- Total launches: 123
- Launch pad(s): Two
Site 90/19 launch history
- Status: Inactive
- Known launches: 22
- First launch: 5 November 1963; UR-200
- Last launch: 9 December 1997; Tsyklon-2 / Kosmos 2347
- Associated rockets: UR-200; Tsyklon-2A; Tsyklon-2
Site 90/20 launch history
- Status: Active
- Known launches: 27
- First launch: 24 September 1964; UR-200
- Last launch: 25 June 2006; Tsyklon-2 / Kosmos 2421
- Associated rockets: UR-200; Tsyklon-2A; Tsyklon-2

Site 90 at the Baikonur Cosmodrome is a launch complex consisting of two pads, which has been used by UR-200, Tsyklon-2A and Tsyklon-2 rockets. Built in the 1960s for the UR-200, which was first launched from the complex on 3 November 1963, it was converted for use by Tsyklon rockets after further development of the UR-200 was cancelled. One pad is currently active, pending the final Tsyklon-2 launch which is expected to occur in 2012.

The two pads at the site are 90/19, which was the first to be used, and 90/20, which saw its first launch in September 1964. The last launch from Site 90/19 occurred on 9 December 1997, whilst 90/20 remains operational, its most recent launch having occurred in June 2006. In total, the complex has been used for 123 launches as of March 2012. These launches consisted of nine UR-200, eight Tsyklon-2A, and 106 Tsyklon-2 rockets. There is no data on which of the two pads was used for 74 of the Tsyklon-2 launches known to have originated from the complex, however it is known that twenty two launches, including six UR-200s and five Tsyklon-2As, occurred from Site 90/19, and 27 launches, including three UR-200s and three Tsyklon-2As, occurred from pad 90/20.
