= Soyuz-7 =

Proposed reusable Russian rocket design

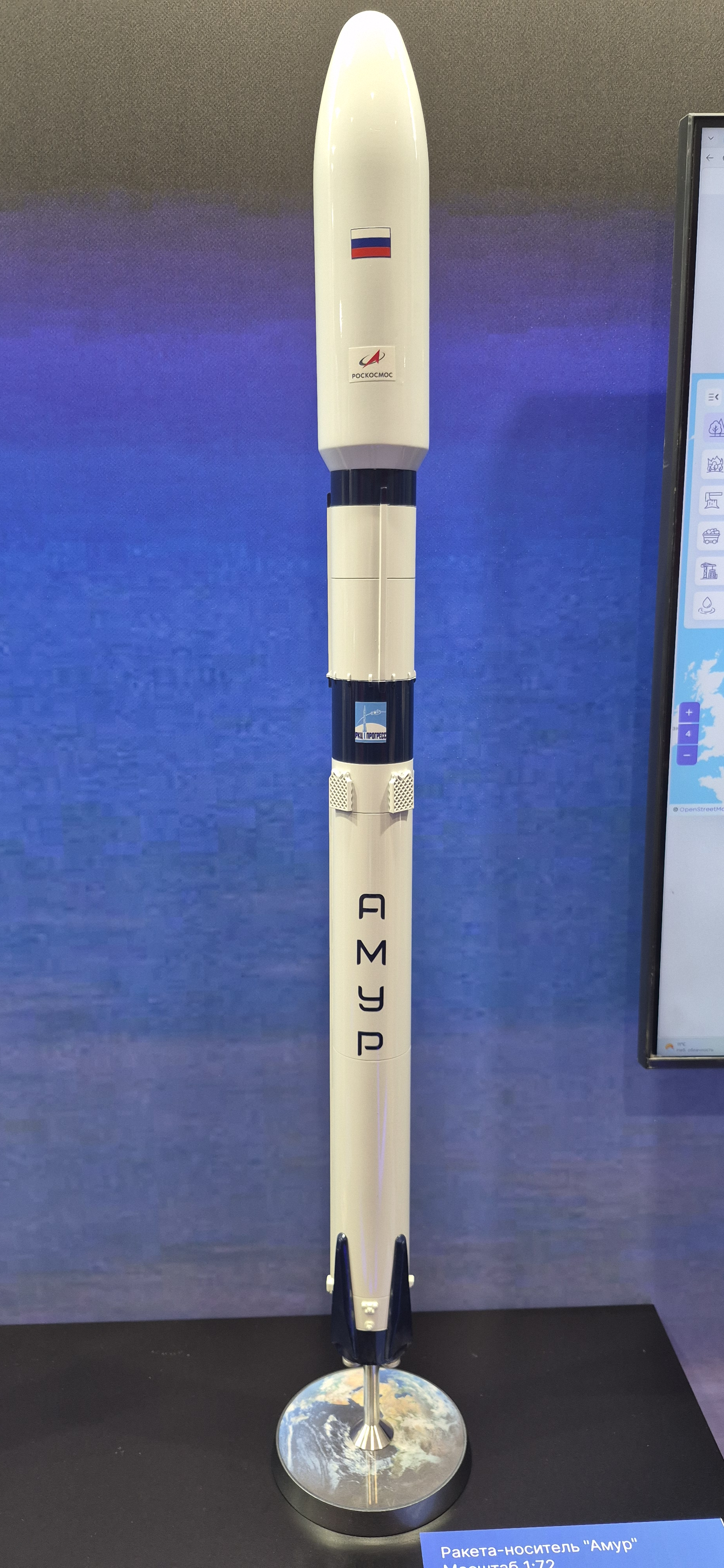
- Amur rocket model at ISF 2026
- Function: Partially reusable orbital medium-lift launch vehicle
- Manufacturer: JSC SRC Progress; KB Khimavtomatika
- Country of origin: Russia
- Project cost: US$900 million
- Cost per launch: US$22 million (planned)

Size
- Height: 55 m (180 ft)
- Diameter: 4.1 m (13 ft)
- Mass: 360,000 kg (790,000 lb)
- Stages: 2

Capacity

Payload to LEO
- Mass: Reusable: 10,500 kg (23,100 lb); Expendable: 13,600 kg (30,000 lb)

Associated rockets
- Comparable: Soyuz-2 (rocket)

Launch history
- Status: In development
- Launch sites: Vostochny Cosmodrome
- First flight: 2028–2030 (planned)

First stage
- Diameter: 4.1 m (13 ft)
- Powered by: 5 RD-0169
- Maximum thrust: 4,900 kN (1,100,000 lb_{f})
- Specific impulse: Sea Level: 321 seconds Vacuum: 356 seconds
- Propellant: CH_{4} / LOX

Second stage
- Diameter: 4.1 m (13 ft)
- Powered by: RD-0169
- Maximum thrust: 737 kN (166,000 lb_{f})
- Propellant: CH_{4} / LOX

The Soyuz-7 (Russian: Союз-7) or Amur (Russian: Аму́р) is a partially-reusable, methane–fueled, orbital launch vehicle currently in the design concept stage of development by the Roscosmos State Corporation in Russia. The preliminary design process began in October 2020, with operational flights planned for no earlier than 2030. Amur is intended to replace the existing Soyuz-2 at a much lower per launch cost.

JSC SRC Progress originally proposed this new family of Russian rockets in the mid-2010s to replace the legacy Soyuz in the early 2020s. JSC SRC Progress had been the manufacturer and custodian of the Soyuz family design for many decades. The new design concept was a part of Project Feniks (Russian: Феникс, lit. 'Fenix'). While all previous iterations of the Soyuz family had their roots firmly set on the R-7 ICBM legacy, the new rocket, designated Soyuz-7 in 2013, was to be a completely new design from the ground up. The proposed new design was to be based on a new propellant: LOX and liquid methane, use a new tank structure, new propulsion, and would do away with the famous Korolev Cross, and have thrust vector control in the main engine rather than using vernier engines. It was conceived in 2013 to be a scalable family with three versions covering the medium to heavy payload ranges.

The project would help to assure access to space for Russia by acting as a backup launcher in the event of problems with the Angara rocket family.

As conceived in the mid-2010s, the smallest version was to be a 270-tonne rocket, intended as a replacement of the Soyuz-2 rocket, with an expected payload to LEO of 9 t (9,000 kg). It will use a single RD-0164 engine on the first stage, and a RD-0169 engine on the second. The first engineering design was expected to be completed by 2016, and the first flight expected as early as 2022. The use of just two stages for the base version, and the simplification of subsystems was intended to produce a more reliable and less-expensive launch vehicle, with the lightest version expected to be cheaper than the Soyuz-2.

== History ==
=== Background ===
==== 2013 ====
During an interview with the Kazakhstani magazine Space Research and Technologies during 2013, Mr. Kirilin, CEO of TSKB Progress, explained the conception of the project. When the Rus-M project was cancelled, TSKB Progress started work sometime prior to mid-2015 on a methane fueled launch vehicle under the Roscosmos Magistral research program.

The Soyuz rocket vehicle would be an approximately 60-year-old design by 2020 and it could not remain competitive with the new vehicles, like the Falcon 9. It was described by Progress CEO, Mr. Kirilin, as technologically and operationally hopelessly outdated. It has conical sections, where each panel is unique, it uses six engines with 24 nozzles. Looking forward, the price of RG-1 fuel was going up, since it could only be distilled from a single oil field, that by 2015 was expected to be depleted soon.

The proposed Soyuz-7 was, unlike previous Soyuz rockets, planned to use the same diameter for all sections of the rocket, 3.6 m (12 ft), use liquid methane and liquid oxygen, have a single engine with a single nozzle on each stage, and automate most tasks. The proposed new rocket was conceived to use the existing Soyuz pads and installations after some modifications. Liquid methane is cheap, Russia has ample reserves and it has a huge installed base. It also has some important thermal and polymerizing properties that paves the way for reusable rockets. The rocket was expected to use the KBKhA RD-0164 engine in the core stages, and a methane version of the KBKhA RD-0124 in the upper stage.

==== 2015 ====
During an August, 2015 interview with Ria Novosti, Mr. Kirilin stated that a preliminary design was expected in 2015 or 2016, that they intended to first develop a light version, that they anticipated an initial test flight of the first prototype in 2022 and that the propulsion would be the RD-0164 for the cores and the RD-0169 rocket engine for the upper stage.

However, this project, part of Soyuz-5, was abandoned when Soyuz-5 evolved into a replacement for Zenit family named Irtysh, with RKK Energia as manufacturer. The methalox rocket was later renamed to Soyuz-7.

=== Amur unveiling 2020 ===
The design concept for a reusable Russian launch vehicle, referred to as Amur, was unveiled publicly in 2020. The design was shown to have a "reusable first stage and methane-fueled engines and land like the Falcon 9. The maiden launch was then planned for 2026.

The contract for the preliminary design phase of the Amur was signed on 5 October 2020, to build "the first Russian reusable methane rocket." The design reference goals included high-reliability, operational launch cost target of US$22 million, and a reusable first stage, with an expendable second stage. The 2020 Roscosmos budget had a "not to exceed" program cost of 70 billion rubles (US$880 million) for the development program through the first launch. As of 2020, the rocket design was expected to follow the practice of SpaceX with the Falcon 9 to design the first stage for reusability. and the rocket engine to be reused 100 or more times.

By November 2024, little progress had been made, with the debut having slipped four years, from 2026 to 2030.

=== Grasshopper prototype ===
In November 2024, Roscosmos official Igor Pshenichnikov, deputy director of future programs, revealed that they will look to develop a prototype Amur first stage called Grasshopper, and said that preparations for it would begin in 2025. Roscosmos has not yet located the site for where the launch pad will be located to test the experimental vehicle.

== Versions ==
=== Previous ===
In the mid-2010s, Soyuz-7 was initially conceived to be a scalable family, with three conceptual versions:

- Basic version, designed to replace the Soyuz-2.1a/b rockets, was to have used just a first and a second stage. It was conceived to have a payload to a 200 km (120 mi) circular LEO orbit of 9 t (8.9 long tons; 9.9 short tons).
- A three-core-stage version, designed as a crew carrier vehicle, that would use a central core and two equal cores on the side as boosters. This design concept was to have not an air-ignited second stage to eliminate air start risk. It was expected to have a payload to LEO of 16 t (16 long tons; 18 short tons).
- The heaviest version with maximum capability. It was expected to achieve a payload to LEO of 25 t (25 long tons; 28 short tons).

By 2020, Roscosmos had pivoted the Soyuz-7 concept to the Amur, with a new design for a reusable, methane-fueled rocket.

=== Description ===
In 2020, Amur is planned to be a 4.1 m (13 ft)-diameter two-stage-to-orbit, medium-lift vehicle of 55 m (180 ft) height, with a gross liftoff mass of 360 t (790,000 lb). It is aimed to deliver a payload to low Earth orbit of 10.5 t (23,000 lb), but could loft 12.5 t (28,000 lb) if the first stage is expended and not reused, as all traditional launch vehicles of the early space age were. Amur is planned to launch from the Vostochny Cosmodrome in the Russian Far East.

The first stage of the rocket will use grid fins to assist with attitude control during atmospheric reentry and is planned to be powered by five RD-0169A methalox engines, which, as of 2020, were under development at the Chemical Automatics Design Bureau. The long-term target is for most of the engines to fire 100 times, but the center engine, reignited for descent through the atmosphere and again for landing operations with landing legs, will be aimed to eventually reach a life expectancy of 300 engine firings.

As of 2020, the ground test program for the new methalox-propellant engines was expected to be completed by late 2024. However, as of November 2024, the maiden launch of Amur has been delayed to 2030.

== Launches ==
=== Future Launches ===
Serial number	Rocket & serial	Date (UTC)	Launch site	Payload	Orbit	Outcome	Remarks
1	Amur	NET 2030	Vostochny Cosmodrome Site 2A	GVM-M(Simulated mass)	LEO	TBD	First test flight of Amur

== Gallery ==
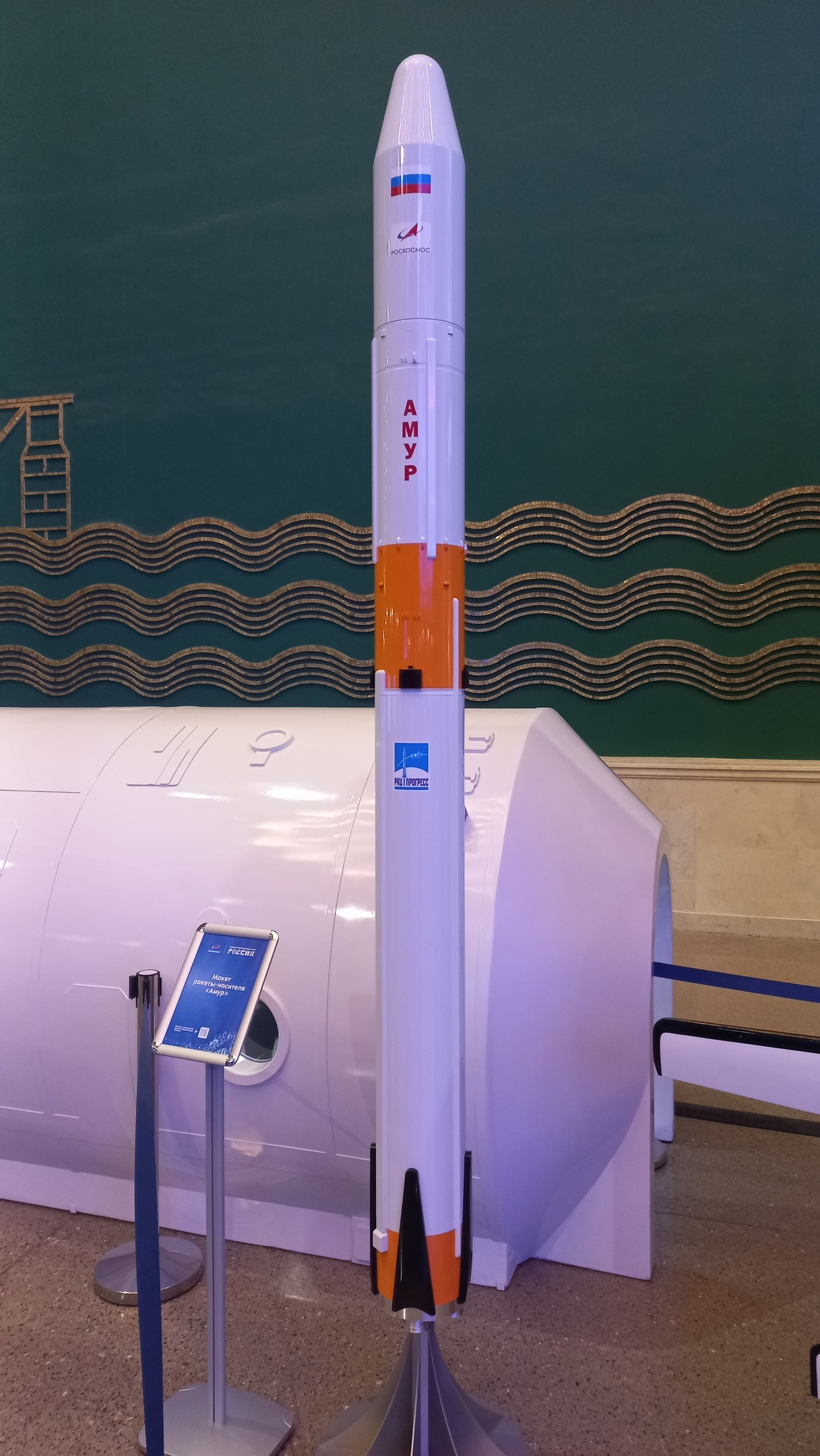
Amur at Russia exhibition in 2023

== See also ==
- Comparison of orbital launch systems
- Soyuz programme
- Soyuz rocket family
- Soyuz-5 rocket family – Russian heavy-lift rocket
- Angara – Russian family of space launch vehicles

=== Launch systems of comparable class and technology ===
(Reusable methane-fueled medium lift-off systems)

- LandSpace Zhuque-3
- Long March 12A
- i-Space Hyperbola-3
- Rocket Lab Neutron
