= RD-0214 =

Rocket vernier engine

RD-0207 (РД-0207) RD-0214 (РД-0214)
- Country of origin: Soviet Union; Russia
- First flight: RD-0207: 1963-11-06; RD-0214: 1967-03-10
- Designer: OKB-154, Yankel I. Guerchkovitch
- Manufacturer: Voronezh Mechanical Plant
- Application: Vernier thruster
- Status: In production

Liquid-fuel engine
- Propellant: N_{2}O_{4} / UDMH
- Mixture ratio: 2.54
- Cycle: Gas-generator

Configuration
- Chamber: 4

Performance
- Thrust, vacuum: 30.9 kN (6,900 lb_{f})
- Chamber pressure: 5.3 MPa (770 psi)
- Specific impulse, vacuum: RD-0207: 297 s (2.91 km/s); RD-0214: 293 s (2.87 km/s)
- Burn time: RD-0207: 133 seconds RD-0214: 270 seconds

Dimensions
- Length: 524 mm (20.6 in)
- Diameter: 3,780 mm (149 in)
- Dry mass: 90 kg (200 lb)

Used in
- Proton third stage

The RD-0214 (Russian: Ракетный Двигатель-0214 [РД-0214], romanized: Raketnyy Dvigatel-0214, lit. 'Rocket Engine 0214', GRAU index: 8D811) is a vernier thruster rocket engine burning unsymmetrical dimethylhydrazine (UDMH) fuel with dinitrogen tetroxide (N_{2}O_{4}) oxidizer in a gas-generator cycle. It has four nozzles that can each gimbal 45 degrees in plane to provide thrust vectoring control to the RD-0212 propulsion module of Proton rocket's third stage. It is a revised version of the RD-0207 (Russian: РД-0214, GRAU index: 8D67).

== Development ==
When Chelomey's OKB-52 started their UR-200 ICBM project, they requested S. A. Kosberg's OKB-154 to develop the propulsion. For the second stage, they used a single RD-0206, a variation of the first stage RD-0203, but required a vernier engine. To this end, the RD-0207 vernier engine was designed. It also included a heat exchanger to heat the pressurant gases for the second stage tank. While the UR-200 project was in direct competition to the R-36 and was cancelled in favor of the latter, it did have a few test launches and thus was a proven design.

Then Chelomey moved his proposals to the super heavy ICBM UR-500 (8K82) and later to the Proton-K (8K82K). A heavy launch vehicle that could perform important missions for the Soviet moonshot. For this new missions, it would not need to comply with ICBM specification standards, but would need at least a third stage. For the third stage, the UR-200 second stage was adapted—with the same 4.1 m tanking as the first and second stages and the RD-0205 module with an RD-0206 and an RD-0207 vernier engine was given an overhaul. The new module—known as RD-0212—consisted of an RD-0213 and an RD-0214 vernier engine. Many reliability enhancements were done and much extra test firings were performed. Yet, even as of 2015 design issues were found to have caused failures.

== History ==
The first launch test of the UR-200 was on November 5, 1963, and was unsuccessful. The second vehicle, launched on April 11, 1964, also failed. The final RD-0207 flight was on October 20, 1964.

The first RD-0214 flight was on October 3, 1967.

On September 15, 1968, the RD-0214 module launched the Zond 5 around the Moon on a free return trajectory, that sent the first alive organisms around the moon and back to Earth.

On 19 May 1971 a Proton launched the Mars 2 probe to Mars. The orbiter was identical to the Venera 9 bus, and the lander was the first man-made object to reach the surface of Mars.

On 8 June 1975 a Proton launched the Venera 9 to Venus. It consisted of an orbiter based on the Mars 2 design, and a lander that sent the first pictures from the surface of Venus.

== Versions ==
There are two basic versions of this engine:

- RD-0207 (GRAU Index: 8D67): A small gas generator rocket vernier engine using the same propellants as the RD-0206 and bundled with it in the RD-0205 propulsion module. It has four combustion chambers that can gimbal 45 degrees in a single plane and allow the UR-200 second stage to have vector control.
- RD-0214 (GRAU Index: 8D811): An evolution of the RD-0207 engine, used as vernier engine of the RD-0212 propulsion module along the RD-0213. It has four combustion chambers that can gimbal 45 degrees in a single plane and allow the Proton third stage to have vector control.

== Modules ==
These engines are actually bundled into modules. The relevant modules and auxiliary engines are:

- RD-0205 (GRAU Index: 8D46): A module comprising an RD-0206 and an RD-0207 vernier engine. Propulsion of the UR-200 second stage.
- RD-0212 (GRAU Index: 8D49): Also known as the RD-473, it is a propulsion module comprising one RD-0213 and an RD-0214 vernier engine. Propulsion module of the third stage of the Proton rockets.

== See also ==
- RD-0206 - Companion of the RD-0207.
- RD-0213 - Companion of the RD-0214.
- Proton - uses RD-0214.
- UR-200 - Used the RD-0207.
- KBKhA - The RD-0207 and RD-0214 design bureau.
- Voronezh Mechanical Plant - A space hardware manufacturing company that makes the RD-0214.
- Vernier Engine
- Rocket engine
