= Krylo-SV =

Krylo-SV is a Russian Roscosmos project to develop a reusable space launch vehicle.

== History ==
The conceptual design was approved in May 2019.

By mid 2023, drop tests of a technology demonstrator were planned for September 2023.

== Design ==
The first stage will deploy a wing and use a jet engine for recovery to allow reuse.

== See also ==
- Energia (rocket)
