= Voronezh Mechanical Plant =

Russian engine and heavy machinery manufacturing plant

- Native name: Воронежский механический завод
- Romanized name: Voronezh Mechanical Plant
- Formerly: Дизельный завод
- Company type: Unitary enterprise
- Industry: Liquid rocket engine manufacturing; Aircraft engine manufacturing; Train Diesel engines manufacturing; Oil and gas equipment manufacturing; Metallurgical production
- Founded: Voronezh, Russia (October 1, 1928)
- Headquarters: ул. Ворошилова, 22, Voronezh, Russia
- Key people: Sergey Viktorovich Kovalev
- Products: RD-0110; RD-0124 RD-0120 RD-0210 RD-0214
- Parent: Khrunichev State Research and Production Space Center
- Website: Official Website

Voronezh Mechanical Plant (Russian: Воронежский механический завод, ВМЗ) is a Russian engine and heavy machinery manufacturing plant. It is located in the city of Voronezh, in the Voronezh Oblast.

== History ==
Voronezh Mechanical Plant started as a diesel engine manufacturing plant, and has been the plant that serially manufactures the engines designed by Chemical Automatics Design Bureau (KBKhA). In later years, it has branched into producing oil and gas products like valves, manifolds and fittings.

In January 2017, Roscosmos announced that firing tests revealed problems with the Voronezh-produced Proton rocket upper stage engines. According to the investigation, expensive alloys had been replaced by cheaper less heat-resistant alloys. Voronezh director-general Ivan Tikhonovich Koptev resigned.

On November 1, 2019, enterprises ВМЗ and the Chemical Automatics Design Bureau were merged.

== Products ==
=== Current engines ===
Engines in production at the plant as of 2015:

- RD-0110 - Upper stage engine of the Soyuz-U, Soyuz-FG and Soyuz-2.1a
- RD-0110R - Vernier engine of the Soyuz-2.1v first stage.
- RD-0124 - Upper stage engine of the Soyuz-2.1b and Soyuz-2.1v.
- RD-0210 - Proton-M second stage engine.
- RD-0211 - Proton-M second stage engine.
- RD-0213 - Proton-M third stage engine.
- RD-0214 - Proton-M third stage vernier engine.

=== Former engines ===
Engines that are no longer produced at the plant.

- RD-0105 an RP-1/LOX upper stage engine that powered the Luna 8K72 Block-E and was the first engine to achieve escape velocity.
- RD-0107 - Upper stage engine of the Molniya.
- RD-0108 - Upper stage engine of the Voskhod. Human rated version of the RD-0107.
- RD-0109 - An RP-1/LOX upper stage engine that powered the Vostok-K Block-E that was used on launch of Vostok 1 to orbit making Yuri Gagarin the first human to go to outer space and the first to orbit the Earth.
- RD-0120 - An LH2/LOX sustainer engine that powered the Energia Core rocket engine. Roughly equivalent to the SSME.
- RD-0203 - The second staged combustion rocket in the world, and the first hypergolic. Used in first stage of UR-200
- RD-0204 - Slight variation of the RD-0204 with a heat exchanger. Also used in first stage of UR-200.
- RD-0206 - Second stage version of the RD-0203. Used in second stage of UR-200.
- RD-0207 - UR-200 second stage vernier engine.
- RD-0208 - Improved RD-0203. Used on the UR-500 second stage.
- RD-0209 - Improved RD-0204. Used on the UR-500 second stage.

== See also ==
- KBKhA – The rocket engine designer that delegates serial production to this plant.
- Khrunichev State Research and Production Space Center – The corporate parent of both KbKhA and this plant.
- United Rocket and Space Corporation – The government owned corporate entity that will encompass all aerospace corporations in Russia.
