= Soyuz (rocket family) =

Russian and Soviet rocket family

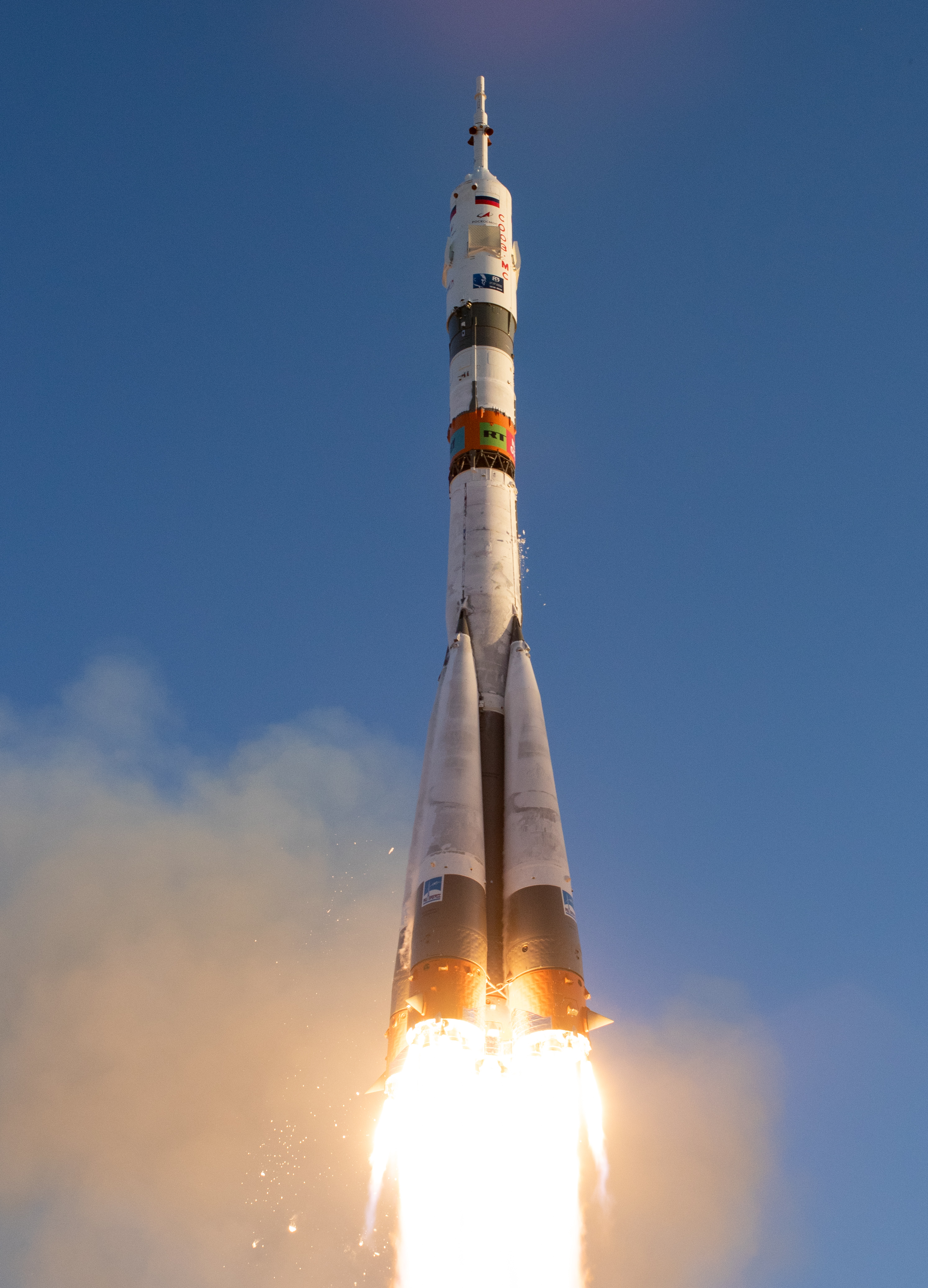
- A Soyuz-2.1a rocket carrying the Soyuz MS-29 spacecraft launches from Baikonur Cosmodrome, Kazakhstan on 14 July 2026.
- Function: Medium-lift launch vehicle
- Manufacturer: RKT Progress
- Country of origin: Soviet Union · Russia

Size
- Stages: 2-4

Associated rockets
- Family: R-7

Launch history
- Status: Active
- Launch sites: Baikonur, Sites 1/5, 31/6, and 45/1; Guiana, ELS; Plesetsk, Sites 16, 41 and 43; Vostochny, Site 1S
- First flight: 28 November 1966
- Carries passengers or cargo: Soyuz; Progress

Soyuz (Russian: Союз, lit. 'union', as in Soviet Union, GRAU index: 11A511) is a family of Soviet and later Russian expendable, medium-lift launch vehicles initially developed by the OKB-1 design bureau and has been manufactured by the Progress Rocket Space Centre in Samara, Russia. The Soyuz family holds the record for the most launches in the history of spaceflight. Most Soyuz rockets are part of the R-7 rocket family, which evolved from the R-7 Semyorka, the world's first intercontinental ballistic missile.

As with several Soviet launch vehicles, the names of recurring payloads became closely associated with the rocket itself. The Soyuz rocket became widely recognized as the launcher of crewed Soyuz spacecraft under the Soyuz programme, and of the derivative uncrewed Progress cargo spacecraft. Despite this recognition, the majority of Soyuz launches have been dedicated to deploying satellites for both governmental and commercial purposes.

All Soyuz variants use RP-1 (kerosene) and liquid oxygen (LOX) as propellants, with the exception of the Soyuz-U2, which used Syntin (a refined kerosene variant) with LOX.

Between the retirement of the Space Shuttle in 2011 and the first crewed flight of SpaceX's Crew Dragon in 2020, Soyuz rockets were the only certified launch vehicles capable of transporting astronauts to and from the ISS.

== History ==
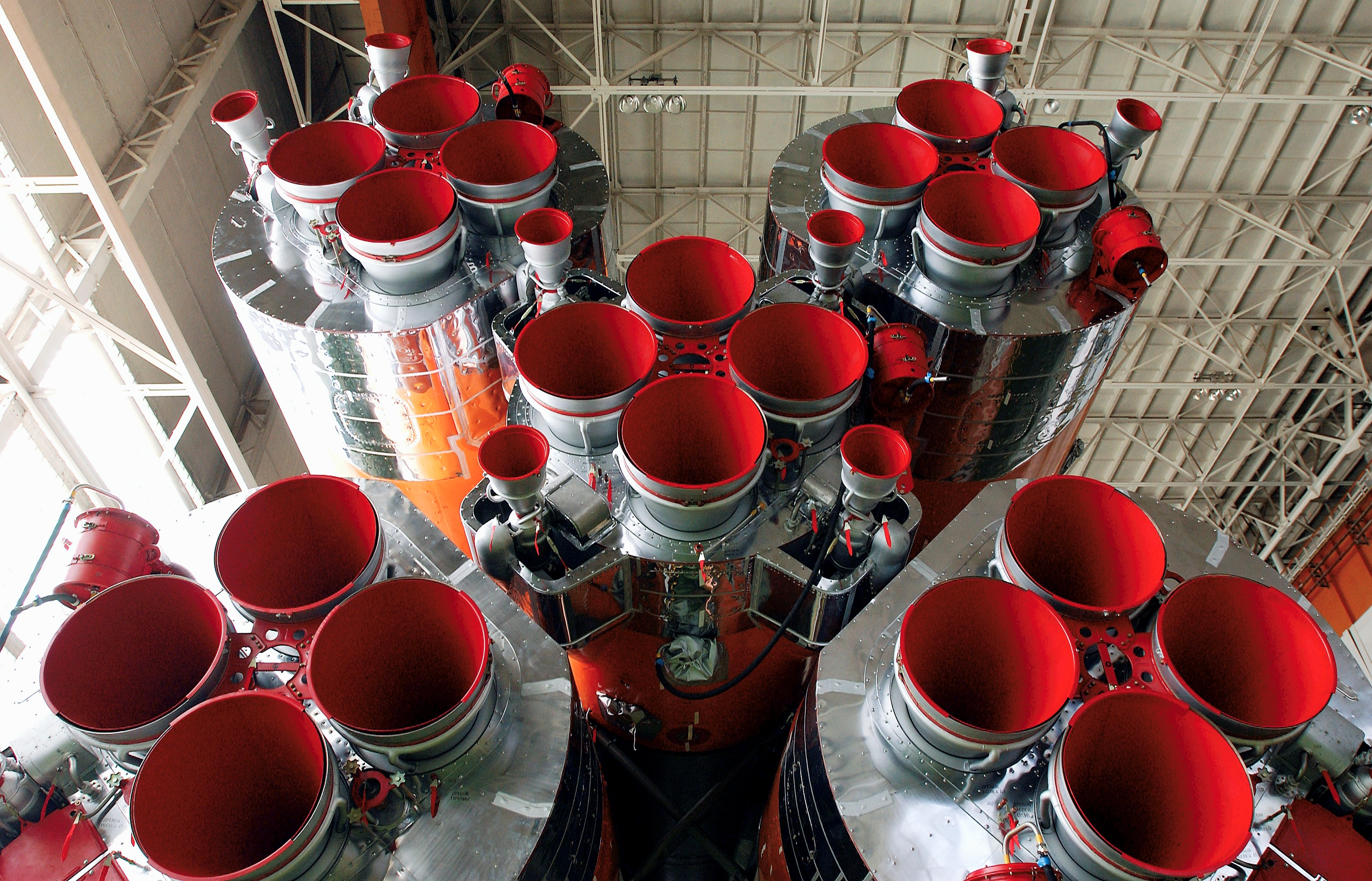
Soyuz rocket engines

=== Development ===
The first Soyuz launcher was introduced in 1966. It was derived from the earlier Vostok launcher, which in turn had been based on the R-7 Semyorka, the world's first intercontinental ballistic missile. The Soyuz used a three-stage design with the Block I third stage. Its first four test flights ended in failure, but subsequent missions achieved success.

A four-stage variant, the Molniya, was developed by adding an additional upper stage, enabling launches into highly elliptical Molniya orbits. A later evolution, the Soyuz-U, became the workhorse of the family.

During the Cold War, the exact Soviet model designations were not publicly available. In the West, the United States Department of Defense referred to the Soyuz launcher as SL-4, while Charles Sheldon of the Library of Congress devised the A-2 designation. Both systems were eventually abandoned as more accurate information became available.

Production of Soyuz rockets peaked at about 60 units per year in the early 1980s. By the 21st century, the Soyuz had become the world's most frequently used space launcher, with more than 1,700 flights. Despite its age, the family has remained in service due to its comparatively low cost, high reliability, and proven performance.

=== Soyuz / Fregat ===
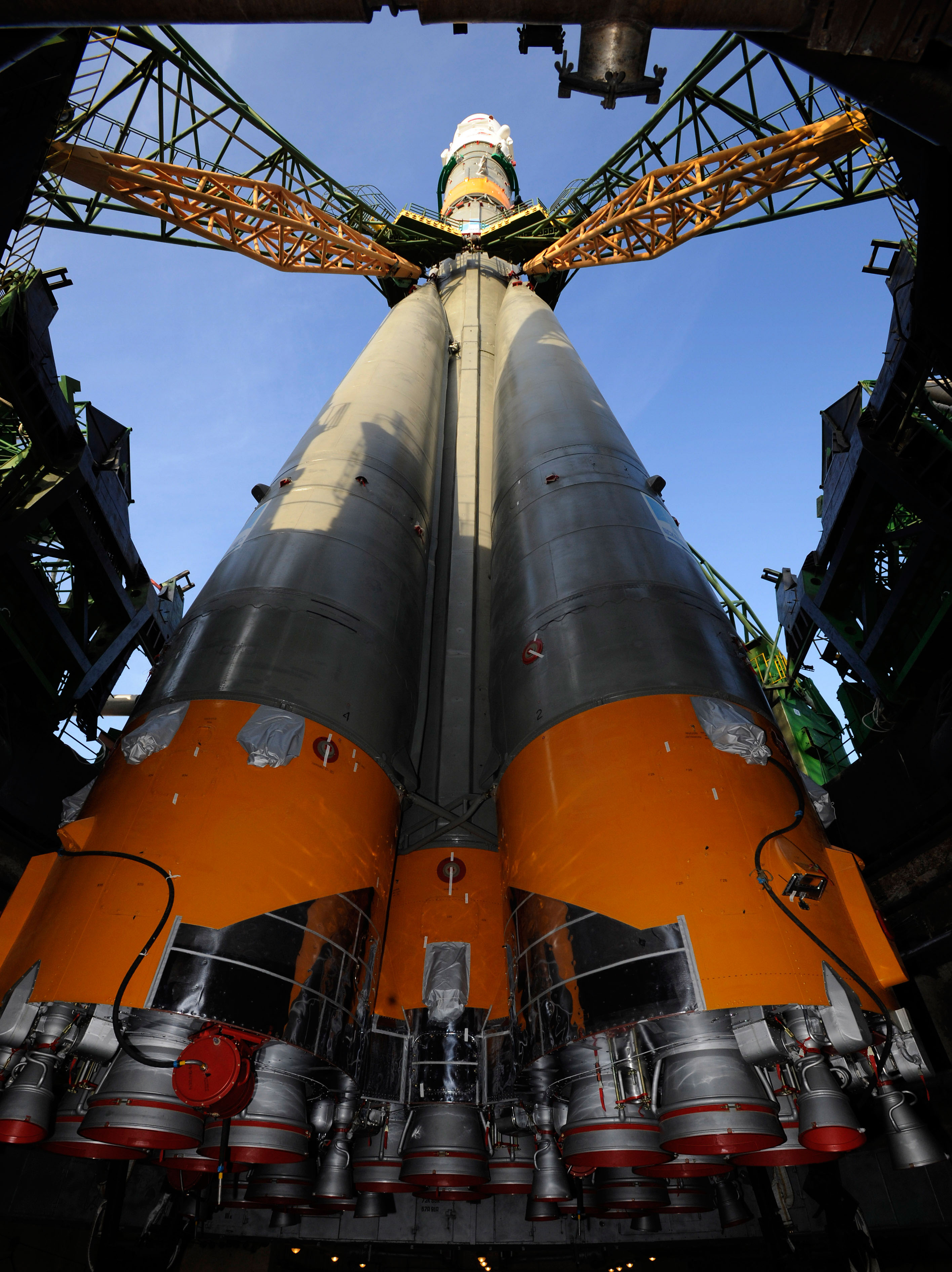
Soyuz-FG erected at the Baikonur Cosmodrome launch pad 1/5 (nicknamed Gagarin's Start) ahead of Soyuz TMA-13 in October 2008.

In the early 1990s plans were made for a redesigned Soyuz with a Fregat upper stage. The Fregat engine was developed by NPO Lavochkin from the propulsion module of its Phobos interplanetary probes. Although endorsed by Roscosmos and the Russian Ministry of Defence in 1993 and designated "Rus" as a Russification and modernization of Soyuz, and later renamed Soyuz-2, a funding shortage prevented implementation of the plan. The creation of Starsem in July 1996 provided new funding for the creation of a less ambitious variant, the Soyuz-Fregat or Soyuz-U/Fregat. This consisted of a slightly modified Soyuz-U combined with the Fregat upper stage, with a capacity of up to 1,350 kilograms (2,980 lb) to geostationary transfer orbit. In April 1997, Starsem obtained a contract from the European Space Agency (ESA) to launch two pairs of Cluster II plasma science satellites using the Soyuz-Fregat. Before the introduction of this new model, Starsem launched 24 satellites of the Globalstar constellation in 6 launches with a restartable Ikar upper stage, between 22 September 1999 and 22 November 1999. After successful test flights of Soyuz-Fregat on 9 February 2000 and 20 March 2000, the Cluster II satellites were launched on 16 July 2000 and 9 August 2000. Another Soyuz-Fregat launched the ESA's Mars Express probe from Baikonur in June 2003.

=== ISS crew transport ===
Between 1 February 2003 and 26 July 2005 with the grounding of the United States Space Shuttle fleet, Soyuz was the only means of transportation to and from the International Space Station. This included the transfer of supplies, via Progress spacecraft, and crew changeovers. After the retirement of the Space Shuttle fleet in 2011, the United States space program was without any means to take astronauts into orbit, and NASA was dependent on the Soyuz to send crew into space until 2020. NASA resumed crewed flights from the United States in 2020 through the Commercial Crew Development program.

=== Recent incidents ===
A long streak of successful Soyuz launches was broken on 15 October 2002 when the uncrewed Soyuz-U launch of the Photon-M satellite from Plesetsk fell back near the launch pad and exploded 29 seconds after lift-off. One person from the ground crew was killed and eight were injured.

Another failure occurred on 21 June 2005, during a Molniya military communications satellite launch from the Plesetsk launch site, which used a four-stage version of the rocket called Molniya-M. The flight ended six minutes after the launch because of a failure of the third stage engine or an unfulfilled order to separate the second and third stages. The rocket's second and third stages, which are identical to the Soyuz, and its payload (a Molniya-3K satellite) crashed in the Uvatsky region of Tyumen (Siberia).

On 24 August 2011, an uncrewed Soyuz-U carrying cargo to the International Space Station crashed, failing to reach orbit. On 23 December 2011, a Soyuz-2.1b launching a Meridian 5 military communications satellite failed in the 7th minute of launch because of an anomaly in the third stage.

On 11 October 2018, the Soyuz MS-10 mission to the International Space Station failed to reach orbit after an issue with the main booster. Four payload mounted solid rocket jettison motors were used to pull the Soyuz spacecraft away from the malfunctioning rocket, as the main launch abort system tower had been jettisoned.The two crew, Aleksey Ovchinin and Nick Hague, followed a ballistic trajectory and landed safely over 400 km downrange from the Baikonur Cosmodrome.

=== Soyuz 2 ===
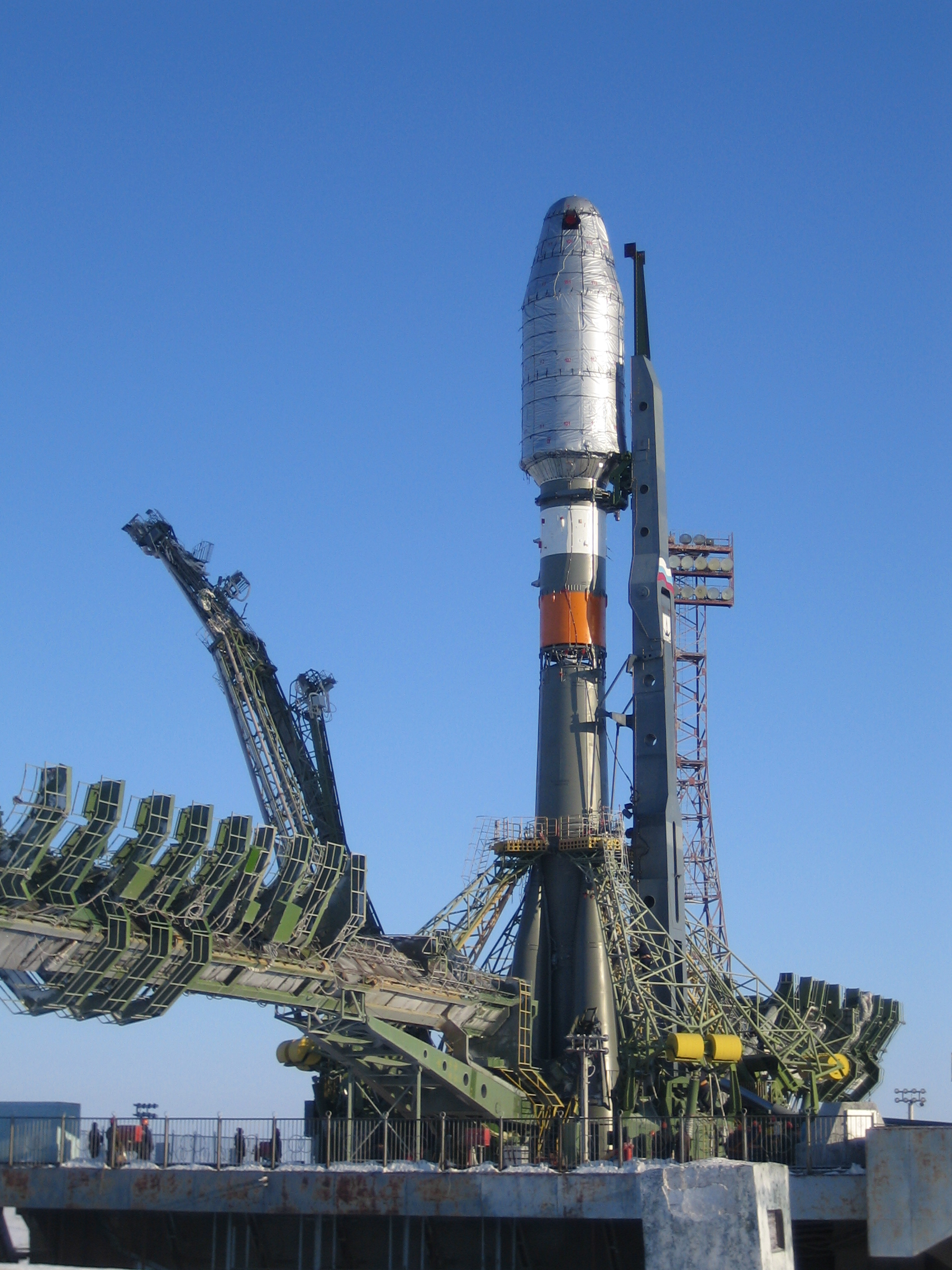
Soyuz 2 ready to launch (2007)

The venerable Soyuz-U launcher was gradually replaced by a new version, named Soyuz 2, which has a new digital guidance system and a highly modified third stage with a new engine. The first development version of Soyuz 2 called Soyuz 2.1a, which is equipped with the digital guidance system, but is still propelled by an old third stage engine, started on 4 November 2004 from Plesetsk on a suborbital test flight, followed by an orbital flight on 23 October 2006 from Baikonur. The fully modified launcher (version Soyuz 2.1b) flew first on 27 December 2006 with the CoRoT satellite from the Baikonur Cosmodrome.

On 19 January 2005, the European Space Agency (ESA) and Roscosmos agreed to launch Soyuz ST rockets from the Guiana Space Centre. The equatorial launch site allows the Soyuz to deliver 2.7 to 4.9 tonnes into Sun-synchronous orbit, depending on the third-stage engine used. Construction of a new pad started in 2005 and was completed in April 2011. The pad used vertical loading common at French Guiana, unlike the horizontal loading used at the Baikonur Cosmodrome. A simulated launch was conducted in early May 2011. The first operational launch happened on 21 October 2011, bearing the first two satellites in Galileo global positioning system.

The Soyuz-U and Soyuz-FG rockets were gradually replaced by Soyuz 2 from 2014 until 2019. Soyuz-U was retired in 2017, while Soyuz-FG carried astronaut crews to the ISS until September 2019 (final flight, Soyuz MS-15, on 25 September 2019).

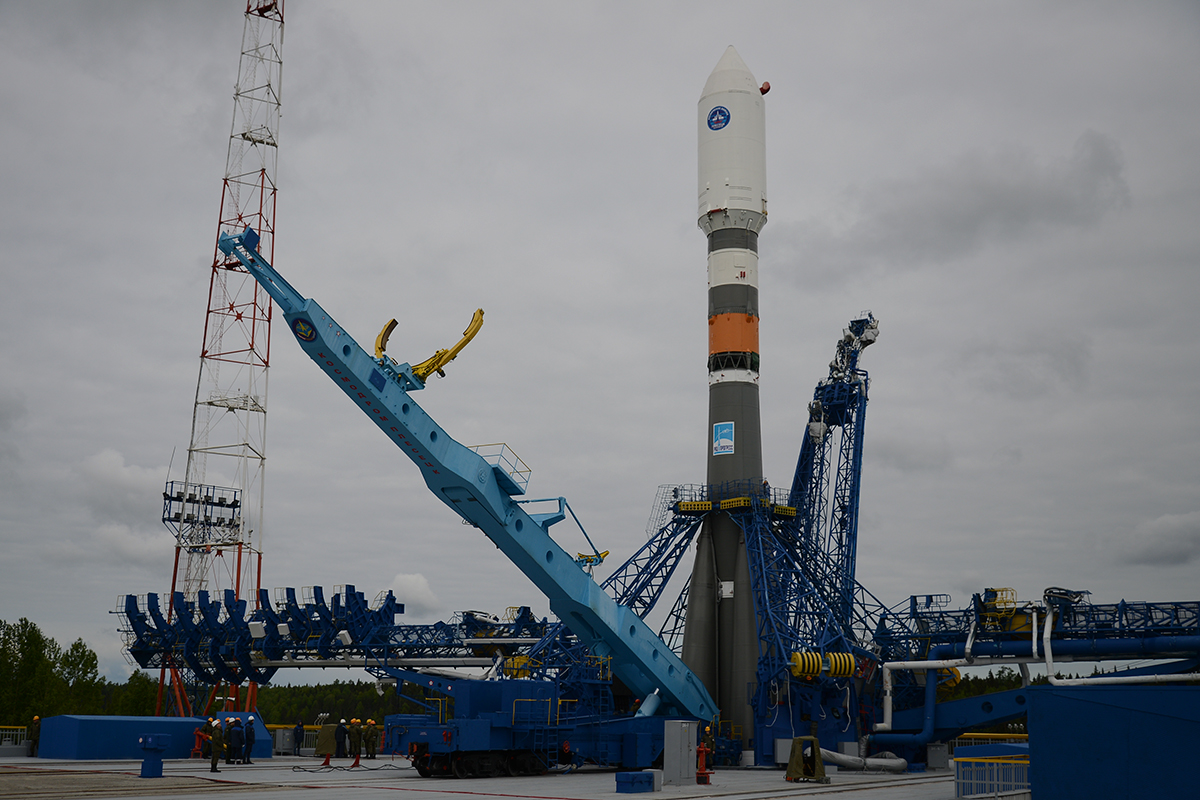
Soyuz-2.1b (2018)

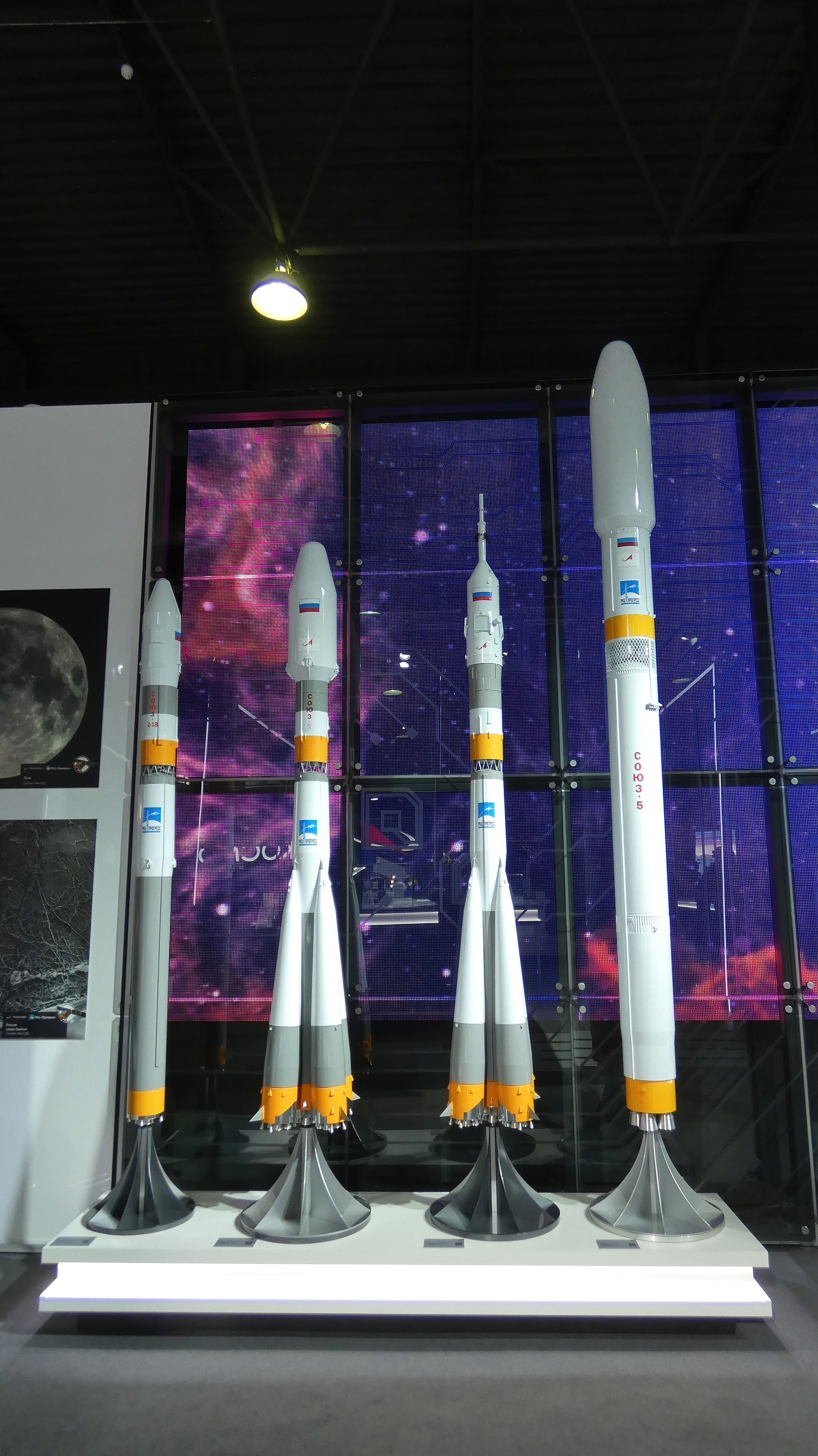
From left: Soyuz-2.1v, Soyuz-2.1a, Soyuz-2.1b and Soyuz-5)

== Variants ==
Name	GRAU index	Function	N° Stages (Note: Including boosters)	Maiden flight	Final flight	Launches (Note: As of 22 May 2020)			Remarks
Name	GRAU index	Function	N° Stages	Maiden flight	Final flight	Total	Success	Failure (+ partial)	Remarks
Soyuz/Vostok	11A510	Carrier rocket	4	27 December 1965	20 July 1966	2	2	0	Launched with prototype US-A satellites
Soyuz	11A511	Carrier rocket	3	28 November 1966	24 May 1975	30	28	2	Used for crewed Soyuz launches.
Soyuz-B	11K55	Carrier rocket	3	Unbuilt					
Soyuz-V	11K56	Carrier rocket	3	Unbuilt					
Soyuz-R	11A514	Carrier rocket	3	Unbuilt					
Soyuz-L	11A511L	Carrier rocket	3	24 November 1970	12 August 1971	3	3	0	Created to test the LK lunar lander in LEO
Soyuz-M	11A511M	Carrier rocket	3	27 December 1971	31 March 1976	8	8	0	Built to launch crewed Soyuz 7K-VI spacecraft, eventually used to launch reconnaissance satellites
Soyuz-U	11A511U	Carrier rocket	3 or 4	18 May 1973	22 February 2017	786	765	22	Single most launched carrier rocket ever built Used for crewed Soyuz launches.
Soyuz-U2	11A511U2	Carrier rocket	3	23 December 1982	3 September 1995	72	72	0	Used for crewed Soyuz launches.
Soyuz-FG	11A511U-FG	Carrier rocket	3 or 4	20 May 2001	25 September 2019	70	69	1	Used for crewed Soyuz launches.
Soyuz-2.1a / Soyuz-ST-A	14A14A	Carrier rocket	3 or 4	8 November 2004	Active	75	72	2+1p	Used for crewed Soyuz launches from Soyuz MS-16 on 9 April 2020. In August 2019 the booster lofted the uncrewed Soyuz MS-14 into orbit in order to test the spacecraft on the new rocket.
Soyuz-2.1b / Soyuz-ST-B	14A14B	Carrier rocket	3 or 4	27 December 2006	Active	90	87	2+1p	
Soyuz-2.1v	14A15	Carrier rocket	3	28 December 2013	5 February 2025	13	12	1p	1st stage uses a completely new design utilizing NK-33 engine from the N1 Moon launcher and vernier thrusters RD-0110R without side boosters.
Soyuz 5		Carrier Rocket	2 or 3	30 April 2026	Active	1	1	0	First Soyuz rocket without R7 Semyorka heritage.

The Molniya-M (1964–2010) was also derived from the Soyuz family.

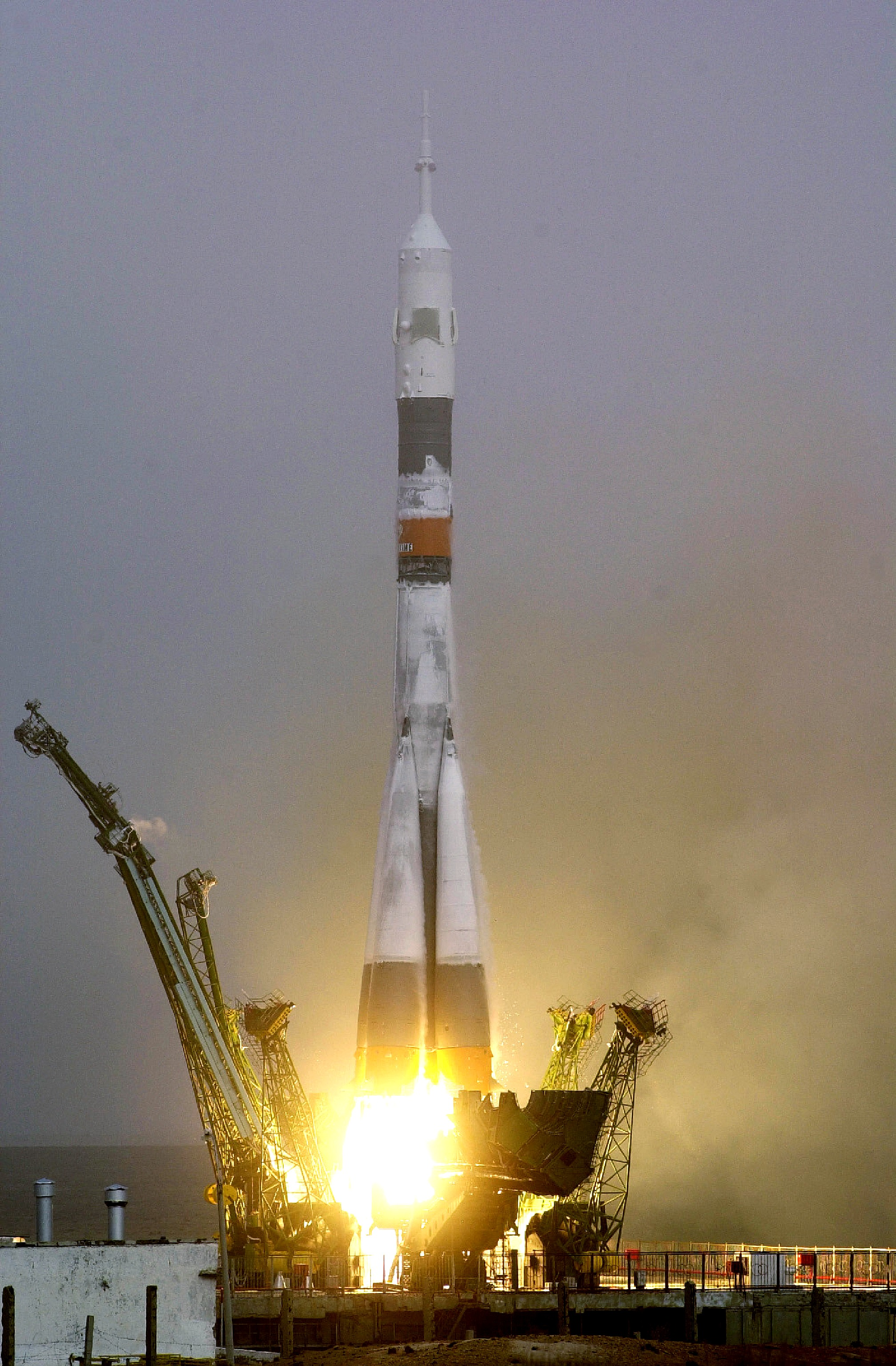
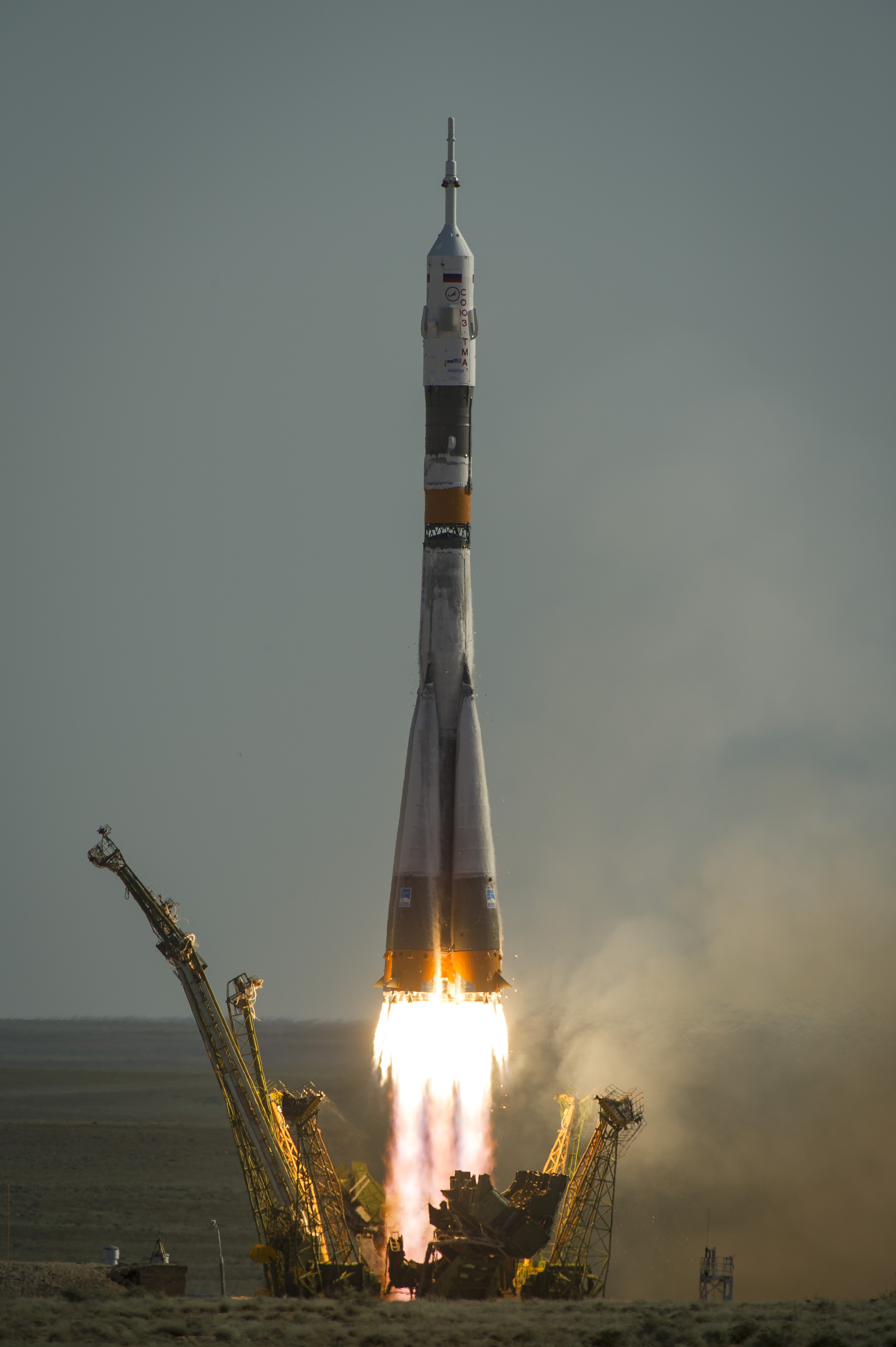
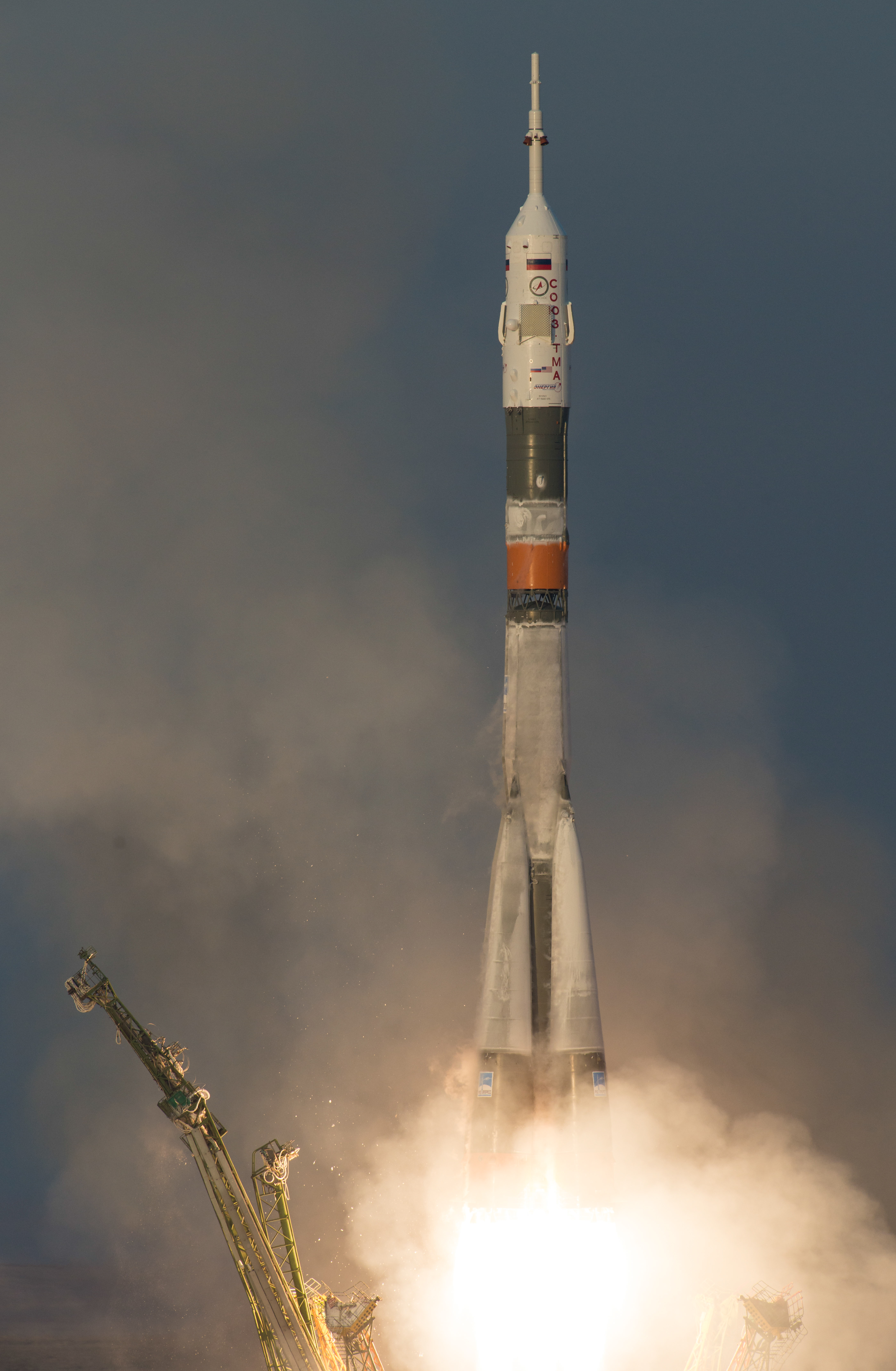
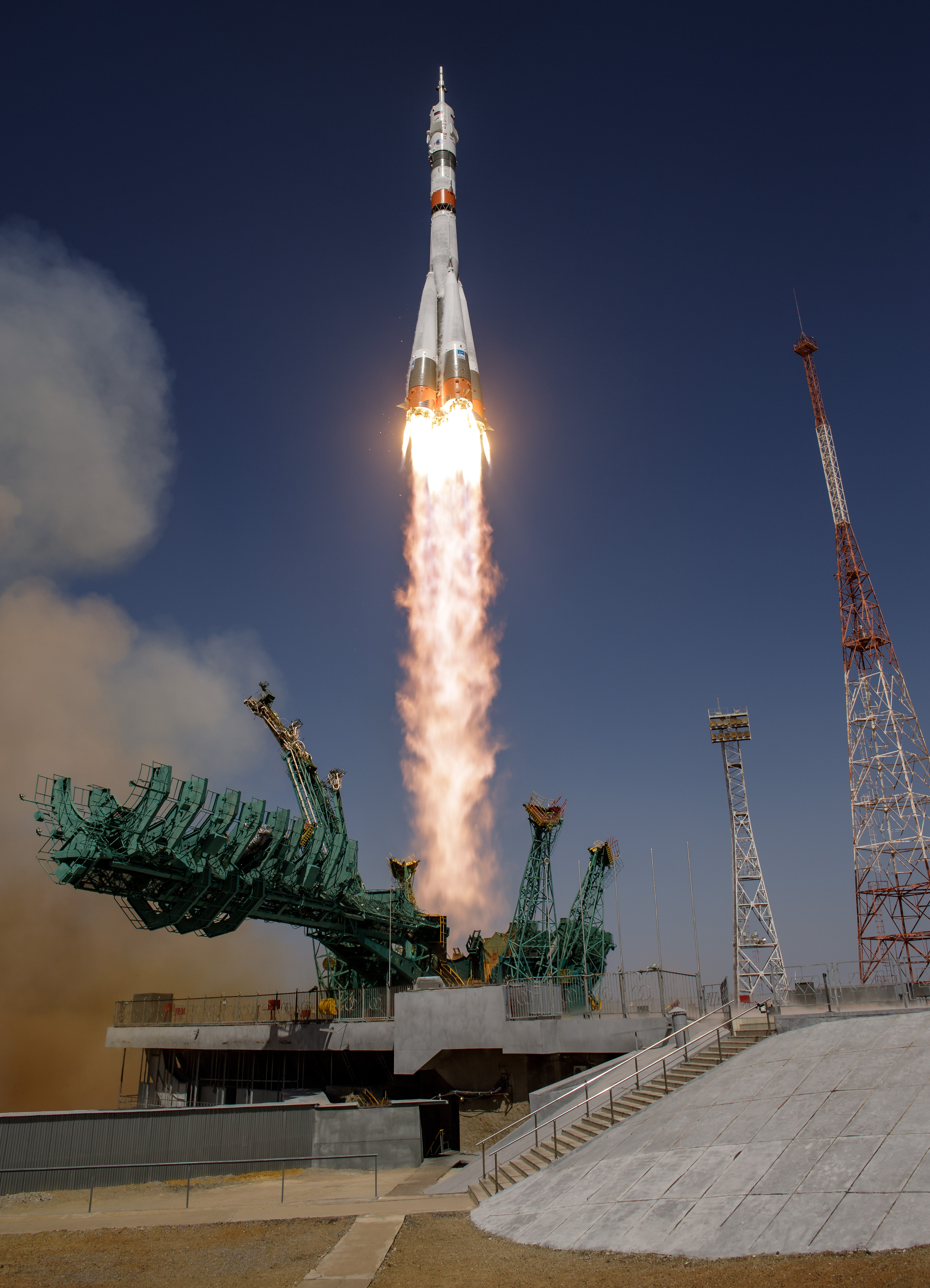
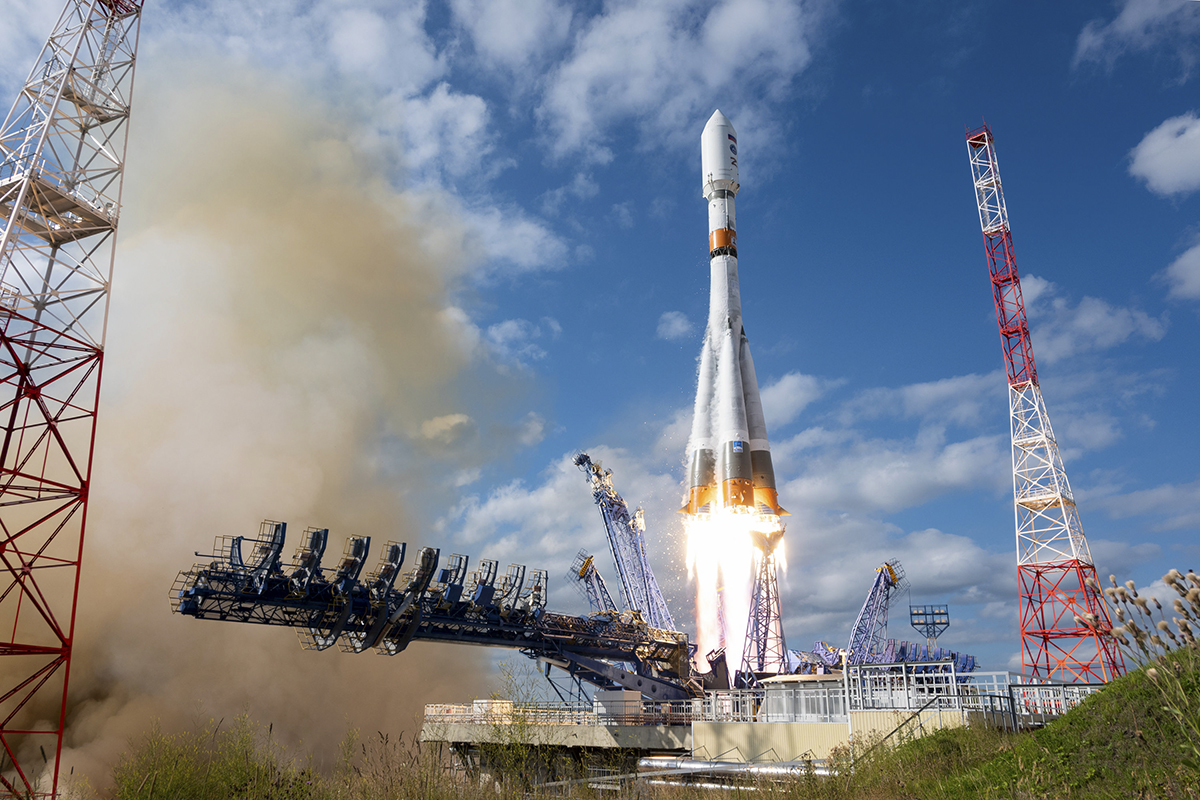
Images of Soyuz rocket launch

== Assembly ==
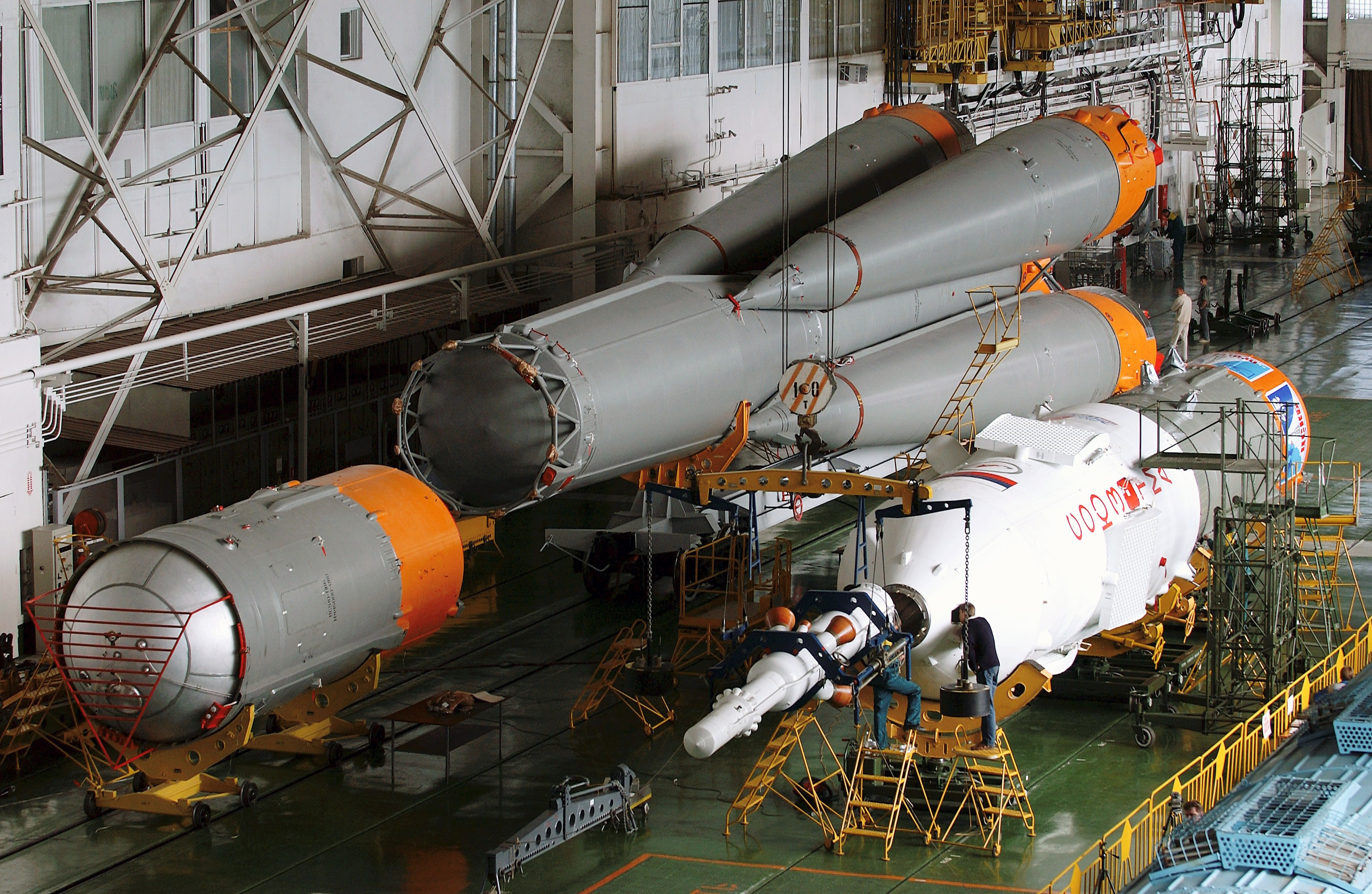
Soyuz rocket assembly: the first and second stages are in the background, already joined; the third stage is in the lower left corner of the image. The Soyuz spacecraft, covered by its launch shroud, is in the lower right corner.

The rocket is assembled horizontally in the Assembly and Testing Building. The assembled rocket is transported to the launch site in its horizontal state and then raised. This is different from the vertical assembly of, for example, the Saturn V, and is one of the features that makes Soyuz cheaper to prepare for launch. Assembling a horizontally positioned rocket is relatively simple as all modules are easily accessible. Assembling the rocket in vertical position would require a windproof high-rise hangar, which was not considered financially feasible at the time the rocket was designed, due to the failing economy of the Soviet Union.

== Prelaunch ==
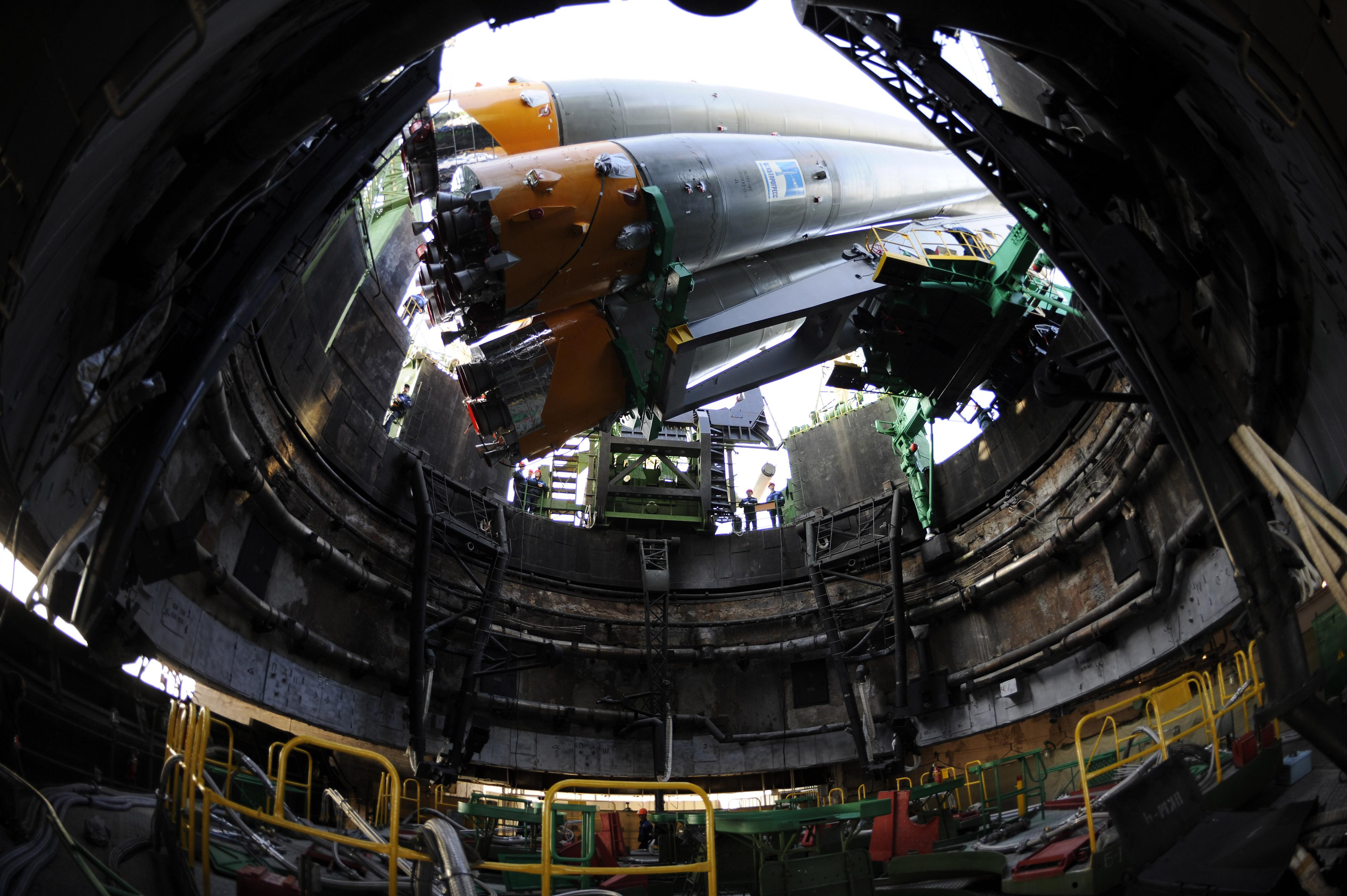
Soyuz TMA-13 being erected at the Gagarin's Start launch pad, 10 October 2008.

The entire rocket is suspended in the launch system by the load-bearing mechanisms on the strap-on boosters where they are attached to the central core. The latter rests on the nose sections of the strap-on boosters. This scheme resembles flight conditions when the strap-on boosters push the central core forward. The concept of suspending the rocket was one of the novelties introduced with the R-7/Soyuz.

Since the launch pad has been eliminated, the bottom portion of the rocket is lowered. The launch system trusses bear the wind loads. Resistance to high wind is an important feature of the launch system, as the Kazakhstan steppes, where the Baikonur launch site is located, are known for windstorms.

== Launch ==
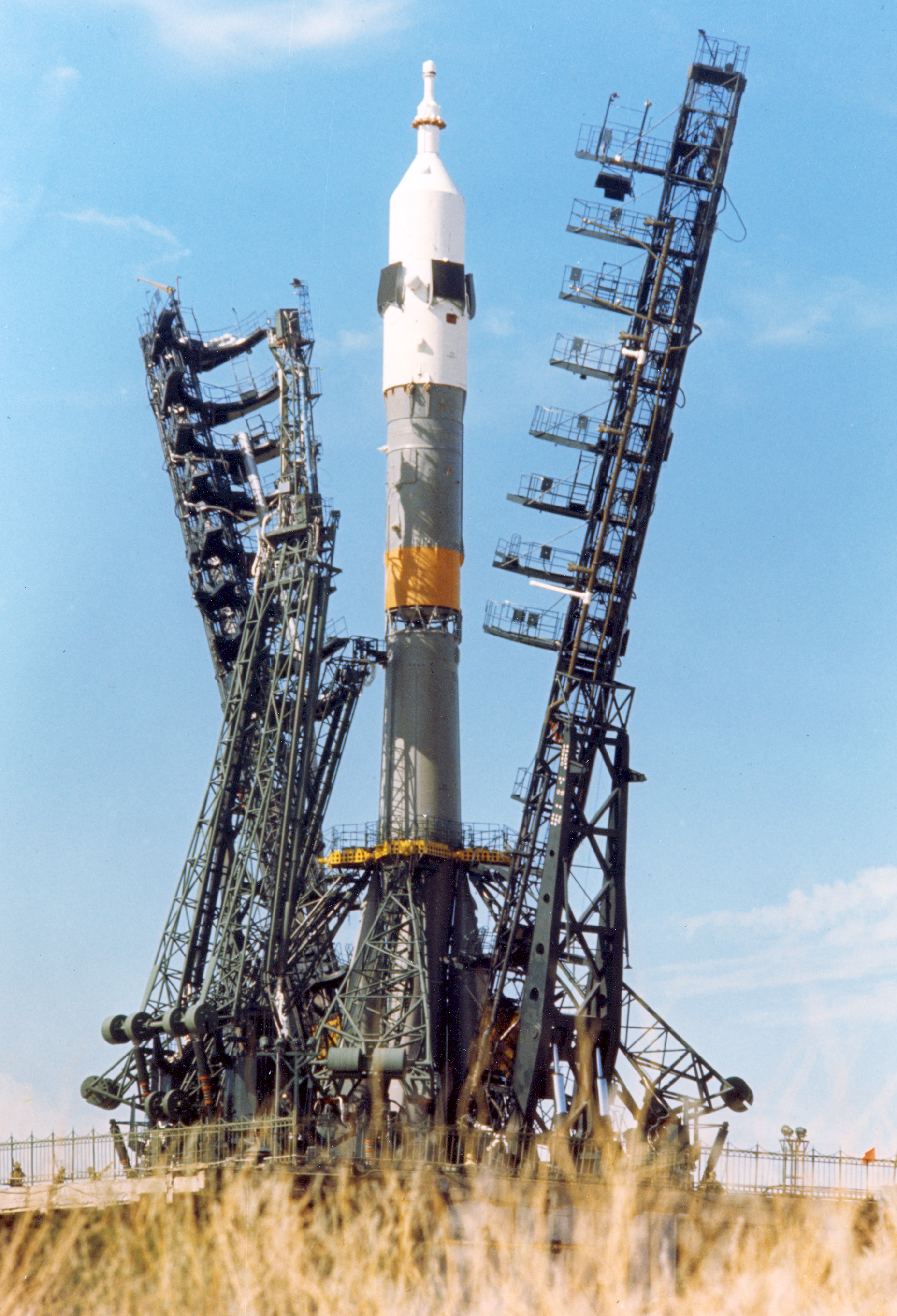
A Soyuz-U on the launch pad, ahead of the Apollo-Soyuz Test Project (ASTP) launch on 15 July 1975.

The engines are ignited by electrically initiated pyrotechnic flares, mounted on birch poles, which are ignited at approximately T-20 seconds, a few seconds before fuel components (liquid oxygen and kerosene-based liquids) are introduced into the combustion chamber. This sequence rarely fails due to its simplicity. During launch, the support booms track the movement of the rocket. After the support boom heads emerge from the special support recess in the nose sections of the strapons, the support booms and trusses disconnect from the rocket air-frame, swiveling on the support axes and freeing the way for the rocket to lift off. During launch, the rocket and the launch facility form a single dynamic system.

When the strap-on booster engines stop, the boosters fall away, providing non-impact separation. If the skies are clear, ground observers can see a Korolev cross formed by the falling boosters.

== Fairings used for uncrewed missions ==
The Soyuz launch vehicle is used for various Russian uncrewed missions and is also marketed by Starsem for commercial satellite launches. Presently the following fairing types are used:

Progress is the cargo spacecraft for uncrewed missions to the ISS and previously to Mir. The spacecraft uses a dedicated platform and fairing and can be launched with either Soyuz-U, Soyuz-FG or Soyuz-2.

A-type fairing is used for commercial launches.

S-type fairing is used for commercial launches by Starsem. The fairing has external diameter of 3.7 m and a length of 7.7 m. The Fregat upper stage is encapsulated in the fairing with the payload and a payload adapter/dispenser. S-type fairing along with Fregat upper stage were used to launch the following spacecraft: Galaxy 14, GIOVE A, Mars Express, AMOS-2, Venus Express, Cluster.

SL-type fairing is used for commercial launches by Starsem. The fairing has external diameter of 3.7 m and a length of 8.45 m. The Fregat upper stage is encapsulated in the fairing with the payload and a payload adapter/dispenser. SL-type fairing along with Fregat upper stage were used to launch the following spacecraft: CoRoT.

ST-type fairing is used for commercial launches by Starsem. Its external diameter is 4.1 m and its length is 11.4 m. It can be used with the Soyuz-2 only, because older analog control system cannot cope with aerodynamic instability introduced by a fairing this large. This carbon-plastic fairing is based on the proven configuration used for Arianespace's Ariane 4 vehicles, with its length increased by approximately one additional meter. The fairing has been developed and is being manufactured by TsSKB-Progress in accordance with the requirements of a customer (Starsem). This is the only fairing type offered by Starsem/Arianespace for launches from Kourou. Progress M-UM is the only Progress Spacecraft that was launched while being enclosed in a ST fairing.

== Stages ==
Exploded plan of Soyuz FG rocket

=== First stage ===
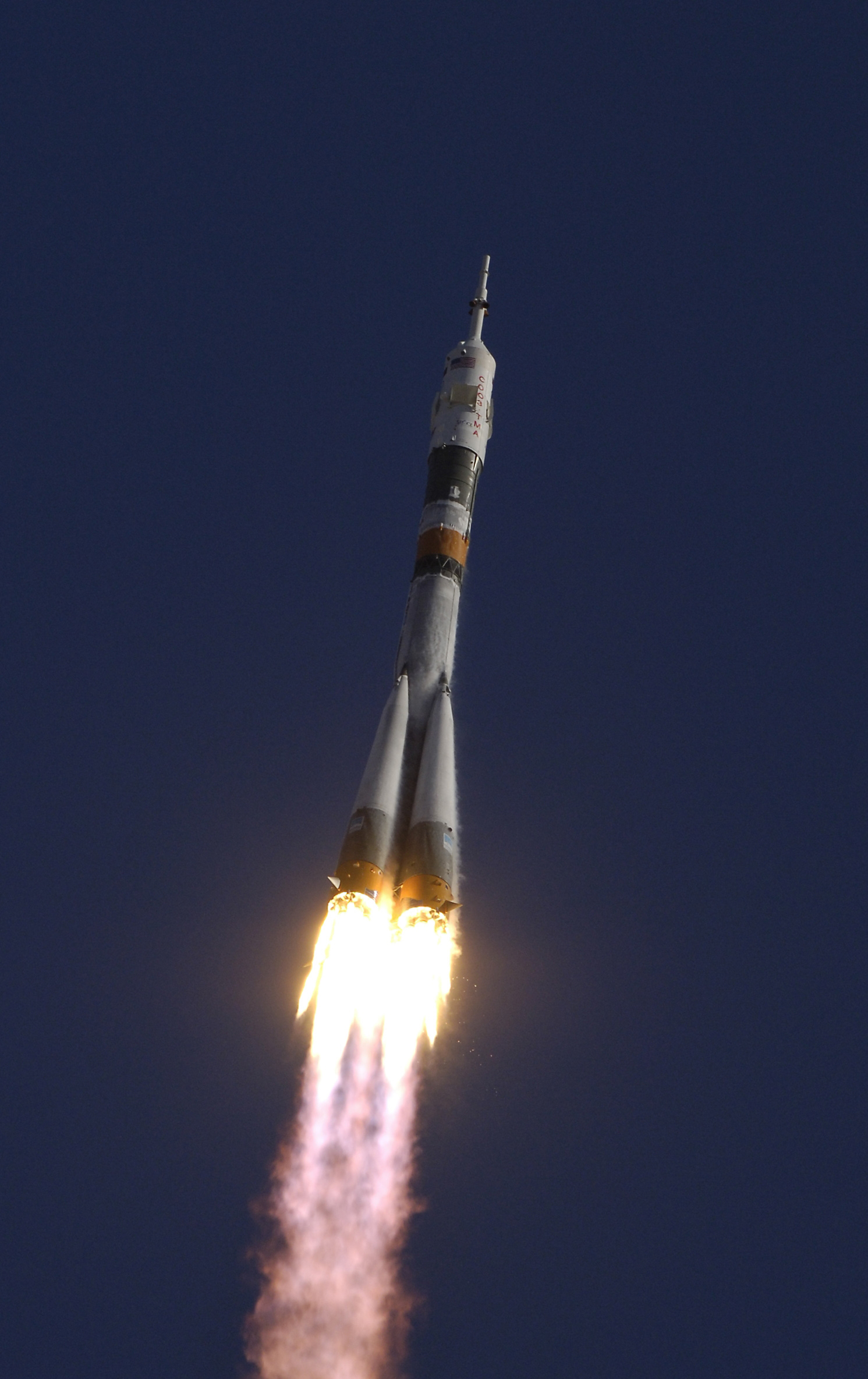
The first stage hauling the Soyuz TMA-9 crew up to the ISS, 2006.

The first stage of Soyuz rockets consists of four identical conical liquid booster rockets strapped to the second stage core. These boosters are also called Blok-B, V, G, and D. (Note: This is a transliteration of the second through fifth letters of the Cyrillic alphabet (Б, В, Г, Д). The English translation is Block B, C, D and E.) Each engine has four main combustion chambers and two vernier thruster combustion chambers for attitude control. The engine is pump-fed by a hydrogen peroxide gas generator. Propellant tanks are pressurized using liquid nitrogen vaporization.

Statistics (each of 4 boosters):

- Height: 19.6 metres (64 feet 4 inches)
- Diameter: 2.68 metres (8 feet 10 inches)
- Empty mass: 3,784 kilograms (8,342 lb)
- Gross mass: 43,400 kilograms (95,700 lb)
- Propellant mass: 39,160 kilograms (86,330 lb)
  - Oxidizer load (liquid oxygen): 27,900 kilograms (61,500 lb)
  - Fuel load (RP-1): 11,260 kilograms (24,820 lb)
- Powered by: 1 × RD-107A
- Maximum thrust:
  - At sea level: 838.5 kilonewtons (188,500 lb_{f})
  - In vacuum: 1,021.3 kilonewtons (229,600 lb_{f})
- Specific impulse:
  - At sea level: 262 seconds (2.57 km/s)
  - In vacuum: 319 seconds (3.13 km/s)
- Burn time: 118 seconds
- Throttling: two-level
- Stage separation: Pyrotechnic fastener/springs/reaction nozzle

=== Second stage ===
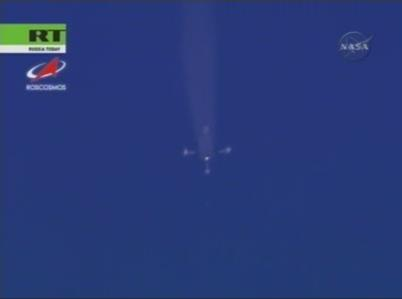
Here the four first-stage boosters fall away (Soyuz TMA-12), creating a cross smoke pattern in the sky, also known as a Korolev cross.

The Soyuz booster's second stage, also called Blok-A, is a single, generally cylindrical stage with one motor at the base, activated alongside the first-stage boosters. Like each first-stage booster, it also has four combustion chambers but with four (instead of two) vernier thruster combustion chambers for attitude control. The engine is pump-fed by a hydrogen peroxide gas generator. Propellant tanks are pressurized using liquid nitrogen vaporization. The second stage tapers toward the bottom, allowing the four first-stage rockets to fit more closely together.

Statistics:

- Height: 27.1 metres (88 feet 11 inches)
- Diameter: 2.95 metres (9 feet 8 inches)
- Empty mass: 6,545 kilograms (14,429 lb)
- Gross mass: 99,765 kilograms (219,944 lb)
- Propellant mass: 90,100 kilograms (198,600 lb)
  - Oxidizer load (liquid oxygen): 63,800 kilograms (140,700 lb)
  - Fuel load (RP-1): 26,300 kilograms (58,000 lb)
- Powered by: 1 × RD-108A
- Maximum thrust:
  - At sea level: 792.5 kilonewtons (178,200 lb_{f})
  - In vacuum: 990.2 kilonewtons (222,600 lb_{f})
- Specific impulse:
  - At sea level: 255 seconds (2.50 km/s)
  - In vacuum: 319 seconds (3.13 km/s)
- Burn time: 286 seconds
- Throttling: one-level
- Stage separation: Pyrotechnic fastener/hot staging

=== Third stage ===
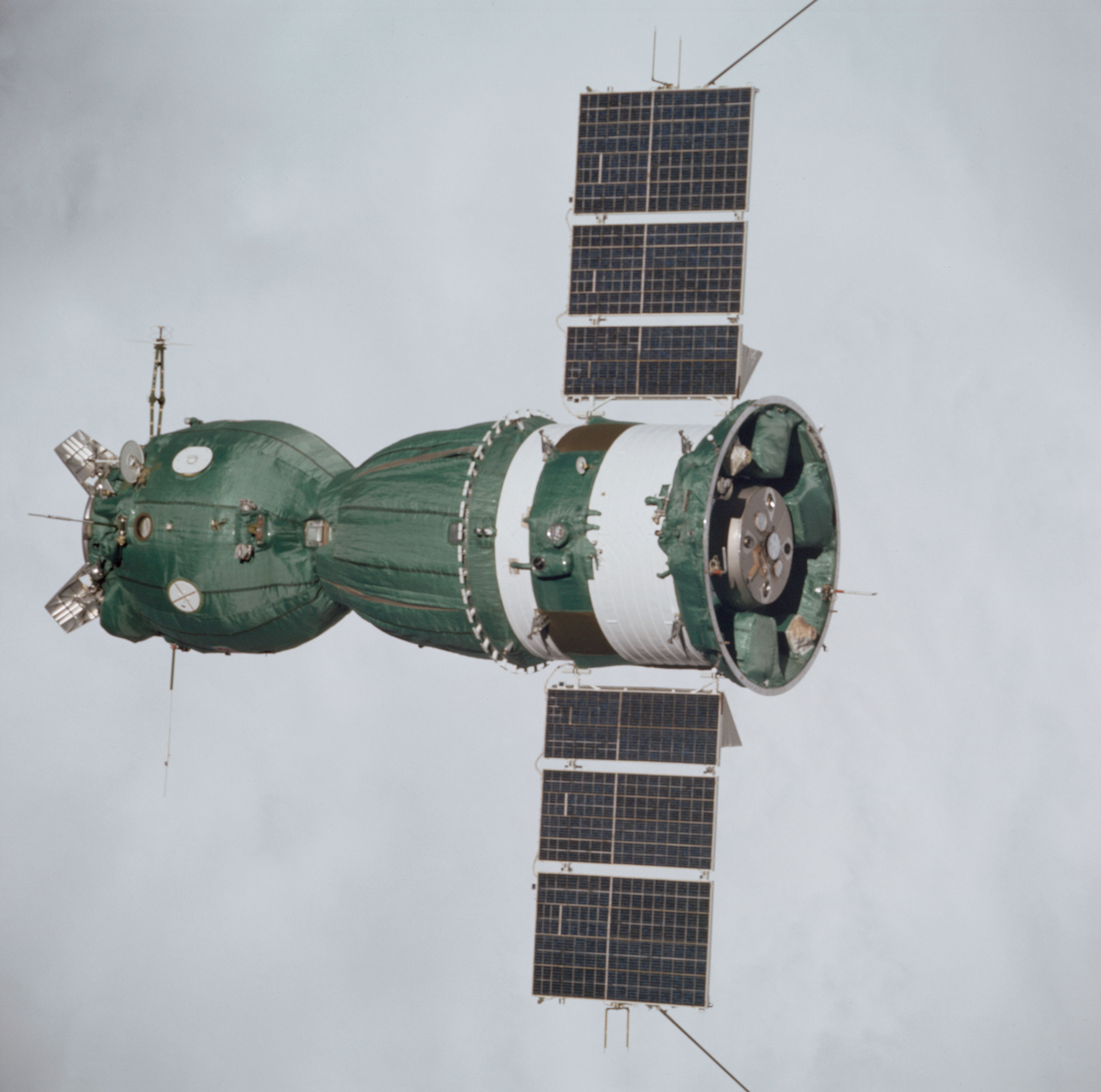
One of the common payloads of the Soyuz rocket family, a Soyuz spacecraft. This one is for Apollo Soyuz Test Project, an international docking mission with Apollo spacecraft of the United States.

There are two variant upper stages in use, the Blok-I (used on the Soyuz 2.1a) and the Improved Blok-I (used on the Soyuz 2.1b).

Statistics:

- Height: 6.7 metres (22 feet 0 inches)
- Diameter: 2.66 metres (8 feet 9 inches)
- Empty mass: 2,355 kilograms (5,192 lb)
- Gross mass: 27,755 kilograms (61,189 lb)
- Propellant mass: 25,400 kilograms (56,000 lb)
  - Oxidizer load (liquid oxygen): 17,800 kilograms (39,200 lb)
  - Fuel load (RP-1): 7,600 kilograms (16,800 lb)
- Blok-I powered by: 1 × RD-0110 with four main combustion chambers and four vernier thrusters combustion chambers for attitude control. The engine is pump-fed by using gas pressure generated by the vernier thrusters. The propellant tanks are pressurized with oxygen vaporization and generator gases.
  - Maximum thrust: 297.9 kilonewtons (67,000 lb_{f})
  - Specific impulse: 325 seconds (3.19 km/s)
  - Chamber pressure 6.8 MPa (986 psi)
  - Burn time: 250 seconds
- Improved Blok-I powered by: 1 × RD-0124 with four main combustion chambers, each gimbaling in one axis for attitude control. The engine is pump-fed by using a closed-cycle gas generator. The propellant tanks are pressurized with helium vaporization.
  - Maximum thrust: 297.9 kilonewtons (67,000 lb_{f})
  - Specific impulse: 359 seconds (3.52 km/s)
  - Chamber pressure 16.2 MPa (2350 psi)
  - Burn time: 270 seconds

== See also ==
- Comparison of orbital launchers families
- List of R-7 launches, including launches of the Soyuz rocket family
- Delta (rocket family)
