= RD-0210 =

Russian rocket engine

RD-0210 (РД-0210)
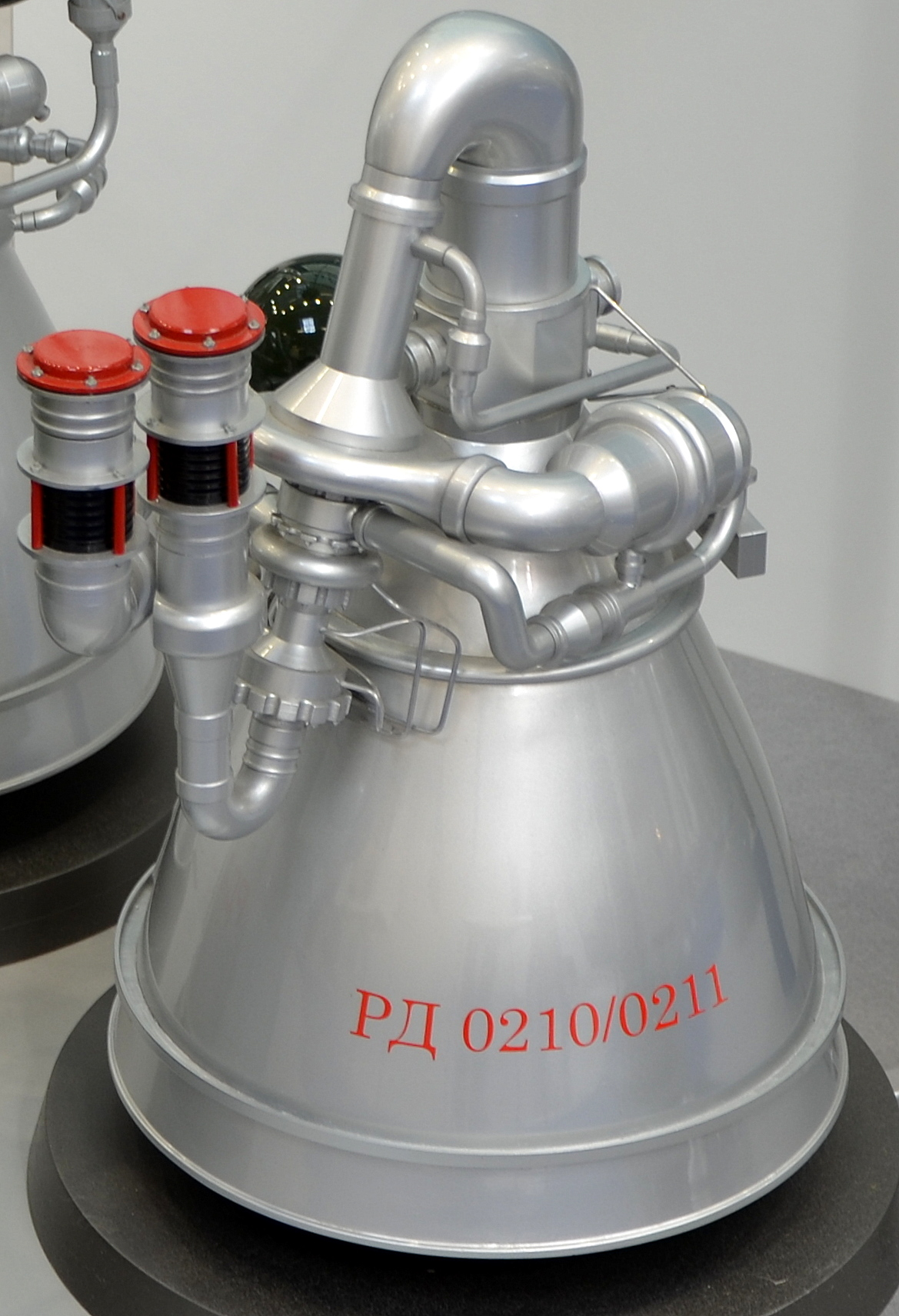
- Mockup
- Country of origin: Soviet Union; Russia
- First flight: 1967-03-10
- Designer: OKB-154, Yankel I. Guerchkovitch
- Manufacturer: Voronezh Mechanical Plant
- Application: Upper Stage
- Associated LV: Proton
- Predecessor: RD-0208
- Status: In Production

Liquid-fuel engine
- Propellant: N_{2}O_{4} / UDMH
- Mixture ratio: 2.6
- Cycle: Oxidizer-rich staged combustion

Configuration
- Chamber: 1

Performance
- Thrust, vacuum: 582 kN (131,000 lbf)
- Chamber pressure: 14.7 MPa (2,130 psi)
- Specific impulse, vacuum: 326.5s
- Burn time: 220s

Dimensions
- Length: 2,327 mm (91.6 in)
- Diameter: 1,470 mm (58 in)
- Dry mass: 566 kg (1,248 lb)

Used in
- UR-200 and UR-500 and Proton second stage

The RD-0210 (Russian: Ракетный Двигатель-0210, romanized: Raketnyy Dvigatel-0210, lit. 'Rocket Engine 0210', GRAU index: 8D411K) is also known as the RD-465. It and its twin, the RD-0211, are rocket engines using unsymmetrical dimethylhydrazine (UDMH) as fuel and dinitrogen tetroxide (N_{2}O_{4}) as an oxidizer in an oxidizer-rich staged combustion cycle. They have a single nozzle, possess thrust vectoring and are the latest evolution in the RD-0203/4 lineage. They are the engines used on the Proton second stage. The RD-0213 is a fixed nozzle variation that is used on the RD-0212 module of the Proton third stage.

== Development ==
When Chelomey's OKB-52 started their UR-200 ICBM project, they requested S. A. Kosberg's OKB-154 to develop the propulsion. They decided to use the same basic block for both the first and second stage. But to achieve the required performance, Kosberg had to develop a staged combustion engine, a then extremely aggressive feat. Only M. V. Melnikov of OKB-1 had designed a staged combustion engine before, the S1.5400, and it used a different propellant mix with significantly less thrust.

To simplify design and manufacture, the engine would be used both on the first and the second stages. The first stage would use a module - the RD-0202 - that comprised three RD-0203 and one RD-0204, while the upper stage would use a RD-0205 module comprising a RD-0206 main engine plus an auxiliary vernier engine, the RD-0207. The RD-0204 only difference to the RD-0203 was that it included a heat exchanger to heat the pressurant gases for the first stage tank. The RD-0206 was very similar to the RD-0204, but its nozzle was vacuum optimized and had a fixed nozzle. The thrust vector control task was delegated to the four nozzle RD-0207 vernier engine. While the UR-200 project was in direct competition to the R-36 and was cancelled in favor of the latter, it did have a few test launches and thus was a proven design.

When Chelomey started his super heavy ICBM UR-500 (8K82) project, he originally intended to use multiple UR-200 modules as a first stage. When this concept proved not viable, and the multi-body that was finally used was settled on, they had to search for new propulsion on the first stage. For the second stage, they adapted the UR-200 first stage's. It needed new tanks to match the first stage, but most of the rest could be adapted. The engines had to be started in the air and had to get longer nozzles, optimized for vacuum operation. Both of this features were demonstrated on the RD-0206, and were readily adapted. They also received a thrust vector gimbaling system, to have better control during launch. Thus, the RD-0208/RD-0209 were born. In a parallel case with the RD-0203/4, the RD-0209 was a version of the RD-0208 that included a heat exchanger.

When the UR-500 proved to be too big as an ICBM, the application of the vehicle as a weapon was cancelled. But it could be adapted as a heavy launch vehicle that could perform important missions for the Soviet moonshot, and so the Proton-K (8K82) was born. This allowed Chelomey to pitch it as a competitor, along the UR-700 project, of Korolev's N-1. For this new missions, it would not need to comply with ICBM specification standards, but would need at least a third stage. The second stage was enlarged, and the RD-0208/9 were revised as the RD-0210 and RD-0211 by uprating them slightly and significantly increasing the burning time. For the third stage, the UR-200 second stage was adapted -again, with the same 4.1m tanking as the first and second stages- and the RD-0205 module with an RD-0206 and an RD-0207 vernier engine was given an overhaul. The new module, - known as RD-0212 - consisted of an RD-0213 and an RD-0214 vernier engine. The RD-0213 was a RD-0206 brought to RD-0211/12 standards, and the RD-0214 was a revised RD-0207.

== History ==
The RD-0203/4 was the second staged combustion engine in the world, only after the S1.5400, and was also the first staged combustion engine with storable propellants.

On 15 September 1968 the RD-0210, RD-0211 and the RD-0212 module launched the Zond 5 around the Moon on a free return trajectory, that sent the first alive organisms around the moon and back to Earth.

On 19 April 1971 a Proton orbited Salyut 1 the first space station to orbit the Earth.

On 19 May 1971 a Proton launched the Mars 2 probe to Mars. The orbiter was identical to the Venera 9 bus, and the lander was the first man made object to reach the surface of Mars.

On 8 June 1975 a Proton launched the Venera 9 to Venus. It consisted of an orbiter based on the Mars 2 design, and a lander which was sent the first pictured from the surface of Venus.

On 20 November 1998 a Proton launched Zarya the first module of the ISS.

On 12 July 2000 a Proton launched Zvezda, the third module launched of the ISS and the center of the Russian portion of the station - the Russian Orbital Segment.

== Versions ==
The basic engine has been used for the UR-200 first and second stages, the UR-500 second stage and the Proton second and third stages. Each variation is as follows:

- RD-0203 (GRAU Index: 8D44): The second staged combustion rocket in the world, and the first hypergolic. It used an oxidizer-rich preburner and had a thrust of 559.00 kN (125,670 lbf). Propulsion of the UR-200 first stage.
- RD-0204: Slight variation of the RD-0203 that included a heat exchanger for heating the tank pressurizant gases. Propulsion of the UR-200 first stage.
- RD-0206 (GRAU Index: 8D47): Variation of the RD-0203/4, optimized for vacuum expansion and no TVC. Used on the UR-200 second stage.
- RD-0208 (GRAU Index: 8D411): Evolution of the RD-0203, with vacuum optimized nozzle and air start capability. Used on the second stage of the UR-500.
- RD-0209 (GRAU Index: 8D412): Same as RD-0208, but with a heat exchanger. Used on the second stage of the UR-500.
- RD-0210 (GRAU Index: 8D411K): Also known as the RD-465, it is an evolution of the RD-0208. Used on the second stage of the Proton-K and Proton-M rockets.
- RD-0211 (GRAU Index: 8D412K): Also known as the RD-468, it is the same as RD-0210, but with a heat exchanger like the RD-0209. Used on the second stage of the Proton-K and Proton-M rockets.
- RD-0213 (GRAU Index: 8D48): Variation of the RD-0210/11, optimized for vacuum expansion and no TVC. Used on the RD-0212 propulsion module of the Proton third stage.

== Modules ==
Some of these engines were bundled into modules of multiple engines. The relevant modules and auxiliary engines are:

- RD-0202 (GRAU Index: 8D45): A module comprising three RD-0203 and a single RD-0204. Propulsion module of the UR-200 first stage.
- RD-0205 (GRAU Index: 8D46): A module comprising an RD-0206 and an RD-0207 vernier engine. Propulsion of the UR-200 second stage.
- RD-0212 (GRAU Index: 8D49): Also known as the RD-473, it is a propulsion module comprising one RD-0213 and an RD-0214 vernier engine. Propulsion module of the third stage of the Proton-K and Proton-M rockets.

RD-0210 Family of Engines
Engine	RD-0203	RD-0204	RD-0206	RD-0208	RD-0209	RD-0210	RD-0211	RD-0213
AKA	8D44	8D44	8D47	8D411	8D412	8D411K	8D412K	8D48
Propulsion Module	RD-0202		RD-0205 (with RD-0207)					RD-0212 (with RD-0214)
Development	1961-1964	1961-1964	1961-1964	1962-1966	1962-1966	1962-1967	1962-1967	1962-1967
Engine Type	Liquid oxidizer-rich staged combustion using N_{2}O_{4}/UDMH propellant with an O/F ratio of 2.6							
Combustion Chamber Pressure	14.7 MPa (2,130 psi)							
Nozzle	Single nozzle (Fixed)	Single nozzle	Single nozzle (Fixed)	Single nozzle with TVC	Single nozzle with TVC	Single nozzle with TVC	Single nozzle with TVC	Single nozzle (Fixed)
Thrust (Vacuum)	559 kN (126,000 lbf)	559 kN (126,000 lbf)	575.5 kN (129,400 lbf)	570 kN (130,000 lbf)	570 kN (130,000 lbf)	582 kN (131,000 lbf)	582 kN (131,000 lbf)	582 kN (131,000 lbf)
Thrust (Sea Level)	500 kN (110,000 lbf)	500 kN (110,000 lbf)						
Isp (Vacuum)	311s	311s	326s	326s	326s	326.5s	326.5s	326.5s
Isp(Sea Level)	278s	278s						
Burn Time	136s	136s	150s	150s	150s	220s	220s	250s
Length	1.8 m (71 in)	1.8 m (71 in)		2,327 mm (91.6 in)	2,327 mm (91.6 in)	2,327 mm (91.6 in)	2,327 mm (91.6 in)	3,008 mm (118.4 in)
Width	890 mm (35 in)	890 mm (35 in)	1,470 mm (58 in)	1,470 mm (58 in)	1,470 mm (58 in)	1,470 mm (58 in)	1,470 mm (58 in)	1,470 mm (58 in)
Dry Weight	381 kilograms (840 lb)	381 kilograms (840 lb)		540 kilograms (1,190 lb)	540 kilograms (1,190 lb)	566 kilograms (1,248 lb)	566 kilograms (1,248 lb)	550 kilograms (1,210 lb)
Use	UR-200; First Stage	UR-200; First Stage	UR-200; Second Stage	UR-500; Second Stage	UR-500; Second Stage	Proton; Second Stage	Proton; Second Stage	Proton; Third Stage
First Launch	1963-11-06	1963-11-06	1963-11-06	1965-07-16	1965-07-16	1967-03-10	1967-03-10	1967-03-10
Last Launch	1964-10-20	1964-10-20	1964-10-20	1966-07-06	1966-07-06			
Status	Retired	Retired	Retired	Retired	Retired	In Production	In Production	In Production
References								

== See also ==
- RD-0207 - Companion vernier engine of the RD-0207.
- RD-0214 - Companion vernier engine of the RD-0213.
- Proton - uses RD-0210/11 and RD-0212.
- UR-200 - Used the RD-0202 and RD-0205 propulsion modules.
- KBKhA - The RD-0210/11 and RD-0212 design bureau.
- Voronezh Mechanical Plant - A space hardware manufacturing company that makes the RD-0210/11 and RD-0212.
- Rocket engine
