= RD-0110R =

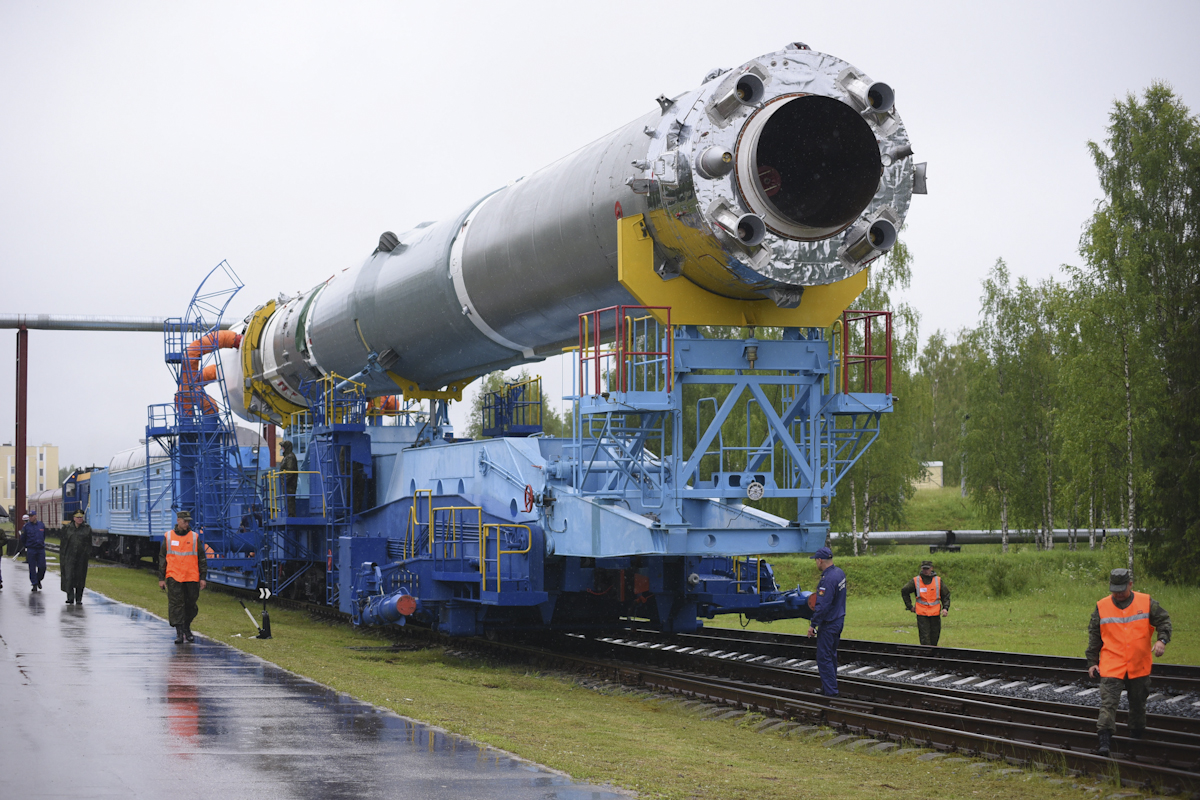
- The four nozzles of the RD-0110R surround the large single nozzle of the NK-33 engine on the first stage of the Soyuz-2.1v.
- Country of origin: Russia
- First flight: 2013-12-28
- Designer: KBKhA, Viktor Gorokhov
- Manufacturer: Voronezh Mechanical Plant
- Application: 1st stage vernier engine
- Associated LV: Soyuz-2.1v
- Predecessor: RD-0110
- Status: Retired

Liquid-fuel engine
- Propellant: LOX / RG-1
- Cycle: Gas-generator

Configuration
- Chamber: 4

Performance
- Thrust, vacuum: 265.1 kN (59,600 lb_{f})
- Thrust, sea-level: 230.5 kN (51,800 lb_{f})
- Chamber pressure: 6.6 MPa (960 psi)
- Specific impulse, vacuum: 298.4 s (2.926 km/s)
- Specific impulse, sea-level: 259.4 s (2.544 km/s)
- Burn time: 210 seconds

Dimensions
- Length: 1,910 mm (75 in)
- Diameter: 2,675 mm (105.3 in)
- Dry mass: 850 kg (1,870 lb) including the support ring

Used in
- Soyuz-2.1v first stage

The RD-0110R (Russian: Ракетный Двигатель-0110Р (Р - рулевой), romanized: Raketnyy Dvigatel-0110R, lit. 'Rocket Engine 0110R (R - rulevoy, steering)', GRAU index: 14D24) was a rocket engine burning kerosene in liquid oxygen in a gas generator combustion cycle. It had four nozzles that can gimbal up to 45 degrees in a single axis and was used as the vernier thruster on the Soyuz-2.1v first stage. It also had heat exchangers that heat oxygen and helium to pressurize the LOX and RG-1 tanks of the Soyuz-2.1v first stage, respectively. The oxygen was supplied from the same LOX tank in liquid form, while the helium was supplied from separate high pressure bottles (known as the T tank).

The engine's development started in 2010 and it is a heavily modified version of the RD-0110. The main areas of work were shortening the nozzles to optimize them for the atmospheric part of the flight (the RD-0110 is a vacuum optimized engine), propellant piping, heat exchangers and the gimballing system, which was developed by RKTs Progress. The RD-0110R engine was produced at the Voronezh Mechanical Plant.

== See also ==
- Soyuz-2-1v - The first rocket to use the RD-0110R
- KBKhA - The RD-0110R designer bureau
- RSC Progress - The designer of the Soyuz-2.1v and the RD-0110R nozzle gimbal
- Voronezh Mechanical Plant - A space hardware manufacturer company that manufactures the RD-0110R
