= RD-0120 =

Soviet rocket engine

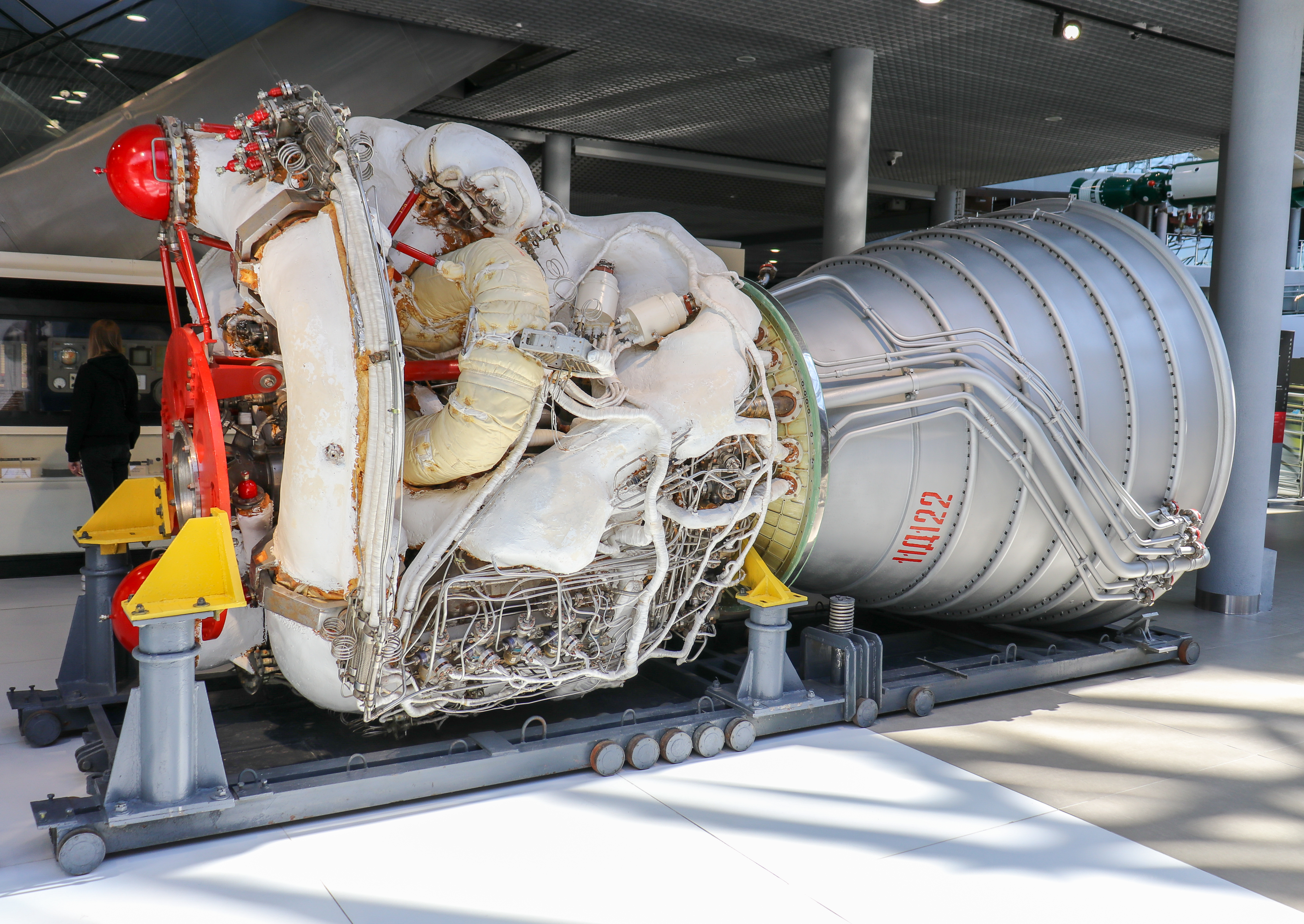
- Model of RD-0120
- Country of origin: Soviet Union
- First flight: 15 May 1987
- Last flight: 15 November 1988
- Designer: OKB-154
- Manufacturer: Voronezh Mechanical Plant
- Application: Sustainer engine
- Associated LV: Energia
- Successor: RD-0122
- Status: Retired

Liquid-fuel engine
- Propellant: LOX / LH_{2}
- Mixture ratio: 6:1
- Cycle: Staged combustion

Configuration
- Chamber: 1
- Nozzle ratio: 85.70

Performance
- Thrust, vacuum: 1,961.3 kN (440,900 lbf), 106%
- Thrust, sea-level: 1,526 kN (343,000 lbf), 106%
- Thrust-to-weight ratio: 57.93, vac., 106% thrust
- Chamber pressure: 21.9 MPa (3,180 psi)
- Specific impulse, vacuum: 455 s (4.46 km/s)
- Specific impulse, sea-level: 354 s (3.47 km/s)
- Burn time: 500 s
- Gimbal range: ±7°

Dimensions
- Length: 4,550 mm (179 in)
- Diameter: 2,420 mm (95 in)
- Dry mass: 3,450 kg (7,610 lb)

Used in
- Energia core stage

References
- Notes: Data is for the operational variant (from 2nd flight onwards) at 106% of rated power level.

The RD-0120 (Russian: Ракетный Двигатель-0120, romanized: Raketnyy Dvigatel-0120, lit. 'Rocket Engine 0120', GRAU index: 11D122) was the Energia core rocket engine, fueled by LH_{2}/LOX, roughly equivalent to the RS-25 (Space Shuttle Main Engine, SSME). These were attached to the Energia core rather than the orbiter, so were not recoverable after a flight, but created a more modular design (the Energia core could be used for a variety of missions besides launching the shuttle). The RD-0120 and the RS-25 have both similarities and differences. The RD-0120 achieved a slightly higher specific impulse and combustion chamber pressure with reduced complexity and cost (but it was single-use), as compared to the RS-25. It uses a fuel-rich staged combustion cycle and a single shaft to drive both the fuel and oxidizer turbopumps. Some of the Russian design features, such as the simpler and cheaper channel wall nozzles, were evaluated by Rocketdyne for possible upgrades to the RS-25. It achieved combustion stability without the acoustic resonance chambers that the RS-25 required.

== Specifications ==
=== RD-0120 ===
- Thrust at 106% throttle (vacuum): 1,961.3 kN (200 t_{f}; 441,000 lbf), (sea-level): 1,526 kN (155.6 t_{f}; 343,100 lbf)
- Specific impulse (vacuum): 455 seconds (4.46 km/s), (sea-level): 354 seconds (3.47 km/s)
- Burn time: nominal 480–500 s, certified for 1670 s
- Basic engine weight: 3,450 kg (7,610 lb)
- Length: 4.55 m, diameter: 2.42 m
- Propellants: LOX / LH_{2}
- Mixture ratio: 6:1
- Contractor: Chemical Automatics Design Bureau (Конструкторское Бюро Химавтоматики)
- Vehicle application: Energia core stage.

== See also ==
- RD-170 — the rocket engine used on Energia's strap-on boosters
