= RD-0110 =

Soviet (later Russian) rocket engine

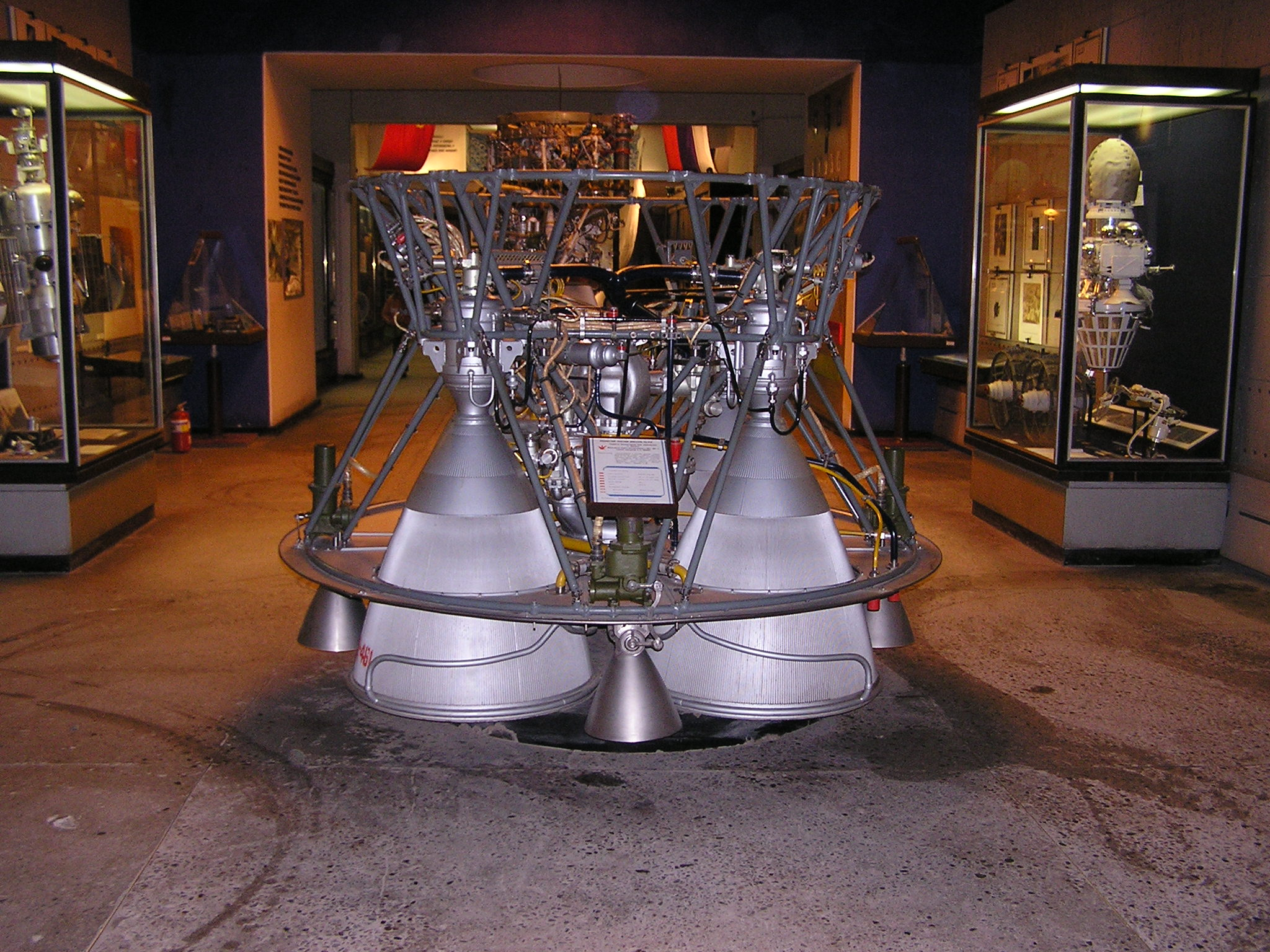
- RD-0110 on display at the Museum of Space and Missile Technology in Saint Petersburg in September 2008
- Country of origin: Soviet Union; Russia
- First flight: 1965-10-05
- Designer: Chemical Automatics Design Bureau
- Manufacturer: Voronezh Mechanical Plant
- Application: Upper stage engine
- Associated LV: Current: Soyuz-2.1a; Retired: Molniya-M and most Soyuz family rockets
- Predecessor: RD-0108
- Successor: RD-0124
- Status: In production

Liquid-fuel engine
- Propellant: LOX / RG-1
- Mixture ratio: 2.2
- Cycle: Gas-generator

Configuration
- Chamber: 4 main, 4 vernier thruster

Performance
- Thrust, vacuum: 298.03 kN (67,000 lb_{f})
- Thrust-to-weight ratio: 74.36
- Chamber pressure: 6.8 MPa (990 psi)
- Specific impulse, vacuum: 325 s (3.19 km/s)
- Burn time: 250 seconds

Dimensions
- Length: 1,575 mm (62.0 in)
- Diameter: 2,240 mm (88 in)
- Dry mass: 408.5 kg (901 lb)

Used in
- Molniya-M Block-I and on most Soyuz Block-I

The RD-0110 (Russian: Ракетный Двигатель-0110, romanized: Raketnyy Dvigatel-0110, lit. 'Rocket Engine 0110', and its derivatives, the RO-8, RD-0108, RD-461) is a rocket engine burning liquid oxygen and kerosene in a gas generator combustion cycle. It has four fixed nozzles and the output of the gas generator is directed to four secondary vernier nozzles to provide attitude control for the stage. It has an extensive flight history with its initial versions having flown more than 65 years ago.

== History ==
OKB-154 of S.A. Kosberg was tasked with developing an engine for the unmanned Molniya Block-I stage. Thus, the RD-0107 was developed in the 1960 to 1961 period, based on the RD-0106 (GRAU Index: 8D715) engine that powered the SS-8 Sasin ICBM, also designed by OKB-154. It also leveraged the experience in the field from the Vostok Block-E RD-0105/RD-0109 development. The engine had its debut flight on 10 October 1960, and the last Molniya flight was on 22 October 1967.

For the crewed carrying Voskhod Block-I, a version of the engine that complied with the human rating 3K Regulations was needed. During 1963 OKB-154 developed this new version of the engine. Known with by the GRAU index 8D715P, the RD-0108 kept the same characteristics and performance of the RD-0107 while fully complying with the crew rating regulations. This engine had its first flight on 16 November 1963, and last flew on 29 June 1976.

For the Molniya-M Block-I, OKB-154 did an improvement program that put special emphasis on the reliability of the engine. This project gave birth to the RD-0110. A particular problem observed during acceptance testing were high frequency instabilities, particularly during the start sequence. But it was solved by installing of longitudinal felt ribs on the combustion chamber. The development of the RD-0110 was performed in 9 months during 1963, with its inaugural flight happening in 1964. It is also used on the Soyuz third stage in all models until the RD-0124 debut on the 2.1b. It has flown over 1350 times, and accumulated more than 336,500 s of burn time and is still flown many times per year.

== Design ==
The RD-0110 was created in a period when KBKhA had just started to design rocket engines. After many studies, simplicity and reliability were the main drivers of the design. For this reason a single shaft integrating the LOX pump, the RG-1 pump and the turbine was chosen. To provide acceptable suction performance, the RD-0110 turbopump has a dual inlet design with back to back centrifugal impellers. This allows it to work at relatively low inlet pressures without requiring additional booster pumps. The turbine is driven by a fuel rich gas generator. The ignition system for both the gas generator and the combustion chamber is done by pyrotechnic devices. The engine control is handled by a regulator, a throttle and a set of valves. It can throttle between 100% and 90.5%, with the option of 107% for a short time in emergencies.

During development, combustion instability issues were observed. The problem was found to be intimately related to the injection system design. It was finally solved by developing an optimized bi-propellant centrifugal atomizer design. During certification testing, high frequency combustion instabilities at start up were still observed. Even though the start instabilities were relatively rare at 1 in 60 to 80, and only on acceptance bench, great effort was made to eliminate the issue. Thanks to acoustic studies and modelling, a solution was found. Six combustible longitudinal felt ribs were placed at the inner surface of the combustion chamber and this solved the issue permanently.

The RD-0110 uses fuel as coolant for the regenerative cooling system. As most other Soviet designs, it uses a corrugated metal construction for the cooling jackets. The thrust chamber and upper nozzle sections has the corrugated metal sandwiched between an inner and outer metal layers. The lower section of the nozzle has no external lining, exposing the corrugated jacket to save weight. All these sections use steel for construction. Given the extreme temperatures at the throat section, this part is made of copper alloy with milled channels and an external lining. A separate film cooling system is implemented though a different manifold and is injected though a circular slot upstream of the throat.

== Production ==
The RD-0107/0108/0110 engines are produced in the Voronezh Mechanical Plant.

== Versions ==
Modifications to the RD-0107 design have led to production of four distinct versions of the engine:

- RD-0107 (GRAU index: 8D715K), also known as RD-461 or RO-8. Used on unmanned Voskhod rockets.
- RD-0108 (GRAU index: 8D715P), also known as RD-461 or RO-8. Used on the two manned Voskhod launches and the first six Molniya-M rockets.
- RD-0110 (GRAU index: 11D55), also known as RD-461. Used on the Soyuz/L/U/U2/FG/2.1a and almost all Molniya-M rockets.
- RD-0110R (GRAU index: 14D24), a heavily modified version of the engine used as vernier thrusters on the first stage of the Soyuz 2.1v rocket.

== See also ==
- Molniya-M – The first LV to use the RD-0110.
- Soyuz rocket family – The most flown LV.
- KBKhA – The RD-0110 designer bureau.
- Voronezh Mechanical Plant – A space hardware manufacturer company that manufactures the RD-0110.
- RD-0110R - version of the engine modified for first stage use
