= UR-200 =

UR-200 SS-10 Scrag
- Type: Intercontinental ballistic missile
- Place of origin: Soviet Union

Service history
- In service: 1963-1964

Production history
- Designer: OKB-52
- Designed: 1962

Specifications (8K81)
- Mass: 135,710 kg (299,190 lb)
- Height: 34.65 m (113.7 ft)
- Diameter: 3 m (9.8 ft)
- Wingspan: 4.2 m (14 ft)
- Warhead: Nuclear warhead
- Engine: First stage, RD-0202 liquid-fuel rocket Second stage, RD-0205 liquid-fuel rocket First stage, 2,236 kN (503,000 lbf); Second stage, 606.4 kN (136,300 lbf)
- Propellant: N_{2}O_{4} / UDMH
- Operational range: 12,000 kilometres (7,500 mi)
- Flight ceiling: 185 km (115 mi) apogee
- Maximum speed: Mach 20 (24,500 km/h; 15,200 mph; 6.81 km/s)
- Guidance system: Inertial

The UR-200 was an intercontinental ballistic missile (ICBM) developed by Vladimir Chelomey's OKB-52 in the Soviet Union. It was known during the Cold War by the NATO reporting name SS-10 Scrag and internally by the GRAU index 8K81. The design was authorized by the Decisions of the Central Committee of the CPSU of March 16 and August 1, 1961, and the draft project was finished in July 1962. It first flew on November 4, 1963, from the Baikonur Cosmodrome. The ninth and final flight was conducted on October 20, 1964.

== Description ==
The UR-200 was a two-stage liquid-propellant universal ICBM for delivery of replaceable payloads to the range up to 12000 km, launch of interceptor satellites for space defense, naval recon satellites, and orbital maneuvering warheads. It was capable of carrying around 3,175 kilograms (7,000 lb) of payload, and could be launched from flat pads, or missile silos built for the R-16 missile. Unusually for a Soviet missile, the first stage provided attitude control by means of thrust vectoring. Nitrogen tetroxide and UDMH were used as propellants.

== FOBS ==
The FOBS, or Fractional Orbital Bombardment System, was a Soviet programme to place a nuclear warhead into a 150 km low Earth orbit, in order to allow the warhead to approach the enemy from any direction, below missile tracking radar systems. The UR-200 was one of several rockets proposed for this purpose, along with the 8K713 and R-36. The use of the UR-200 for FOBS deployment was cancelled in October 1964, when Nikita Khrushchev was removed from power.

== Operational history ==
The UR-200 was never deployed operationally. The successful development of the storable hypergolic-fuelled R-36 silo-launched missile led to the cancellation of the UR-200 in 1965.

== Operators ==
- Soviet Union

== Related developments ==
- R-9 Desna by Sergei Korolev
- R-16 by Mikhail Yangel
- Universal Rocket
- UR-100 "minor" missile in development set of UR-100..UR-200..UR-500 line
- UR-500 "major" missile in development set of UR-100..UR-200..UR-500 line

== See also ==
- List of missiles
- List of orbital launch systems
