= 2030s in spaceflight =

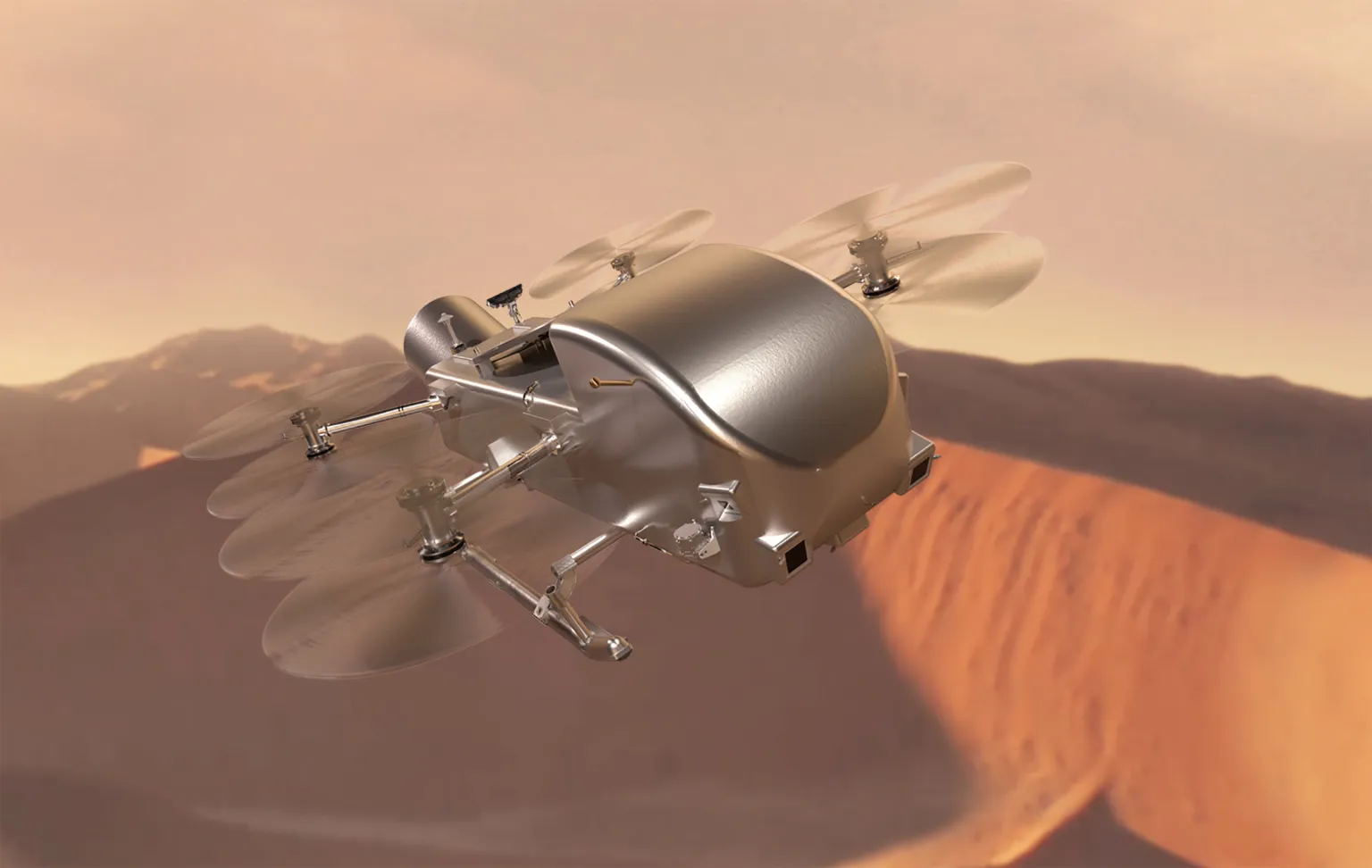
- Dragonfly is expected to reach Titan in 2034.

This article documents expected notable spaceflight events during the 2030s.

== Orbital launches ==
=== 2030 ===
| Date and time (UTC) | Rocket | Flight number | Launch site | | LSP | |
| Date and time (UTC) | Payload (⚀ = CubeSat) | Operator | Orbit | Function | Decay (UTC) | Outcome |
| Date and time (UTC) | Remarks | | | | | |
|---|---|---|---|---|---|---|
| April (TBD) | (Russia) Angara A5M / DM-03 | | (Russia) Vostochny Site 1A | | (Russia) Roscosmos | |
| April (TBD) | (Russia) Ekspress-AT3 | RSCC | Geosynchronous | Communications | | |
| April (TBD) | (Russia) Ekspress-AT4 | RSCC | Geosynchronous | Communications | | |
| November (TBD) | TBA | | TBA | | TBA | |
| November (TBD) | (United States) (Europe) Sentinel-6 NG A (Sentinel-6C) | NASA / NOAA / EUMETSAT / ESA | Low Earth | Earth observation | | |
| November (TBD) | Sentinel-6 Next Generation satellite. | | | | | |
| 2030 (TBD) | (Russia) Angara A5 / DM-03 | | (Russia) Vostochny Site 1A | | (Russia) Roscosmos | |
| 2030 (TBD) | (Russia) Ekspress-AMU8 | RSCC | Geosynchronous | Communications | | |
| 2030 (TBD) | (Russia) Angara A5 | | (Russia) Vostochny Site 1A | | (Russia) Roscosmos | |
| 2030 (TBD) | (Russia) Luna 27B | Roscosmos | TLI to lunar surface | Lunar lander | | |
| 2030 (TBD) | Fourth Luna-Glob mission, landing near the lunar north pole. | | | | | |
| 2030 (TBD) | (Russia) Angara A5P | | (Russia) Vostochny Site 1A | | (Russia) Roscosmos | |
| 2030 (TBD) | (Russia) Orel | Roscosmos | Low Earth | Crewed flight test | | |
| 2030 (TBD) | (Russia) Angara A5V | | (Russia) Vostochny Site 1A | | (Russia) Roscosmos | |
| 2030 (TBD) | (Russia) Dummy payload | Roscosmos | Low Earth | Flight test | | |
| 2030 (TBD) | First flight of the Angara-A5V variant. | | | | | |
| NET 2030 | (Russia) Angara A5 | | (Russia) TBA | | (Russia) Roscosmos | |
| NET 2030 | (Russia) TEM prototype | Roscosmos | Low Earth | Technology demonstration | | |
| 2030 (TBD) | (Europe) Ariane 62 | | (France) Kourou ELA-4 | | (France) Arianespace | |
| 2030 (TBD) | (Europe) NEOMIR | ESA | Sun–Earth L_{1} | Near-Earth object detection Infrared astronomy | | |
| 2030 (TBD) | Near-Earth Object Mission in the InfraRed (NEOMIR). | | | | | |
| 2030 (TBD) | (Europe) Ariane 64 | | (France) Kourou ELA-4 | | (France) Arianespace | |
| 2030 (TBD) | (Europe) Earth Return Orbiter (ERO) | ESA | Areocentric | Mars sample-return | | |
| 2030 (TBD) | Orbiter component of the NASA-ESA Mars Sample Return. It will collect the sample return canister delivered into orbit by the Mars Ascent Vehicle and carry it back to Earth. | | | | | |
| 2030 (TBD) | (United States) Falcon Heavy | | (United States) Kennedy LC-39A | | (United States) SpaceX | |
| 2030 (TBD) | (United States) ISS Deorbit Vehicle | NASA | LEO (ISS) | ISS deorbit | | |
| 2030 (TBD) | Modified Cargo Dragon to deorbit the ISS after it is decommissioned. | | | | | |
| JFY2030 (TBD) | (Japan) H3 | | (Japan) Tanegashima LA-Y2 | | (Japan) MHI | |
| JFY2030 (TBD) | (Japan) IGS-Radar Diversification 2 | CSICE | Low Earth (SSO) | Reconnaissance | | |
| 2030 (TBD) | (South Korea) KSLV-III | TF1 | (South Korea) Naro | | (South Korea) KARI | |
| 2030 (TBD) | (South Korea) | KARI | Low Earth | Flight test | | |
| 2030 (TBD) | Maiden flight of KSLV-III. | | | | | |
| 2030 (TBD) | (China) Long March TBD | | (China) Wenchang | | (China) CASC | |
| 2030 (TBD) | (China) WCOM | CNSA | TBA | TBA | | |
| 2030 (TBD) | (China) Long March TBD | | (China) TBA | | (China) CASC | |
| 2030 (TBD) | (China) Fengyun 4F | CMA | Geosynchronous | Meteorology | | |
| 2030 (TBD) | (China) Long March 5 | | (China) Wenchang LC-1 | | (China) CASC | |
| 2030 (TBD) | (China) Tianwen-3 lander | CNSA | TMI to Martian surface | Mars sample-return | | |
| 2030 (TBD) | (China) Tianwen-3 ascent vehicle | CNSA | TMI to Martian surface | Mars sample-return | | |
| 2030 (TBD) | Chinese Mars sample-return mission. | | | | | |
| 2030 (TBD) | (China) Long March 5 | | (China) Wenchang LC-1 | | (China) CASC | |
| 2030 (TBD) | (China) Tianwen-3 orbiter | CNSA | Areocentric | Mars sample-return | | |
| 2030 (TBD) | (China) Tianwen-3 reentry capsule | CNSA | Areocentric | Mars sample-return | | |
| 2030 (TBD) | Chinese Mars sample-return mission. | | | | | |
| 2030 (TBD) | (China) Long March 10 | | (China) Wenchang | | (China) CASC | |
| 2030 (TBD) | (China) Mengzhou | CNSA | Selenocentric | Crewed lunar landing | | |
| 2030 (TBD) | Delivery of the Mengzhou next-generation crewed spacecraft for China's first crewed lunar landing. | | | | | |
| 2030 (TBD) | (China) Long March 10 | | (China) Wenchang | | (China) CASC | |
| 2030 (TBD) | (China) Lanyue | CNSA | Selenocentric | Crewed lunar landing | | |
| 2030 (TBD) | Delivery of the Lanyue lunar lander for China's first crewed lunar landing. | | | | | |
| 2030 (TBD) | (India) LVM3 | | (India) Satish Dhawan SLP | | (India) ISRO | |
| 2030 (TBD) | (India) Bharatiya Antariksha Station-B2 | ISRO | Low Earth (BAS) | Space station module | | |
| NET 2030 | (Russia) Proton-M / Briz-M | | (Kazakhstan) Baikonur | | (Russia) Roscosmos | |
| NET 2030 | (Russia) Gamma-400 | Roscosmos | Highly elliptical | Gamma-ray astronomy | | |
| 2030 (TBD) | (Taiwan) Siraya | | TBA | | (Taiwan) TASA | |
| 2030 (TBD) | (Taiwan) | TASA | Low Earth | Flight test | | |
| 2030 (TBD) | Maiden flight of Taiwan's first orbital launch vehicle, Siraya (西拉雅). | | | | | |
| 2030 (TBD) | (Russia) Soyuz-2.1a / Fregat-M | | (Russia) Vostochny Site 1S | | (Russia) Roscosmos | |
| 2030 (TBD) | (Russia) Kondor-FKA №4 | Ministry of Defence | Low Earth | Reconnaissance | | |
| 2030 (TBD) | (Russia) Soyuz-2.1a / Fregat | | (Russia) Vostochny Site 1S | | (Russia) Roscosmos | |
| 2030 (TBD) | (Russia) (Belarus) RBKA №2 | Roscosmos / Belarus | Low Earth | Earth observation | | |
| 2030 (TBD) | RBKA will follow in the footsteps of BKA (Belarusian Satellite) launched along with Kanopus-V 1 and several other satellites in July 2012. | | | | | |
| 2030 (TBD) | (Russia) Soyuz-2.1b / Fregat-M | | (Kazakhstan) Baikonur Site 31/6 | | (Russia) Roscosmos | |
| 2030 (TBD) | (Russia) Airlock Module | Roscosmos | Low Earth (ISS) | Space station module | | |
| 2030 (TBD) | The Gateway or Airlock Module (ShM) will be a core module of the Russian Orbital Station (ROS). | | | | | |
| 2030 (TBD) | (Russia) Soyuz-2.1b / Fregat-M | | (Russia) Plesetsk Site 43 | | (Russia) RVSN RF | |
| 2030 (TBD) | (Russia) Kosmos (GLONASS-K2 34L (K2 №13)) | VKS | Medium Earth | Navigation | | |
| 2030 (TBD) | (Russia) Soyuz-2.1b / Fregat-M | | (Russia) Plesetsk Site 43 | | (Russia) RVSN RF | |
| 2030 (TBD) | (Russia) Kosmos (GLONASS-K2 35L (K2 №14)) | VKS | Medium Earth | Navigation | | |
| 2030 (TBD) | (Russia) Soyuz-2.1b / Fregat-M | | (Russia) Plesetsk Site 43 | | (Russia) RVSN RF | |
| 2030 (TBD) | (Russia) Kosmos (GLONASS-K2 36L (K2 №15)) | VKS | Medium Earth | Navigation | | |
| 2030 (TBD) | (Italy) Vega-C | | (France) Kourou ELV | | (France) Arianespace | |
| 2030 (TBD) | CHIME-B (Sentinel-10) | ESA | Low Earth (SSO) | Earth observation | | |
| 2030 (TBD) | Part of the European Space Agency's Copernicus Programme. | | | | | |
| 2030 (TBD) | (Russia) TBA | | TBA | | (Russia) Roscosmos | |
| 2030 (TBD) | (Russia) Bion-M №3 | IMBP / RAS | Low Earth | Biological science | | |
| 2030 (TBD) | (United States) TBA | | (United States) TBA | | (United States) TBA | |
| 2030 (TBD) | (United States) UVEX | NASA | Highly elliptical | Ultraviolet astronomy | | |
| 2030 (TBD) | Ultraviolet Explorer (UVEX). | | | | | |

=== 2031 ===
| Date and time (UTC) | Rocket | Flight number | Launch site | | LSP | |
| Date and time (UTC) | Payload (⚀ = CubeSat) | Operator | Orbit | Function | Decay (UTC) | Outcome |
| Date and time (UTC) | Remarks | | | | | |
|---|---|---|---|---|---|---|
| June (TBD) | (United States) TBA | | (United States) TBA | | (United States) TBA | |
| June (TBD) | (United States) VERITAS | NASA | Cytherocentric | Venus orbiter | | |
| June (TBD) | NASA Discovery Program mission to Venus. | | | | | |
| November (TBD) | (France) Ariane 64 | | (France) Kourou ELA-4 | | (France) Arianespace | |
| November (TBD) | EnVision | ESA | Cytherocentric | Venus orbiter | | |
| 2031 (TBD) | (France) Ariane 62 | | (France) Kourou ELA-4 | | (France) Arianespace | |
| 2031 (TBD) | ARIEL | ESA | Sun–Earth L_{2} | Exoplanetary science | | |
| Q3 (TBD) | (Europe) Vega-C | | (France) Kourou ELV | | (France) Arianespace | |
| Q3 (TBD) | (Europe) CIMR B (Sentinel-11B) | ESA | Low Earth (SSO) | Oceanography | | |
| Q3 (TBD) | Second of two satellites for the Copernicus Imaging Microwave Radiometer (CIMR) mission. Part of the European Space Agency's Copernicus Programme. | | | | | |
| 2031 (TBD) | (Russia) Angara A5M / DM-03 | | (Russia) Vostochny Site 1A | | (Russia) Roscosmos | |
| 2031 (TBD) | (Russia) Spektr-UV (WSO-UV) | INASAN | IGSO | Ultraviolet astronomy | | |
| 2031 (TBD) | (Europe) Ariane 64 | | (France) Kourou ELA-4 | | (France) Arianespace | |
| 2031 (TBD) | (Europe) Argonaut Mission 1 | ESA | Selenocentric to lunar surface | Lunar lander | | |
| 2031 (TBD) | First flight of Argonaut, also known as the European Large Logistics Lander (EL3). | | | | | |
| 2031 (TBD) | (Europe) Ariane 6 | | (France) Kourou ELA-4 | | (France) Arianespace | |
| 2031 (TBD) | (Europe) Vigil | ESA | Sun–Earth L_{5} | Space weather | | |
| JFY2031 (TBD) | (Japan) Epsilon S | | (Japan) Uchinoura | | (Japan) JAXA | |
| JFY2031 (TBD) | (Japan) Innovative Satellite Technology Demonstration-7 | JAXA | Low Earth | Technology demonstration | | |
| JFY2031 (TBD) | Part of JAXA's Innovative Satellite Technology Demonstration Program. | | | | | |
| JFY2031 (TBD) | (Japan) Epsilon S | | (Japan) Uchinoura | | (Japan) JAXA | |
| JFY2031 (TBD) | (Japan) JASMINE | JAXA / NAOJ | Low Earth (SSO) | Astrometric observatory | | |
| JFY2031 (TBD) | (Japan) H3 | | (Japan) Tanegashima LA-Y2 | | (Japan) MHI | |
| JFY2031 (TBD) | (Japan) IGS-Radar 9 | CSICE | Low Earth (SSO) | Reconnaissance | | |
| 2031 (TBD) | (India) NGLV | D1 | (India) Satish Dhawan TLP | | (India) ISRO | |
| 2031 (TBD) | (India) | ISRO | Low Earth | Flight test | | |
| 2031 (TBD) | Maiden flight of ISRO's Next Generation Launch Vehicle (NGLV), codenamed Soorya. | | | | | |
| 2031 (TBD) | (Russia) Soyuz-2.1a / Fregat | | (Kazakhstan) Baikonur | | (Russia) Roscosmos | |
| 2031 (TBD) | (Russia) Rezonans-MKA | Roscosmos | Tundra | Magnetospheric research | | |
| 2031–2032 (TBD) | (United States) TBA | | (United States) TBA | | (United States) TBA | |
| 2031–2032 (TBD) | (United States) DAVINCI | NASA | Cytherocentric | Venus atmospheric probe | | |
| 2031–2032 (TBD) | NASA Discovery Program mission to Venus. | | | | | |
| 2031 (TBD) | (United States) Commercial launch vehicle | | (United States) Cape Canaveral or Kennedy | | (United States) TBA | |
| 2031 (TBD) | (United States) (Europe) Sample Retrieval Lander | NASA / ESA | TMI to Martian surface | Mars sample-return | | |
| 2031 (TBD) | (United States) Mars Ascent Vehicle | NASA | Martian surface to TMI | Mars sample-return | | |
| 2031 (TBD) | Lander component of the NASA–ESA Mars sample-return mission. It will carry NASA's Mars Ascent Vehicle. | | | | | |
| 2031-32 (TBD) | (India) LVM3-SC | | (India) Satish Dhawan SLP | | (India) ISRO | |
| 2031-32 (TBD) | (India) Lunar Navcom × 3 | ISRO | Selenocentric | Communications; Navigation | | |
| 2031-32 (TBD) | First of Two launches carrying 3 satellites for Lunar Navcom Data Relay and Navigation satellite. | | | | | |
| 2031-32 (TBD) | (India) LVM3-SC | | (India) Satish Dhawan SLP | | (India) ISRO | |
| 2031-32 (TBD) | (India) Lunar Navcom × 3 | ISRO | Selenocentric | Communications; Navigation | | |
| 2031-32 (TBD) | Second of Two launches carrying 3 satellites for Lunar Navcom Data Relay and Navigation satellite. | | | | | |

=== 2032 ===
| Date and time (UTC) | Rocket | Flight number | Launch site | | LSP | |
| Date and time (UTC) | Payload (⚀ = CubeSat) | Operator | Orbit | Function | Decay (UTC) | Outcome |
| Date and time (UTC) | Remarks | | | | | |
|---|---|---|---|---|---|---|
| Q2 (TBD) | (Europe) Ariane 6 | | (France) Kourou ELA-4 | | (France) Arianespace | |
| Q2 (TBD) | (Europe) MetOp-SG A2 | EUMETSAT | Low Earth (SSO) | Meteorology | | |
| 2032 (TBD) | (Russia) Angara A5 | | (Russia) Vostochny Site 1A | | (Russia) Roscosmos | |
| 2032 (TBD) | (Russia) Luna 29 | Roscosmos | Selenocentric | Lunar orbiter | | |
| 2032 (TBD) | Luna-Glob mission. | | | | | |
| 2032 (TBD) | (India) NGLV | D2 | (India) Satish Dhawan TLP | | (India) ISRO | |
| 2032 (TBD) | (India) | ISRO | Low Earth | Flight test | | |
| 2032 (TBD) | (India) NGLV | D3 | (India) Satish Dhawan TLP | | (India) ISRO | |
| 2032 (TBD) | (India) | ISRO | Low Earth | Flight test | | |
| 2032 (TBD) | The NGLV First Stage Booster is planned to be recovered in this Mission. | | | | | |
| JFY2032 (TBD) | (Japan) H3 | | (Japan) Tanegashima LA-Y2 | | (Japan) MHI | |
| JFY2032 (TBD) | (Japan) IGS-Optical Diversification Successor | CSICE | Low Earth (SSO) | Reconnaissance | | |
| 2032 (TBD) | (Japan) H3 | | (Japan) Tanegashima LA-Y2 | | (Japan) MHI | |
| 2032 (TBD) | (Japan) LiteBIRD | JAXA | Sun–Earth L_{2} | Space observatory | | |
| 2032 (TBD) | (India) LVM3-SC | | (India) Satish Dhawan SLP | | (India) ISRO | |
| 2032 (TBD) | (India) Bharatiya Antariksha Station-B5 | ISRO | Low Earth (BAS) | Space station module | | |
| 2032 (TBD) | (South Korea) KSLV-III | F3 | (South Korea) Naro | | (South Korea) KARI | |
| 2032 (TBD) | (South Korea) KLLR Lander | KARI | Selenocentric to lunar surface | Lunar lander | | |
| 2032 (TBD) | (South Korea) KLLR Rover | KARI | Selenocentric to lunar surface | Lunar rover | | |
| 2032 (TBD) | Launch of the first South Korean lunar lander. | | | | | |
| 2032 (TBD) | (China) Long March TBD | | (China) TBA | | (China) CASC | |
| 2032 (TBD) | (China) Xihe-3 | CNSA | TBA | Solar observatory | | |
| 2032 (TBD) | (Russia) Angara A5M / KVTK | | (Russia) Vostochny Site 1A | | (Russia) Roscosmos | |
| 2032 (TBD) | (Russia) Elektro-M №1-1 | Roscosmos | Geosynchronous | Meteorology | | |
| 2032 (TBD) | (Russia) Soyuz-2.1b / Fregat-M | | (Russia) Vostochny Site 1S | | (Russia) Roscosmos | |
| 2032 (TBD) | (Russia) Meteor-MP №1 | Roscosmos | Low Earth | Meteorology | | |
| 2032 (TBD) | (Russia) Soyuz-2.1b / Fregat | | (Russia) Vostochny Site 1S | | (Russia) Roscosmos | |
| 2032 (TBD) | (Russia) Ionosfera-M-OP №1 | Roscosmos | Low Earth (SSO) | Ionospheric research | | |
| 2032 (TBD) | (United States) Starship | | (United States) TBA | | (United States) SpaceX | |
| 2032 (TBD) | (Japan) (United States) Lunar Cruiser | JAXA / Toyota / NASA | Selenocentric to lunar surface | Crewed lunar rover | | |
| 2032 (TBD) | Crewed pressurized rover for Artemis 7 and later missions. | | | | | |
| 2032 (TBD) | (United States) TBA | | (United States) TBA | | (United States) TBA | |
| 2032 (TBD) | (United States) GeoXO-1 | NOAA | Geosynchronous | Meteorology | | |
| 2032 (TBD) | (United States) TBA | | (United States) TBA | | (United States) TBA | |
| 2032 (TBD) | (United States) JPSS-3 | NOAA | Low Earth (SSO) | Meteorology | | |
| 2032 (TBD) | (Russia) Yenisei | | (Russia) Vostochny PU3 | | (Russia) Roscosmos | |
| 2032 (TBD) | (Russia) | | Low Earth | Flight test | | |
| 2032 (TBD) | First flight of the Yenisei super heavy-lift launch vehicle. | | | | | |

=== 2033 ===
| Date and time (UTC) | Rocket | Flight number | Launch site | | LSP | |
| Date and time (UTC) | Payload (⚀ = CubeSat) | Operator | Orbit | Function | Decay (UTC) | Outcome |
| Date and time (UTC) | Remarks | | | | | |
|---|---|---|---|---|---|---|
| Q1 (TBD) | (Europe) Ariane 6 | | (France) Kourou ELA-4 | | (France) Arianespace | |
| Q1 (TBD) | (Europe) MetOp-SG B2 | EUMETSAT | Low Earth (SSO) | Meteorology | | |
| Q3 (TBD) | TBA | | TBA | | TBA | |
| Q3 (TBD) | (Europe) Sentinel-3 NG TOPO A | ESA | Low Earth (SSO) | Earth observation | | |
| Q3 (TBD) | Sentinel-3 Next Generation Topography satellite. | | | | | |
| Q4 (TBD) | TBA | | TBA | | TBA | |
| Q4 (TBD) | (United States) (Europe) Sentinel-6 NG B (Sentinel-6D) | NASA / NOAA / EUMETSAT / ESA | Low Earth | Earth observation | | |
| Q4 (TBD) | Sentinel-6 Next Generation satellite. | | | | | |
| 2033 (TBD) | (Europe) Ariane 6 | | (France) Kourou ELA-4 | | (France) Arianespace | |
| 2033 (TBD) | (Europe) MTG-I3 | EUMETSAT | Geosynchronous | Meteorology | | |
| 2033 (TBD) | (India) LVM3-SC | | (India) Satish Dhawan SLP | | (India) ISRO | |
| 2033 (TBD) | (India) Bharatiya Antariksha Station-B3 | ISRO | Low Earth (BAS) | Space station module | | |
| JFY2033 (TBD) | (Japan) H3 | | (Japan) Tanegashima LA-Y2 | | (Japan) MHI | |
| JFY2033 (TBD) | (Japan) IGS-Radar 10 | CSICE | Low Earth (SSO) | Reconnaissance | | |
| JFY2033 (TBD) | (Japan) H3 | | (Japan) Tanegashima LA-Y2 | | (Japan) MHI | |
| JFY2033 (TBD) | (Japan) IGS-Optical 11 | CSICE | Low Earth (SSO) | Reconnaissance | | |
| 2033 (TBD) | (China) Long March 9 | | (China) Wenchang | | (China) CASC | |
| 2033 (TBD) | (China) | CNSA | Low Earth | Flight test | | |
| 2033 (TBD) | First flight of the Long March 9 super heavy-lift launch vehicle. | | | | | |
| 2033 (TBD) | (China) Long March TBD | | (China) TBA | | (China) CASC | |
| 2033 (TBD) | (China) Fengyun 4G | CMA | Geosynchronous | Meteorology | | |
| 2033 (TBD) | (United States) New Glenn | | (United States) Cape Canaveral LC-36 | | (United States) Blue Origin | |
| 2033 (TBD) | (United States) Foundational Surface Habitat | NASA | Selenocentric to lunar surface | Lunar surface habitat | | |
| 2033 (TBD) | The Foundational Surface Habitat will be the first component of the Artemis Base Camp lunar outpost. | | | | | |
| 2033-34 (TBD) | (India) LMLV | | (India) Satish Dhawan TLP | | (India) ISRO | |
| 2033-34 (TBD) | (India) Chandrayaan-6 | ISRO | Low Earth to Selenocentric | TBA | | |
| 2033-34 (TBD) | Landing of same lander as the crewed lunar descent stage. | | | | | |

=== 2034 ===
| Date and time (UTC) | Rocket | Flight number | Launch site | | LSP | |
| Date and time (UTC) | Payload (⚀ = CubeSat) | Operator | Orbit | Function | Decay (UTC) | Outcome |
| Date and time (UTC) | Remarks | | | | | |
|---|---|---|---|---|---|---|
| 2034 (TBD) | (Russia) Angara A5 / DM-03 | | (Russia) Vostochny Site 1A | | (Russia) Roscosmos | |
| 2034 (TBD) | (Russia) Luna 28 | Roscosmos | Selenocentric | Lunar lander Lunar sample return | | |
| 2034 (TBD) | Luna-Glob sample return mission. | | | | | |
| 2034 (TBD) | (China) Long March TBD | | (China) Wenchang | | (China) CASC | |
| 2034 (TBD) | (China) Tianwen-5 | CNSA | Heliocentric | TBA | | |
| 2034 (TBD) | (India) LVM3-SC | | (India) Satish Dhawan SLP | | (India) ISRO | |
| 2034 (TBD) | (India) Bharatiya Antariksha Station-B4 | ISRO | Low Earth (BAS) | Space station module | | |
| Q3 2034 | TBA | | TBA | | TBA | |
| Q3 2034 | (Europe) Sentinel-3 NG OPT A | ESA | Low Earth (SSO) | Earth observation | | |
| Q3 2034 | Sentinel-3 Next Generation Optical satellite. | | | | | |

=== 2035 ===
| Date and time (UTC) | Rocket | Flight number | Launch site | | LSP | |
| Date and time (UTC) | Payload (⚀ = CubeSat) | Operator | Orbit | Function | Decay (UTC) | Outcome |
| Date and time (UTC) | Remarks | | | | | |
|---|---|---|---|---|---|---|
| H1 2035 | (Europe) Ariane 6 | | (France) Kourou ELA-4 | | (France) Arianespace | |
| H1 2035 | (Europe) MTG-S2 / Sentinel-4B | EUMETSAT | Geosynchronous | Meteorology / Earth observation | | |
| Q3 2035 | TBA | | TBA | | TBA | |
| Q3 2035 | (Europe) Sentinel-3 NG TOPO B | ESA | Low Earth (SSO) | Earth observation | | |
| Q3 2035 | Sentinel-3 Next Generation Topography satellite. | | | | | |
| 2035 (TBD) | (Russia) Angara A5V | | (Russia) Vostochny Site 1A | | (Russia) Roscosmos | |
| 2035 (TBD) | (Russia) Spektr-M (Millimetron) | Russian Astro Space Center | Sun–Earth L_{2} | Submillimetre / Far-IR astronomy | | |
| 2035 (TBD) | (Europe) Ariane 64 | | (France) Kourou ELA-4 | | (France) Arianespace | |
| 2035 (TBD) | (Europe) Athena | ESA | Sun–Earth L_{2}, Halo orbit | X-ray astronomy | | |
| 2035 (TBD) | (Europe) Ariane 6 | | (France) Kourou ELA-4 | | (France) Arianespace | |
| 2035 (TBD) | (Europe) LISA-1 | ESA | Heliocentric | Gravitational-wave observatory | | |
| 2035 (TBD) | (Europe) LISA-2 | ESA | Heliocentric | Gravitational-wave observatory | | |
| 2035 (TBD) | (Europe) LISA-3 | ESA | Heliocentric | Gravitational-wave observatory | | |
| 2035 (TBD) | (Russia) Soyuz-2.1b / Fregat-M | | (Russia) Vostochny Site 1S | | (Russia) Roscosmos | |
| 2035 (TBD) | (Russia) Arktika-MP №1 | Roscosmos | Molniya | Meteorology | | |
| 2035 (TBD) | (United States) TBA | | (United States) TBA | | (United States) TBA | |
| 2035 (TBD) | (United States) GeoXO-2 | NOAA | Geosynchronous | Meteorology | | |
| 2035 (TBD) | (United States) TBA | | (United States) TBA | | (United States) TBA | |
| 2035 (TBD) | (United States) GeoXO-3 | NOAA | Geosynchronous | Meteorology | | |
| 2035 (TBD) | (China) Long March TBD | | (China) Wenchang | | (China) CASC | |
| 2035 (TBD) | (China) Fengyun 5D | CMA | Geosynchronous | Meteorology | | |
| 2035 (TBD) | (China) Long March TBD | | (China) Wenchang | | (China) CASC | |
| 2035 (TBD) | (China) Fengyun 6A | CMA | Geosynchronous | Meteorology | | |

=== 2036 ===
| Date and time (UTC) | Rocket | Flight number | Launch site | | LSP | |
| Date and time (UTC) | Payload (⚀ = CubeSat) | Operator | Orbit | Function | Decay (UTC) | Outcome |
| Date and time (UTC) | Remarks | | | | | |
|---|---|---|---|---|---|---|
| Q3 2036 | TBA | | TBA | | TBA | |
| Q3 2036 | (Europe) Sentinel-3 NG OPT B | ESA | Low Earth (SSO) | Earth observation | | |
| Q3 2036 | Sentinel-3 Next Generation Optical satellite. | | | | | |
| 2036 (TBD) | (Russia) Angara A5 | | (Russia) Vostochny Site 1A | | (Russia) Roscosmos | |
| 2036 (TBD) | (Russia) Luna 30 | Roscosmos | Selenocentric | Lunar lander Lunar rovers | | |
| 2036 (TBD) | Luna-Glob mission. | | | | | |
| 2036 (TBD) | (Russia) Angara A5 / DM-03 | | (Russia) Vostochny Site 1A | | (Russia) Roscosmos | |
| 2036 (TBD) | (Russia) Venera-17 orbiter | Roscosmos | Cytherocentric | Venus orbiter | | |
| 2036 (TBD) | (Russia) Venera-17 lander | Roscosmos | Cytherocentric | Venus lander | | |
| 2036 (TBD) | Venera-17 (Venera-D) Mission. | | | | | |
| 2036-37 (TBD) | (India) LMLV | | (India) Satish Dhawan TLP | | (India) ISRO | |
| 2036-37 (TBD) | (India) Chandrayaan-7 | ISRO | Low Earth to Selenocentric | TBA | | |
| 2036-37 (TBD) | First of two uncrewed end-to-end lunar human landing demonstration. | | | | | |
| 2036-37 (TBD) | (India) LMLV | | (India) Satish Dhawan TLP | | (India) ISRO | |
| 2036-37 (TBD) | (India) Chandrayaan-8 | ISRO | Low Earth to Selenocentric | TBA | | |
| 2036-37 (TBD) | Second of two uncrewed end-to-end lunar human landing demonstration. | | | | | |

=== 2038 ===
| Date and time (UTC) | Rocket | Flight number | Launch site | | LSP | |
| Date and time (UTC) | Payload (⚀ = CubeSat) | Operator | Orbit | Function | Decay (UTC) | Outcome |
| Date and time (UTC) | Remarks | | | | | |
|---|---|---|---|---|---|---|
| 2038-39 (TBD) | (India) LMLV | | (India) Satish Dhawan TLP | | (India) ISRO | |
| 2038-39 (TBD) | (India) Chandrayaan-H1 Crew Module | ISRO | Low Earth to Selenocentric | TBA | | |
| 2038-39 (TBD) | India's first crewed lunar mission, will orbit the moon and return. | | | | | |

=== 2039 and beyond ===
| Date and time (UTC) | Rocket | Flight number | Launch site | | LSP | |
| Date and time (UTC) | Payload (⚀ = CubeSat) | Operator | Orbit | Function | Decay (UTC) | Outcome |
| Date and time (UTC) | Remarks | | | | | |
|---|---|---|---|---|---|---|
| Q2 2039 | (Europe) Ariane 6 | | (France) Kourou ELA-4 | | (France) Arianespace | |
| Q2 2039 | (Europe) MetOp-SG A3 | EUMETSAT | Low Earth (SSO) | Meteorology | | |
| Q1 2040 | (Europe) Ariane 6 | | (France) Kourou ELA-4 | | (France) Arianespace | |
| Q1 2040 | (Europe) MetOp-SG B3 | EUMETSAT | Low Earth (SSO) | Meteorology | | |
| 2040 (TBD) | (India) LMLV | | (India) Satish Dhawan TLP | | (India) ISRO | |
| 2040 (TBD) | (India) Chandrayaan-H2 Earth Departure Stage | ISRO | Low Earth to Selenocentric | TBA | | |
| 2040 (TBD) | First of two launches for Chandrayaan-H2 mission, first Indian crewed landing on the surface of moon. | | | | | |
| 2040 (TBD) | (India) LMLV | | (India) Satish Dhawan TLP | | (India) ISRO | |
| 2040 (TBD) | (India) Chandrayaan-H2 Crew Module | ISRO | Low Earth to Selenocentric | Crewed lunar landing | | |
| 2040 (TBD) | (India) Chandrayaan-H2 Lander Module | ISRO | Low Earth to Selenocentric | Crewed lunar landing | | |
| 2040 (TBD) | Second of two launches for Chandrayaan-H2 mission, first Indian crewed landing on the surface of moon. | | | | | |
| 2040 (TBD) | (Europe) Ariane 6 | | (France) Kourou ELA-4 | | (France) Arianespace | |
| 2040 (TBD) | (Europe) Large Interferometer For Exoplanets | ESA | Heliocentric | Infrared astronomy | | |
| 2043 (TBD) | (Europe) Ariane 6 | | (France) Kourou ELA-4 | | (France) Arianespace | |
| 2043 (TBD) | (Europe) MTG-I4 | EUMETSAT | Geosynchronous | Meteorology | | |

== Deep-space rendezvous ==
| Date (UTC) | Spacecraft | Event | Remarks |
|---|---|---|---|
| 11 April 2030 | Europa Clipper | Jupiter orbit insertion | |
| 26 December 2030 | Lucy | Third gravity assist at Earth | Target altitude 660 km |
| July 2031 | Hayabusa2 | Arrival at asteroid 1998 KY26 | |
| 11 April 2030 | Europa Clipper | First flyby of Europa | |
| July 2031 | JUICE | Flyby of Ganymede | |
| July 2031 | JUICE | Jupiter orbit insertion | |
| July 2032 | JUICE | Flyby of Europa | |
| 16 July 2032 | Europa Clipper & JUICE | Flyby of Europa | Clipper & Juice fly by Europa within 4 hours of each other. |
| 2 March 2033 | Lucy | Flyby of binary asteroid 617 Patroclus-Menoetius | Target altitude 1000 km |
| December 2034 | JUICE | Ganymede orbit insertion | Planned first orbit of a moon other than Earth's |
| 24 January 2035 | Tianwen-2 | Rendezvous with 311P/PanSTARRS | |

- The United Kingdom, Russia, South Korea and China plan to return samples from Mars by around 2031 or 2032.
- A joint NASA/ESA project plans to return samples from Mars by 2033.
- Dragonfly is expected to reach Titan in 2036.
- The Solar Polar Orbit Observatory is planned to have gravity assists off Earth and Jupiter throughout the decade.

== Expected maiden flights ==
- Siraya – TASA – Taiwan
- Amur – Roscosmos – Russia
- Tianwen-3 – CASC – China
- Tronador II-250 – CONAE – Argentina – 2029
- Yenisei – Roscosmos – Russia
- Long March 9 – CASC – China
- Ariel Space Mission – UK Space Agency – United Kingdom
- KSLV-III – KARI – South Korea
- NGLV - ISRO - India
