= Vostochny Airport (disambiguation) =

Vostochny Airport (Russian: Аэропорт Восточный, translated as Eastern Airport) may refer to:

- Kursk Vostochny Airport in Kursk, Russia (IATA: URS, ICAO: UUOK)
- Ulan-Ude Vostochny Airport in Ulan-Ude, Russia
- Ulyanovsk Vostochny Airport in Ulyanovsk, Russia (IATA: ULY, ICAO: UWLW)
- Vitebsk Vostochny Airport in Vitebsk, Belarus (IATA: VTB, ICAO: UMII)
- Vostochny Airport (Amur Oblast) - Airport under construction in Vostochny Cosmodrome
