= Vostochny Airport (Amur Oblast) =

Vostochny Airport Аэропорт Восточный
- IATA: none; ICAO: ZFQ1

Summary
- Airport type: Joint
- Owner: Government of Russia
- Operator: Roscosmos
- Serves: Tsiolokovsky
- Location: Vostochny Cosmodrome, Amur Oblast, Russia
- Coordinates: 51°52′54.7″N 128°5′58″E
- Interactive map of Vostochny Airport

Vostochny Airport (Russian: Аэропорт Восточный) is an airport under construction in Vostochny Cosmodrome, a Russian spaceport located in Amur Oblast which is in the Russian Far East.

== History ==
It is planned to complete the construction and commission the airport in 2029. Its construction is laid down in the Federal Targeted Program for the Development of Spaceports for 2016–2025. It will accept all types of aircraft.

In 2012, Lenaeroproyekt (Russian: Ленаэропроект) began work on the design of an airport complex. The airport will allow to operate all domestic and foreign aircraft without restrictions, provide air traffic requirements not only for the new domestic cosmodrome, but also for various enterprises in the region, and expand passenger transportation capabilities.
