= Tsiolkovsky, Amur Oblast =

Closed town in Amur Oblast, Russia

Tsiolkovsky Циолковский
- Settlement
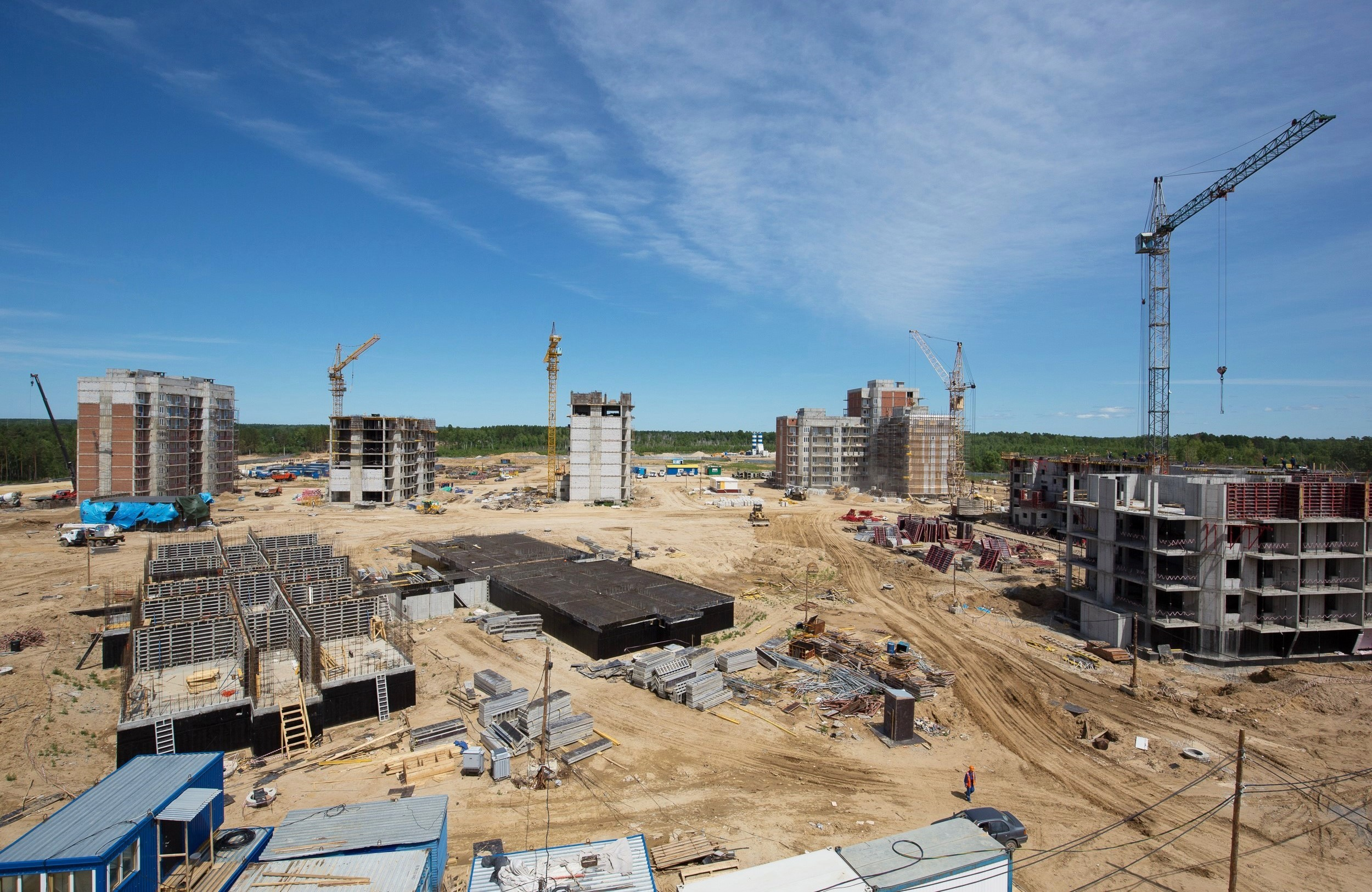
- Construction of residential buildings in summer 2015

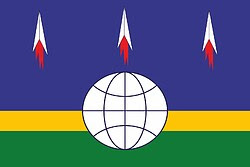
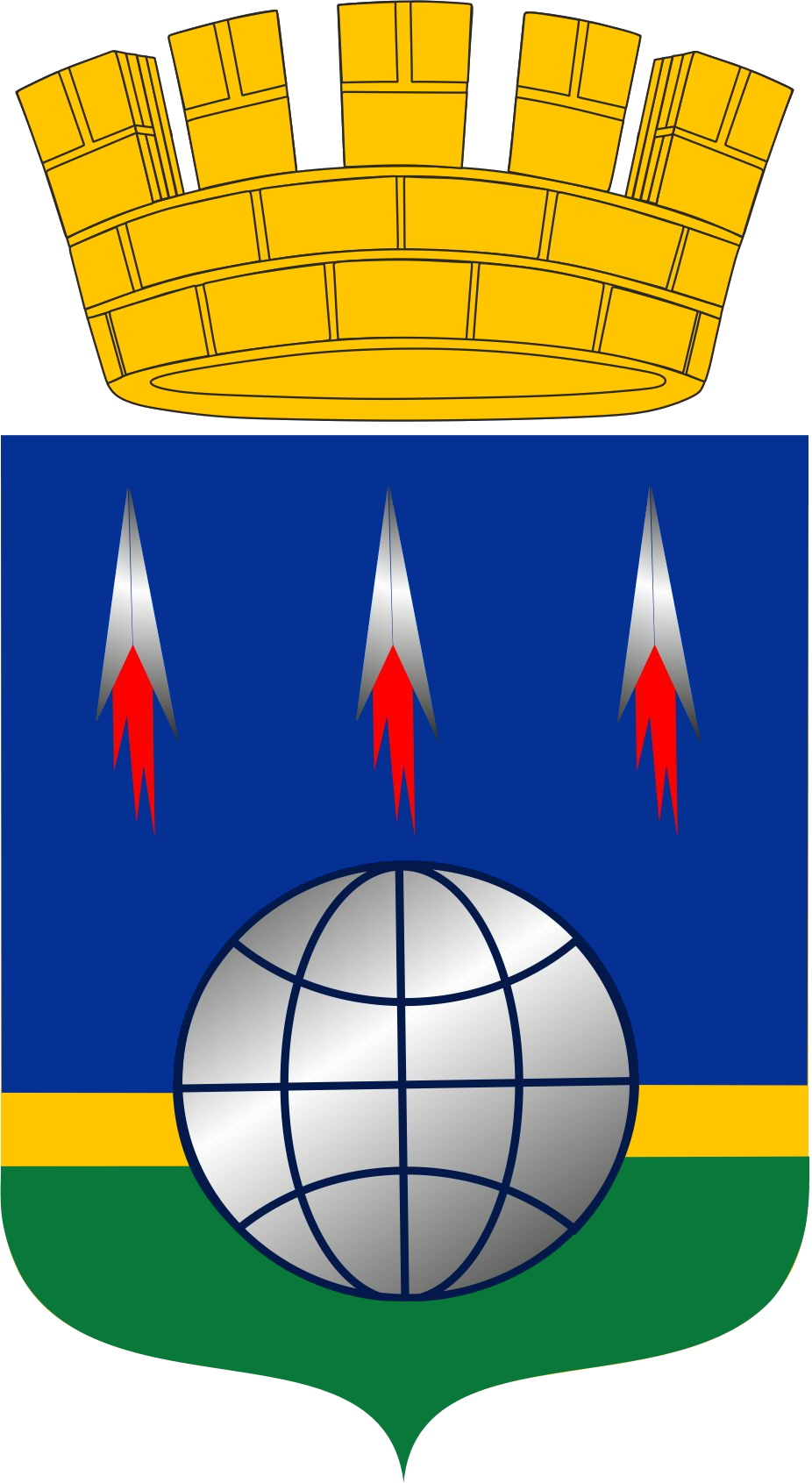
- Flag Coat of arms
- Interactive map of Tsiolkovsky
- Location of Tsiolkovsky Tsiolkovsky (Amur Oblast)
- Coordinates: 51°45′37″N 128°07′16″E
- Country: Russia
- Federal subject: Amur Oblast
- Founded: 1961

Government
  - Body: Council of People's Deputies
  - Head: Marina Zenina

Population (2010 Census)
  - Total: 5,892
  - Estimate (2025): 8,037 (+36.4%)

Administrative status
  - Subordinated to: Tsiolkovsky Urban Okrug
  - Capital of: Tsiolkovsky Urban Okrug

Municipal status
  - Urban okrug: Tsiolkovsky Urban Okrug
  - Capital of: Tsiolkovsky Urban Okrug
- Time zone: UTC+9 (MSK+6)
- Postal code: 676470
- Dialing code: +7 41643
- OKTMO ID: 10770000051
- Rural locality Day: October 27
- Website: затоциолковский.рф

Tsiolkovsky (Russian: Циолковский) is a closed town in Amur Oblast, Russia, located on the Bolshaya Pyora River (a tributary of the Zeya), 110 kilometers (68 mi) from the border with China and 180 kilometers (110 mi) north of Blagoveshchensk, the administrative center of the oblast. Population: 5,892 (2010 census); 5,050 (2002 census). The town serves the nearby spaceport, Vostochny Cosmodrome.

== History ==
The town was founded in 1961. From 1969 to 1994, it was called Uglegorsk and was established in order to serve the nearby ICBM base of the Soviet Armed Forces which was code-named Svobodny-18. The name was given after another settlement called Svobodny which lies 50 kilometers (31 mi) south of it. The closed status was assigned by the Decree of the Presidium of the Supreme Soviet of the RSFSR of October 19, 1965. In 1994 the entire complex was renamed to Uglegorsk (Russian: Углего́рск).

In April 2013, President Vladimir Putin proposed to rename a town nearer to the Cosmodrome in honor of the founder of theoretical astronautics Konstantin Tsiolkovsky. Later it was decided to assign this name to Uglegorsk. In March 2014 the settlement held a public hearing where the majority of participants were in favor of the renaming. In June 2014 the Council of People's Deputies of Uglegorsk approved the name change. In September 2015 the deputies of the Legislative Assembly of Amur Oblast adopted a law to change the status of the settlement of Uglegorsk and transform it into a city without changing the established administrative borders. The official documents to rename the city were sent for examination to the Federal Service for State Registration, Cadastre and Cartography (Rosreestr). On December 23 the State Duma, the lower house of the Russian Parliament voted in favour of a federal law on the renaming of the town, and on December 30 President Putin signed it into law, thus formalizing the name changing.

On November 30, 2015, one of the streets of the town was renamed "3rd street of the Builders" (Russian: 3-я улица Строителей) as a tribute to the creativity of Eldar Ryazanov.

== Administrative and municipal status ==
Within the framework of administrative divisions, it is incorporated as Uglegorsk Urban Okrug—an administrative unit with the status equal to that of the districts. As a municipal division, this administrative unit also has urban okrug status.

== Economy and infrastructure ==
The settlement contains thirty-three blocks of residential homes and a central heating plant. There is a secondary school, a children's arts school, two kindergartens, and a hospital. The settlement has a sports complex. Its construction began in 2005 and was planned to be finished by 2009 but due to lack of funding opening was postponed two years later to 2011.

=== Transportation ===
Ledyanaya railway station serves the town and is located 5 kilometers (3.1 mi) from it on the Trans-Siberian Railway. The Amur Highway (M58) also passes there.

== Vostochny cosmodrome ==
In July 2010, Prime Minister Vladimir Putin announced that the area would be the site of a new Vostochny cosmodrome ("Eastern Spaceport"), to reduce Russian dependence on the Baikonur cosmodrome in Kazakhstan.

On early December 2011, a public debate held in Tsiolkovsky with the participation of officials from the Russian space industry in which the settlement's future in the context of the construction of the new cosmodrome was discussed. It was announced the south-eastern district will be expanded with six-, nine-, and twelve-story buildings designed for the settlement of 12,000 people. The buildings will be built using solid blocks which will be produced in a factory located at Svobodny south of Tsiolkovsky. The south-east neighborhood will be located on 140 acres near the old part of the settlement.
