= Ledyanaya railway station =

Railway station in Amur Oblast, Russia

Ledyanaya Ледяная
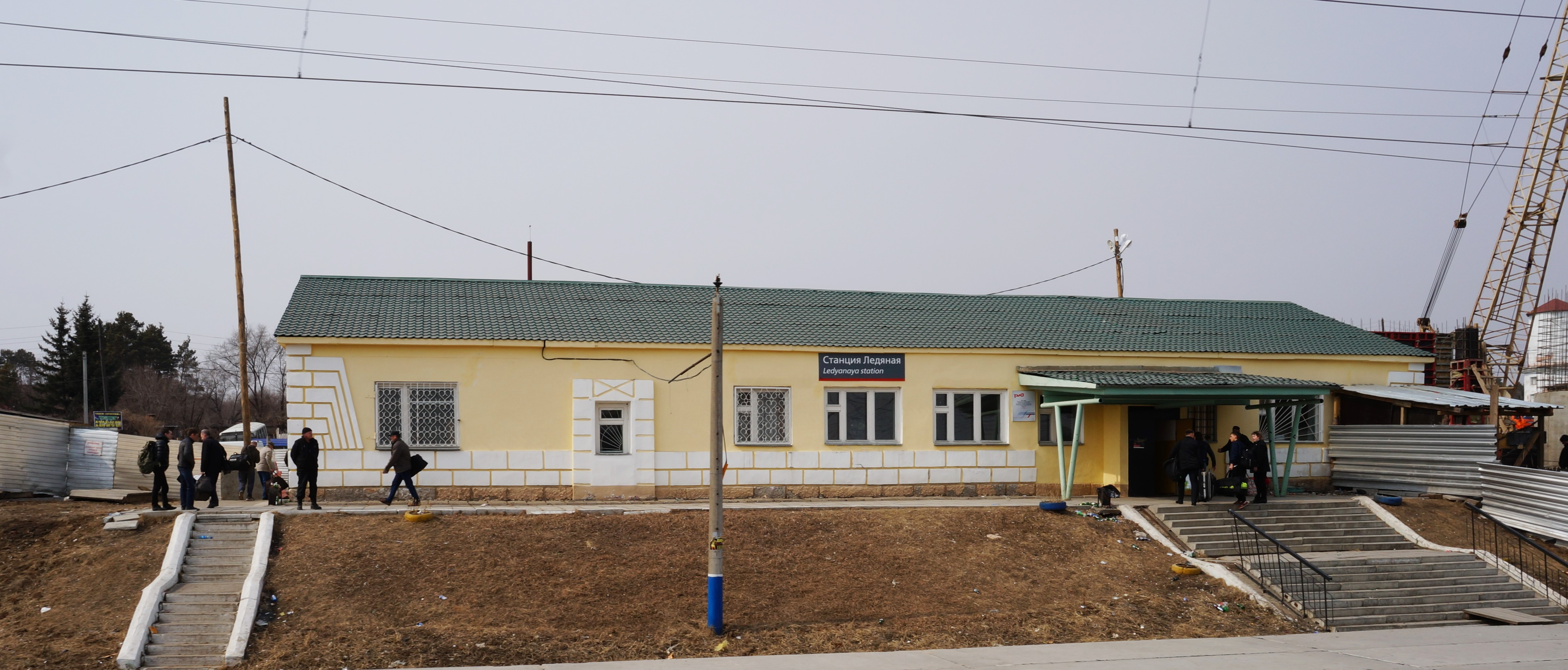

General information
- Location: Svobodnensky District, Amur Oblast, Russia
- Coordinates: 51°44′50.23″N 128°4′15.02″E
- System: Railway station
- Owner: Government of Russia

History
- Opened: 1914
Location

Ledyanaya (Russian: Ледяная) is a railway station on the Trans–Baikal Railway in Svobodnensky District of Amur Oblast, Russia, located near the towns of Tsiolkovsky and Svobodny. The station was open in 1914, but recently has been heavily used to supply the construction and daily functioning of the newly built spaceport, Vostochny Cosmodrome.

Ledyanaya is located on the line connecting Bamovskaya and Belogorsk. There is infrequent passenger traffic.
