= Bolshaya Pera =

Location
- Country: Russia

Physical characteristics
- Mouth: Zeya
  - coordinates: 51.3931°N 128.2048°E
- Length: 145 km (90 mi)
- Basin size: 4,400 km^{2} (1,700 sq mi)

Basin features
- Progression: Zeya→ Amur→ Sea of Okhotsk

The Bolshaya Pera (Russian: Большая Пера, also Большая Пёра Bolshaya Pyora) is a river in Amur Oblast, Russia. It is a right tributary of the Zeya. It begins on the Amur–Zeya Plain northwest of the mountains it flows through the town of Shimanovsk and the Vostochny Cosmodrome. It flows into a branch of the Zeya near Svobodny. It is 145 kilometres (90 mi) long, and has a drainage basin of 4,400 square kilometres (1,700 sq mi). Its main tributaries are Dzhatva (57 km) and Malaya Pera (88 km) to the right and Ora (55 km) to the left.
