= Dzhatva =

Dzhatva Джатва
- Station
- Location within Amur Oblast Location within Russia
- Coordinates: 51°49′N 128°00′E
- Country: Russia
- Region: Amur Oblast
- District: Shimanovsky District
- Time zone: UTC+9:00

Dzhatva (Russian: Джатва) is a rural locality (a station) in Seletkansky Selsoviet of Shimanovsky District, Amur Oblast, Russia. The population was 4 as of 2018.

== Geography ==
It is located 25 km south-east from Shimanovsk, on the Bolshaya Pyora River.
