= Vostochny Cosmodrome Site 1A =

Launch complex at the Vostochny Cosmodrome in Russia

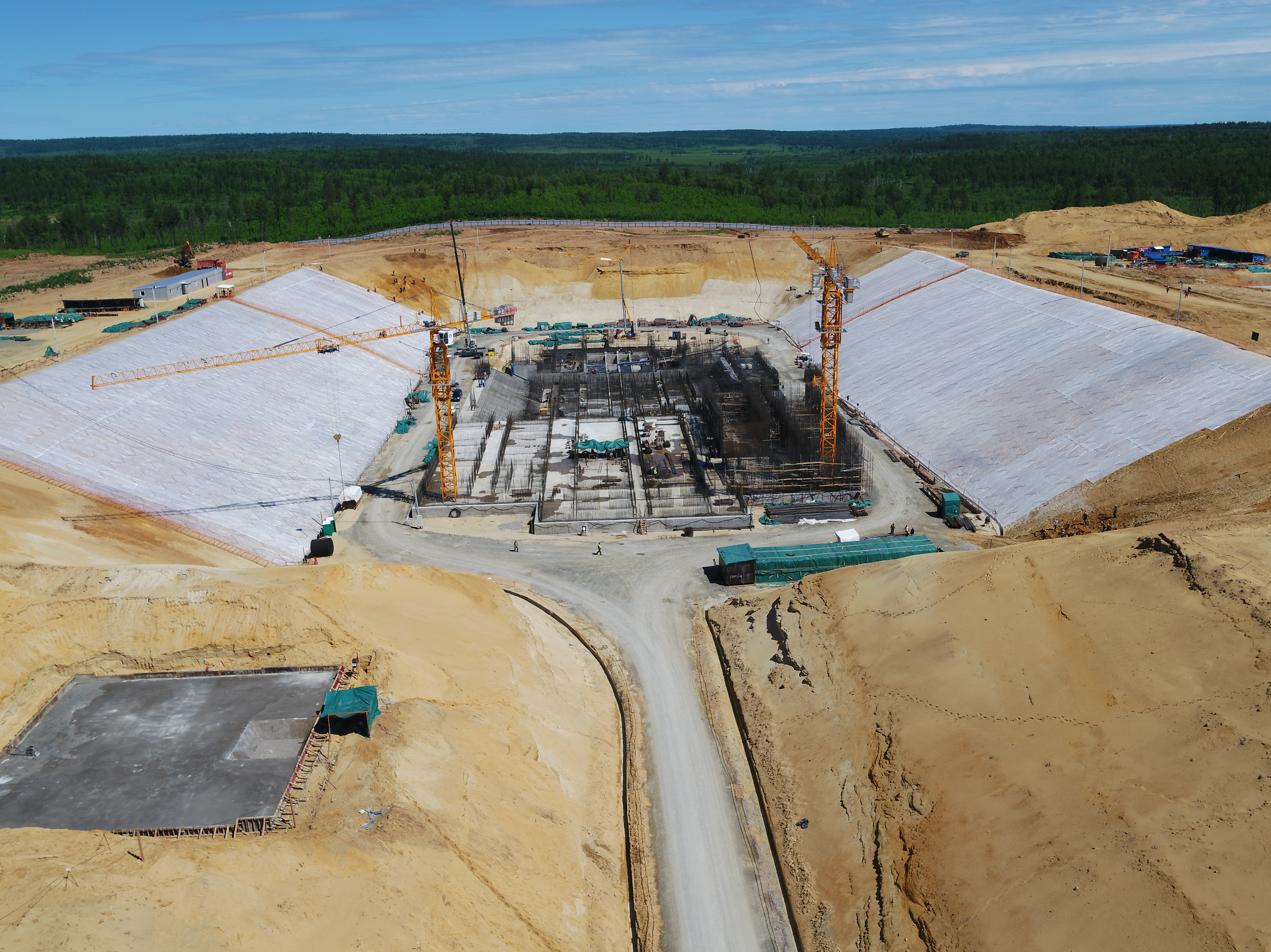
- Pad during construction, July 2020
- Interactive map of Vostochny Cosmodrome Site 1A
- Launch site: Vostochny Cosmodrome
- Coordinates: 51°52′10″N 128°21′26″E
- Operator: Roscosmos
- Launch pad: One
Launch history
- Status: Active
- Launches: 1
- First launch: 11 April 2024; Angara A5 / Test flight No.4
- Associated rockets: Angara Rocket family

The Vostochny Cosmodrome Site-1A (Russian: Площадка-1A) is a launch complex at the Vostochny Cosmodrome in Amur Oblast, Russia. It consist of a single pad for use by Angara rockets.

== History ==
"Angara-A5V" rocket launch complex layout
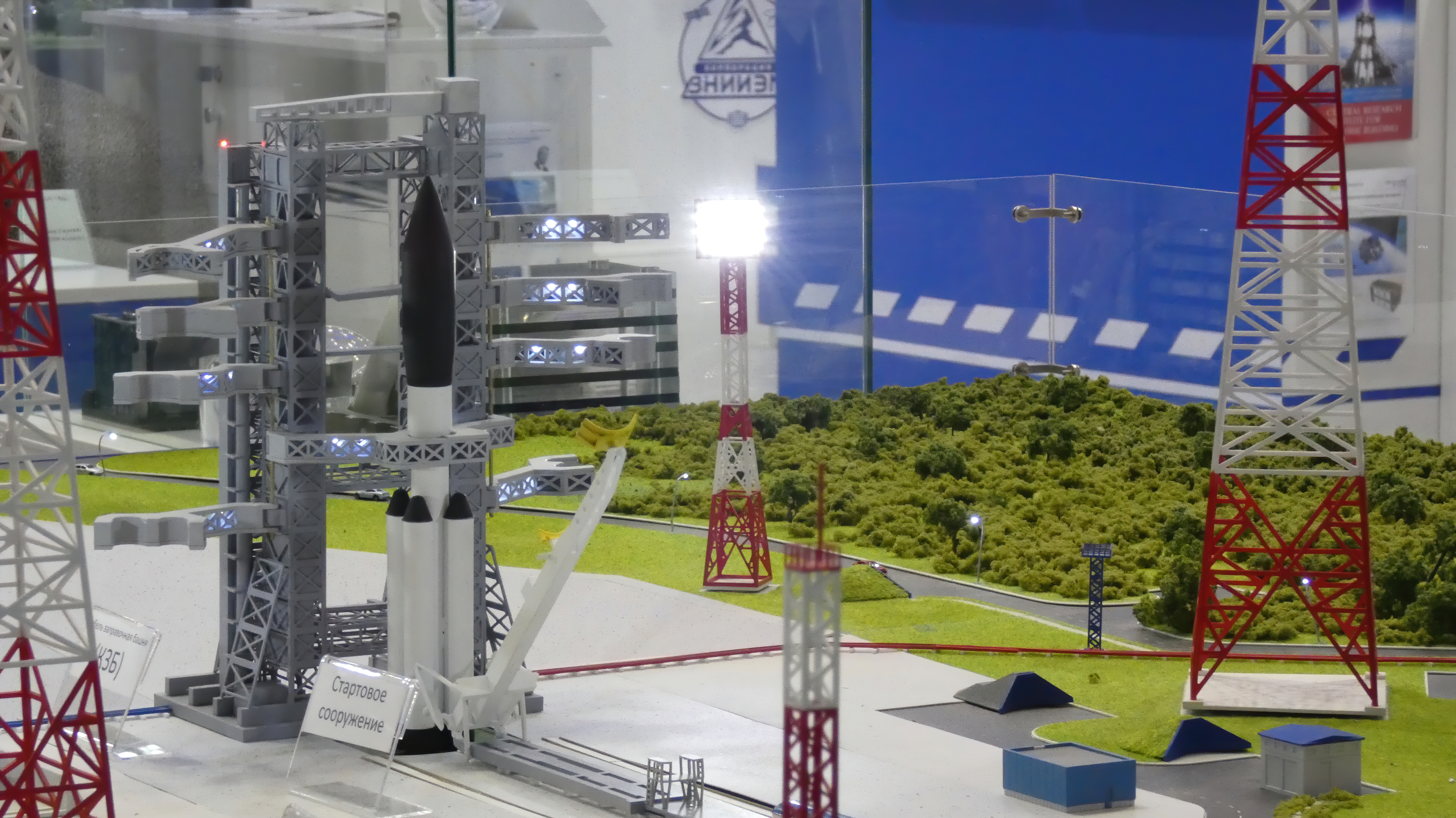
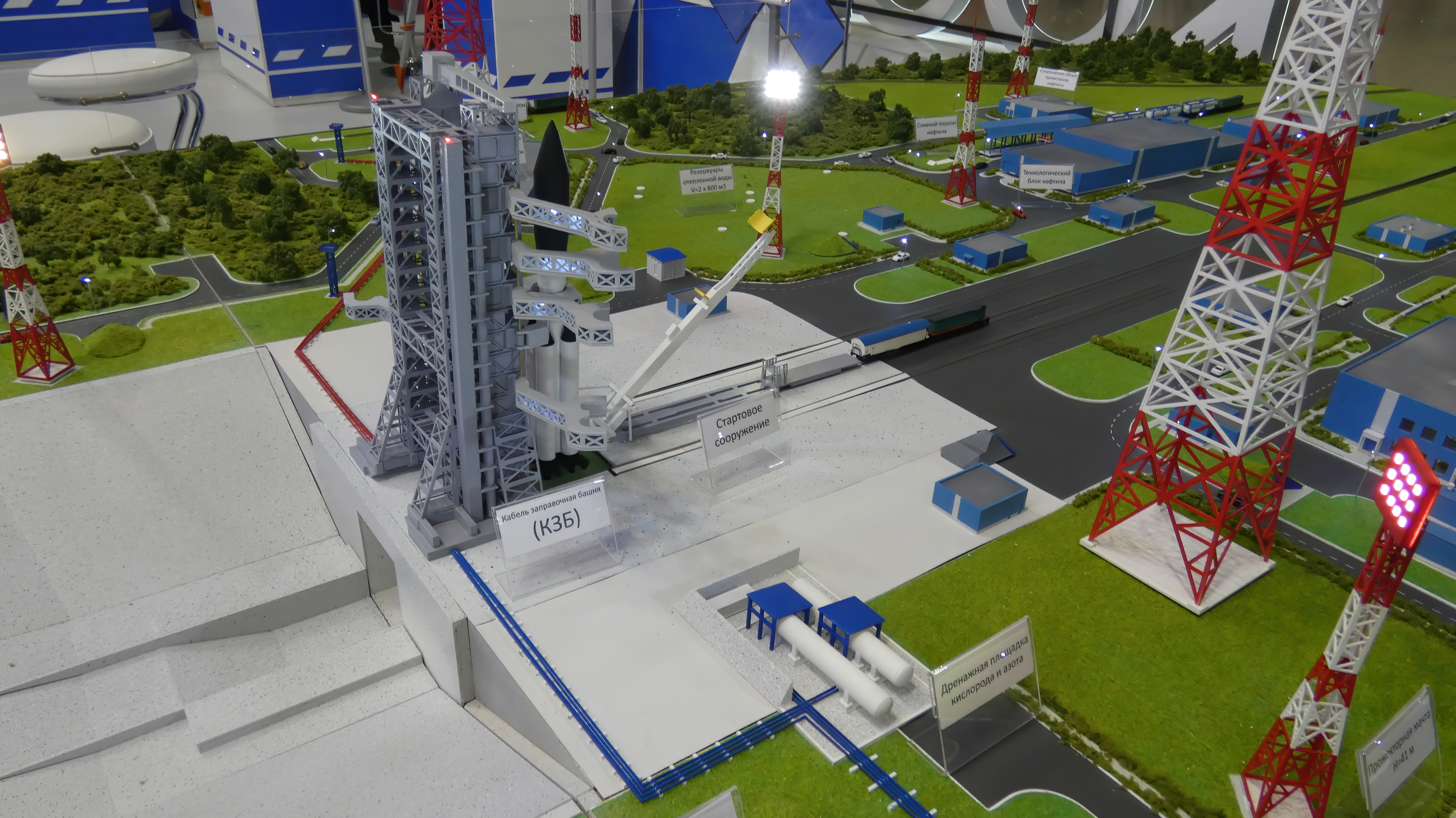

On 23 November 2018, JSC Tyazhmash began to assemble the first metal structures for the cable filling tower, which will have 17 floors and consist of 44 elements. The mass of one element is about 30 tons, the height is 3.3 meters. On 7 December 2018, a source in the rocket and space industry told the media that full-scale construction work would be launched from 2019 (earlier, in August 2017, Ruslan Mukhamedzhanov, general director of TsENKI NIISK affiliate, told the media that trenches could only be started after the ground was thawed spring warming).) At the moment, there are various preparatory work. All construction works stipulated by the contract with the PSP "Kazan", which received positive positive conclusions of the Glavgosexpertiza in May 2018, are carried out in accordance with the schedule.

On 23 January 2019, Deputy Prime Minister Yuri Borisov, following a meeting on the financial and economic status of the state corporation Roskosmos and its subordinate organizations, told the media that the contract with the PSO Kazan was terminated by mutual agreement of the parties. Idle time in construction amounted to almost half a year, as a result of which the deadline for the delivery of the second line of the eastern line shifted in 2021, but not later than 2023. A new contractor will be hired for construction, and no plans are to be made to freeze the construction.

On 30 May 2019 saw the actual start of construction. On 4 June 2019, the head of Roscosmos, Dmitry Rogozin told the media that construction work had begun and work was being done to excavate the soil. On 9 June 2019, a source at the Cosmodrome told the media that on 8 June 2019, builders began digging a pit under the second launch pad using excavators. On 26 July 2019, the head of Roskosmos Dmitry Rogozin told the media that the construction of the launch pad continues, despite heavy rains in the region for a month. On 22 August 2019, Roscosmos confirmed that there was no lag behind the schedule due to heavy rains: the contractor promptly implements the necessary water disposal measures. On 29 August 2019, the head of TsENKI (Russian: ЦЭНКИ), Kirill Filenkov, told the media that factory tests of the support device of the first four floors of the cable-filling tower had been completed successfully and they began sending them to the spaceport. Dispatch will be completed on time with an estimated launch date for Angara-A5 in the fourth quarter of 2023.

On 1 September 2019, the head of Roscosmos, Dmitry Rogozin, announced on Twitter that on 2 September 2019, the foundation pit would begin concreting and 1.5 thousand cubic meters of concrete would be poured. Also on 1 September 2019, Deputy Prime Minister Yuri Borisov in an interview with the media said that the Cabinet was dissatisfied with the pace of construction of the second stage. A change in the contractor is not ruled out: instead of the PSO Kazan, the second stage can be independently completed by a public law company that will unite all the construction assets of the Ministry of Defense. On 5 September 2019, a source in the rocket and space industry told the media that the facilities of the second stage - the launch under the Angara, the command post and the fuel storage - are being built ahead of schedule for a month. To erect a command post, a pit was dug and the concrete base was half-poured; for storage of fuel is the formation of beds under the tank.

== Launch history ==
No.	Date/Time (UTC)	Type	Serial-no.	Payload	Orbit	Outcome
1	11-04-2024; 09:00	Angara A5 / Orion	72901	GMM-KA; Gagarinets; Dummy cubesat	GSO / LEO	Success
