= Large Interferometer For Exoplanets =

Proposed space mission

LIFE Space Mission (Large Interferometer For Exoplanets)
- Mission type: Exoplanet observation
- Website: www.life-space-mission.com
- Mission duration: 5-6 years

Start of mission
- Launch date: 2040

Main telescope
- Type: 4-telescope array with 6:1 baseline ratio, maximum/minimum allowed separation: 600 m / 10 m, 1 beam combiner spacecraft
- Diameter: 4 x 2–3.5 m
- Wavelengths: 4 – 18 μm (mid-infrared)
- Resolution: spectral: 35–50

Large Interferometer For Exoplanets (LIFE) is a proposed space mission concept designed to detect and characterize the atmospheres of Earth-like exoplanets using mid-infrared interferometry. The mission concept is based on a formation-flying space interferometer that would directly observe terrestrial exoplanets around nearby stars and search for atmospheric biosignatures. The project was initiated in 2017 by an international collaboration led by ETH Zurich and involves scientists and engineers from multiple institutions and countries.

The mission concept focuses on conducting a large atmospheric survey of terrestrial exoplanets in the solar neighborhood and studying planetary habitability, atmospheric composition, and potential biosignatures.

== Mission Concept ==
The LIFE mission concept consists of five spacecraft flying in formation and operating together as a mid-infrared nulling interferometer. Four spacecraft arranged in a plane collect the incoming light and redirect it to the fifth spacecraft, which combines the light beams. The interferometer suppresses the light from a host star while allowing the much fainter thermal emission from orbiting planets to be detected and analyzed spectroscopically.

The mission would operate in the mid-infrared wavelength range, where terrestrial planets emit thermal radiation and where selected atmospheric molecules show strong spectral features. The interferometer baseline would be adjustable to optimize planet detection and atmospheric characterization.

The mission architecture builds on earlier space interferometer concepts such as ESA's Darwin and NASA's Terrestrial Planet Finder Interferometer (TPF-I), but incorporates updated technology developments, improved detection yield estimates, and modern formation-flying capabilities.

== Scientific Objectives ==
The main scientific objective of the LIFE mission is the detection and atmospheric characterization of terrestrial exoplanets, particularly planets located in the habitable zones of nearby stars.

Key scientific objectives include:

1. Detecting rocky exoplanets in the habitable zones of nearby stars
2. Measuring their atmospheric composition
3. Studying planetary climates and surface conditions
4. Searching for atmospheric biosignatures
5. Constraining the frequency of habitable planets in the solar neighbourhood

Simulations indicate that a large mid-infrared space interferometer could detect and characterize dozens of terrestrial exoplanets, enabling comparative exoplanetology beyond the Solar System.

== Atmospheric Biosignatures ==
The LIFE mission is designed to perform mid-infrared spectroscopy of exoplanet atmospheres, allowing the detection of molecular absorption features from gases such as:

1. Carbon dioxide (CO_{2})
2. Water vapor (H_{2}O)
3. Ozone (O_{3})
4. Methane (CH_{4})
5. Nitrous oxide (N_{2}O)
6. Phosphine (PH_{3})

These molecules can provide information about planetary climate, atmospheric chemistry, and potential biological activity.

== Detection and Characterization of Target Planets ==
Mission simulations suggest that a mid-infrared interferometer such as LIFE could detect a significant number of terrestrial planets around nearby stars and characterize a subset of them spectroscopically.

The mission would primarily target planets around Sun-like stars and nearby M-dwarfs, focusing on planets located in the habitable zone where liquid water could exist on the surface.

Recent studies within the LIFE collaboration have also investigated the detectability of terrestrial protoplanets and young planetary systems in the solar neighborhood.

== Technology and Instrumentation ==
The LIFE mission relies on several key technologies:

Nulling Interferometry

Nulling interferometry combines light from multiple telescopes so that starlight is suppressed through destructive interference, allowing faint planetary signals to be detected. The technology is being tested in laboratory with the Nulling Interferometry Cryogenic Experiment (NICE) to demonstrate the required stability and sensitivity.

Beam Combination and Instrumentation

Studies within the LIFE project have investigated beam combiner architectures, instrumental uncertainties, and redundancy strategies for space-based interferometry. The combination of the four incoming light beams allows to obtain destructive interference (along the nulling baseline) for the on-axis starlight and the determination of the off-axis planet location using the interference along the imaging baseline.

Formation Flying

The mission requires multiple spacecraft flying in precise formation with separations ranging from tens to hundreds of meters, enabling the interferometric baseline necessary for planet detection. The four collector spacecraft are placed in a plane, all pointing to the target. The entire array of spacecraft will rotate along the pointing axis to determine the planet's location.

Atmospheric Retrieval and Spectroscopy

Selected targets are planned to be analyzed in detail after the initial planet detection phase. Longer observations allow to obtain the spectra of the exoplanet atmospheres. Simulations have been conducted to determine the spectral resolution, wavelength coverage, and sensitivity requirements for informative atmospheric retrievals of Earth-like exoplanets.

== LIFE Research Papers ==
1. Cesario, L. et al. (2024). Large Interferometer For Exoplanets (LIFE): XIV. Finding terrestrial protoplanets in the galactic neighborhood. Astronomy & Astrophysics.
2. Alei, E. et al. (2024). Large Interferometer For Exoplanets (LIFE): XIII. The value of combining thermal emission and reflected light for the characterization of Earth twins. Astronomy & Astrophysics.
3. Angerhausen, D. et al. (2024). Large Interferometer For Exoplanets (LIFE). XII. The Detectability of Capstone Biosignatures in the Mid-infrared. Astronomical Journal.
4. Matsuo, T. et al. (2023). Large Interferometer For Exoplanets (LIFE). XI. Phase-space synthesis decomposition. Astronomy & Astrophysics.
5. Carrión-González, Ó. et al. (2023). Large Interferometer For Exoplanets (LIFE). X. Detectability of currently known exoplanets. Astronomy & Astrophysics.
6. Konrad, B. S. et al. (2023). Large Interferometer For Exoplanets (LIFE). IX. Assessing the impact of clouds on atmospheric retrievals. Astronomy & Astrophysics.
7. Angerhausen, D. et al. (2023). Large Interferometer for Exoplanets: VIII. Where Is the Phosphine? Astrobiology.
8. Hansen, J. T. et al. (2023). Large Interferometer For Exoplanets (LIFE). VII. Practical implementation of a five-telescope kernel-nulling beam combiner. Astronomy & Astrophysics.
9. Kammerer, J. et al. (2022). Large Interferometer For Exoplanets (LIFE). VI. Detecting rocky exoplanets in the habitable zones of Sun-like stars. Astronomy & Astrophysics.
10. Alei, E. et al. (2022). Large Interferometer For Exoplanets (LIFE). V. Diagnostic potential of a mid-infrared space interferometer. Astronomy & Astrophysics.
11. Hansen, J. T. et al. (2022). Large Interferometer For Exoplanets (LIFE). IV. Ideal kernel-nulling array architectures. Astronomy & Astrophysics.
12. Konrad, B. S. et al. (2022). Large Interferometer For Exoplanets (LIFE). III. Spectral resolution, wavelength range, and sensitivity requirements. Astronomy & Astrophysics.
13. Dannert, F. A. et al. (2022). Large Interferometer For Exoplanets (LIFE). II. Signal simulation and extraction. Astronomy & Astrophysics.
14. Quanz, S. P. et al. (2022). Large Interferometer For Exoplanets (LIFE). I. Improved exoplanet detection yield estimates for a large mid-infrared space-interferometer mission. Astronomy & Astrophysics.

== See also ==
- Astrobiology
- Biosignature
- Nuller
