= Lunar Cruiser =

Japanese crewed rover for use on the Moon

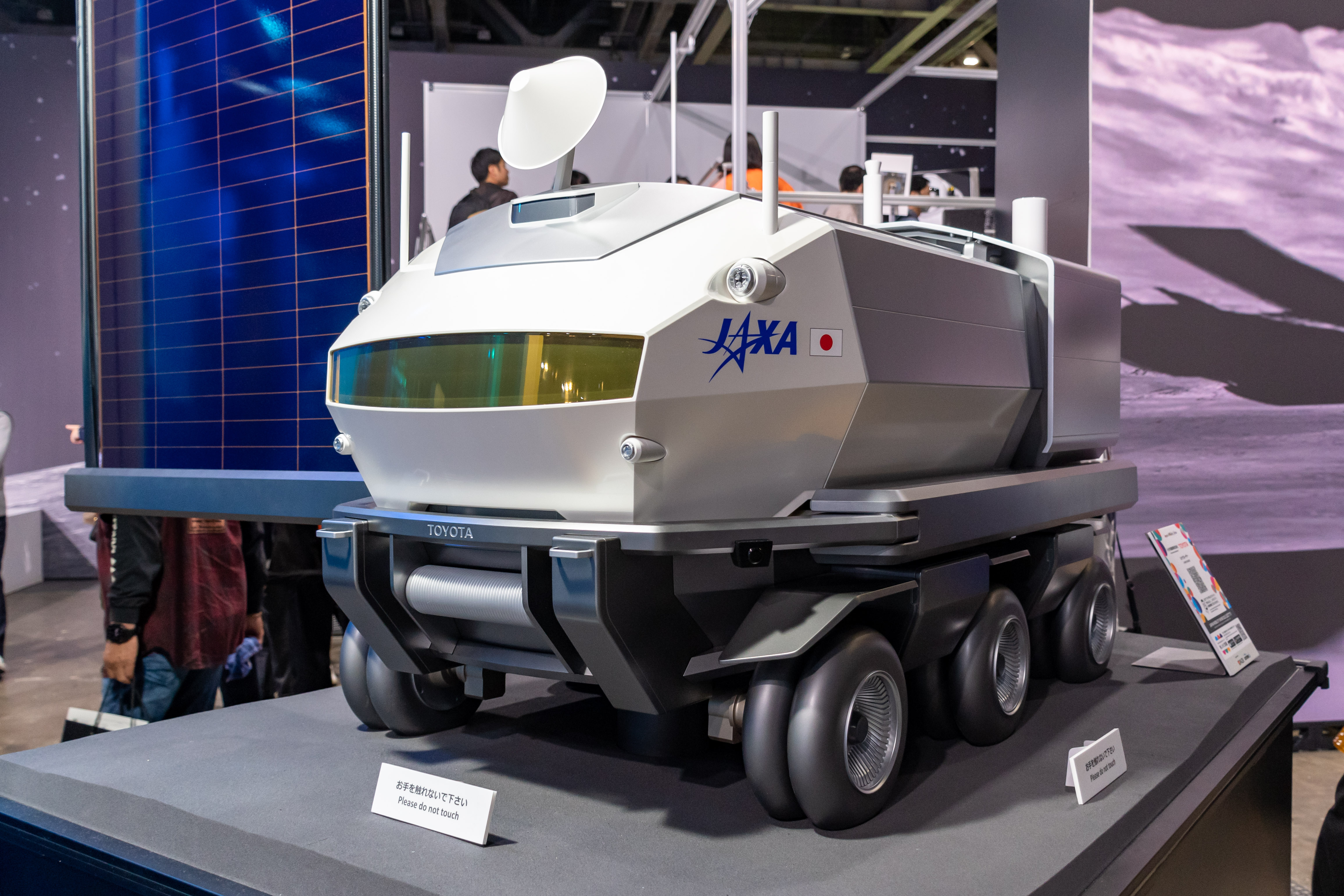
A model of the Lunar Cruiser on display at Japan Mobility Show 2023

The Lunar Cruiser (Japanese: ルナクルーザー, romanized: Runa Kurūzā) is the nickname of a crewed pressurized lunar rover being developed jointly by JAXA and Toyota that astronauts can drive and live in on the Moon. Designed for the US-led Artemis Program, its name is inspired by a Toyota off-road vehicle, the Land Cruiser.

== Mobile Habitat ==
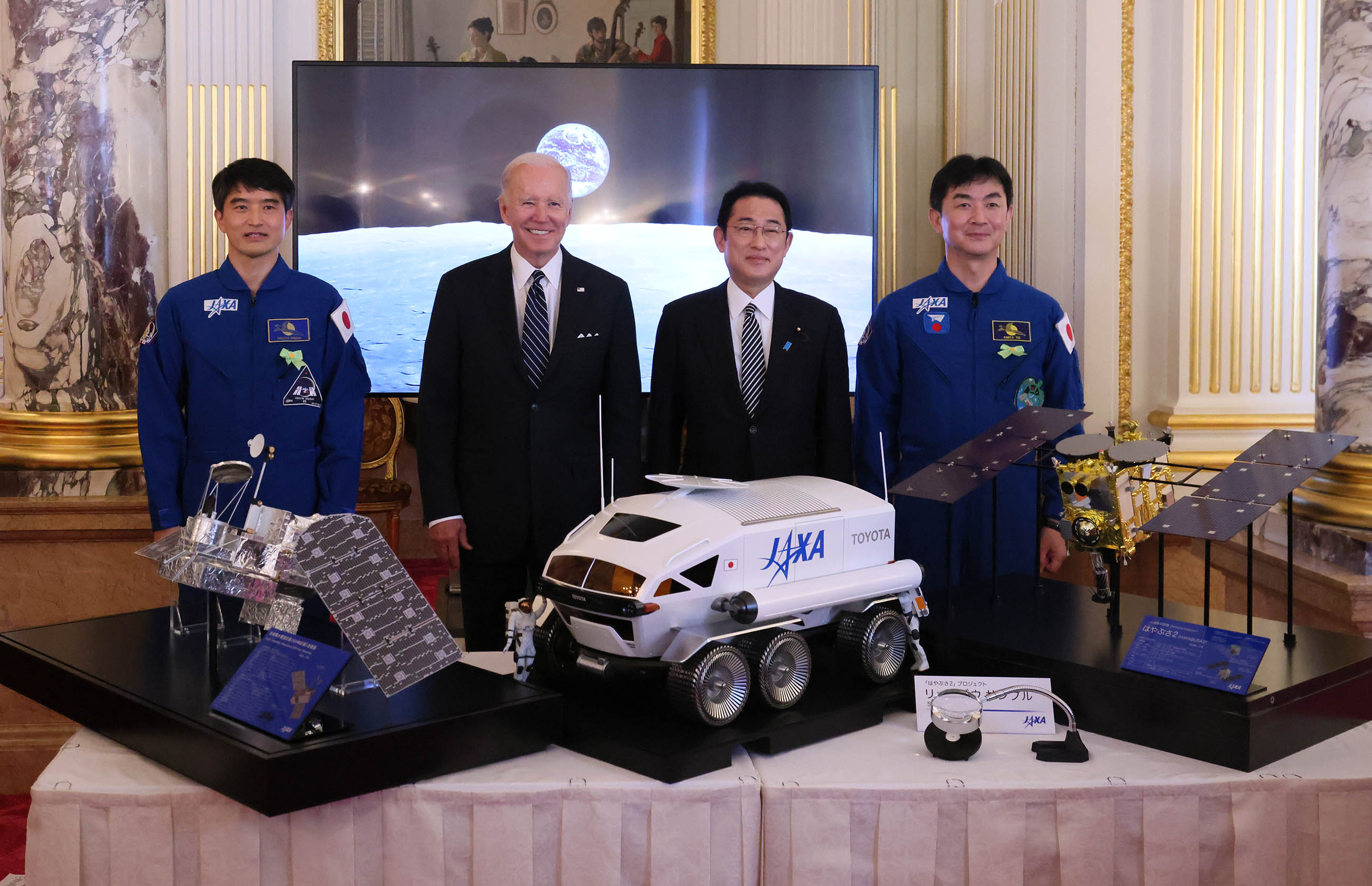
Fumio Kishida and Joe Biden with rover model

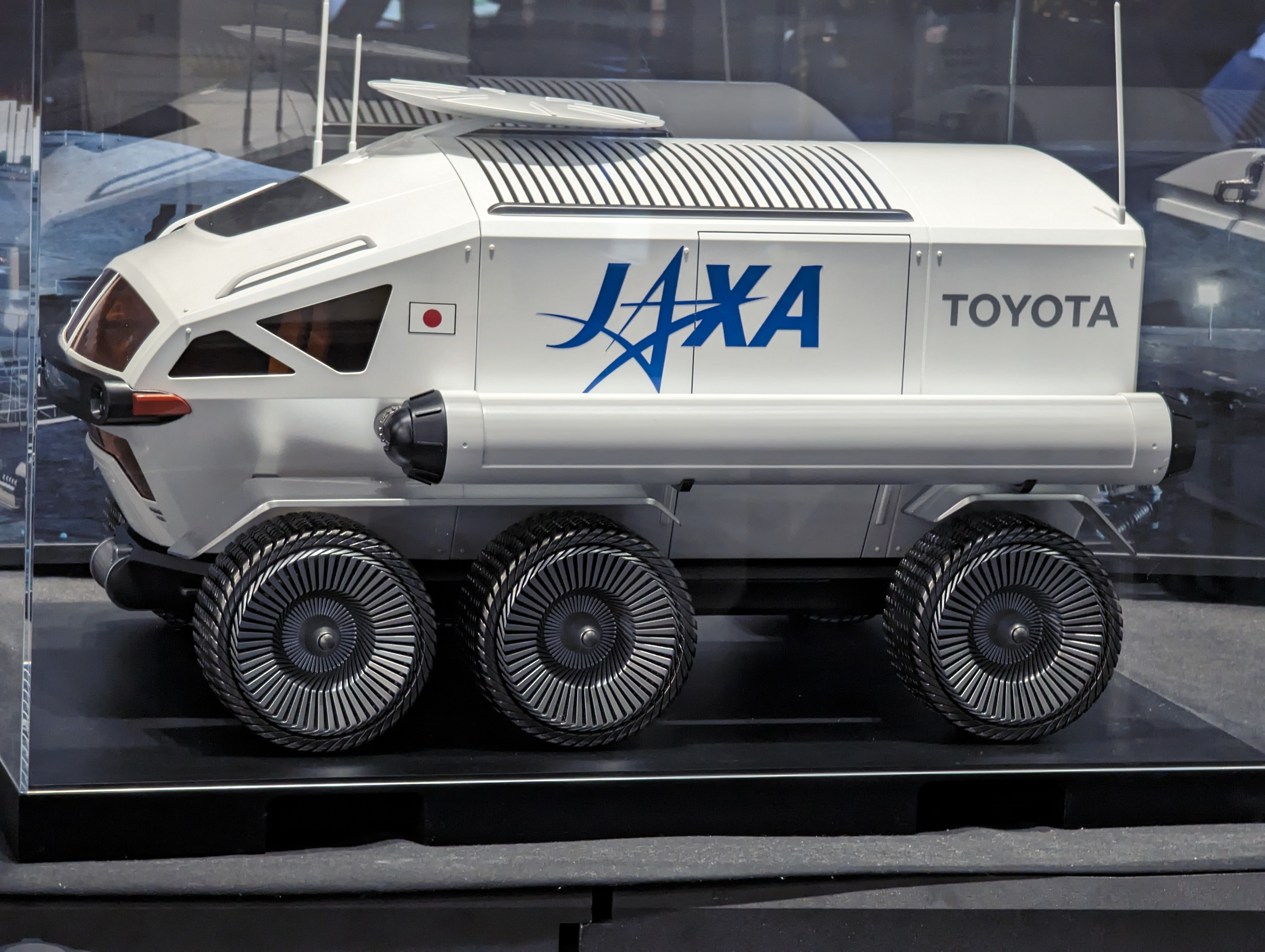
Side view of the rover

The Lunar Cruiser is being developed as a part of NASA's Artemis program and will enable astronaut crews to take trips across the Moon lasting up to 30–45 days, and live independently from the station by using its life support system as a backup. Named after the Toyota Land Cruiser, its name was chosen "because of the familiar feeling it offers the people involved in the development and manufacture of the vehicle prototype as part of the joint research project as well as the familiarity it will provide the general public." The rover is currently being manufactured, with an expected launch date no earlier than 2032. The rover itself will use fuel-cell electric-vehicle technologies. An update by the development team in late 2023 indicated the very first cruiser would be deployed along with the first moonbase. Mitsubishi is helping develop the hydrogen electrolysis unit due to its development in new maritime technology.
