= Vostochny Cosmodrome =

Spaceport in Amur Oblast, Russia

- Soyuz-2.1a preparing for the first launch from Vostochny in 2016

Agency overview
- Formed: 1 August 2011
- Jurisdiction: Government of Russia
- Headquarters: Tsiolkovsky, Amur Oblast; 51°53′04.39″N 128°20′05.2″E
- Parent agency: Roscosmos

Map
- Vostochny Cosmodrome (Russia)

The Vostochny Cosmodrome (Russian: Космодром Восточный, romanized: Kosmodrom Vostochnyy, lit. 'Eastern Spaceport') is a Russian space launch facility in the Amur Oblast, located above the 51st parallel north in the Russian Far East. It was built to help reduce Russia’s reliance on the Baikonur Cosmodrome which is located on land the Russian government leases from Kazakhstan. The civilian launch facility is operated by Roscosmos, the state corporation responsible for space flights. The facility was established in August 2011 and saw its first launch on 28 April 2016.

== Location ==
Vostochny is in the Svobodny and Shimanovsk districts of Amur Oblast in the Russian Far East, on the watershed of the Zeya and Bolshaya Pyora rivers, approximately 600–800 km (370–500 mi) from the Pacific Ocean, depending on launch azimuth. The planned total area is about 30 kilometres (19 mi) in diameter or about 551.5 square kilometres (212.9 sq mi) in area, centered. The nearby railway station is Ledyanaya and the nearest city is Tsiolkovsky.

The latitude means that rockets will be able to carry almost the same amount of payload as they can when launched from Baikonur at 46° N. Other positives include the ability to use sparsely populated areas and bodies of water for the rocket launch routes; proximity to major transportation networks such as the Baikal–Amur Mainline and the Chita–Khabarovsk Highway; abundant local electricity production (for the hydrogen rocket fuel electrolysis and liquefaction); and the infrastructure supporting the former Svobodny Cosmodrome, the local prototype.

The location has an abundant supply of most materials and allows rockets to jettison their lower stages over the ocean. It was expanded as part of a plan to modernize the supporting infrastructure. Russian president Vladimir Putin confirmed that other places proffered were on the shore of the Pacific, near Vladivostok, which experts have disfavoured for their oceanic climate, liable to cause delays in date-sensitive launches.

== History ==
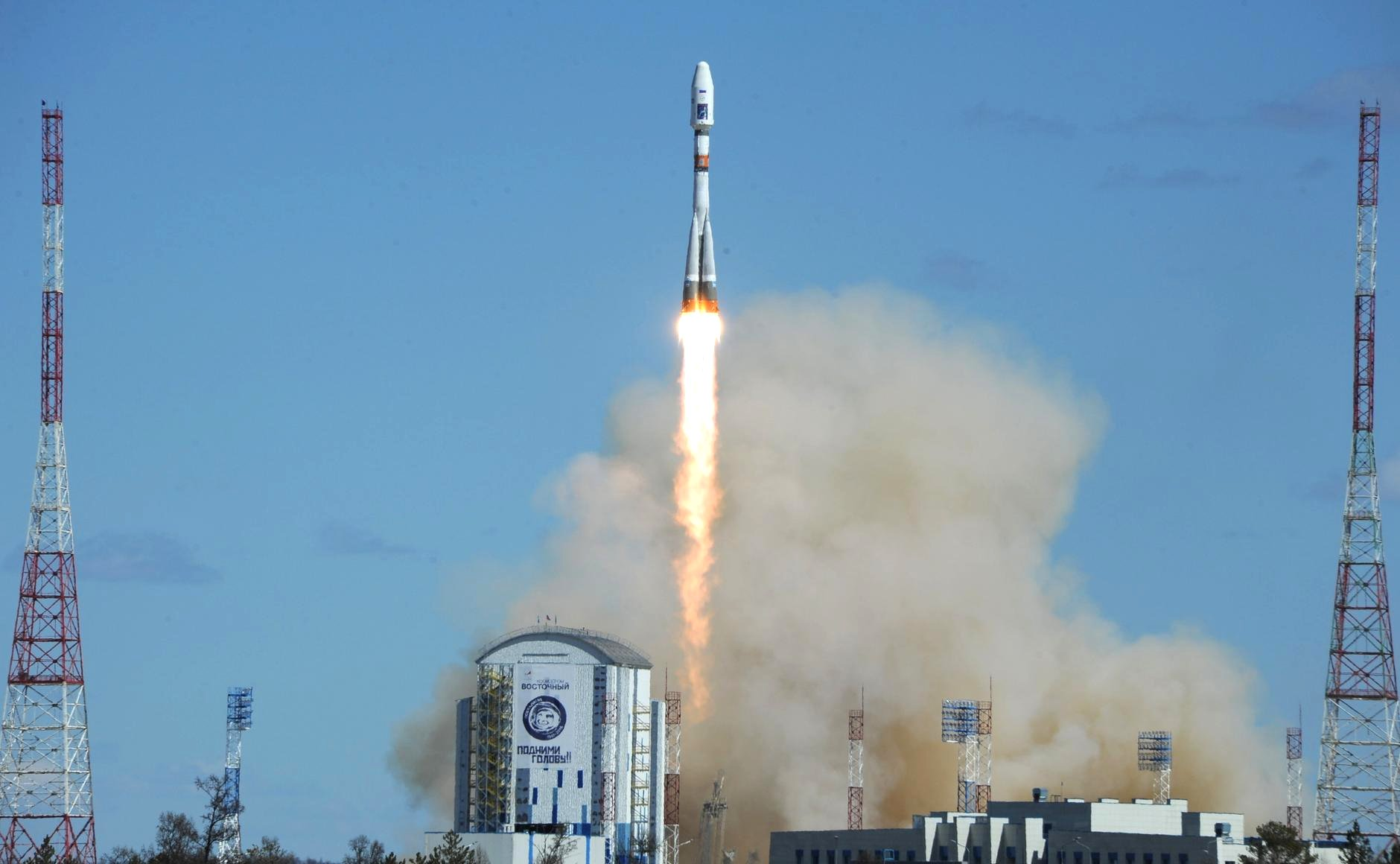
The first rocket to launch from Vostochny Cosmodrome, a Soyuz-2.1a, on 28 April 2016.

The Vostochny Cosmodrome project was initiated in 2011 as part of Russia’s effort to reduce reliance on the Baikonur Cosmodrome in Kazakhstan, which Russia leased following the collapse of the Soviet Union.

The concept for building a new cosmodrome on Russian territory emerged in the 2000s, when government officials and scientists began discussing the need for a domestic civilian launch site to reduce reliance on the Baikonur Cosmodrome in Kazakhstan, which Russia continued to lease after the collapse of the Soviet Union. President Vladimir Putin personally participated in selecting the site; an early proposal to build near Vladivostok on the Pacific coast was abandoned due to adverse weather conditions, and the project was instead relocated inland to the Amur Oblast in Russia's Far East.

The chosen site was the former Svobodny Cosmodrome, a missile base established by decree of President Boris Yeltsin in March 1996. Only five spacecraft were launched from Svobodny before it was closed in March 2007. In 2007, Putin signed a decree formally authorizing development of a new spaceport on the site, and Roscosmos approved the design on 11 July 2008. Engineers drew on experience from the construction of the Soyuz Launch Complex in French Guiana and the Angara launch pad at South Korea's Naro Space Center.

Construction began in January 2011, with the Mechanical Engineering Project Institute (Ipromashprom) serving as the general designer and the Federal Agency for Special Construction (Spetstroy) as the main contractor. The master plan envisioned seven launch pads, including two for crewed missions, as well as more than 400 infrastructure facilities, 115 kilometres (71 mi) of roads, and 125 kilometres (78 mi) of railways. The project was initially scheduled for completion by 2018.

=== Construction ===
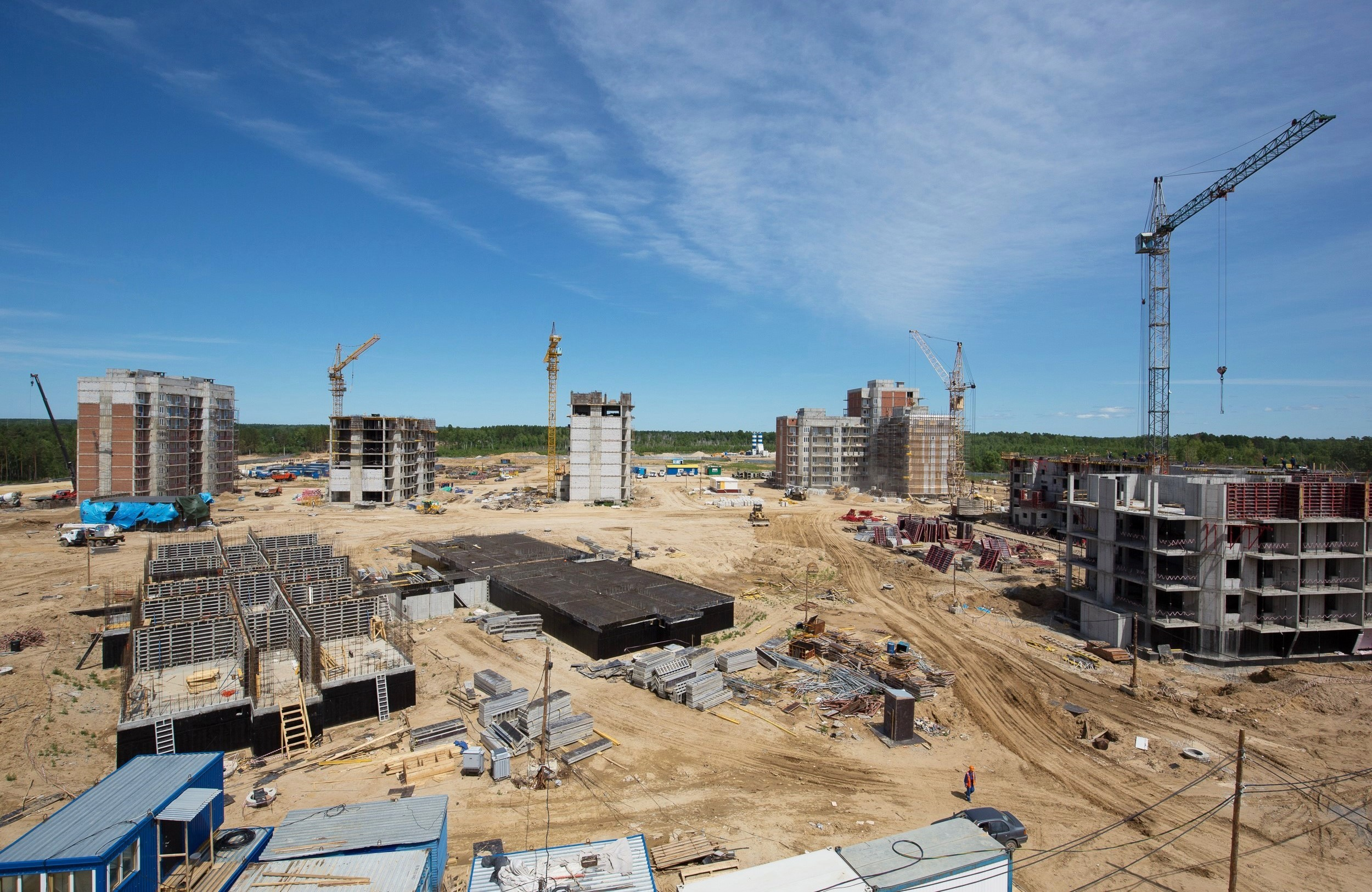
Residential buildings under construction in Tsiolkovsky, Amur Oblast, near Vostochny Cosmodrome in 2015.

On 1 September 2009, President Dmitry Medvedev designated Spetstroy as the main construction contractor. From the outset, construction was hindered by delays, cost overruns, and corruption scandals. Reports of unpaid wages, hunger strikes, and embezzlement of public funds led to multiple criminal investigations and the dismissal of several senior officials. By 2013, over 5,000 workers were employed on site, and housing development in the nearby town of Uglegorsk—later renamed Tsiolkovsky—was underway. The site was connected to Russia’s national power grid in 2014, and the first Soyuz-2.1a rocket arrived the following year ahead of Vostochny’s inaugural launch on 28 April 2016.

Construction of a second launch complex, Site 1A for the Angara rocket, began in 2018. Work was delayed by structural defects, including cavities discovered under the launch pad due to improperly poured concrete, which were later repaired. Roscosmos terminated its contract with contractor PSO Kazan in 2019 following delays and cost overruns but later reinstated the firm after other potential contractors withdrew, citing insufficient government funding. The Angara pad was completed in 2024, supporting its first launch later that year.

In November 2025, the Far Eastern Energy Company disconnected power to areas of the spaceport still under construction after PSO Kazan accumulated about US$627,000 in unpaid electricity bills, prompting bankruptcy proceedings. Officials confirmed that operations at the two active launch pads were unaffected and that the contractor had pledged to settle its debt by the end of the month.

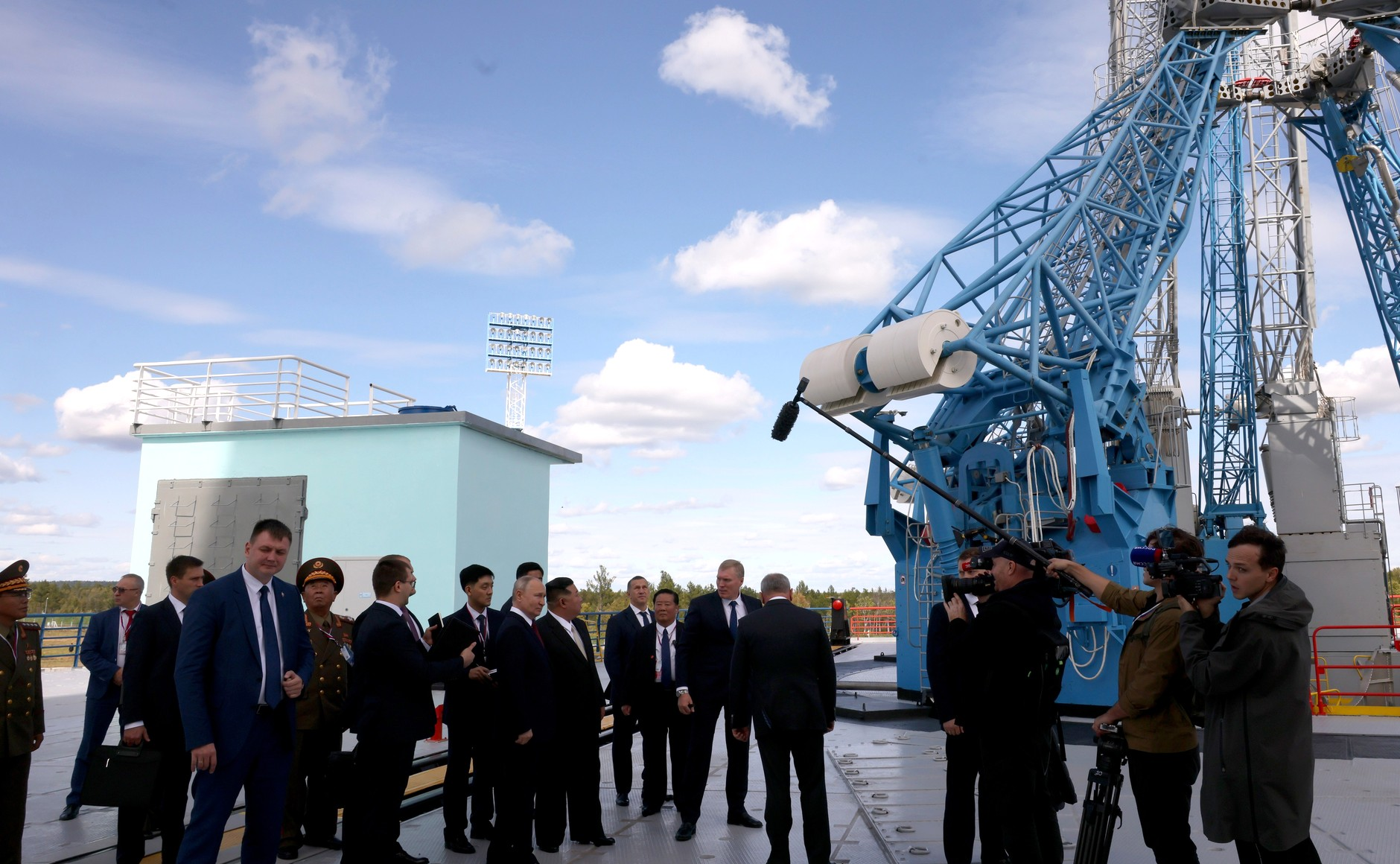
Vladimir Putin and Kim Jong Un visiting Vostochny Cosmodrome on 13 September 2023.

On 13 September 2023, North Korean leader Kim Jong Un met with Putin at the site during the 2023 North Korea–Russia summit.

== Launches ==
The launch of the Soyuz-2.1a from Vostochny Cosmodrome, 28 April 2016.

The first launch at the complex occurred on 28 April 2016, at 02:01 UTC, when a Soyuz-2 launched from pad Site 1S, carrying the gamma-ray astronomy satellite Mikhailo Lomonosov.

The second launch occurred on 28 November 2017, also from Site 1S, with a Soyuz-2.1b/Fregat carrying Meteor-M No.2-1. The mission was declared a failure after telemetry was lost and the rocket re-entered the atmosphere due to the Fregat upper stage being programmed for a launch from Baikonur rather than the new Vostochny Cosmodrome.

The third launch occurred on 1 February 2018 from Site 1S, with a Soyuz 2.1a/Fregat-M. The primary payloads were two Russian government Earth observation satellites, Kanopus-V 3 and 4. Also aboard were 9 cubesats. The launch was successful.

The fourth launch from Vostochny, using a Soyuz 2.1a, was conducted on 27 December 2018. The primary payloads were two Russian government Earth observation satellites, Kanopus-V 5 and 6. Also aboard were 26 small satellites that were deployed as secondary payloads. The launch of these small satellites was organized by GK Launch Services, a commercial subsidiary of Roscosmos.

The fifth launch took place on 5 July 2019. The Soyuz-2 rocket delivered weather satellite Meteor-M2-2 into orbit.

The sixth launch was conducted on 18 December 2020, with a Soyuz-2.1b/Fregat from Site 1S. The payload was 36 OneWeb Internet link satellites into low Earth orbit. The launch was successful.

The seventh–eleventh launches were conducted on 25 March, 26 April, 28 May, 1 July, and 10 October 2021, each with a Soyuz 2.1b/Fregat-M from Site 1S. Again, 36 × 5 OneWeb satellites were successfully launched into LEO.

On 10 August 2023 the Soyuz-2 rocket carrying Luna 25 was launched. The probe launched and entered lunar orbit successfully, but later crashed into the moon.

== Purpose ==
The aim of the cosmodrome is to enable Russia to launch most missions from its own land, and reduce the dependency of Russia on the Baikonur Cosmodrome which is leased from the government of Kazakhstan. Baikonur is the launch site operated by Russia with the legacy capability to launch crewed missions to ISS or toward lower inclination and geostationary orbits. The Russian government pays a yearly rent of $115 million to Kazakhstan for its usage. Satellites bound for high inclination orbits can be currently launched from Plesetsk Cosmodrome in northwestern Russia. The new site is intended mostly for civilian launches. As of 2011, Roscosmos planned to move 45% of Russia's space launches to Vostochny by 2020, while the share from Baikonur was expected to drop from 65% to 11%, and Plesetsk to account for 44%. In 2012, the share of space launches on Russian soil stood at 25%, and was projected to increase to 90% by 2030.

== Economic aspects ==
Development of the Vostochny Cosmodrome is expected to have a positive impact on the economy of the relatively poorly developed Russian Far East. The Russian government has a strategic policy to bring high-tech companies into the Far East region, and several enterprises involved in human space flight are expected to move their activities there when the new cosmodrome is completed. Development of the new site is also expected to dramatically increase employment in the towns of Tsiolkovsky, Shimanovsk, Svobodny and others. Along with the launch pads and processing facilities, an airport and a satellite city will be constructed. The city will be designed to accommodate 35,000 people as well as tourists. It will contain a full supporting infrastructure with schools, kindergartens and clinics. Architect Dmitry Pshenichnikov has stated that the city is to become a "one-of-its-kind scientific and tourist space town with a unique design and a beautiful landscape".

In November 2012, press reports indicated that the Russian government is having difficulty in finding a good use for the new spaceport, and that other government ministries have been avoiding the project, calling it a "dolgostroya" (Russian: долгостроя)(Russian for a long term construction; usually wastes financial resources).

=== Controversies ===
Corruption severely set back construction of the Vostochny Cosmodrome. According to Russian prosecutors, at least US$165 million was embezzled during the construction process (critics claim that these numbers are severely downplayed), and in 2015, 350 workers painted giant messages on their barracks, asking Vladimir Putin to help after long payment delays. By July 2016, the price for the spaceport was US$7.5 billion with costs rising every year (for example, an additional US$105 million was requested in 2016). By 2019, about 60 persons had been convicted for corruption. In 2020, several officials associated with Vostochny Cosmodrome were fired or arrested.

== Launch pads ==
Seven launch pads are planned to be built at Vostochny over several years. Launch pads include:

- Site 1S ("S" for "Soyuz") – Soyuz-2, first launch on 28 April 2016, at 02:01 UTC. Located at 51°52′58″N 128°19′58″E.
- Site 1A ("A" for "Angara") – Angara-1.2/A5/A5P/A5V, construction began in September 2018, first launch on 11 April 2024, at 09:00 UTC. Located at 51°52′10″N 128°21′26″E.
- Site 2A – Amur. The construction will begin after construction of site 1A has been completed.
- PU 3 ("PU" or "ПУ" for "puskovaya ustanovka" or "пусковая установка", meaning "launch pad") – upcoming super heavy-lift launch vehicle.

== Gallery ==
Site 1S (Soyuz)

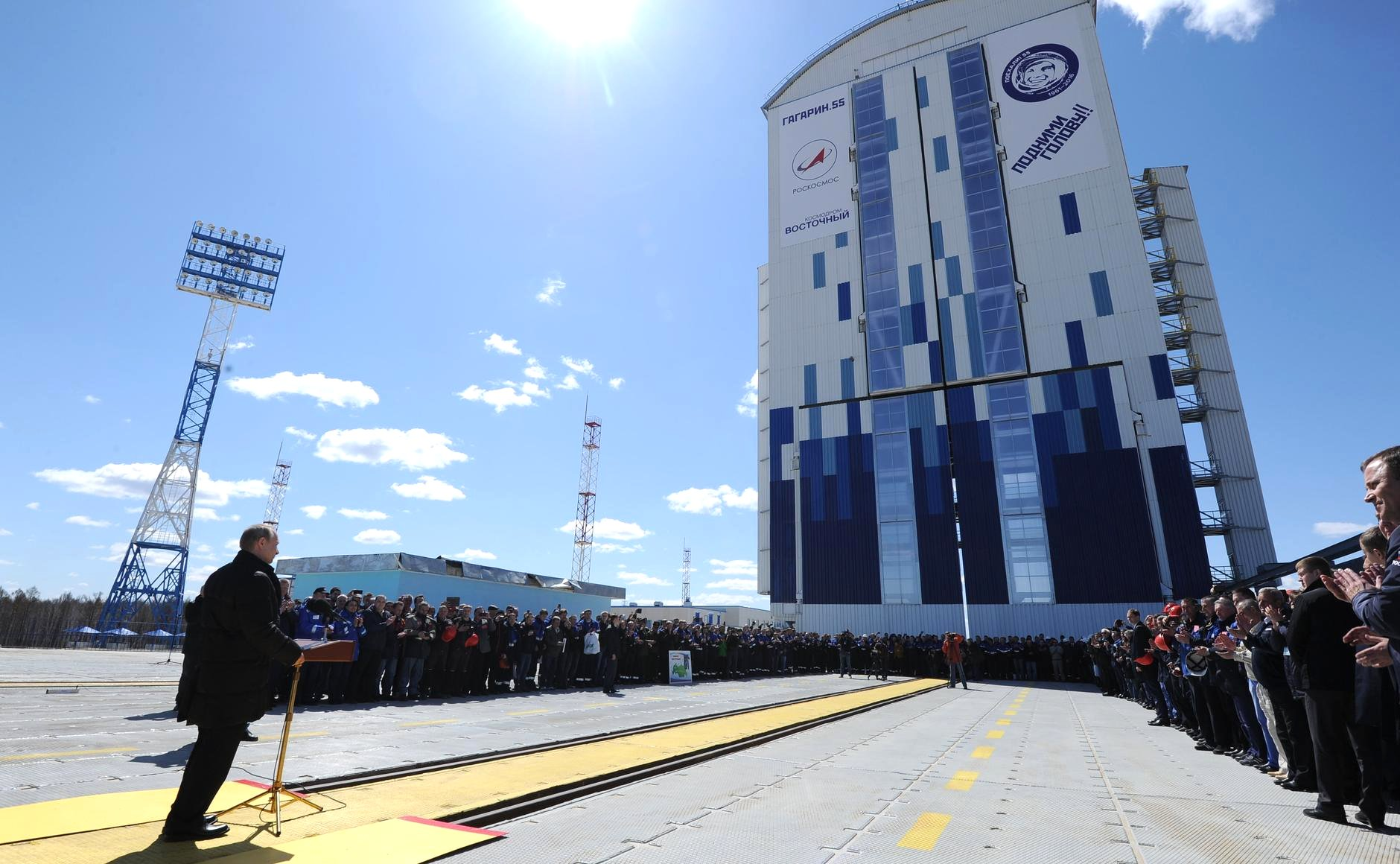
Site 1S assembly building

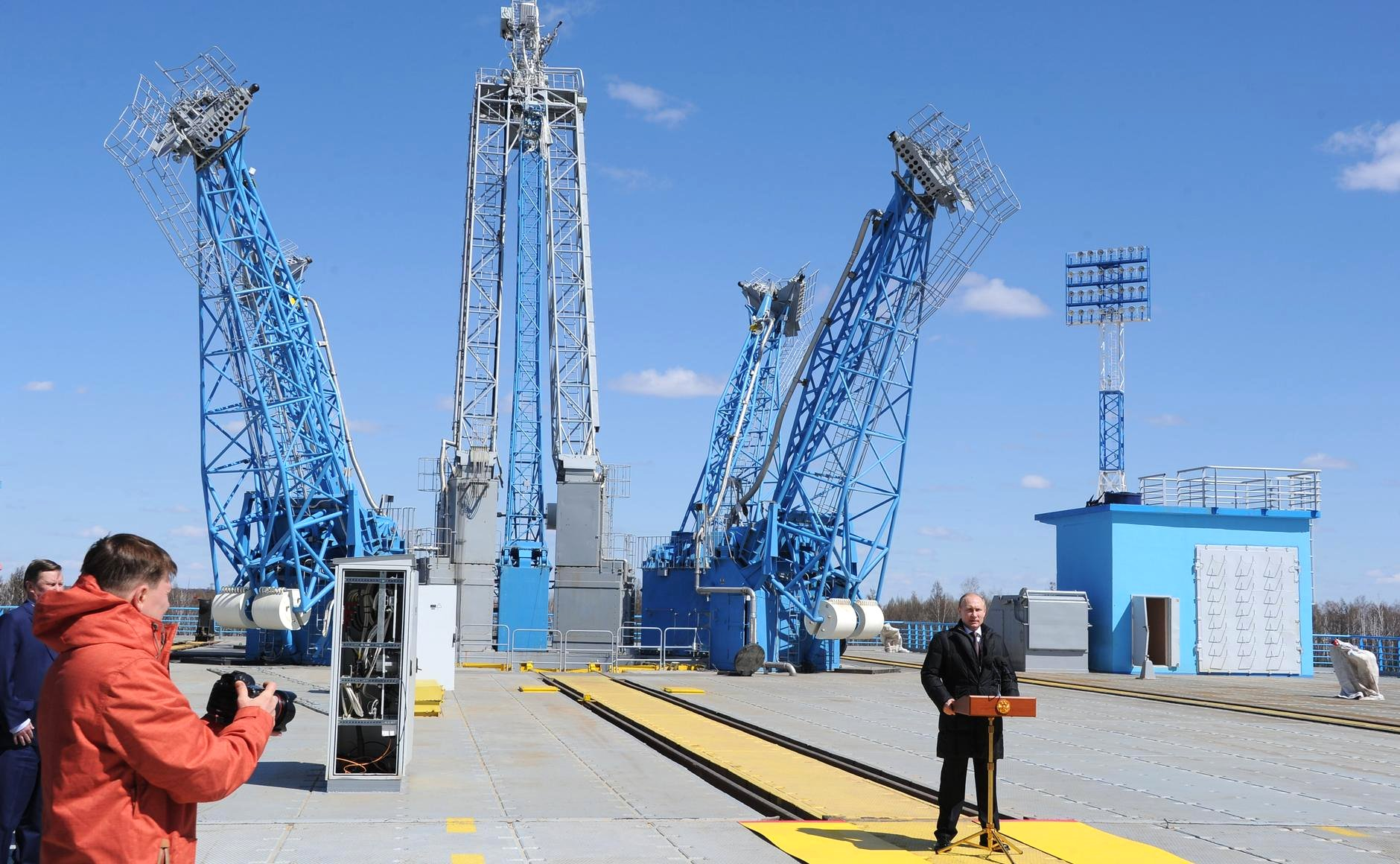
Site 1S pad

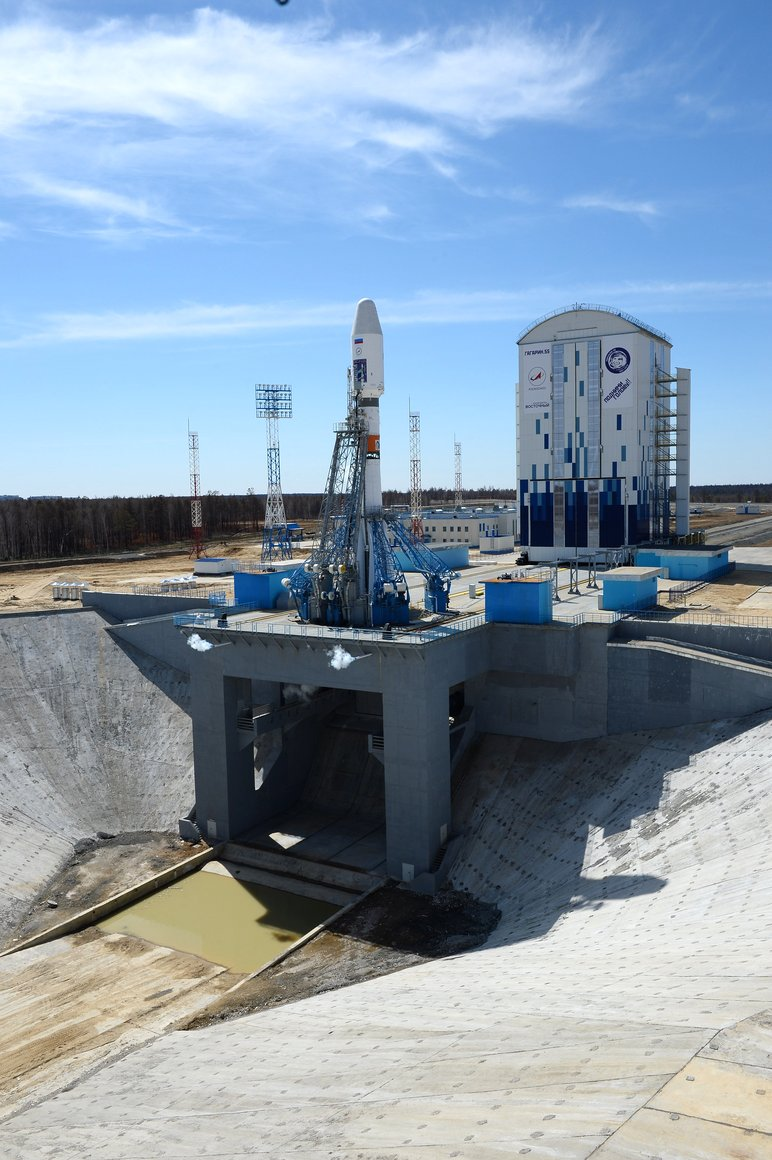
Site 1S with Soyuz-2.1a "Mikhail Lomonosov", 2016

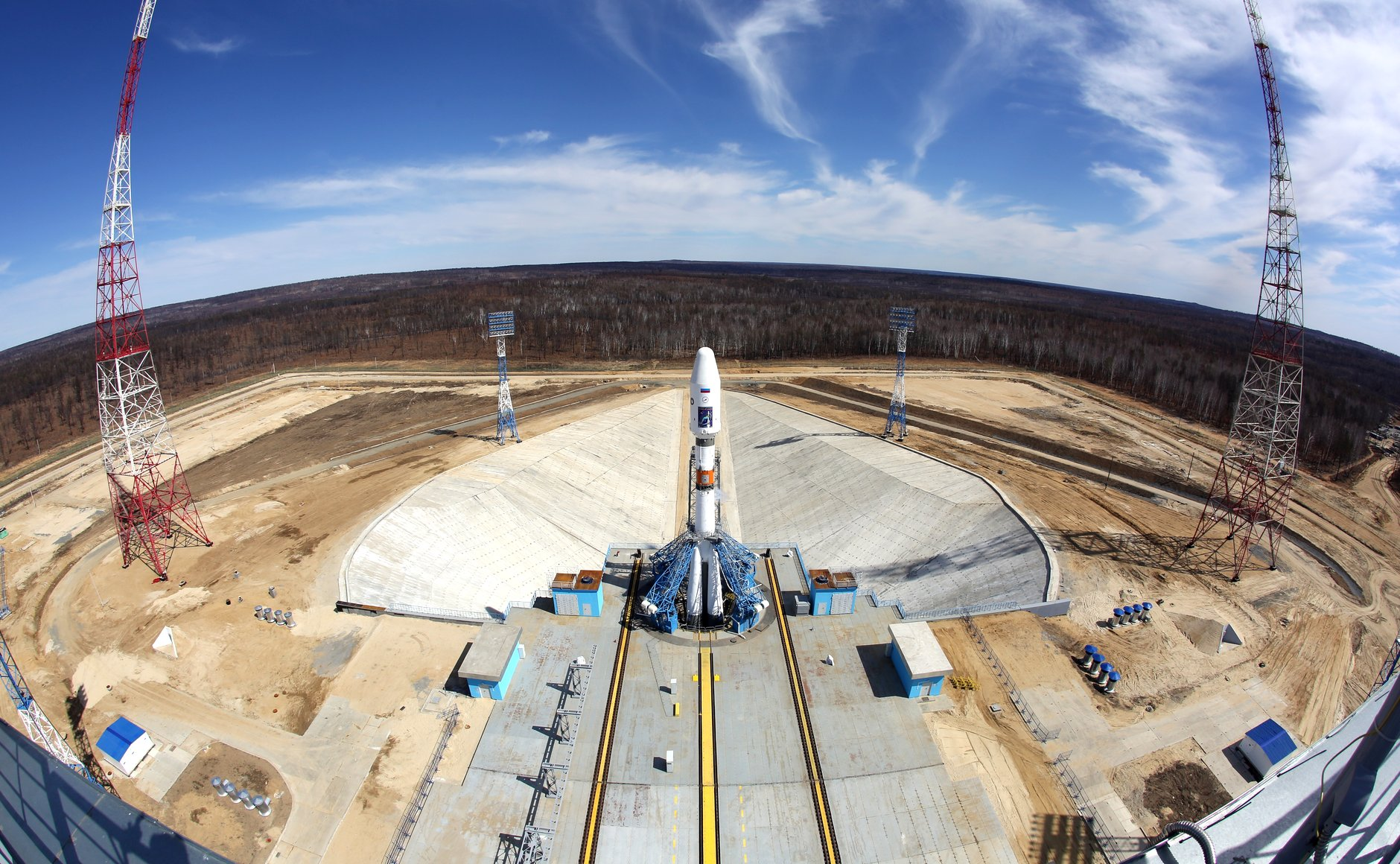
Site 1S with Soyuz-2.1a "Mikhail Lomonosov", 2016

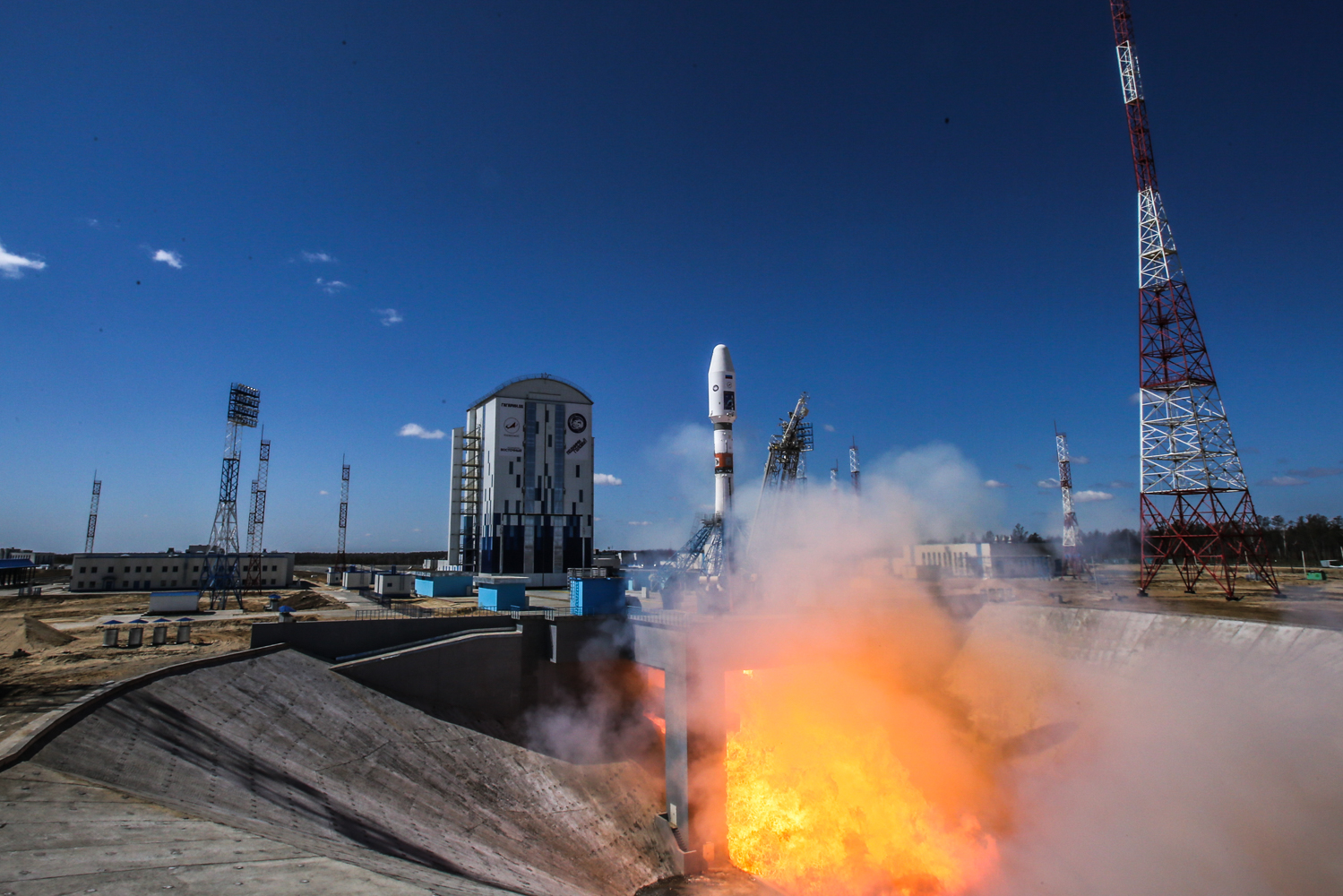
Site 1S, Soyuz-2.1a launch, 2016

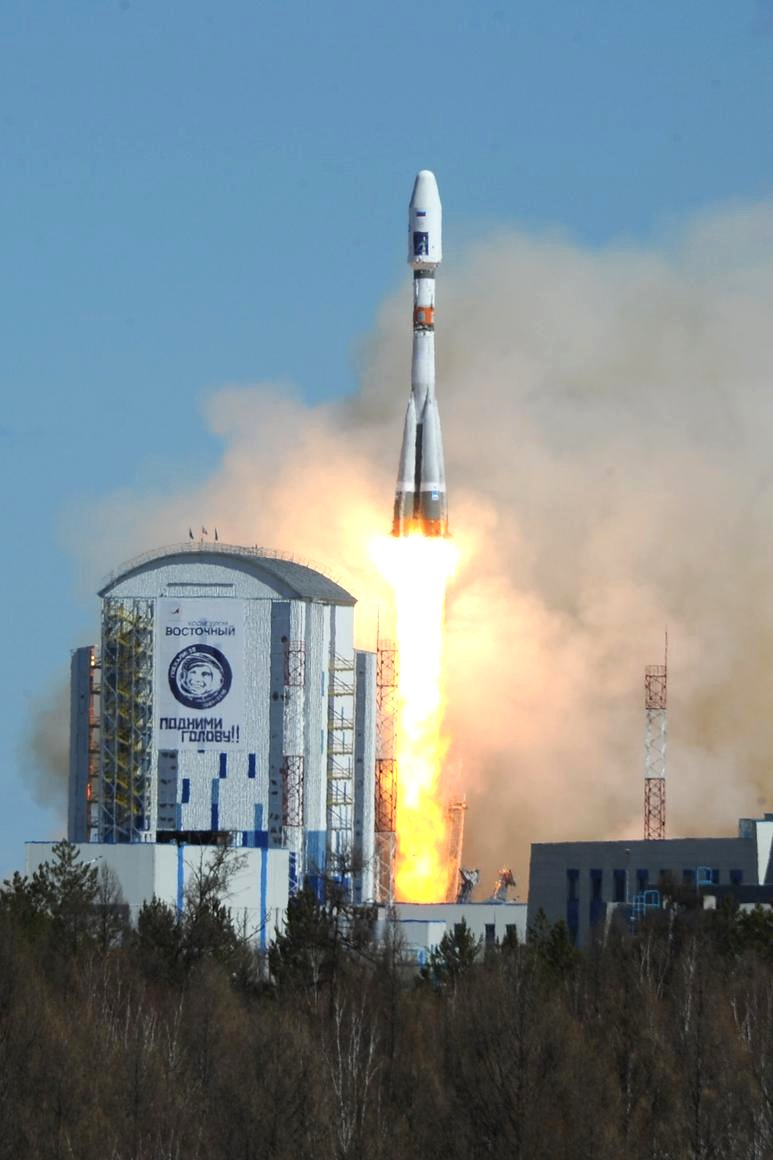
Site 1S, Soyuz-2.1a launch, 2016
Site 1A (Angara)

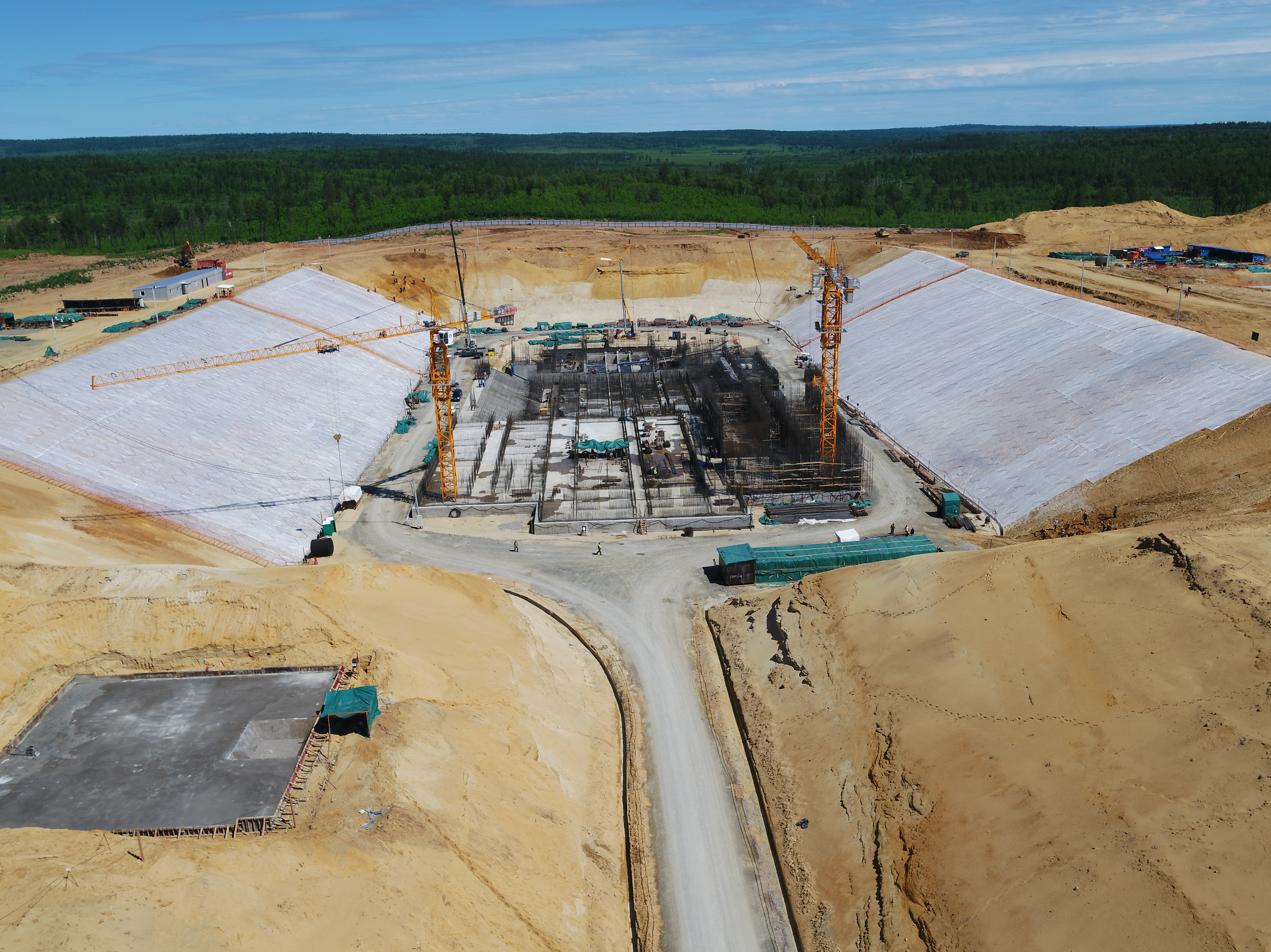
Site 1A under construction

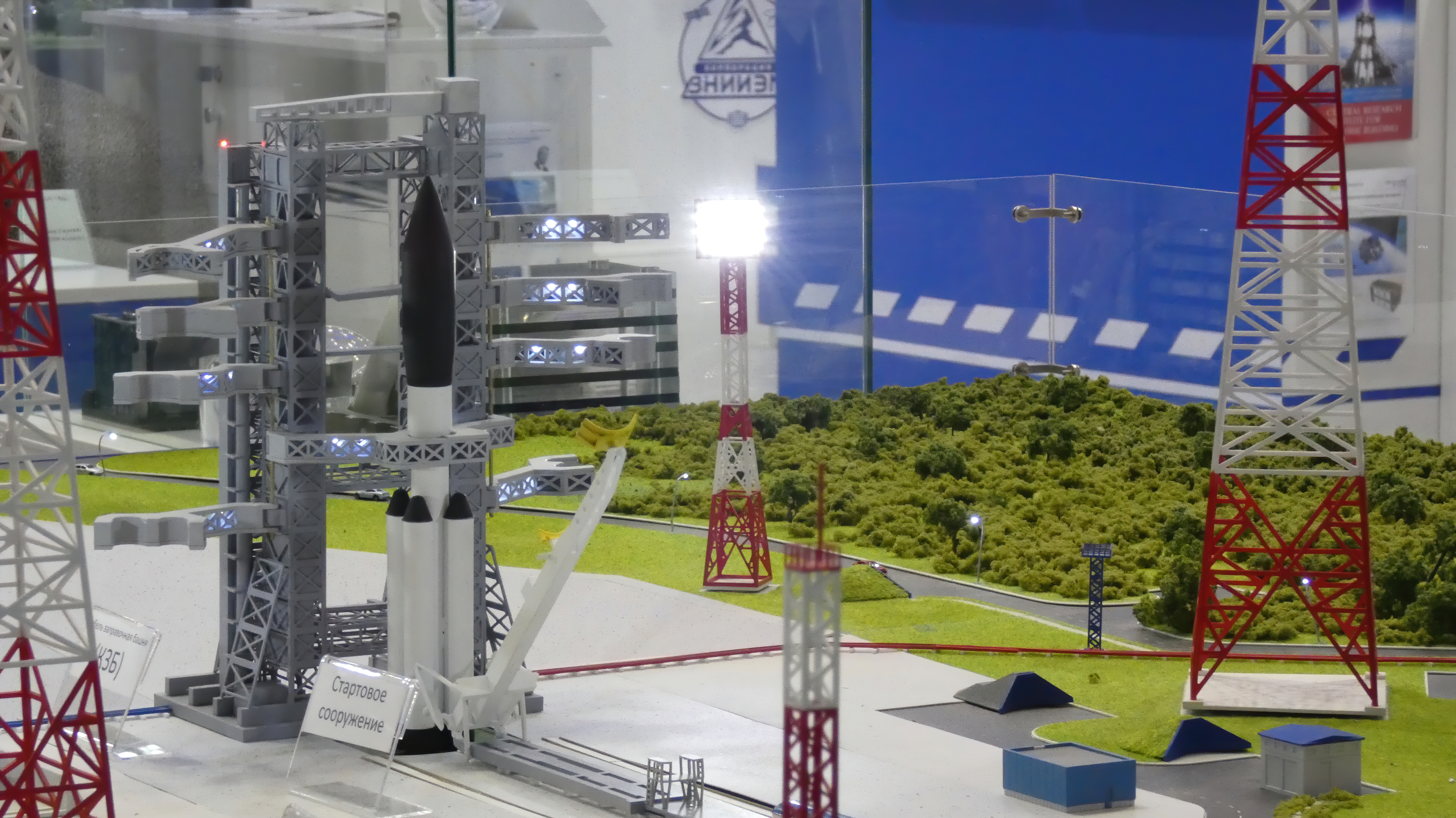
Site 1A proposed layout
