= Nikolai Bryukhanov (engineer) =

Russian engineer

Nikolai Brykhanov
- Born: 13 January 1957 (age 69); Moscow, USSR
- Citizenship: USSR; Russian Federation
- Employer(s): Energia (corporation), S7 Space
- Awards: Order of Friendship, Medal of the Order "For Merit to the Fatherland"

Nikolai Albertovich Bryukhanov (Russian: Николай Альбертович Брюханов, IPA: [nʲikʌɭˈɑj aɭbʲˈertʌvʲit͡ʃʲ brʲu"xˈɑnʌf]; 13 December 1957, Moscow) is a Soviet and Russian spacecraft engineer.

Bryukhanov was deputy chief designer at Energia Corporation in charge of piloted vehicle programmes, notably the Kliper and Orel projects, chief designer of the orbital cosmodrome project at S7 Space, and chief designer of the shuttle programme for RTSS (Reusable Transport Space Systems LLC).

== Life and career ==
In 1980 Bryukhanov graduated from the Bauman State Technical University in Moscow with a degree in Aerospace engineering and joined the Energia Corporation, where he worked his way up from a junior engineer to deputy chief designer responsible for advanced piloted vehicle programmes. Most notably, he spearheaded the Kliper shuttle craft project as well as Parom, or "ferry boat" space tug intended to complement it.

Bryukhanov went on to supervise the Advanced Crew Transportation System which developed into the Orel partially reusable crewed spacecraft, while at the same time overseeing the upgrade of the Soviet space classic, the Soyuz vehicle.

In 2018 Bryukhanov left Energia to lead the pioneering orbital cosmodrome venture of S7 Space as well as its own cargo spacecraft involved in the Sea Launch complex.

In 2020 Bryukhanov took over the role of chief designer for Argo, the shuttle programme of RTSS (Reusable Transport Space Systems LLC).

Bryukhanov is the holder of several patents, most importantly to de-orbiting spacecraft:

- RU 2005140386A «Spacecraft to de-orbit satellite and de-orbiting method»;
- RU 2429991C1 «Device for cargo soft paradropping on landing surface»;
- RU 2010139068A «Method for space vehicle with fixed panels of solar batteries orientation control during experiments on orbits with maximum eclipse period»;
- RU 2010136341A «Method of uniaxial orientation of elongated space vehicle»;
- RU 2010139068A «Method for space vehicle with fixed panels of solar batteries orientation control during experiments on orbits with maximum eclipse period»;
- RU 2005100412A «Method for assembling large-size developable space reflectors and process facility for producing their reflecting surface»;
- RU 2005111509A «Возвращаемый космический аппарат (варианты)»;
- RU 2006102891A «Способ доставки полезной нагрузки в заданную точку космического пространства и транспортная ракетная космическая система для его реализации».

== Awards ==
- Order of Friendship
- Medal of the Order of Services to the Fatherland
- Russian Government Award for Science and Technology
- Russian Government Yuri Gagarin Award for Achievements in Space
