= Sergey Alekseevich Sopov =

Russian spacecraft engineer

Sergey Sopov
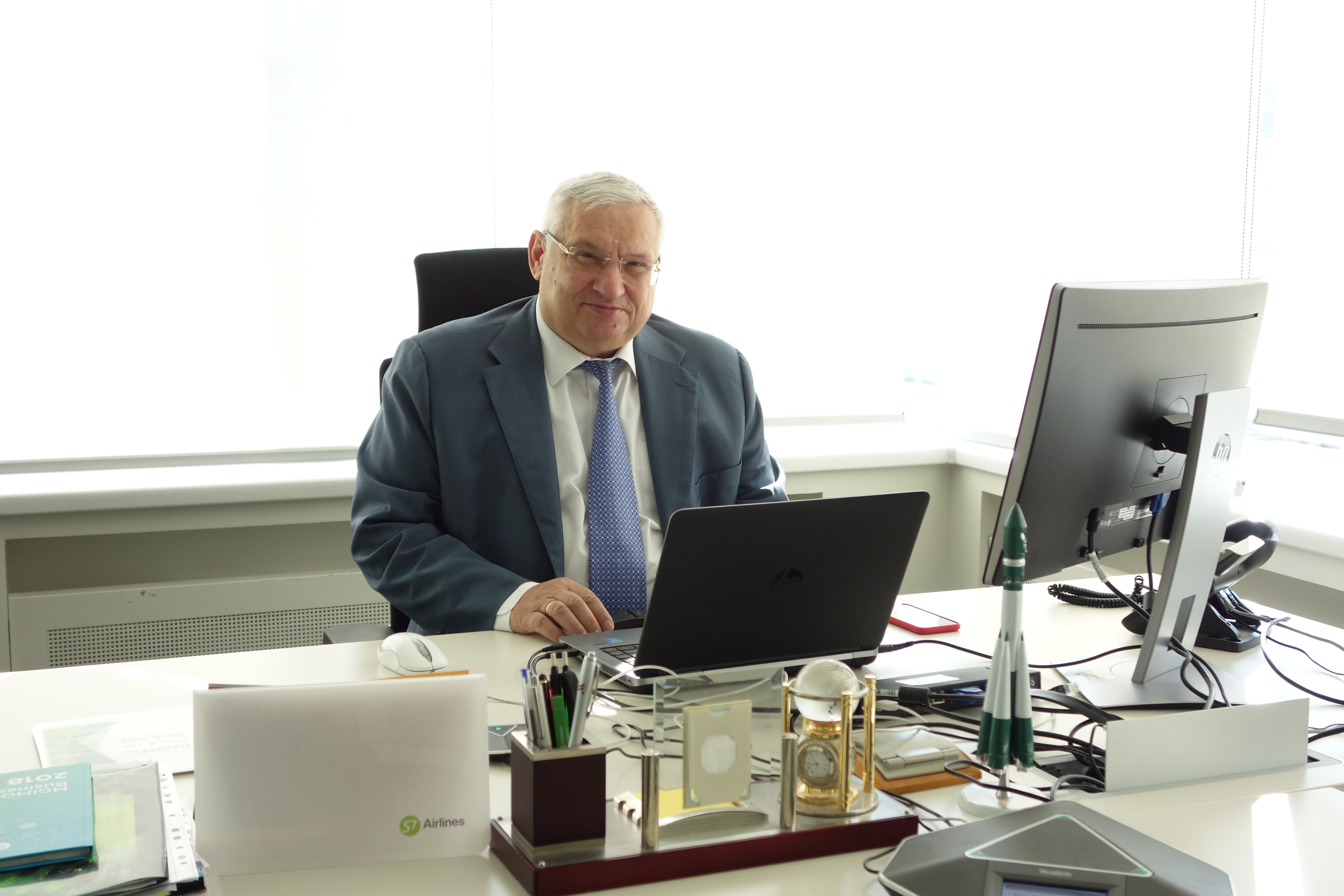
- Born: July 15, 1957 (age 69); Verkhneuralsk, Chelyabinsk Oblast, USSR
- Citizenship: USSR; Russian Federation
- Awards: Medal "For Distinguished Labour", Medal "For Impeccable Service", Jubilee Medal "50 Years of Victory in the Great Patriotic War 1941–1945", "Sergei Korolev Order" of the Russian Space Federation, "Sergei Korolev Medal" of the Russian Space Federation.

Sergey Alekseevich Sopov (Russian: Сергей Алексеевич Сопов, IPA: [sʲɪrˈɡʲej aɭʲiksʲˈejivʲit͡ʃʲ sˈopʌf]; 15 July 1957, Verkhneuralsk, Chelyabinsk Oblast, USSR) is a prominent Soviet and Russian spacecraft engineer and aerospace industry leader, currently serving as CTO at Aspire Space Technologies S.A.

Sergey Sopov was the founder and first head of the Space Research Agency of the Republic of Kazakhstan (1991–1993), CEO of the state aerospace company Coscom (1993–1995), CEO of Avialeasing Aviation Company (1996–2015), one of the designers of Dnepr launch vehicle, CEO of Avialeasing Aviation Company (1996–2015), CEO of Perm Engines Corporation (2001–2013), Head of Sea Launch multinational spacecraft launch company (2015–2019), CEO and co-founder of S7 Space LLC (2016–2019), the person behind Russia’s first private orbital launch (2017) and the country’s reusable space vehicles programme.

== Life and career ==
In 1979, Sergey Sopov graduated from the Perm Higher Military Command and Engineering School (now the Perm Military Institute of Missile Forces) with a degree in Automated Command and Control Systems for Missile Systems.

After graduation, he served at the Baikonur Cosmodrome, where he was responsible for the testing of the unified timing system, the docking system, and the ranging system the Almaz orbital station. He then went on to become Head of Pre-launch automated control systems unit working for the Energia launch vehicle, and thereafter Head of the Systems integration test laboratory of the Energia-Buran programme.

In 1987, Sopov supervised the fuelling of the Energia heavy-lift launch vehicle during its first launch with the Polyus spacecraft. In 1988, he oversaw the launch of the Buran spaceplane as the leader of the team responsible for the preparation and launch of reusable space transportation systems (RSTS) of the Energia-Buran combination. His personal contribution was the development of the procedure for the pre-launch preparation of RSTS systems.

This experience was seminal for Sopov’s novel outlook on the role of reusable spacecraft for the orbital platforms of the future.

In 1991, having moved to Astana, Sopov played a key role in the establishment of the Kazakhstan Space Research Agency and the transfer of the management of Baikonur Cosmodrome to the Kazakhstan government. Subsequently, in 1995, he was responsible for the lease of the Baikonur complex to the Russian Federation.

Sergey Sopov studied with Boris Gubanov, a prominent Soviet engineer and leading designer of the Energia launch vehicle. Jointly with his professor, Sopov designed the Dnepr launch vehicle based on SS-18 missiles. In 2001–2002, Elon Musk attempted to acquire several of these vehicles for his Mars Oasis project. Having failed to find any affordable rockets on offer, he proceeded to create his own launch company now known as SpaceX.

In 1992, Sopov also developed a project of transforming the Kazakh part of Baikonur into an international cosmoport to be used as an international base for reusable space transportation systems. In his innovative vision, Baikonur would be transformed into a planetary space hub open to peaceful initiatives of every nation.

Between 1995 and 2015, Sergey Sopov was the CEO and chairman of the board at Perm Engines Corporation, a leading Russian supplier of aviation engines and spacecraft machinery, as well as CEO and Chairman of the Boart at Avialeasing Aviation Company.

In 2016, Sopov established S7 Space LLC and supervised the acquisition of the Sea Launch complex as well as the new system for the operation of Sea Launch facilities at Long Beach, California.

In December 2017, S7 Space under Sergey Sopov performed Russia’s first private commercial launch at Baikonur: an Angosat 1 communications satellite on a Zenit carrier rocket.

In 2017, Sopov developed the concept of an Baikonur-based Orbital Cosmodrome project, while in 2018 he laid out the main provisions for the implementation of reusable space transportation systems at Baikonur, an endeavour that earned him the Sergei Korolev Order of the Russian Space Federation. The system was designed to consist of ground infrastructure with a launch pad, launch vehicles, a spaceship, an orbital hub, and space tugs. The launch vehicles in question had to be more cost-efficient than the existing Zenit options. The Soyuz 7SL concept design had a reusable first stage and payload fairing. The rocket design team was led by Igor Radugin, formerly of Energia Corporation, while the spaceship programme at S7 Space was spearheaded by Nikolai Bryukhanov.

To further this project, Sergey Sopov established RTSS (“Reusable Transportation Space Systems”) LLC that set out to design a reusable cargo spaceship, Argo, and a methalox-fueled launcher with a reusable first stage. The agreement signed between MTKS and Roscosmos in 2020 was supposed to provide the Russian space program with a new, more efficient workhorse that would have eventually replaced the Soyuz family of launchers. However, the project was put on hold in 2022.

At the moment, Sergey Sopov is engaged in the creation of a new space transportation system as the CTO at Aspire Space Technologies S.A.

== Awards ==
Medal for Distinguished Labour, Medal for Impeccable Service, Sergei Korolev Order of the Russian Space Federation, Sergei Korolev Medal of the Russian Space Federation.
