= Orbital module =

Compartment in space capsules used only in orbit

The orbital module is a compartment of some space capsules used only in orbit. It is separated from the crewed reentry capsule before reentry. The orbital module provides 'habitat' space to use in orbit, while the reentry capsule tends to be focused on the machinery needed to get seated passengers back safely, with heavy structural margins. These have been developed for the Soyuz spacecraft.

== Soyuz orbital module ==
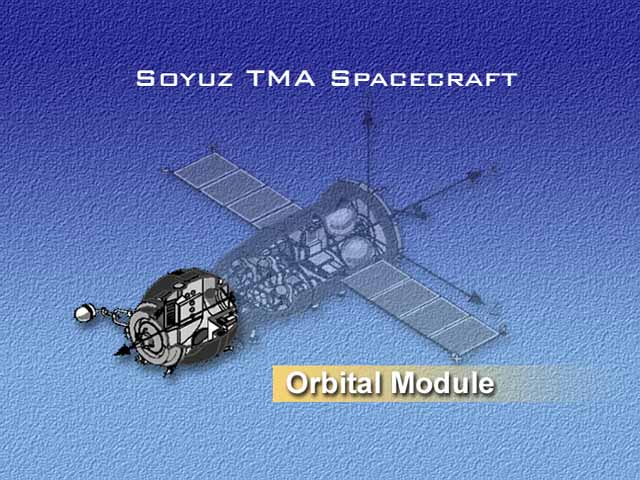
Soyuz spacecraft's Orbital Module

The orbital module is a spherical part of Soviet-Russian Soyuz space capsule series. Designed for use only in orbit, the module does not need to be strengthened to survive re-entry, allowing it to provide more usable space for less weight than other crewed capsule designs.

It serves mainly as a living compartment during orbital flight, and when used as a space station ferry it stores cargo on ascent and is filled with trash which burns up on descent. On early Soyuz missions the module was used for experiments and even as an airlock for the Soyuz 4/Soyuz 5 EVA crew transfer.

== Shenzhou orbital module ==
In the Chinese Shenzhou spacecraft, the orbital module has been upgraded to carry its own solar panels and orbital maneuver system, so it is capable of operating independently as an uncrewed free-flying spacecraft after separating from the reentry module and the service module.

== See also ==
- Reentry module
- Service module
- Space capsule
