= Nikolay Sevastyanov =

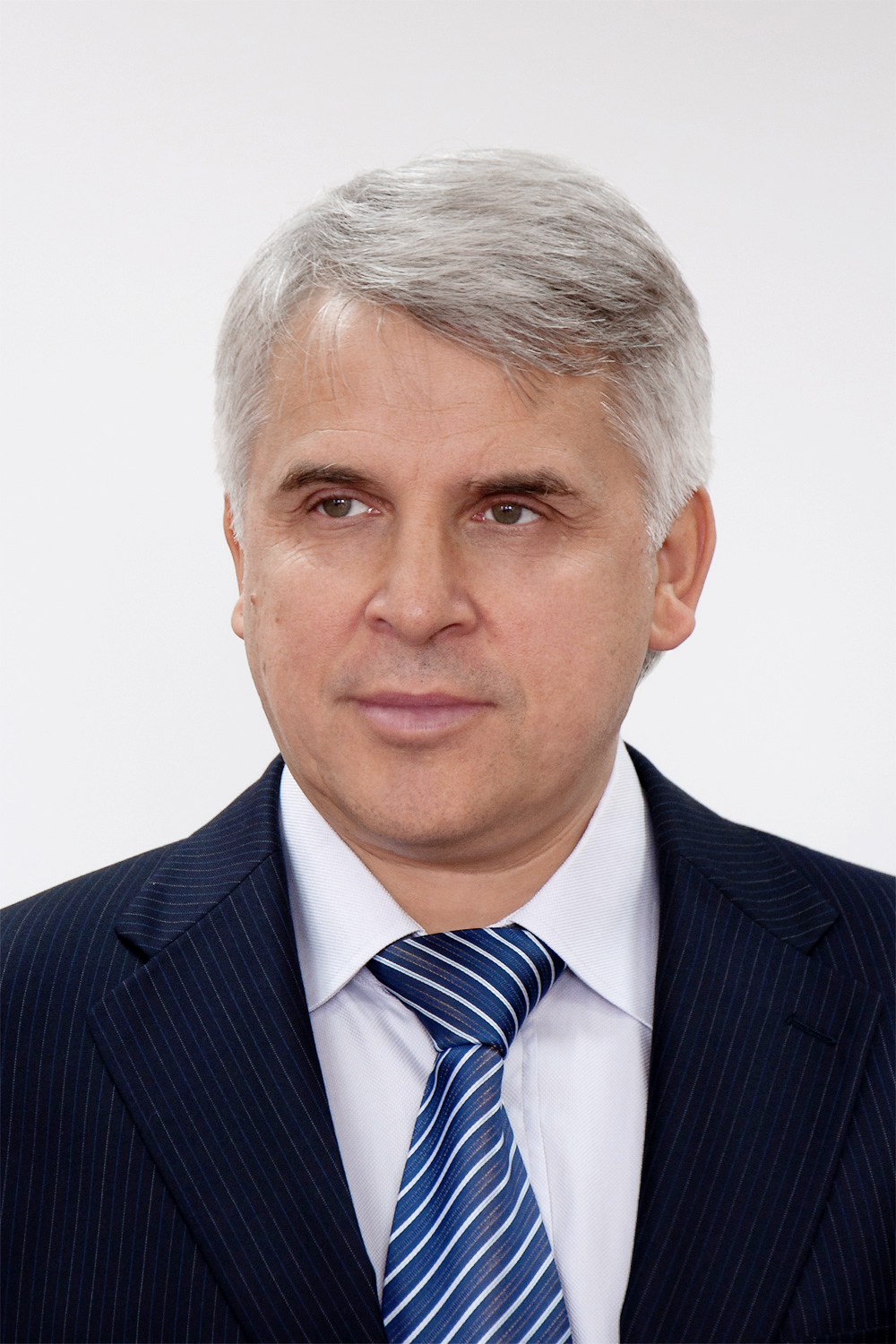

Nikolai Sevastianov (born 1961, Chelyabinsk, USSR (now Russia)) graduated from the Aerodynamics and Space Exploration Department of the Moscow Institute of Physics and Technology in 1984. In 1984 he took a job at NPO Energia as an engineer and rose through the ranks to the position of a deputy general designer. Since 2000 he has been director general of Gascom joint-stock company. In May 2005 – June 2007 he was President of Energia corporation.
