= Command module =

Command module may refer to:

- The Apollo command module, the crew cabin used in the Apollo program designed specifically to return through the atmosphere to a water landing
- The crew module of the Orion spacecraft, designed to function similarly to the Apollo command module
- An electronic control unit used to control a motor vehicle system or subsystem
