= Avialeasing =

Uzbek cargo airline

IATA	ICAO	Call sign
V2	TWN	TWINARROW
- Founded: 1992; 34 years ago
- Hubs: Tashkent International Airport
- Fleet size: 2
- Destinations: 4
- Headquarters: Tashkent, Uzbekistan
- Website: www.avialeasing.com

Avialeasing Aviation Company is a cargo airline based in Tashkent, Uzbekistan. It operates cargo services linking cities in Asia with western and eastern Europe. Its main base is Yuzhny Airport, Tashkent. It is a joint US-Uzbek venture and formed SRX Group in Florida in 1993.

== History ==
The airline was established and started operations in 1992. It was the first private airline in Uzbekistan and is owned by SRX Transcontinental (61%) and Igor Smirnov (39%).

== Services ==
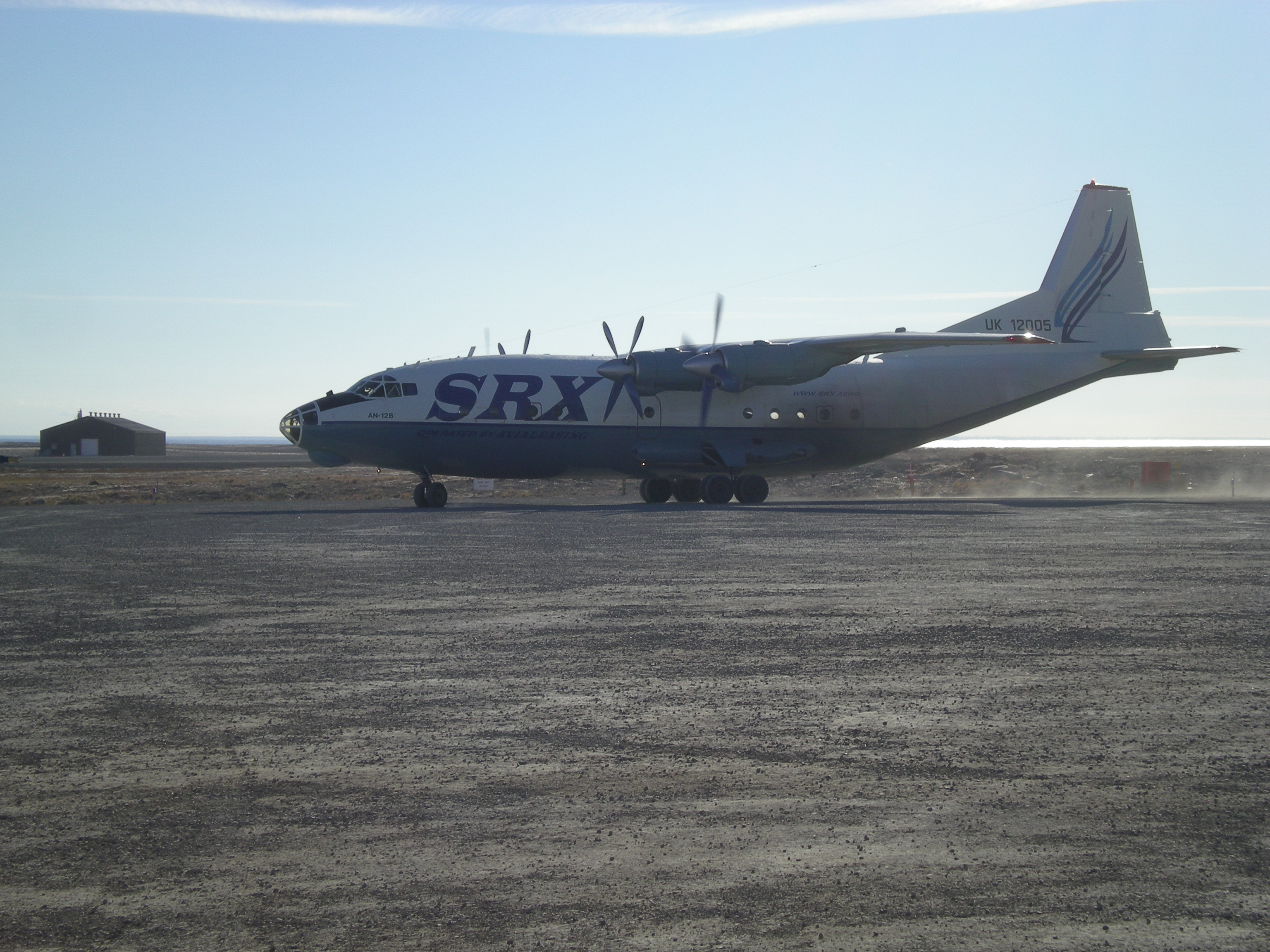
Antonov An-12 UK-12005 taxiing at Cambridge Bay Airport, Nunavut

Avialeasing operates freight services to the following international scheduled destinations (at January 2005):

- Afghanistan
  - Kabul (Kabul International Airport)
- Kazakhstan
  - Almaty (Almaty International Airport)
- Kyrgyzstan
  - Bishkek (Manas International Airport)
- Uzbekistan
  - Tashkent (Yuzhny Airport)

== Fleet ==
The Avialeasing fleet includes the following aircraft (at May 2012):

- Antonov An-26B
- Ilyushin Il-76MD

The airline has also leased out two Antonov An-12B aircraft to SRX Group in Florida.

== See also ==
- List of airlines of Uzbekistan
- Transport in Uzbekistan
