= Argo (Russian spacecraft) =

Russian spacecraft

ARGO
- Designer: MTKS
- Country of origin: Russia
- Applications: ISS logistics
- Website: http://www.rtss.space/argortss?lang=en

Specifications
- Payload capacity

Payload to International Space Station (ISS) (407 km or 253 mi)
- Mass: 2,000 kg (4,400 lb)

Payload to Earth return
- Mass: 1,000 kg (2,200 lb)
- Crew capacity: 0
- Volume: 11 cubic meters of pressurised volume

Dimensions
- Length: 5.6 meters
- Diameter: 4.1 meters

Argo (Russian: Арго) is a proposed Russian reusable cargo spacecraft being developed by Reusable Space Transport Systems (MTKS), a private company.

Its first flight was expected in 2024.

On September 1, 2020, the Russian space agency signed an agreement with MTKS about cooperation in the development of a new spacecraft.

== Design ==
The spacecraft is designed to serve as a reusable cargo vehicle for Russian spaceflight. It will be able to deliver up to 2,000 kilograms of cargo to the ISS and return with 1,000 kilograms of cargo. The full spacecraft mass is 11.5 tons. Cargo compartment volume - 11 m^{3}, spacecraft diameter - 4.1 m, height - 5.6 m.

The tanks of the combined propulsion system (provides maneuvering in orbit, separates before descent) hold up to 1200 kg of fuel, the same capacity as the tanks of the united propulsion system (provides control of descent and landing). 52% of the total mass of the ship's hull will consist of composite elements.

The chairman of the board of directors of MTKS clarified that the post-flight servicing after 10 Argo flights could be carried out directly at the cosmodrome, without transportation of spacecraft to the plant for major refurbishment. The spacecraft will be able to fly and return no less than 20 times.

== Production ==
MTKS plans to produce 4 Argo spacecraft for $136 million. This cost will include their manufacturing, autonomous testing of spacecraft, and all the work before launch, but not the launches.

RSC Energia and TsNIIMash, as well as several other companies, will be involved in the production.

== Flight Profile ==
The cargo spacecraft will be launched on the Soyuz-2.1b rocket, with the potential to launch on the Soyuz-7 or Soyuz-5 rockets in the future.

It will carry up to 2000 kilograms of payload to the ISS, including (according to RBC source) no less than 500 kg of fuel. The RBC source also reported that the company plans to start servicing the ISS no later than 2025, with up to 3 launches per year. Flight time as part of an orbital crewed station - up to 300 days. The ship provides for the possibility of an autonomous flight up to 30 days for research, experimental development, performing applied tasks with the possibility of returning the customer's equipment and cargo to Earth.

It will return 1000 kg of payload from the ISS. The descent is carried out by a ballistic scheme with braking by landing engines which are switched on at a height of 250 m. Landing is carried out on a retractable shock-absorbing shield extended at a height of 100 m.

One full mission with Soyuz-2.1b launch will reportedly cost $69 million.

== See also ==
- Comparison of space station cargo vehicles

=== Comparable vehicles ===
- SpaceX Dragon - Reusable cargo spacecraft
- SpaceX Dragon 2 - Reusable cargo spacecraft
