= Kliper =

Proposed partly reusable crewed spacecraft concept by RSC Energia

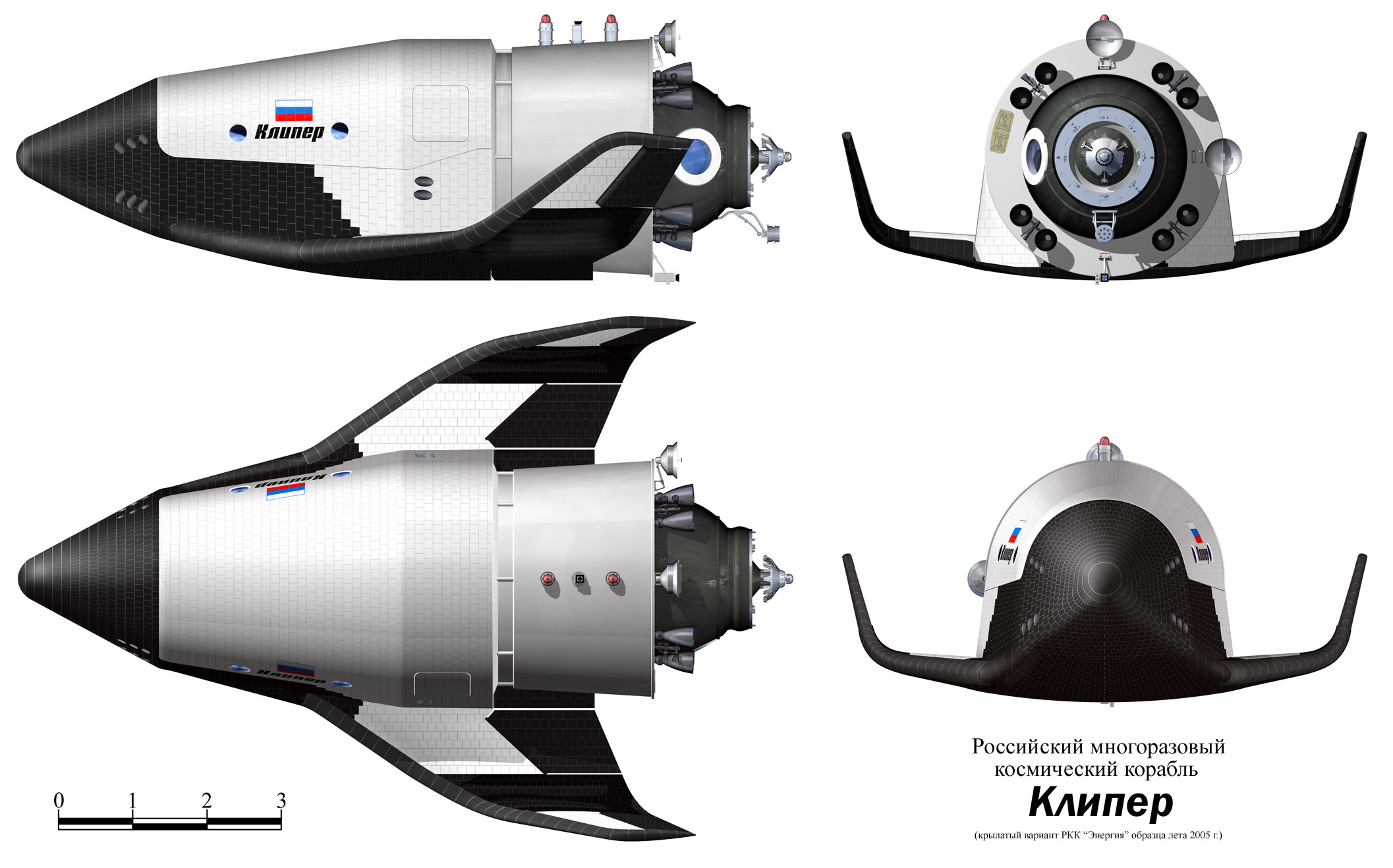
- Kliper spacecraft rendering
- Manufacturer: S.P. Korolev Rocket and Space Corporation Energia
- Country of origin: Russia
- Operator: Roscosmos
- Applications: Crewed spaceplane

Specifications
- Regime: Low Earth
- Design life: 2004 to 2006

Production
- Status: Cancelled (2006)
- Launched: 0

Kliper (Клипер, English: Clipper) was an early-2000s proposed partially-reusable (excluding orbital section and thermal protection shield) crewed spacecraft concept by RSC Energia. Due to a lack of funding from the European Space Agency (ESA) and the Russian Space Agency (RSA), the project was indefinitely postponed in 2006.

Designed primarily to replace the Soyuz spacecraft, Kliper was proposed in two versions: as a pure lifting body design and as spaceplane with small wings. In either case, the spacecraft would have been able to glide into the atmosphere at an angle that produces much less stress on the human occupants than the current Soyuz spacecraft. Kliper was intended to be designed to be able to carry up to six people and to perform ferry services between Earth and the International Space Station.

== Development ==
=== Announcement of the program ===
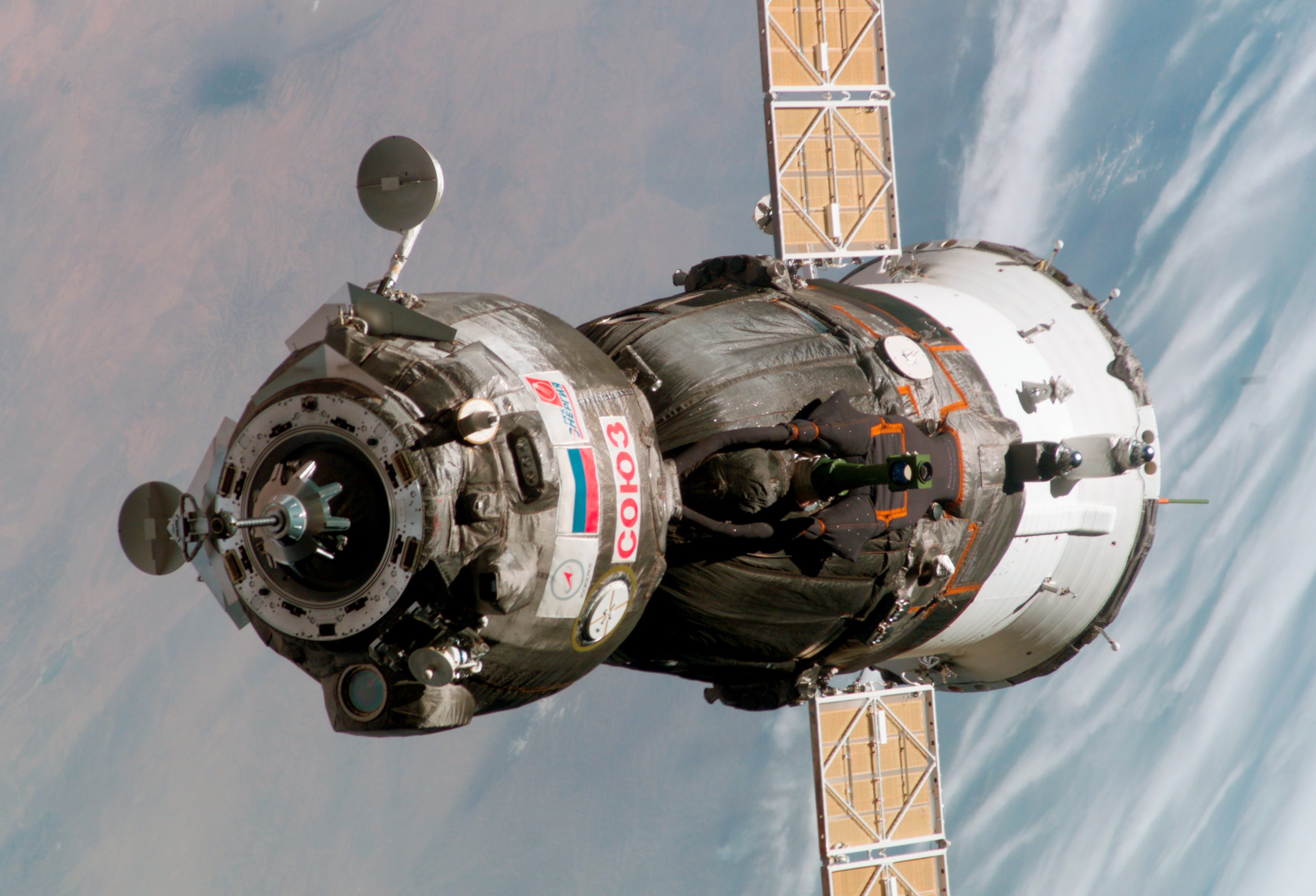
Soyuz TMA-6 spacecraft approaching the International Space Station - the Soyuz spacecraft would have been replaced by Kliper

In February 2004 Nikolay Moiseyev, the deputy director of Russian Federal Space Agency (also known as Roscosmos) told journalists that the Kliper project had been included in the Russian federal space program for 2005–2015. At that point he announced that if the program was implemented successfully, the first launch would take place in five years' time. Kliper had been developed since 2000 and reportedly relied heavily on research studies as well as proposals for a small Russian lifting body spacecraft from the 1990s. Externally its design was comparable to the cancelled European minishuttle Hermes or the NASA study X-38. It was planned to be the successor to the Soyuz spacecraft, which has been built as various versions since 1961.

=== Early search for support ===
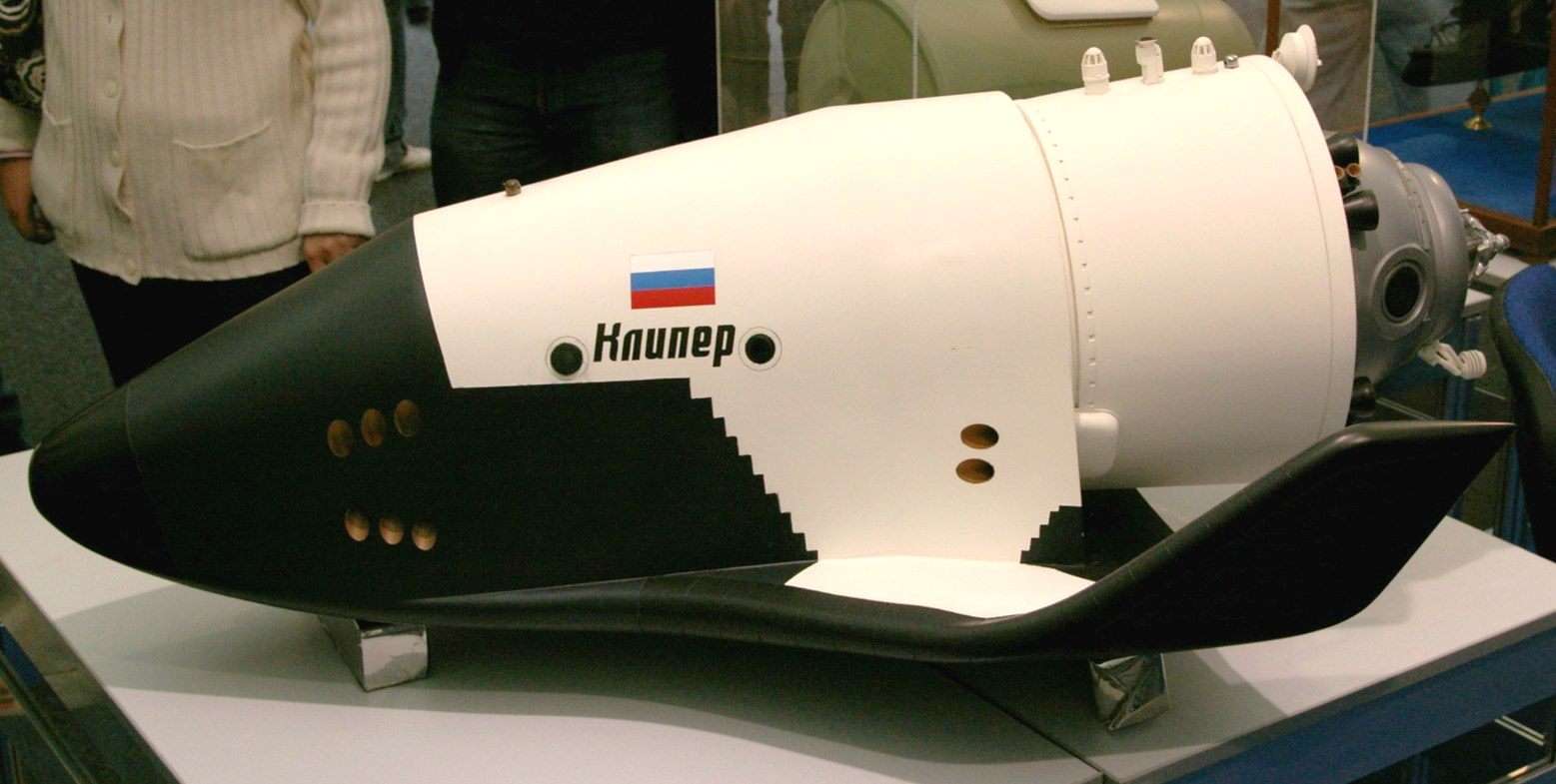
Small scale Kilper model.

In 2005 Kliper was displayed in several air shows around Europe and Asia, in order to recruit international partners to co-fund and co-develop the spacecraft. The Russian Space Agency especially looked to Europe as the European Space Agency (ESA) had become its major partner in space activities during the preceding years. In May 2005, rumours started in the press that Europe would join the Kliper project in a specially funded venture that would be part of the Aurora Programme. These rumours turned out to be correct when both Russian and European space officials announced their intent to cooperate on Kliper during the Paris Air Show in Le Bourget on June 10, 2005.

Vladimir Taneev, the leading designer of the Kliper system, speculated on the contribution of Europe to the project in the following way:

The European companies will likely contribute avionics, materials, and cabin systems. Many different options are on the table, and in the near future we expect to form Russian-European working groups specialized in different subsystems and fields of design.

A further element of this process was made public on October 12, 2005, when various press agencies revealed that JAXA, the Japanese space agency, had been officially approached by Russia to participate in the project. JAXA has made it clear that they are more likely to join the project if ESA does so first, which was in doubt after ESA members rejected a study for Europe's involvement in the Kliper project in December 2005. The addition of Japan would make Kliper a truly multinational project, potentially combining the rugged reliability of Russian launchers with Japanese computer technology. A greater pan-national consensus would have allowed for a lighter funding burden on each participant as well.

=== Estimated costs ===
Announcements and speculations following the February 2004 press conference suggested a development budget of 10,000,000,000 ₽ (about US$400,000,000). In looking at costs for human space travel it was clear that the 10 billion rubles figure was a rather low estimate. In May 2005 The Guardian reported that costs were estimated to be roughly US$3,000,000,000 (for development and construction of Kliper until 2015) of which the bulk of US$1,800,000,000 was speculated to come from Europe. Different sources in 2005 have reported that the money needed for the program would be €1,500,000,000 (about US$1,800,000,000) and on December 12, 2005, an article stated it would be €1,000,000,000 (solely in relation to development costs).

On July 14, 2005, the Russian government approved the national space program for 2006 to 2015 with a budget of 305,000,000,000 ₽ (about US$11,000,000,000). The whole budget for the 10-year period was to have been 425,000,000,000 ₽ (about US$15,000,000,000). The budget included the needed funding for the Kliper program. Thus in face of Europe's denial to fund a €50,000,000 feasibility study for the Kliper project at the European space summit in December 2005, Russian space officials have announced that Russia would fund Kliper even without any European contribution.

The most recent article on Kliper stated that the project would have incurred 16,000,000,000 ₽ (about US$600,000,000) in development costs, 11,000,000,000 ₽ of which will be financed by the government and 5,000,000,000 ₽ by contractors.

=== First launch and target for regular flights ===
In 2004 it was announced that it was likely that Kliper would make its first launch as early as 2010 or 2011, the same time the Space Shuttle was scheduled to be retired. It was reported by BBC News on September 27, 2005, that the first flight tests were planned for 2011, with the first crewed flights in 2012 and the Soyuz being phased out over time until 2014. An article on December 3, 2005 cited the president of the Energia Rocket and Space Corporation Nikolai Sevastyanov that "the first regular lift-off is scheduled for 2012, while a complete transport system will be in place by 2015." After the termination of the Russian Space Agency's tender for a new spacecraft, Energia announced that this would push its Kliper proposal's first flight — if developed at all — back further. In the event, the development project did not continue.

=== ESA's part in Kliper — uncertainty over European cooperation ===
On September 28, 2005, the BBC reported that Alan Thirkettle, head of ESA's Human Spaceflight Development Department, stated that Kliper would be used: "For future exploration, when we have the objective of going to the Moon, it is important to have several possibilities to go there, and within this framework of cooperation to have our own access to orbit around the Moon." In the same context, Alain Fournier-Sicre, head of the ESA permanent mission in the Russian Federation, also stated that: "The objective is to have a vehicle which is more comfortable than the Soyuz capsule which will be used with pilots and four passengers… It is meant to service the space station and to go between Earth and an orbit around the Moon with six crew members."

Although there seemed to be a lot of enthusiasm for Kliper within Alan Thirkettle's team at ESA (as outlined in the above paragraph), on December 7, 2005, the European space summit of governmental officials of ESA member states declined to approve a 50-million-euro two-year study focusing on ESA's potential involvement in the Kliper project. In denying funding for the study ESA members stated that, among other factors that seemed unfavourable, under the current Russian proposal Europe would not share control over the design of the program and would be limited to being a small industrial contributor.

Jean-Jacques Dordain, ESA's Director General, put the refusal to fund the study into context: "It is not a question of member states for and member states against. I think the decision could not be taken for reasons that are not linked to Clipper itself. The decision could not be taken because of budgetary restraints." Dordain concluded that he was convinced that European support for Kliper was vital for ESA's future involvement in space transport and that a favourable decision can be achieved until June 2006. In concluding "We need two transportation systems in the world", Dordain also outlined shortly after the European Space Summit that the primary requirement of Europe's involvement in the Kliper project was to rely on two separate systems to support the ISS as had been proven vital after the Columbia Space Shuttle disaster in 2003.

Dordain's remarks were echoed by Daniel Sacotte, ESA's director of human spaceflight, microgravity and exploration, in saying simply that "The Russians are not going to finance it, we will finance it from our side", despite adding a cautionary note that "We needed the support from at least two states out of France, Italy and Germany. We didn't get it." What this means in practical terms remains to be seen; ESA officials are still pushing for Europe's involvement in the Kliper project.

Very negative comments relative to Kliper were brought by the various national delegations at the December meeting, in particular by the French Minister of Research François Goulard. In short, there remain for the time being member states strongly committed to Kliper, and others just as strongly opposed. The long-term view remains uncertain.

=== Russian Space Agency's tender for Kliper ===
At the end of 2005, Roskosmos announced that a tender for Kliper would be held in January 2006 between RKK Energia, Khrunichev and Molniya with a selection date of February 3, 2006. Concerns about the bids led to a delay in the process, with a resubmission deadline of March 2006 and selection was rescheduled for April 2006. Following further delays, the tender was cancelled on 18 July 2006.

In late July 2006, the Russian Space Agency and the European Space Agency agreed to collaborate on a different project to develop a new spacecraft. They decided to fund a study under a program labelled Crew Space Transportation System (CSTS) which started in September 2006 and evaluate a capsule type concept, derived from Soyuz. While this program is the follow-on project of the RSA's and ESA's collaboration on a new space vehicle, this program is no longer connected to Energia's winged Kliper design.

RSC Energia continued to pursue the project without Russian government support and announced that it would seek private investment for the craft. News reports in Russia indicated that Kliper was still expected to be ready for Russian Space Agency test flights around the year 2012. The project was officially halted in June 2007, after the biggest proponent of the project, Nikolai Sevastyanov, was dismissed from the position of the president of RSC Energia. The newly appointed president of RSC Energia, Vitaly Lopota, confirmed that Kliper would not be displayed at the 2007 MAKS air show. He said that Energia would spend more time on the project analysis, perform additional dynamic modeling, revise the design and appearance and then would come up with new proposals for Roscosmos.

In 2008 Vitaly Lopota shared his vision for the new Russian spacecraft. He mentioned two possible options: a space capsule, better for missions to the Moon and Mars, and a lifting body design for low Earth orbit missions. According to his new plans, instead of Kliper, the new Orel capsule would be developed from 2009 to 2017–2018.

== Design ==
Given the Russian Space Agency's preference for Energia's lifting body proposal this part of the article concentrates entirely on Energia's design for Kliper.

=== Overview ===
Kliper's design was another attempt to solve the geometric problems of spacecraft. Soyuz has an Orbital Module, a hollow sphere, to be used for eating and hygiene, and an airlock located above the Reentry module (the capsule), with the docking mechanism at the top. In the event of an emergency, it would be lifted away from the rocket along with the reentry module, and the fairing over the spacecraft was designed to successfully split apart either circumferentially just below the reentry module in such an emergency or longitudinally if the flight should be successful. Kliper was designed with the Orbital Module below its reentry module, and the docking mechanism below that. This was made possible by constructing a reentry module broader than the orbital module, so that a pair of rocket nozzles for orbital maneuvering could have been fitted alongside it, as the later Salyut space stations had.

In connection with this new design, Kliper would feature a launch escape system that would enable it to detach from the carrier rocket if an abort of the mission during orbital ascent is required. An abort would be possible during every phase of the launch with the limitation of the first seconds after launch.

=== Lifting body design ===
On return from space, Kliper's lifting body design would not only allow a smoother descent into Earth's atmosphere than the capsule design, such as Soyuz; but also permit control. RKK Energia claimed that the craft would be able to land in a predetermined one-square-kilometre area. Artistic impressions showed that the Kliper would have resembled a cylinder topped by a cone. Originally, landing proposals involved both a landing by parachute and as an alternative, in a modified version, a landing on a runway similar to an aircraft, or the Space Shuttle. Leading designer Vladimir Daneev commented on this issue in June 2005:

We are 99% sure that it will be a spaceship with upturned little wings, enabling the Kliper to land on any class-one military airfield with a runway from three to three and a half kilometres in length.

Kliper, as a vehicle alone, would have been primarily a crewed spaceship, carrying six cosmonauts and payloads of up to 700 kilograms (mostly experiments and other equipment used for carrying through experiments in orbit) and was planned to stay in orbit for approximately 15 days independently and for up to 360 days if docked to the International Space Station. This highlighted both the Russian/European and the American change in space transportation philosophy. Rather than focusing on the lifting of cargo and a crew, in the same way as the Space Shuttle or Buran, the Russian space agency adopted a 'people first' philosophy with the aim of 'bolting' extra capabilities for more advanced missions onto Kliper at a later date. Each orbiter was intended to make 25 flights prior to retirement.

=== Using a space tug ===
In late 2005 Kliper's design was changed again. In order to fit the Kliper on the planned upgraded version of the Soyuz-2 rocket, labeled the Soyuz-2-3, Kliper would be 'split up' into two spacecraft, the Kliper crew vehicle and Parom (rus. "ferry"), a space tug. Parom would have been a permanent orbital spacecraft awaiting Kliper in orbit, docking with it and then providing orbital manoeuvering and boosting Kliper to higher orbits in order to dock with the International Space Station. The Parom was planned to be indefinitely reusable, refueling itself via the cargo container, space station, or spacecraft that it is attached to.

== Missions ==
The Kliper program was proposed as the Russian-European counterpart to the American Orion Spacecraft and was therefore designed (similar to the Orion) to be part of a modular system that enabled it to be both a LEO-shuttle type vehicle as well as part of a spacecraft able to go beyond Earth orbit to the Moon and even Mars (there were outline suggestions of lunar applications in September 2005). The modular design would have included the Kliper crew module and - depending on the mission - a mission module or propulsion module. Although far-fetched, this corresponds to announcements by the Russian Space Agency that according to a lunar mission study, using the Soyuz, a landing on the Moon could be achieved within the next decade.

Information on Kliper's beyond LEO mission capabilities were expanded further by RSC Energia, with a picture released in December 2005 of what a possible Kliper interplanetary configuration might have looked like. The design was entirely theoretical but made for a view of where RSC Energia saw the Kliper operating, and how it might have done so. This configuration was unlike anything seen so far for a crewed space vehicle, with the solar arrays needed for electrical power vastly bigger than the habitable volume at the centre. It was also unclear what the mode of propulsion was. The very large solar array suggested an ion propulsion system might have been contemplated for such a mission, though it might also simply be that there was another reason for such a large array, such as increased power for better telemetry transmission rates over large distances.

== Carrier rockets ==
The present Soyuz rocket would not be able to lift Kliper into low earth orbit, because the spacecraft (the version designed without Parom) was expected to weigh between 13 and 14.5 metric tons (with payload and crew) whereas Soyuz only has a lifting capacity of around 8 metric tons. It was originally planned to heavily enhance the Soyuz rocket - a project that was labelled the Onega rocket or Soyuz-3. Until late 2005 it was much more likely that Kliper would have used an Angara-A3 rocket, which was scheduled to make its first launch in 2012 (the Angara program has been delayed and Angara-A3 may not be developed in light of the funding of the development of Soyuz 2–3) or possibly a Zenit rocket that is built in Ukraine.

At the end of 2005, Kliper's design was changed again (as outlined above) and the most likely solution for a carrier rocket became the Soyuz 2-3, an upgraded Soyuz 2 rocket. This enhanced Soyuz should have been able to launch Kliper into space because of weight reduction resulting in the use of the Parom as a space tug.

With regard to launch sites for Kliper, further information became available as of October 2005, with a planning-stage declaration from Nikolai Moiseev, deputy director of the Russian Space Agency that Kliper could have been launched from ESA's Guiana Space Centre in French Guiana. Though this aim had already been suggested, the comment was made in the context of facility upgrades for Kourou that are already under way since 2003 and expected to be finished in 2007 with the first launch of a Soyuz rocket from French Guiana in 2008. It had been suggested that Kliper could have been launched from both Baikonur and Kourou, by Alan Thirkettle, head of ESA's human spaceflight, microgravity and exploration directorate, in December 2005.

== See also ==
- Orion (spacecraft), the American counterpart program
- Orel (spacecraft)
- MAKS (spacecraft)
- Shuttle-Derived Launch Vehicle

== In the news ==
- July, 2006 - RSC Energia: Concept of national manned space navigation
- April, 2006 - Russian Space - Manned Spaceflight To Be Cost-Efficient
- February 14, 2006 - Kliper choice delayed
- January 31, 2006 - Energia holds lead in Kliper contest
- January 18, 2006 - Tender to build new-generation spaceship has started. (in Russian)
- December 9, 2005 - ESA vows to clinch cash for shuttle
- December 9, 2005 - Europe keen to join Russia in new spaceship project
- December 6, 2005 - Europeans Unlikely to Back Russia's Manned Space Vehicle
- November 1, 2005 - A lighter version of Kliper (which would work in combination with the Parom space tug) is under consideration by RSA and ESA
- October 12, 2005 - Japanese Space Agency confirms its invitation to participate in the project
- October 6, 2005 - Short note concerning the RSA's outline intention to use the Kourou launch site for Kliper
- September 28, 2005 - ESA chiefs release more information on the collaboration
- August 21, 2005 -- ESA and Russia collaborate on Kliper
- July 15, 2005 -- Europeans take on NASA
- June, 2005 -- Report on the Paris Air Show, partly about Kliper (in Russian)
- June 17, 2005 -- Spectrum article on Kliper at Le Bourget
- June 15, 2005 -- Article in the Pravda over the European-Russian partnership with Kliper (English)
- February 15, 2005 -- Article in the Pravda on planned Kliper exposition at Le Bourget'2005 airshow
- September 2004 -- Mosnews - Russia Prepares Launch of New Space Shuttle -- (with image of barebone Kliper)
- April 2004—Energija's Nikolaj Brjuchanov and ESA's Joerg Feustel-Buechl on Kliper in ARD (German TV) (in German)
