= Orel (spacecraft) =

Planned reusable crewed spacecraft

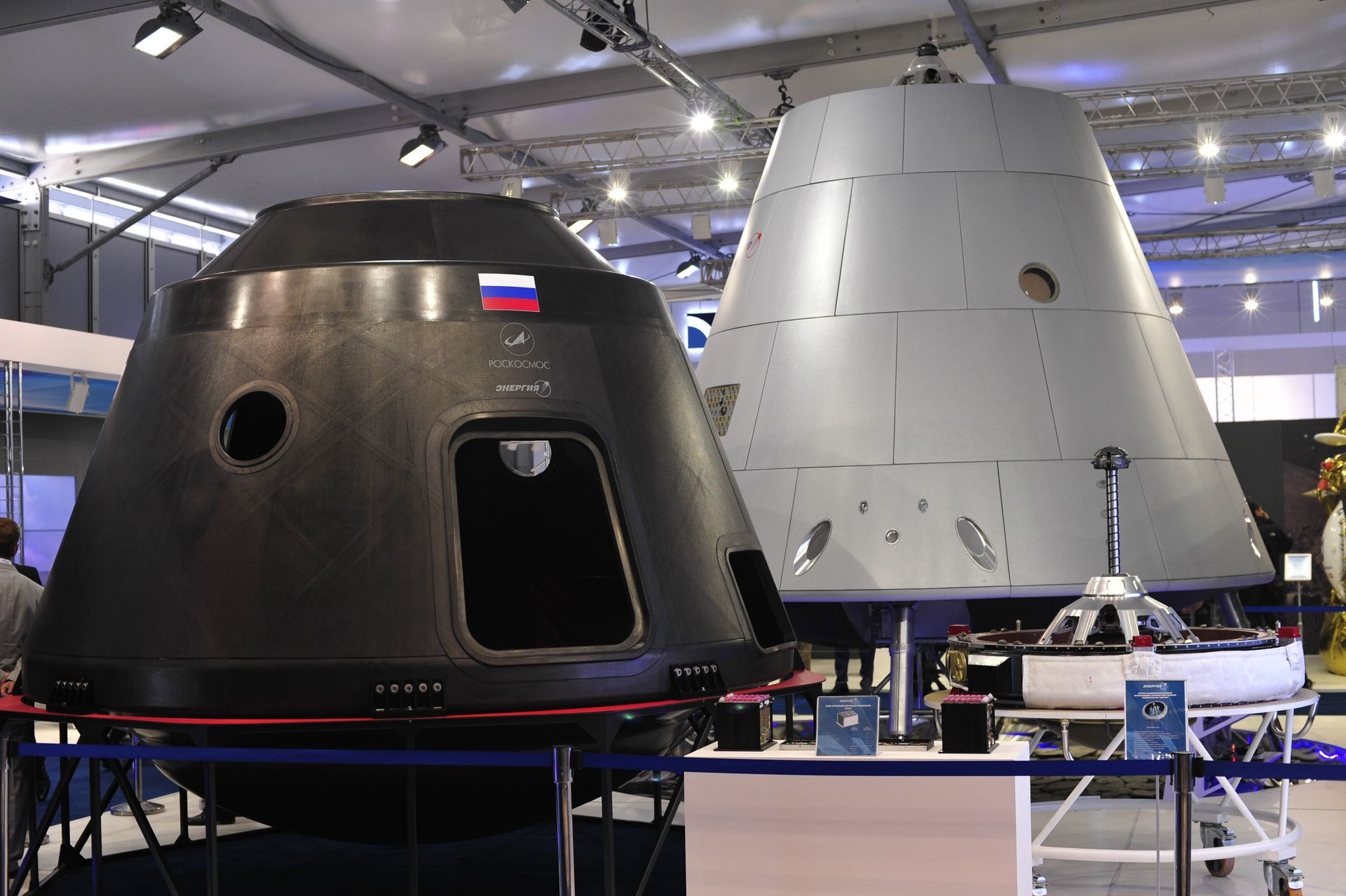
- Mockup and test article of the Orel crew module, photographed at the Moscow Air and Space Show in August 2015
- Manufacturer: RKK Energia
- Country of origin: Russia
- Operator: Roscosmos
- Applications: Crew transportation to Low Earth orbit and to the Moon, possibly to Mars

Specifications
- Launch mass: 17,000 kg (LEO)–21,367 kg (Moon)
- Dry mass: 14,000 kg (crew module 9,500 kg, propulsion module 4,500 kg)
- Crew capacity: 4–6
- Volume: 18 m^{3}
- Regime: LEO, TLI, Lunar orbit
- Design life: Planned: 5–30 days (free flight); 365 days (docked in LEO); 200 days (docked in Lunar orbit)

Production
- Status: In development
- Maiden launch: Planned: 2028 (robotic); 2028 (crewed); 2030s (uncrewed lunar orbit)

Orel (Russian: Орёл, lit. 'Eagle') or Oryol, formerly Federation (Russian: Федерация, romanized: Federatsiya), and PPTS (Russian: Перспективная Пилотируемая Транспортная Система, romanized: Perspektivnaya Pilotiruemaya Transportnaya Sistema, lit. 'Prospective Piloted Transport System'), is a project by Roscosmos to develop a new-generation, partially reusable crewed spacecraft.

Until 2016, the official name was (Russian: Пилотируемый Транспортный Корабль Нового Поколения, lit. 'New Generation Piloted Transport Ship') or PTK NP. The goal of the project is to develop a next-generation spacecraft to replace the Soyuz spacecraft developed by the former Soviet Union to support low Earth orbit and lunar operations. It is similar in function to the US Orion or Commercial Crew Development spacecraft.

The PPTS project was started following a failed attempt by Russia and the European Space Agency (ESA) to co-develop the Crew Space Transportation System (CSTS). Following ESA member states declining to finance Kliper in 2006 over concerns about workshare then again declining to finance development of CSTS in 2009 over technology transfer to Russia that could be used for military purposes, the Russian Federal Space Agency ordered a new crewed spacecraft from Russian companies. A development contract was awarded to RKK Energia on 19 December 2013.

Orel is intended to be capable of carrying crews of four into Earth orbit and beyond, with different mass versions suitable for 5, 14, or 30 day missions. If docked with a space station, it could stay in space up to a year, which is double the duration of the Soyuz spacecraft. The spacecraft will send cosmonauts to lunar orbit, with a plan to place a space station there, called Lunar Orbital Station.

== History ==
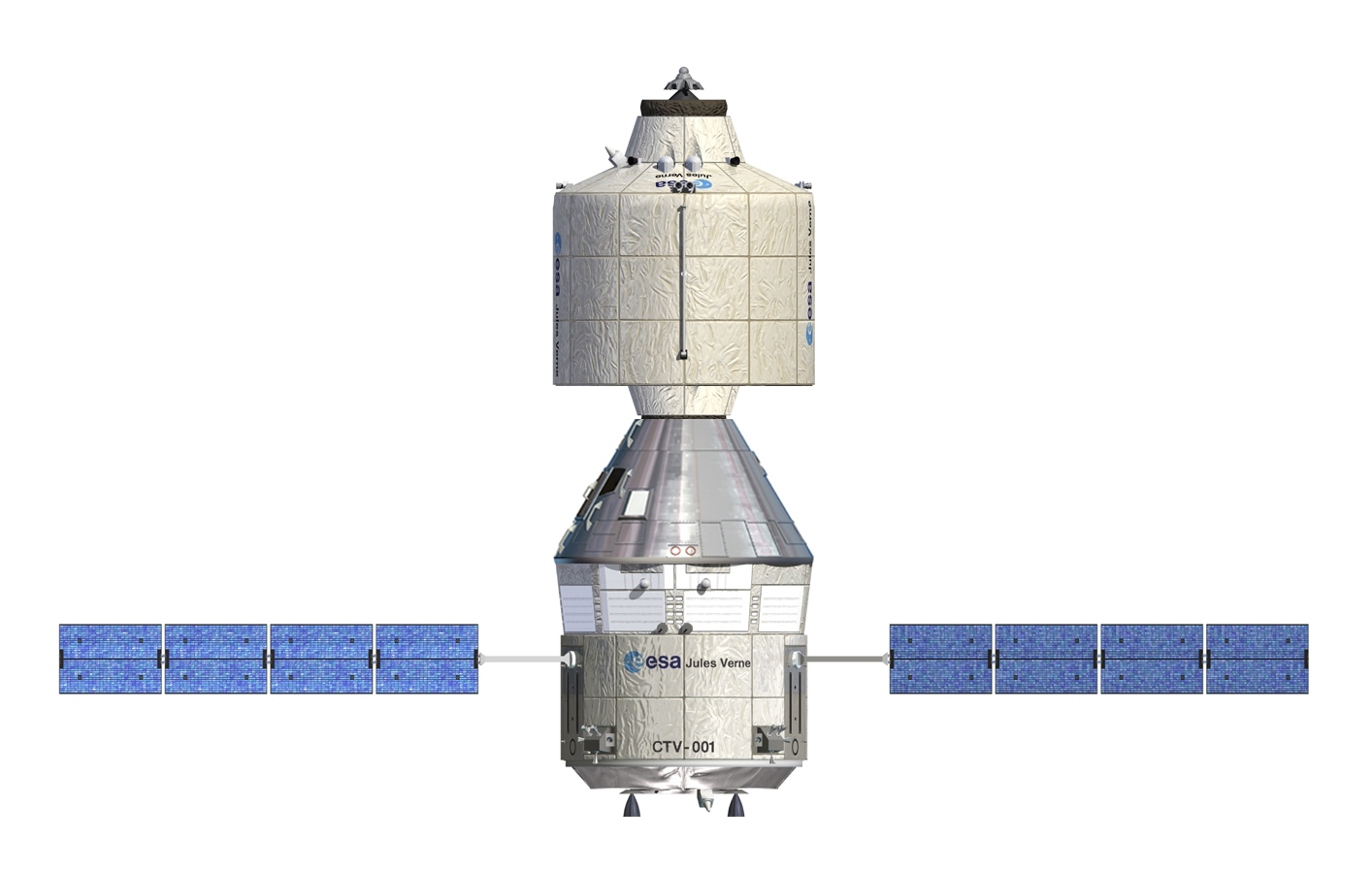
Formerly proposed CSTS design.

Previously, ESA officials had inquired whether they could be part of the Constellation Program of the United States, with NASA focused on its Orion spacecraft, but they had received a negative response. Consequently, Europe decided to join the Russians to co-develop a new-generation crewed spacecraft. ESA insisted on a joint design rather than the Russian-designed Kliper, and as a result the joint Russian/European CSTS project came into being. CSTS had completed an initial study phase, which lasted for 18 months from September 2006 to spring 2008, before the project was shut down before an ESA member state conference in November 2008. ESA decided to use some technology of the CSTS project from its Automated Transfer Vehicle.

The Russian space agency, Roscosmos, had repeatedly received proposals from Moscow-based Khrunichev enterprise to develop a new-generation crewed spacecraft based on the TKS spacecraft that would be launched on the new Angara launch Vehicle. Citing the requirement to start work on a new crewed spacecraft, Russia decided to go forward with the project by itself.

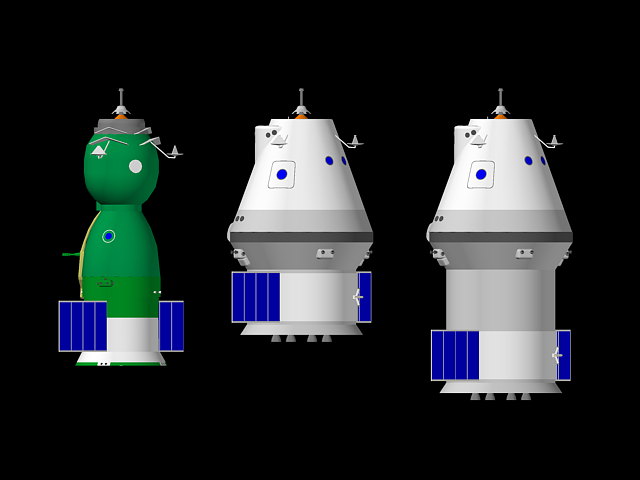
From left to right, the Soyuz spacecraft, CSTS for low Earth orbit missions, ACTS for lunar orbit missions.

By the first quarter of 2009, Roscosmos had finalized its requirements for the next-generation crewed spacecraft and had received proposals from both RKK Energia and Khrunichev enterprise. This was the actual beginning of the PPTS project. The agency was finally ready to name the prime developer of the vehicle. Formally, only two organizations which were practically capable of developing crewed space vehicles competed in the government tender to build the new spacecraft—RKK Energia in Korolev and Moscow-based Khrunichev enterprise.

Although Roscosmos has remained tight-lipped about the project, a number of Russian officials made statements hinting about various stages of the project. On 21 January 2009, the head of Roscosmos, Anatoly Perminov, told Rossiyskaya Gazeta, a Russian newspaper, that Russia would likely proceed with independent development of the next-generation crewed spacecraft. According to Perminov, the agency and its main research and certification center—TsNIIMash—had already conducted an expanded meeting of the Scientific and Technical Council, NTS, examining follow-on transport systems, including the next-generation crewed ship. It would be followed by a government tender to select a developer for the new vehicle. Perminov further indicated that the new spacecraft would be expected to enter service within a time frame of the Orion spacecraft, but a more detailed development plan would be ready with the preliminary design of the vehicle in the middle of 2010.

In the first quarter of 2009, Roscosmos released requirements which were used in the development of the Technical Assignment to the industry working on the PPTS project. The preliminary development of the project was expected to take place from March 2009 until June 2010 at an estimated cost of around 800,000,000 rubles ($24 million). The work apparently covered only an Earth-orbiting version of the spacecraft, while laying the foundation for later lunar-orbiting spacecraft, or even a Mars-bound crew vehicle.

The agency's general requirements asked the industry to develop a vehicle of "foreign" standards in its technical capabilities and cost, while at the same time using existing technologies as much as possible.

In November 2019, it was announced that the first test flight was scheduled for 2023, and the first crewed flight for 2025. A reusable cargo version is planned, to replace Progress.

As of August 2023, the first uncrewed and crewed test flights are expected to occur in 2028.

== Preliminary design ==
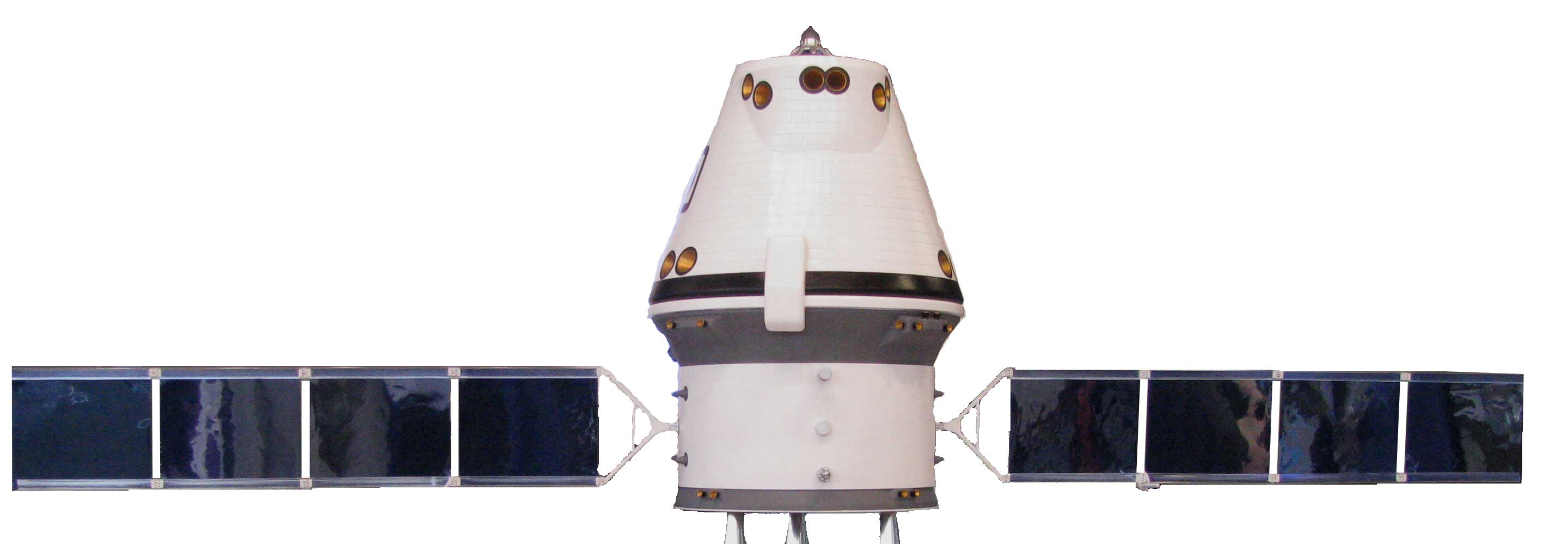
Formerly proposed PPTS design

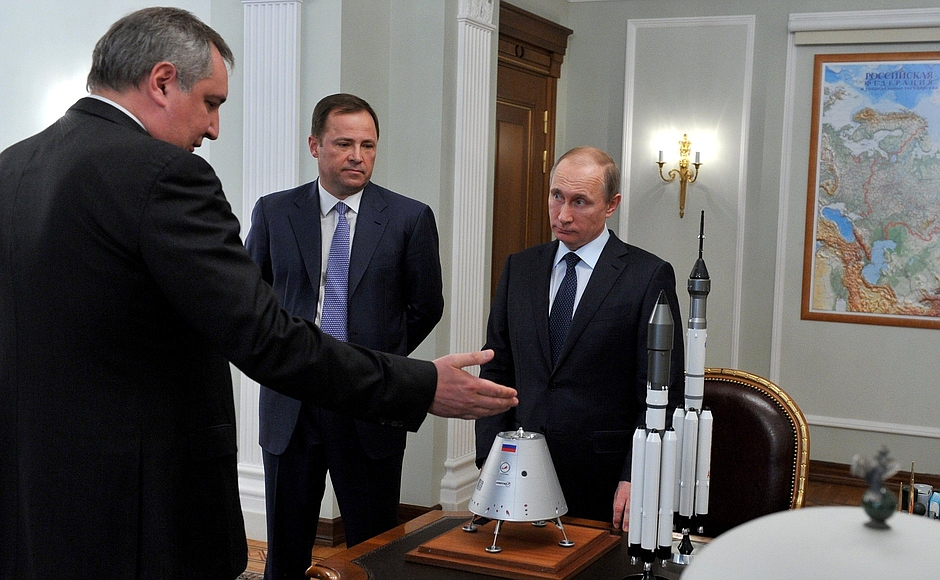
Rogozin, Komarov and Putin with mock-ups of the spacecraft and rocket Angara A5 (2015)

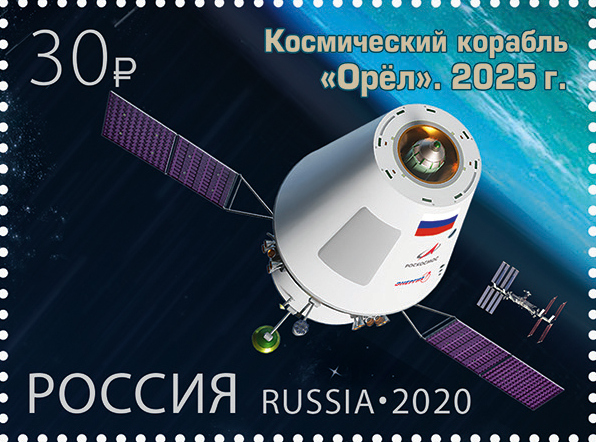
Orel on a 2020 Russian postage stamp

Roscosmos has envisioned several versions of the spacecraft, configurable for low Earth orbit, lunar, and uncrewed missions.

Information on the proposed spacecraft released in 2009 indicated that the Earth-orbiting version of the ship would have a mass of 12 tonnes and carry a crew of six, along with no less than 500 kg of cargo. It would be able to fly 30-day-long autonomous missions, or a year-long mission, while docked to the ISS in the orbit, with the inclination 51.6 degrees, and to the future Russian space station launched from Vostochny into a 51.8-degree orbit.

The lunar version would weigh 16.5 tonnes, have four seats, and be capable of delivering and bringing back 100 kg of cargo. It would be able to fly 14-day missions to orbit around the Moon, or stay docked to the proposed Russian Lunar Orbital Station for up to 200 days.

The uncrewed cargo version of the vehicle would be required to carry no less than 2,000 kg to Earth orbit, and return at least 500 kg back to the planet's surface.

As of March 2009, Roscosmos made the requirement for crew capsule landing accuracy to 10 kilometers, while directing the developers to continue work on various modes of high-precision landing. Emergency escape and landing capabilities were mandated for every phase of the mission and were to provide for the survivability of the crew until the arrival of the rescue and recovery teams.

The vehicle, like Soyuz, would be wingless and be able to conduct fully automated and manual docking, and have sufficient propulsion capabilities during transport missions to dock and re-dock with orbital assets and then provide for the reentry and safe return of the vehicle to Earth. The reentry capsule design requirement specified that only environmentally safe propellants could be used during the atmospheric phase of the flight. Roscosmos reserved the option of making the crew module of the spacecraft reusable, reckoning that a cone-shaped capsule could possibly fly up to 10 missions during a 15-year lifespan.

It has been suggested that the vehicle may use only rocket thrusters to slow itself down during its landing, unlike the Soyuz reentry module which relies on a parachute to slow its descent, and uses solid propellant motors only to soften its touchdown.

== Launch vehicle ==
=== Rus-M ===
A formal industry-wide tender for the development of the crewed launch vehicle to launch PPTS was initiated at the beginning of 2009. Although the agency delayed the announcement of the winner, many unofficial sources in Russia maintained that TsSKB Progress, based in Samara and KB Mashinostroenia, would lead the development of the new rocket. It was believed that the launch vehicle, named Rus-M, would feature a common core stage and a variable number of boosters, each equipped with powerful RD-180 engines, burning a mix of liquid oxygen and kerosene. The engine was originally developed by Moscow-based NPO Energomash for the US Atlas V rocket and its performance to date has been impressive. The second stage was expected to sport a pair of RD-0124 engines, currently in use on the Soyuz-2 rocket. Thus, both stages would have been equipped with existing engines, greatly reducing the cost and the risk to the overall project. In October 2011, it was announced that the Rus-M program was being canceled.

=== Angara ===
Various Angara rocket designs

In July 2012, it was reported that the Angara A5 will be used as the new launch vehicle for Orel. As of August 2023, the first uncrewed launch of Orel is expected in 2028. The spacecraft will be carried by an Angara A5 from Vostochny Cosmodrome.

== See also ==
- Colonization of the Moon
- Mengzhou (spacecraft)
- Orion (spacecraft)
