= CSTS =

Former proposed design for a crewed spacecraft for low Earth orbit operations

ACTS (Advanced Crew Transportation System) CSTS (Crew Space Transportation System)
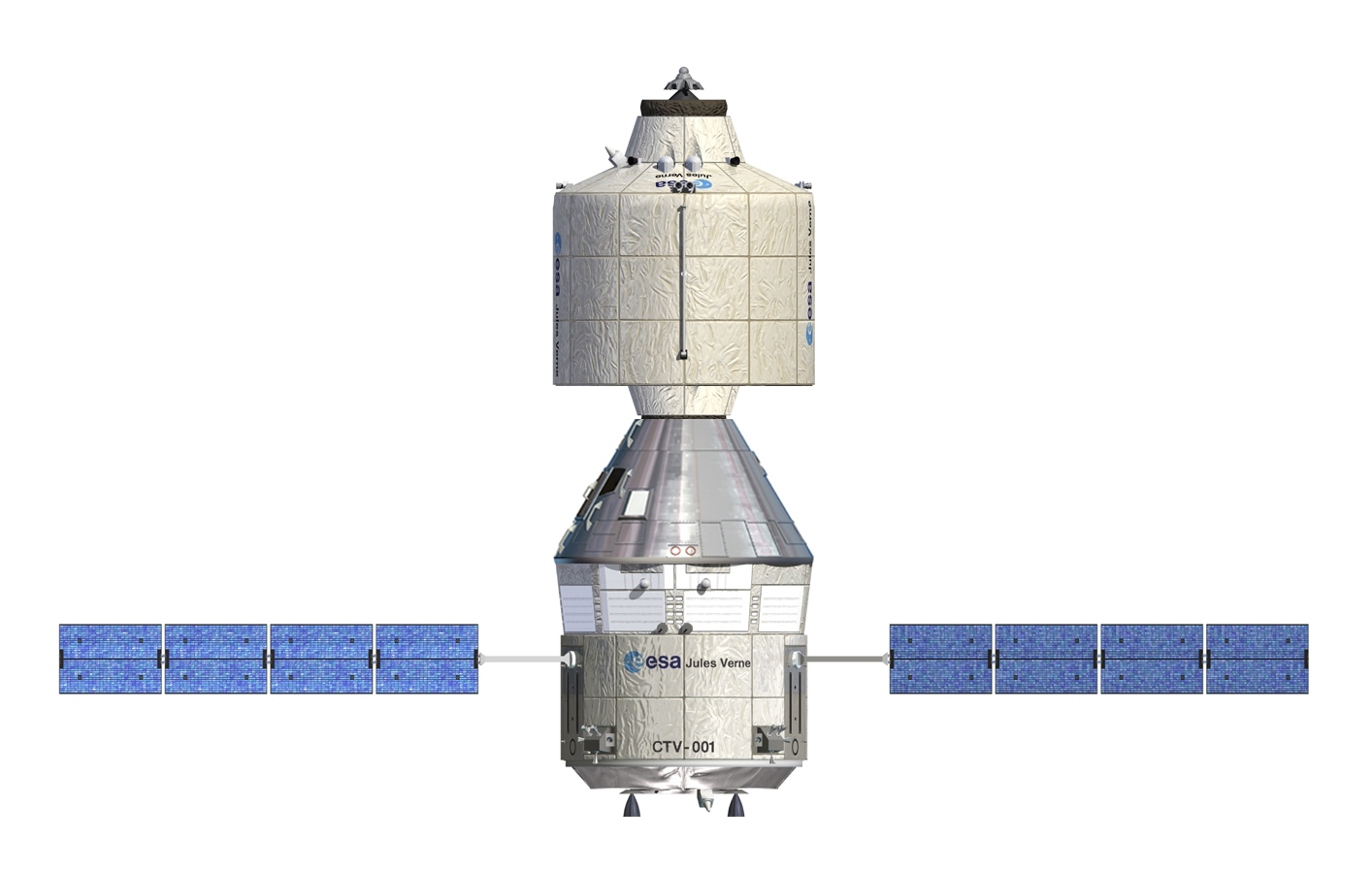
- Proposed CSTS design (spring 2008)
- Manufacturer: RKK Energia, EADS Astrium
- Country of origin: ESA member states, Russia
- Operator: Russian Federal Space Agency, European Space Agency
- Applications: Carry cosmonauts and astronauts to orbit and back (main goal) possible future improvements for beyond-LEO missions (additional goal)

Specifications
- Regime: Low Earth orbit (main operations) circumlunar spaceflight (proposed beyond-LEO operations)

Production
- Status: Study phase completed and project cancelled

Related spacecraft
- Derived from: Automated Transfer Vehicle evolution variant
- Derivatives: Orel

Crew Space Transportation System (CSTS), originally Advanced Crew Transportation System (ACTS), was a proposed design for a crewed spacecraft for low Earth orbit operations such as servicing the International Space Station, but also capable of exploration of the Moon and beyond. It was a joint project between the European Space Agency (ESA) and the Russian Federal Space Agency (Federal'noye kosmicheskoye agentstvo Rossii – FKA).

The project was conceived as a basic strategic plan to keep a viable European human spaceflight program alive after the US space agency NASA declined the ESA's request to participate in the American Orion spacecraft project. Meanwhile, the ESA had been in talks with the FKA aimed at the two organisations collaborating on the development of Kliper, which was to be a replacement for Russia's venerable Soyuz spacecraft. After NASA's decision, in mid-2006 the FKA and ESA agreed to cooperate on the ACTS, with funding limited to a feasibility study for a launch of an actual vehicle possible no earlier than 2017; the name of the proposed vehicle was then changed from Advanced Crew Transportation System to Crew Space Transportation System. The study phase of ACTS/CSTS was completed and submitted to a conference in November 2008 of ESA member states. As no further funding was allocated at the conference, the project was shut down. The ESA decided to develop the upgraded crewed version of ATV. In mid-2009 EADS Astrium was awarded a €21 million study to design the crewed vehicle.

When a plan for a crewed version of the ESA's Automated Transfer Vehicle (ATV) cargo spacecraft was announced a few months before the decision to shut down the CSTS project was made, the head of the ESA denied that it was an alternative to the CSTS, saying there were ongoing talks as to whether to continue funding the CSTS project.

In 2009, Russia decided it would proceed with developing a version of the original design of the CSTS, which became the Orel spacecraft.

In early 2013, the ESA and NASA began cooperation on developing the European Service Module for the current version of the Orion spacecraft. This cast previous ESA efforts concerning a crewed derivative of the ATV spacecraft into uncertainty. As of summer 2015, no known new developments on the ACTS/CSTS project had been disclosed to the public.

== Background ==
=== ACTS as an answer to the Orion ===
In 2004, U.S. President George W. Bush announced the Vision for Space Exploration, a program that included the United States’ return to the Moon by 2020 and a crewed mission to Mars by 2030. For these purposes the Crew Exploration Vehicle (CEV) was to be developed (the CEV was a competitive design assessment process, the outcome of which was the Orion spacecraft). European Space Agency (ESA) officials inquired whether they could be part of this program for exploration, however received a negative response. In May 2006, the ESA's General Director Jean-Jacques Dordain stated with regard to this rejection by NASA, "I have been told by Mike Griffin and [John] Marburger that the CEV is not for international cooperation. But if Europe is not involved in the next-generation transportation systems, we will stay forever a second-class partner."

In a July 2006 interview with New Scientist, NASA Administrator Michael Griffin however suggested interest in international cooperation in the general context of NASA's Moon exploration plans. "The US will return to the Moon but we think we will do it better, that it will be more rewarding for all, if it [sic] can do it in the company of as many of our ISS partners as we can, and with new partners." In this statement Griffin spoke of general cooperation, not a specific cooperative effort in developing the Orion, the actual vehicle to be used for Moon missions, which would be an entirely American built spacecraft.

=== Cooperation with Russia ===
Since 2004, the ESA had been in talks with the Russian Federal Space Agency (FKA) on cooperation for the development of Kliper, the Russian successor project to the Soyuz spacecraft, which had been in service since 1967 (and as of 2026 remains in service). While the ESA's management was enthusiastic about this cooperation, their member states turned down funding for a design and collaboration study in December 2005, mainly because certain member states felt that the ESA would just be a minor industrial contributor to the program, while Russia would actually develop and design the Kliper spacecraft.

On the Russian side, the concept of Advanced Crew Transportation System, ACTS, conceived as a sort of "Euro-Soyuz", emerged during 2006, when Russian authorities realized that their proposal to replace the Soyuz with the Kliper was too ambitious in terms of funding.

After the December 2005 rejection of Kliper by the ESA, Jean-Jacques Dordain emphasized that a collaboration with Russia on a new spacecraft could still be decided in June 2006. This rejection by the ESA notwithstanding, Kliper was a Russian program that could still have been funded entirely by the FKA – although this was unlikely if Russia and Europe would really have gone forward with the ACTS concept together.

== Study ==
On 13 June 2006 the press reported that the winged Kliper project had been replaced by a study, that the ESA would fund, to develop a capsule under the Advanced Crew Transportation System program.

Reasons given for choosing the ACTS over Kliper included that the former would offer Europe the possibility to be a full partner in a Russian-European program, because the modular structure (see below) allowed for a division of design responsibilities between the partners (for instance, Russia could be in charge of the overall design of the reentry capsule, while the ESA worked on the habitation module etc.).

About €15 million was pledged for the CSTS program at the ESA's regular meeting on 21–22 June 2006. Further funding of the study was to have been asked for at the next ESA meeting in July. Both partners, the FKA and the ESA, would have borne their own costs in the first two years of the program. "We are now entering a phase of working with the Russians where we will establish a preliminary design of the vehicle, establish all the legal framework for the operation, delineate the work share for the parties, and outline the aspects of development," said Manuel Valls, head of Policy and Plans Department in the ESA's Directorate of Human Spaceflight, Microgravity, and Exploration Program.

On 4 July 2006, Russian media reported that the head of the FKA, Anatoly Perminov, had met with Jean-Jacques Dordain to discuss the CSTS proposal; however, no agreement was signed between the Russians and Europeans as a result. Two weeks later on 18 July, Perminov announced that the Russian request for tenders for the Kliper spacecraft had been cancelled, as none of the submitted tenders were satisfactory.

On 25 July 2006 Jean-Jacques Dordain announced that the collaborative study together with the FKA on the ACTS spacecraft would begin that September and end early in 2008, "So in eighteen months' time we will have got [sic] a proposal to make to our ministers for the development of such a vehicle." It was confirmed that the ESA's financial contribution to this study would be €15 million, shared among seven ESA member states. The work areas of the study were:

- preliminary system design examining the vehicle's configuration
- detailed subsystem design including a docking mechanism
- development of co-operation mechanisms and agreements, as well as workshare decisions for a full-scale development
- crewed lunar flights

On commencement of the study, the name of the proposed vehicle was changed from Advanced Crew Transportation System to Crew Space Transportation System (CSTS).

The study phase of ACTS/CSTS was completed and submitted to a conference in November 2008 of ESA member states. As no further funding was allocated at the conference, the project was shut down.

=== Overall design ===
After the initial study phase was completed in May 2008, the FKA and the ESA announced that the overall design chosen was a conical crewed capsule with an ATV-derived service module. The CSTS spacecraft should have had a total mass of 18,000 kg. However, the capsule and service module combined mass may have been less.

The CSTS followed the format of the Russian Soyuz craft by having a separate descent/ascent module and a detachable orbital module. The proposed descent module somewhat resembled the American Apollo spacecraft command module while the orbital module resembled a man-rated version of the ATV.

=== Possibilities of missions beyond LEO ===
Manuel Valls, head of Policy and Plans Department in the ESA's Directorate of Human Spaceflight, Microgravity, and Exploration Program noted in June 2006 on the question of available launch vehicles for the CSTS spacecraft that "although nothing at this stage is definitive, [...] both the Russians and we think that it is only prudent, and most efficient and effective, to go with two stages and not one. The one-stage has been done already with Saturn V and Apollo. To do that now would entail the development of quite a new launcher and that will take time and money like hell, if I may say. Going with two stages is far more effective [...] because we could use – and this is our intention – existing launch vehicles or launch vehicles with minimal development." This means that CSTS would have had a tight mass budget, as only launchers with a maximum payload capacity in the class of Ariane 5, Proton or Angara would be available for a launch. With two launches and low Earth Orbit (LEO) docking this meant that CSTS together with an Earth Departure Stage would not be able to weigh more than about 45 to 50 tonnes in LEO (note however that this is just for the lunar spacecraft, a lunar lander is not integrated in this calculation).

An ESA presentation from 13 June 2006 described a lunar orbital mission of the CSTS spacecraft with three launches, of which two were propulsion modules to propel the spacecraft to a trans-lunar trajectory. Such a scenario, while more complicated than the two-stage approach mentioned by Manuel Valls, would have given more leeway in terms of the CSTS' mass budget.

EADS Astrium Space Transportation concepts for adapting the Ariane 5 ECB for lunar exploration could increase Ariane 5 LEO performance to 27 tonnes. These performance adaptions would have entailed the use of a composite solid rocket casing, and upgrades to the Vulcain Mk III and Vinci (ECSB) engines.

=== Proposed launch sites ===
Both the ESA's site at French Guiana and the planned Russian spaceport at Vostochny were considered as launch sites for the CSTS spacecraft. It had not been decided what launcher would carry the spacecraft to orbit, however Manuel Valls indicated that beside a Russian rocket, Ariane 5 could possibly also function as the carrier rocket.

== Competition within Europe ==
At about the same time as the FKA and the ESA announced their plans for the CSTS spacecraft, the German space agency, DLR, together with EADS Astrium announced their support for the ATV evolution proposal. This proposal envisioned the development of a modified ATV with a reentry capsule that would be return cargo from the ISS by 2013 and in a second phase a crewed vehicle based on this modified ATV by 2017. Those dates were later revised to 2015 and 2020 respectively. This proposal was presented to the ESA's governing body at its meeting in November 2008 and received funding for an initial development phase of a cargo return vehicle that may be ready by 2017. The ATV Evolution concept may have contributed to the end of the CSTS project. However, before the decision to shut down the CSTS project was made, the head of the ESA denied that the proposed evolution version of the ATV was an alternative to the CSTS, and that there were ongoing talks as to whether to continue funding the CSTS project.

== Later developments ==
In 2009, the FKA had decided to keep the general design of the CSTS spacecraft for its new crewed spacecraft, which eventually developed into the Prospective Piloted Transport System (PPTS) project. At the start of the new decade, Russian plans for the development of the PPTS became gradually postponed. The PPTS eventually was developed into the Orel spacecraft.

In January 2013, NASA announced that the ESA would build the service module for the Orion test flight Artemis 1, which was a major step in international cooperation in deep space exploration. Subsequently, the ESA signed an agreement with NASA that saw it shift part of its ATV development focus towards the development of a service module for the Orion spacecraft. This module was derived from the existing service module of the ATV resupply spacecraft.

== See also ==
- Hermes (spacecraft), crewed spaceplane design formerly under development by ESA/CNES. Cancelled in 1994.
- SpaceX Dragon 2, SpaceX's crewed spacecraft for LEO flight contracts, successfully launched to the ISS in 2020
- Boeing CST-100 Starliner, US crewed spacecraft for LEO flight contracts, launched without crew on 2019
- Gaganyaan, Indian crewed spacecraft in development
- Shenzhou spacecraft, Chinese crewed spacecraft
