= Bookmobile =

Vehicle with an onboard library

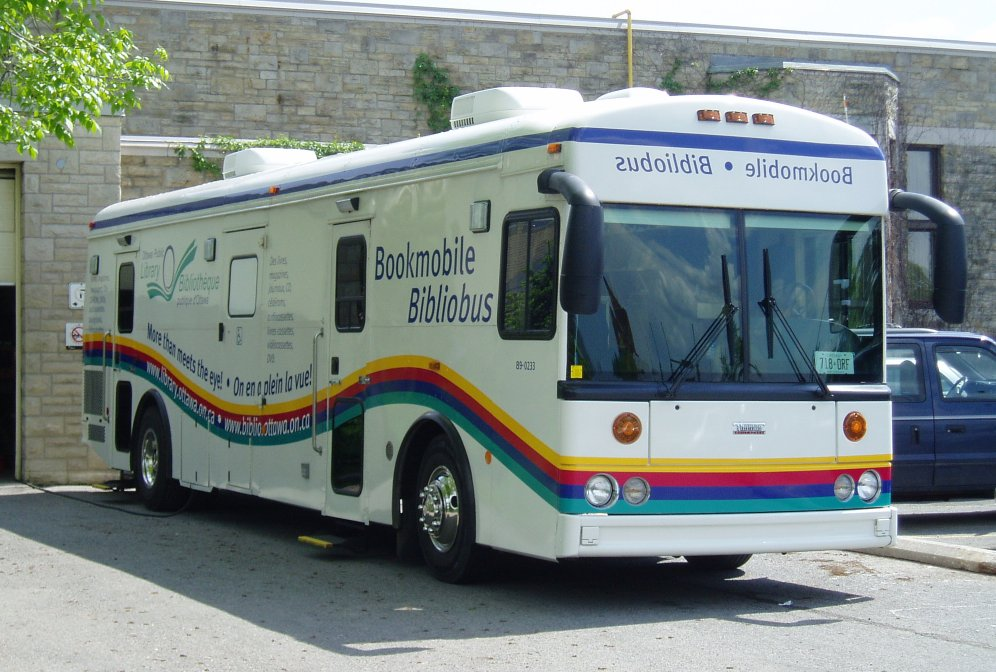
The bookmobile of the Ottawa Public Library. This particular model is based on a Thomas Saf-T-Liner HDX chassis.

A bookmobile, or mobile library, is a vehicle designed for use as a library. They have been known by many names throughout history, including traveling library, library wagon, book wagon, book truck, library-on-wheels, and book auto service. Bookmobiles expand the reach of traditional libraries by transporting books to potential readers, providing library services to people in otherwise underserved locations (such as remote areas) and/or circumstances (such as residents of retirement homes). Bookmobile services and materials (such as Internet access, large print books, and audiobooks), may be customized for the locations and populations served.

Bookmobiles have been based on various means of conveyance, including bicycles, carts, motor vehicles, trains, watercraft, and wagons, as well as camels, donkeys, elephants, horses, and mules.

== History ==
=== 19th century ===
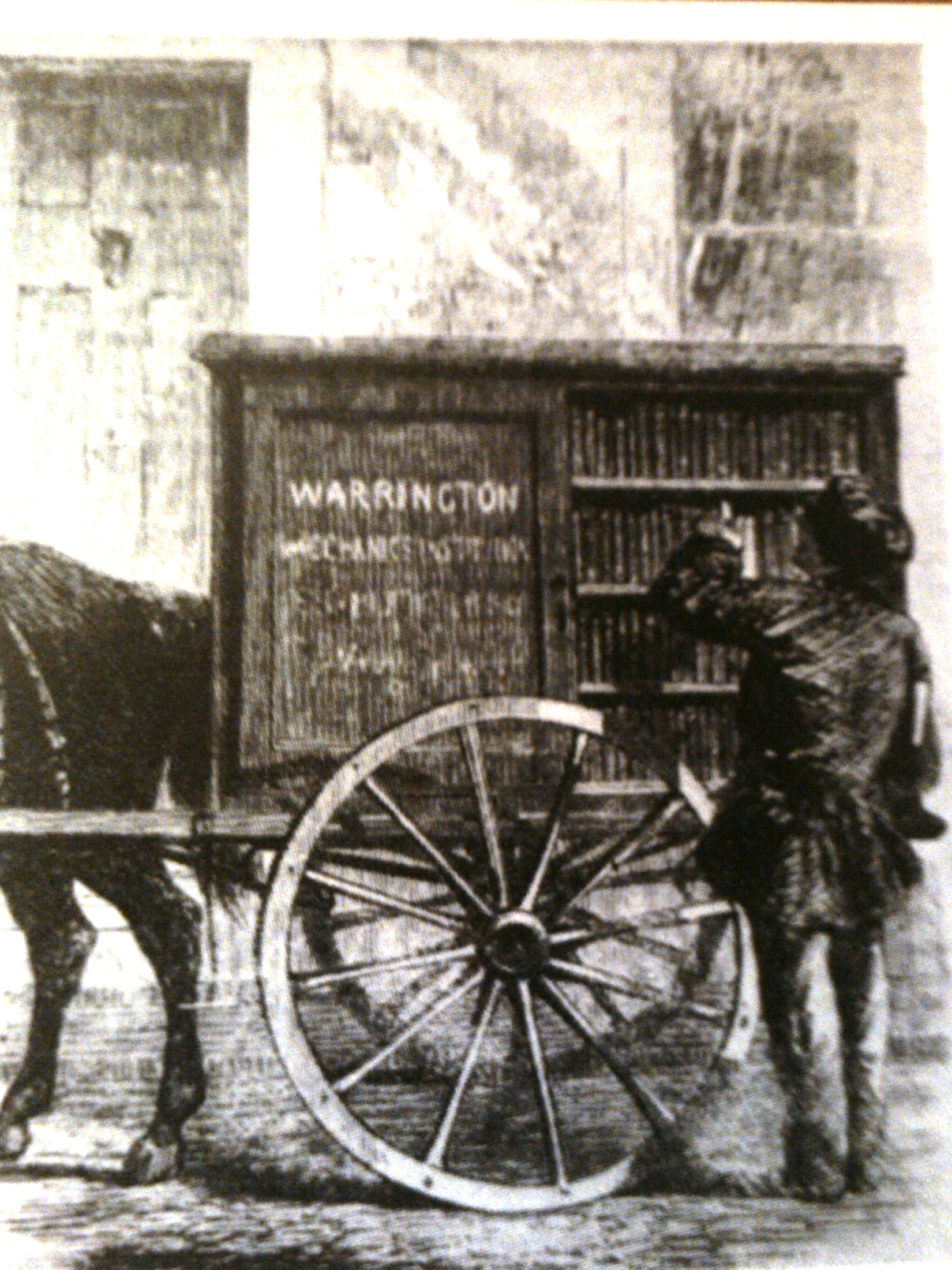
The Perambulating Library of 1859 in Warrington, England

In the United States of America, The American School Library (1839) was a traveling frontier library published by Harper & Brothers. The Smithsonian Institution's National Museum of American History has the only complete original set of this series complete with its wooden carrying case.

The British Workman reported in 1857 about a perambulating library operating in a circle of eight villages, in Cumbria. A Victorian merchant and philanthropist, George Moore, had created the project to "diffuse good literature among the rural population".

The Warrington Perambulating Library, set up in 1858, was another early British mobile library. This horse-drawn van was operated by the Warrington Mechanics' Institute, which aimed to increase the lending of its books to enthusiastic local patrons.

During the late 1800s, women's clubs began advocating for bookmobiles in the state of Texas and throughout the United States. Kate Rotan of the women's club in Waco, Texas, was the first to advocate for bookmobiles. She was president of the Texas Federation of Women's Clubs (TFWC). During this time, women's clubs were encouraged to promote bookmobiles because they embraced their ideas and missions. After receiving so much support and promotion, these traveling libraries increased in numbers all around the United States. In the state of New York from 1895 to 1898 the number of bookmobiles increased to 980. The United States Women Clubs became their primary advocate.

=== 20th century ===
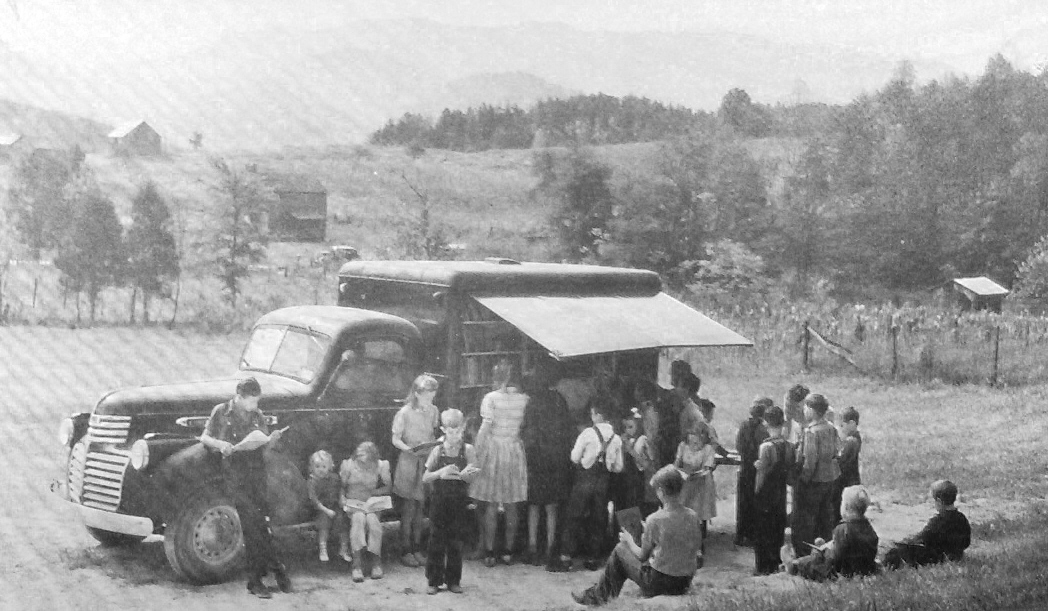
A "book mobile" serving children in Blount County, Tennessee, United States, in 1943

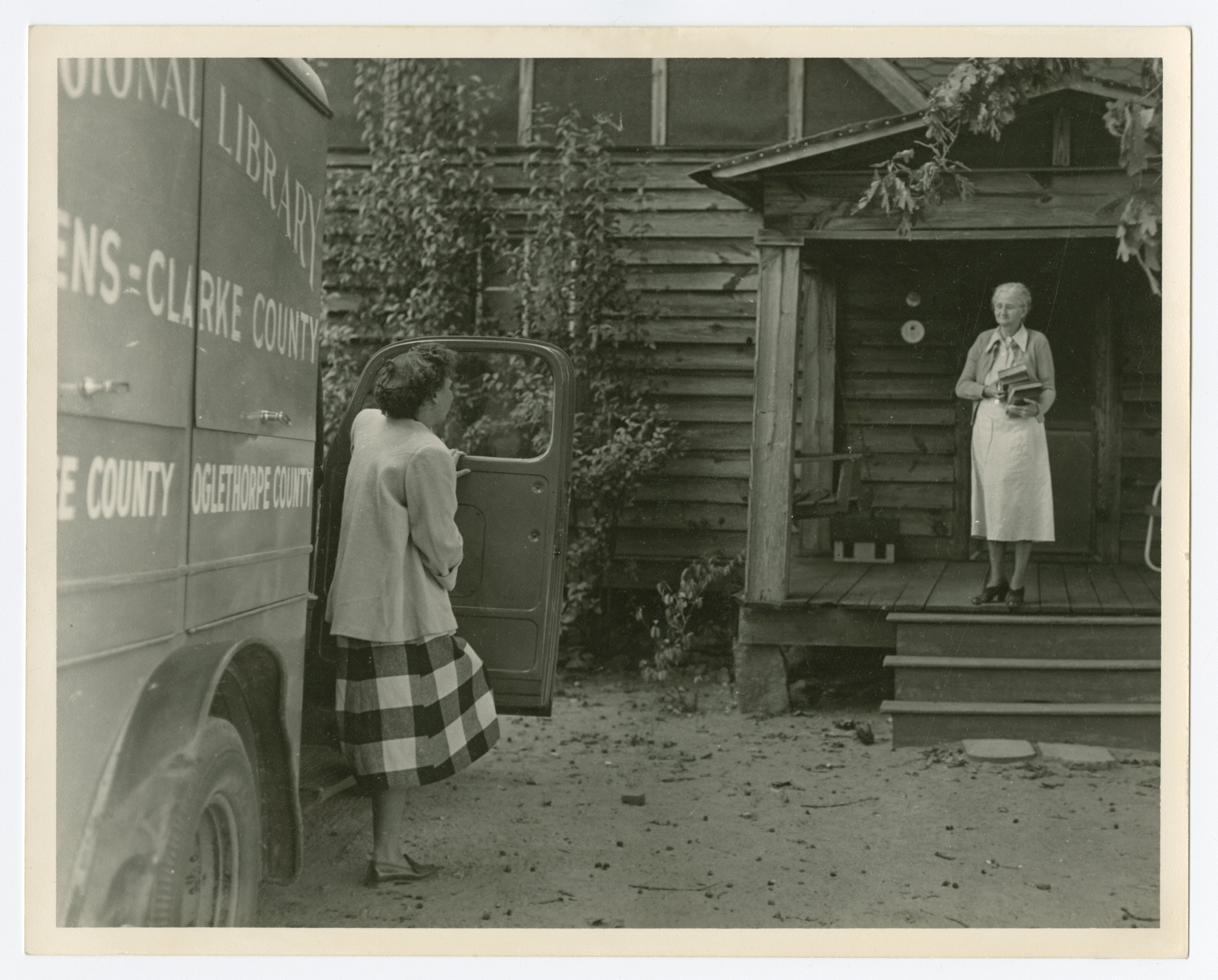
Photograph of Mrs. Asbell, a housewife with an invalid husband, coming out to meet the Athens Regional Library bookmobile in Athens, Georgia, September 1948.

The Women's Club movement in 1904, had the standard to be held accountable for the influx of bookmobiles in thirty out of fifty states. Because of the Texas Federation of Women's Clubs (TFWC), a new legislation to develop public libraries in Texas became possible after much advocating from TFWC for bookmobiles. This new legislation brought in library improvements and expansions that included establishing a system of traveling libraries in Texas. Women's Clubs wanted state governments to step in and create commissions for these traveling libraries. They hoped the commissions would boost the managers of the bookmobile's "Library Sprit". Unfortunately, the Texas Library Association (TLA) could not provide the type of service that is already provided to state libraries to bookmobiles.

1951 video of a "bibliobus" serving small villages in the Netherlands

One of the earliest mobile libraries in the United States was a mule-drawn wagon carrying wooden boxes of books. It was created in 1904 by the People's Free Library of Chester County, South Carolina, and served the rural areas there.

Another early mobile library service was developed by Mary Lemist Titcomb (1857–1932). As a librarian in Washington County, Maryland, Titcomb was concerned that the library was not reaching all the people it could. Meant as a way to reach more library patrons, the annual report for 1902 listed 23 deposit stations, with each being a collection of 50 books in a case that was placed in a store or post office throughout the county. Although popular, Titcomb realized that even this did not reach the most rural residents, and so she cemented the idea of a "book wagon" in 1905, taking the library materials directly to people's homes in remote parts of the county. After securing a Carnegie gift of $2,500, Titcomb purchased a black Concord wagon and employed the library janitor to drive it. The book wagon proved popular, with 1,008 volumes distributed within its first six months.

With the rise of motorized transport in America, a pioneering librarian in 1920 named Sarah Byrd Askew began driving her specially outfitted Model T to provide library books to rural areas in New Jersey. The automobile remained rare, however, and in Minneapolis, the Hennepin County Public Library operated a horse-drawn book wagon starting in 1922.

Following the Great Depression in the United States, a WPA effort from 1935 to 1943 called the Pack Horse Library Project covered the remote coves and mountainsides of Kentucky and nearby Appalachia, bringing books and similar supplies on foot and on hoof to those who could not make the trip to a library on their own. Sometimes these "packhorse librarians" relied on a centralized contact to help them distribute the materials.

At Fairfax County, Virginia, county-wide bookmobile service was begun in 1940, in a truck loaned by the Works Progress Administration (WPA). The WPA support of the bookmobile ended in 1942, but the service continued.

The "Library in Action" was a late-1960s bookmobile program in the Bronx, NY, run by interracial staff that brought books to teenagers of color in under-served neighborhoods.

Bookmobiles reached the height of their popularity in the mid-twentieth century.

In England, bookmobiles, or "traveling libraries" as they were called in that country, were typically used in rural and outlying areas. However, during World War II, one traveling library found popularity in the city of London. Because of air raids and blackouts, patrons did not visit the Metropolitan Borough of Saint Pancras's physical libraries as much as before the war. To meet the needs of its citizens, the borough borrowed a traveling library van from Hastings and in 1941 created a "war-time library on wheels." (The Saint Pancras borough was abolished in 1965 and became part of the London Borough of Camden.)

The Saint Pancras traveling library consisted of a van mounted on a six-wheel chassis powered by a Ford engine. The traveling library could carry more than 2,000 books on open-access shelves that ran the length of the van. The books were arranged in Dewey order, and up to 20 patrons could fit into the van at one time to browse and check out materials. A staff enclosure was at the rear of the van, and the van was lighted with windows in the roof – each fitted with black-out curtains in case of a German bombing raid. The van could even be used at night, as it was fitted with electric roof lamps that could access electrical current from a nearby lamp-standard or civil defense post. The traveling library had a selection of fiction and non-fiction works; it even had a children's section with fairy tales and non-fiction books for kids.

The mayor of the borough christened the van with a speech, saying that "People without books are like houses without windows." Even after heavy night bombings by the Germans, readers visited the Saint Pancras Traveling Library in some of the worst bombed areas.

=== 21st century ===
2016 video of a "bibliobús" serving small towns in Catalonia

Bookmobiles are still in use in the 21st century, operated by libraries, schools, activists, and other organizations. Although some feel that the bookmobile is an outmoded service, citing reasons like high costs, advanced technology, impracticality, and ineffectiveness, others cite the ability of the bookmobile to be more cost-efficient than building more branch libraries would be and its high use among its patrons as support for its continuation. To meet the growing demand for "greener" bookmobiles that deliver outreach services to their patrons, some bookmobile manufacturers have introduced significant advances to reduce their carbon footprint, such as solar/battery solutions in lieu of traditional generators, and all-electric and hybrid-electric chassis. Bookmobiles have also taken on an updated form in the form of m libraries, also known as mobile libraries in which patrons are delivered content electronically.

The Internet Archive runs its own bookmobile to print out-of-copyright books on demand. The project has spun off similar efforts elsewhere in the developing world.

The Free Black Women's Library is a mobile library in Brooklyn. Founded by Ola Ronke Akinmowo in 2015, this bookmobile features books written by black women. Titles are available in exchange for other titles written by black female authors.

== National Bookmobile Day ==
In the U.S., the American Library Association sponsors National Bookmobile Day in April each year, on the Wednesday of National Library Week. They celebrate the nation's bookmobiles and the dedicated library professionals who provide this service to their communities.

In February 2021, the American Library Association (ALA), the Association of Bookmobile and Outreach Services (ABOS), and the Association for Rural and Small Libraries (ARSL) agreed to rebrand National Bookmobile Day in recognition of all that outreach library professional do within their communities. Instead, libraries across the country will observe National Library Outreach Day on April 7, 2021. Formerly known as National Bookmobile Day, communities will celebrate the invaluable role library professionals and libraries continuously play in bringing library services to those in need.

== Countries ==
=== Africa ===
- In Kenya, the Camel Mobile Library Service is funded by the National Library Service of Kenya and by Book Aid International and it operates in Garissa and Wajir, near the border with Somalia. The service started with three camels in October 1996 and had 12 in 2006, delivering more than 7,000 books —in English, Somali, and Swahili. Masha Hamilton used this service as a background for her 2007 novel The Camel Bookmobile.
- "Donkey Drawn Electro-Communication Library Carts" were being employed in Zimbabwe in 2002 as "a centre for electric and electronic communication: radio, telephone, fax, e-mail, Internet".
- In Nigeria, Funmi Ilori, a former schoolteacher, founded iRead Mobile Library after receiving a grant from the federal government of Nigeria in 2013. The “books on wheels” initiative was realized to promote a sustainable reading culture in children that builds positive reading habits over time and leads to improved growth and development. The four iRead Mobile Library buses and their team bring a selection of over 13,000 books and service around 3,000 children with 44 stops per week at schools and community centers and a monthly stop to rural areas outside of Lagos state.

=== Asia ===
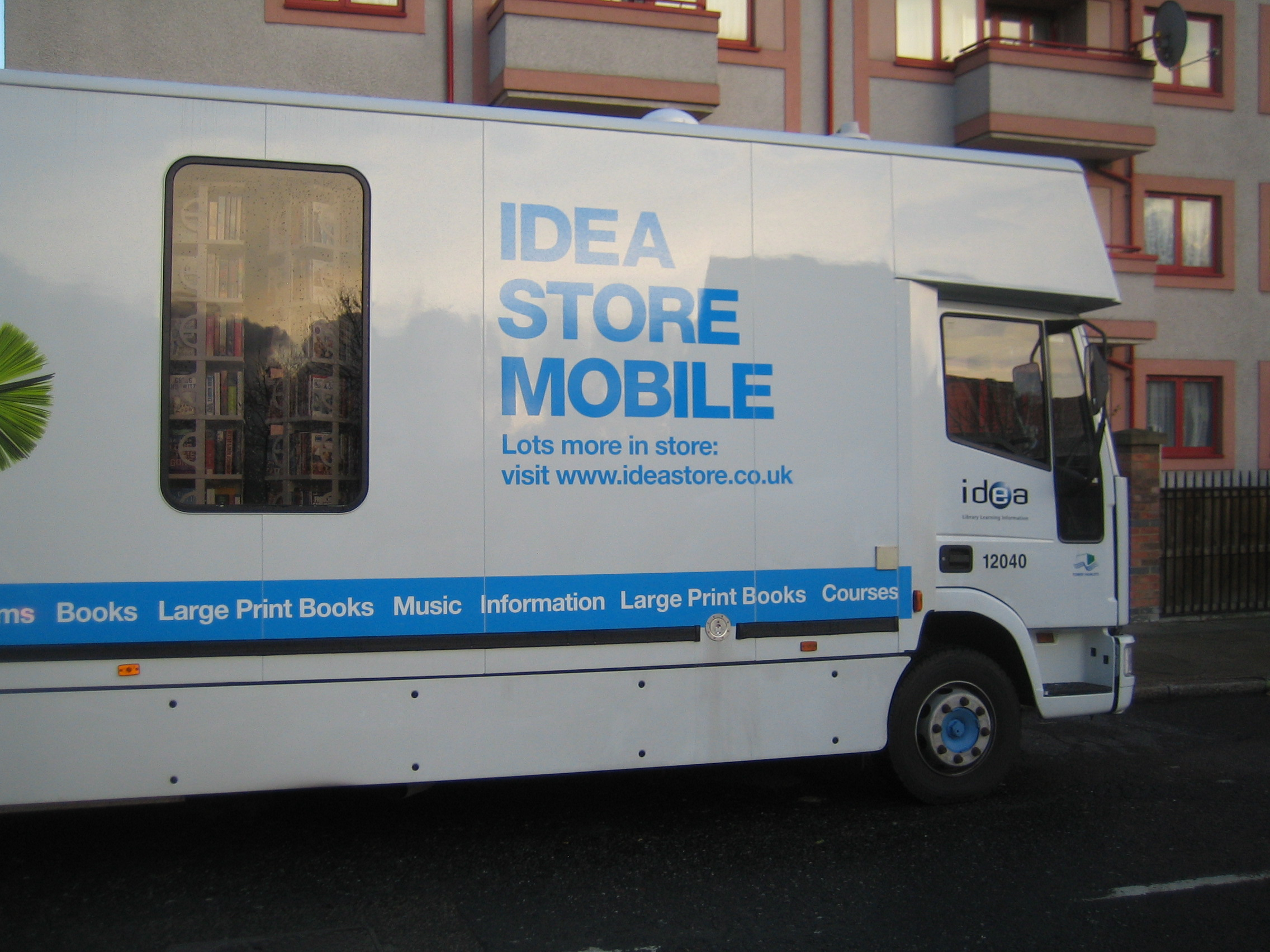
Mobile Idea Store, London, 2008

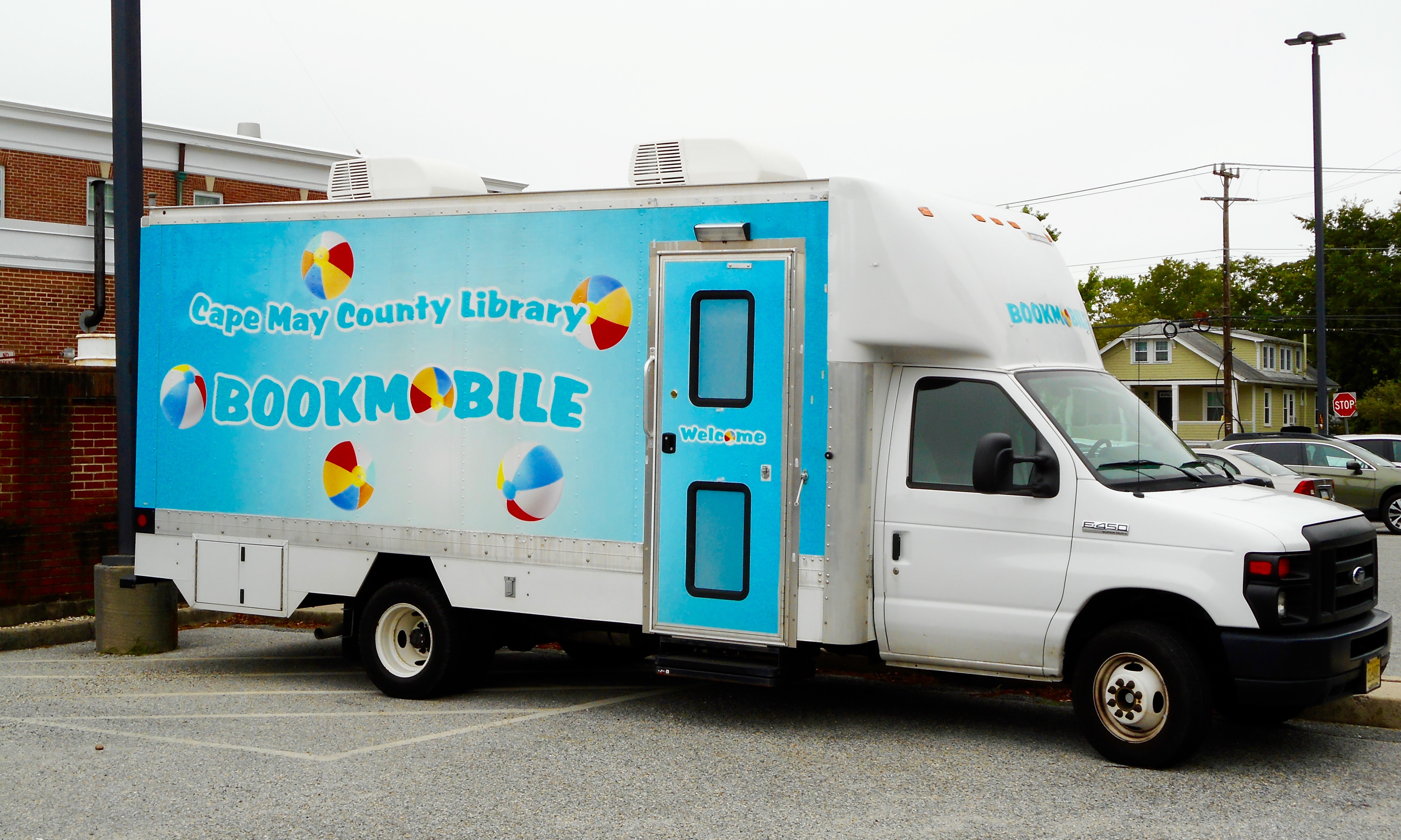
Cape May County Library bookmobile in Cape May Court House, New Jersey

- In Bangladesh Bishwo Shahitto Kendro pioneered the concept of mobile library. Mobile library was introduced in Bangladesh in 1999. Then the service was limited to Dhaka, Chattogram, Khulna and Rajshahi only. Now the service is available in 58 districts of the country. There are about 330,000 registered users of this library. These mobile libraries together gives the service of 1900 small libraries in 1900 localities of the country.
- In Brunei, mobile libraries are known as Perpustakaan Bergerak. They are operated by Language and Literature Bureau, the government body which manages public libraries in the country. The service was introduced in 1970.
- In Indonesia in 2015, Ridwan Sururi and his horse "Luna" started a mobile library called Kudapustaka (meaning "horse library" in Indonesian). The goal is to improve access to books for villagers in a region that has more than 977,000 illiterate adults. The duo travel between villages in central Java with books balanced on Luna's back. Sururi also visits schools three times a week.
- In Thailand in 2002, mobile libraries were taking several unique forms.
- Elephant Libraries were bringing books as well as information technology equipment and services to 46 remote villages in the hills of Northern Thailand. This project was awarded the UNESCO International Literacy Prize for 2002.
- A Floating Library had two book boats, one of which was outfitted with computers.
- A three-car "Library Train for Homeless Children" (parked in a siding near the railway police compound) was a "joint project with the railway police in an initiative to keep homeless children from crime and exploitation by channeling them to more constructive activities". The train was being replicated in "a slum community in Bangkok", where it, too, would include a library car, a classroom car, and a computer and music car.
- Book Houses were shipping containers fitted out as libraries with books. The 10 original Book Houses were so popular, another 20 units were already being planned.
- In India, the Boat Library Services were operated under the auspices of the Andhra Pradesh Library Association, Vijayawada, Andhra Pradesh State. Paturi Nagabhushanam initiated boat libraries to inculcate interest in reading of books and libraries among the rural public in 1935 October, as an extended activity of Andhra Pradesh Library Movement. He had run this service for about seven years to benefit the villagers travelling on boats, which was a major travel and transportation facility available in those days. These libraries facilitated Telugu literary journals and books.,
- In northern Syria in 2017, the Mobile Library, run by a team from the Syrian NGO Dari Sustainable Development, created the project to encourage education through reading and provide escapism to children throughout the war-torn region. The Mobile Library contains around 2,000 books and reaches thousands of children per year with a dedicated seven-person team. Shihadeh, a member of the Dari project team says, “ the Mobile Library also aims to empower society and the vulnerable people by encouraging reading and building confidence in these children.”
- In Ankara, Turkey, sanitation workers came together to salvage books thrown in the trash to create a public library. The library is located in an abandoned underground factory and contains a collection of over 6,000 books. The library offers a mobile option out of a repurposed garbage truck, which provides books to underprivileged schools and doubles as a book donation collection vehicle.

=== Australia ===
- The First bookmobile in the State of Victoria was operated by Heidelberg Library (now Yarra Plenty Regional Library) in the City of Heidelberg, Melbourne in 1954.

=== Europe ===
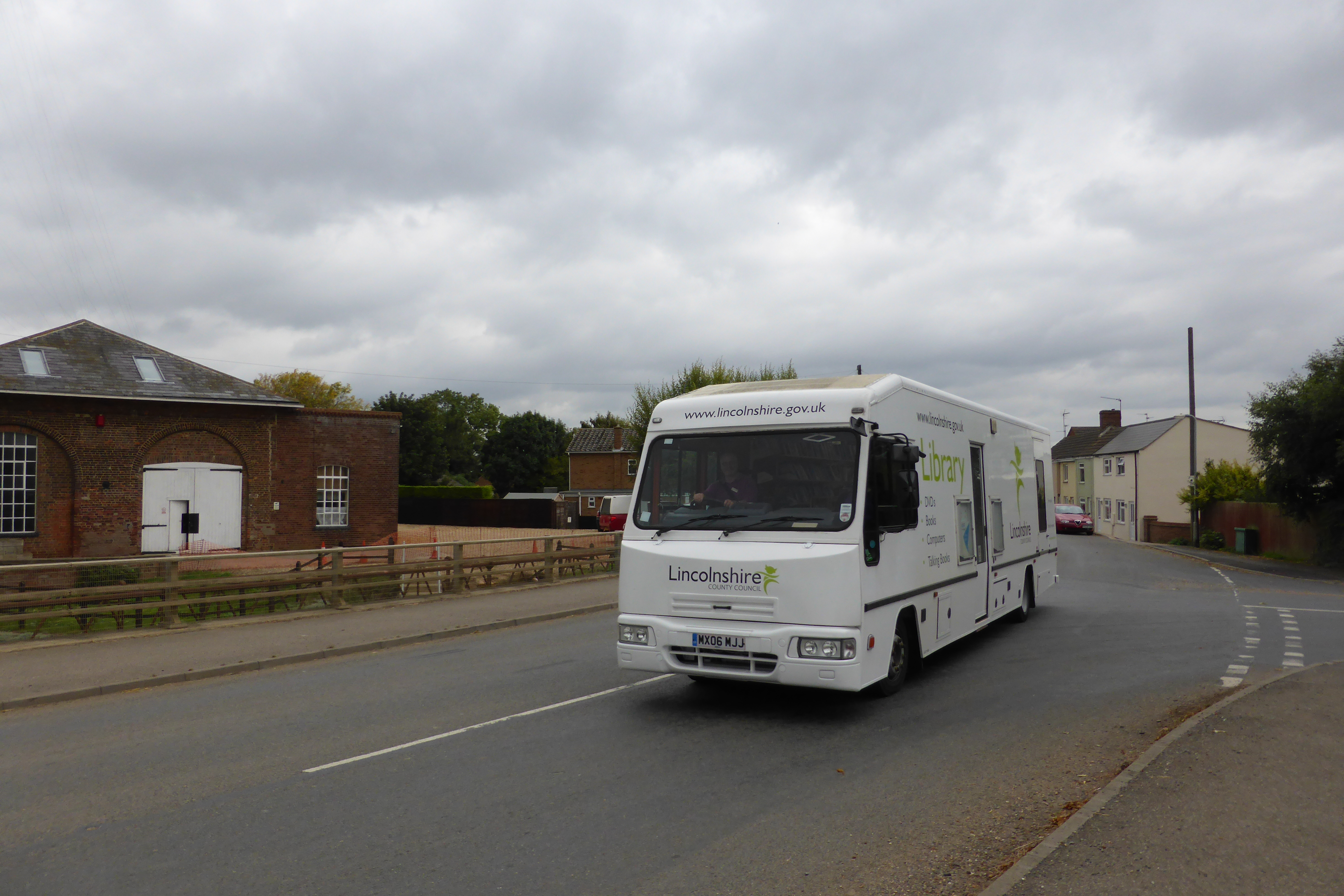
Lincolnshire mobile library covering small villages in this English county

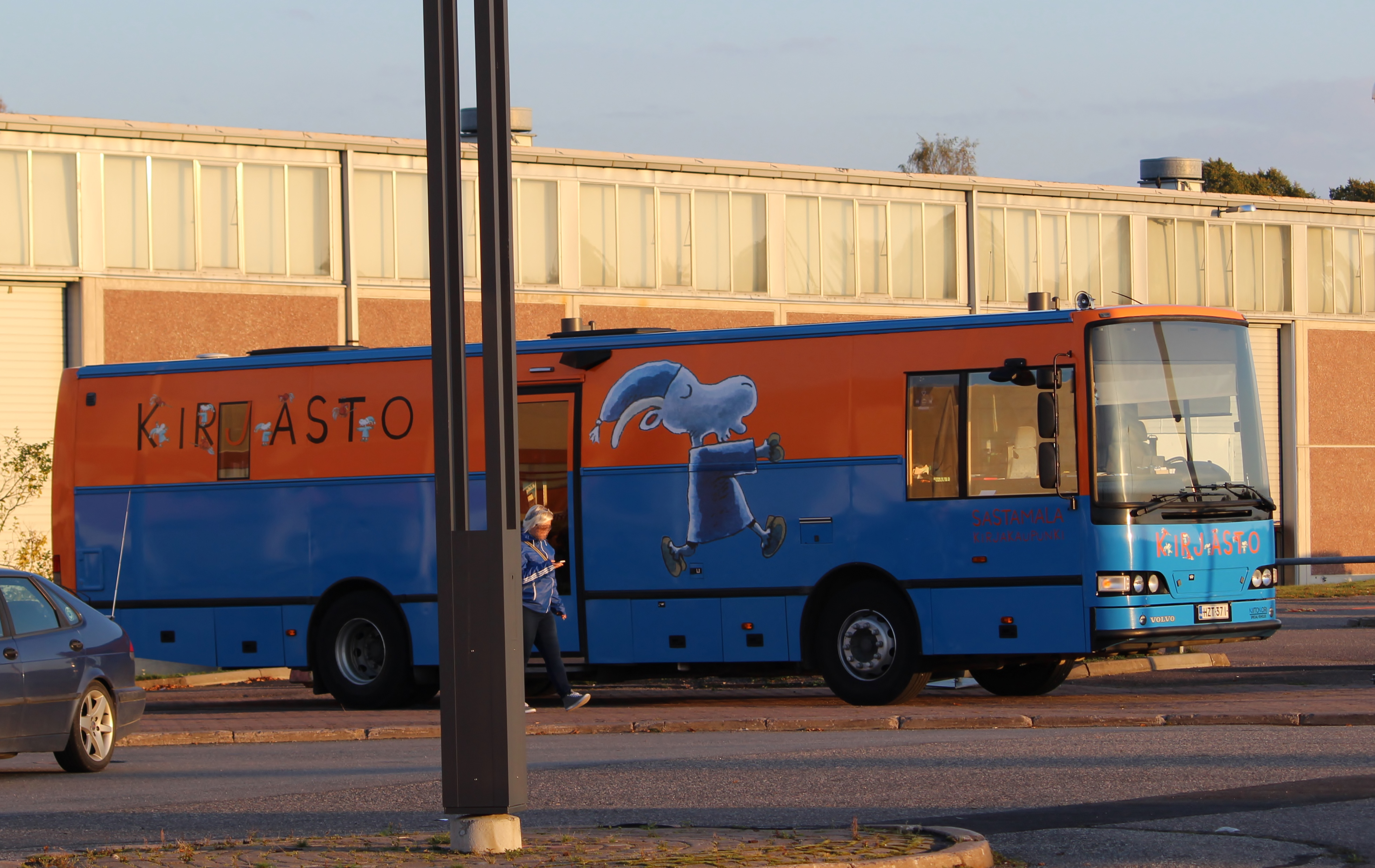
Sastamala town's bookmobile at the 2014 book fair in Turku, Finland

- In Glasgow, Scotland, in 2002, MobileMeet—a gathering of about 50 mobile libraries that was held annually by the IFLA—there were "mobiles from Sweden, Holland, Ireland, England, and of course Scotland. There were big vans from Edinburgh and small vans from the Highlands. Many of the vans were proudly carrying awards from previous meets."
- Since 1953, the Libraries of the Community of Madrid, Spain, have operated a bibliobus program with books, DVDs, CDs, and other library materials available for checkout.
- A floating library, aboard the ship Epos, was begun in 1959 and serves the many small communities on the coast of Western Norway.
- In Estonia, the bookmobile "Katarina Jee" has been running since 2008, serving patrons in suburbs of Tallinn.
- In Finland, the first mobile library was established in Vantaa in 1913. There are currently about 200 bookmobiles in Finland, operating across the country.
- In Italy, Antonio La Cava, a retired teacher of 42 years, drives one of the smallest mobile libraries in the world. The Bibliomotocarro was created by La Cava from a converted 3-wheeler van and his desire to do more to help children discover books and the power of the written word. La Cava has traveled with his mini library of over 700 books into the hills and mountains of remote communities for over 20 years to promote literacy, encourage writing, and bring books into the hands of children that need them most.
- In Amsterdam, Netherlands, a mobile library called BeibBus, was created in 2010 to deliver books and reading engagement to children without access to a library. The Zaan region, just outside the city, consists of many smaller villages with very narrow streets and limited parking space. The BeibBus was designed by Jord den Hollander to solve this issue with a slimmer design and expansion capabilities. The Biebus is a truck-container travelling to 20 primary schools equipped with over 7,000 books and can accommodate 30-45 children. The unique trailer system offers a more traditional library space containing shelves of books with a transparent ceiling and a second space with a spaceship design to provide an enticing reading room experience.

=== North America ===
Bookmobile in Perry County, Kentucky

- Street Books is a nonprofit book service founded in 2011 in Portland, Oregon, that travels via bicycle-powered cart to lend books to "people living outside".
- Books on Bikes is a program begun in 2013 by the Seattle Public Library that uses a customized bicycle trailer pulled by pedal power to bring library services to community events in Seattle.
- The Library Cruiser is a "book bike" from the Volusia County Libraries that debuted in Florida in September 2015. Library staff ride it to various locations, offering library books for checkout, as well as WiFi service, ebook access help, and information on obtaining a library card.
- Bookleggers Library is nonprofit mobile library program in Miami, Florida founded in 2012 that expands access to free books. The founding director, Nathaniel Sandler, and his library team have a mission to spread books across the city and encourage literacy. One way Bootleggers accomplishes this goal is through what Sandler refers to as “bookmobility.” In 2024, the library team created a book trailer they can utilize to haul books anywhere in the city. In addition, Bootleggers first launched a multimedia Bookbike in 2021 outfitted with a unique shelving system, speakers, and Wi-Fi capabilities to offer even more access to free books.
- The Queens Mobile Library in New York partners with social services agencies like Homes for the Homeless to offer outreach and support to underserved residents in the boroughs. The bus-sized bookmobile services immigrant families and the homeless by providing 2,000 books, free Wi-Fi, videos, and alternative language resources when needed. The Queens Mobile Library does tours to bring materials to senior care homes, parks, churches, resource centers, and community events. The Queens Library also has a Bookcycle program, launched in 2018, to bring books and library resources to people in less accessible areas.

=== South America ===
- The Biblioburro is a mobile library by which Colombian teacher Luis Soriano and his two donkeys, Alfa and Beto, bring books to children in rural villages twice a week. CNN chose Soriano as one of their 2010 Heroes of the Year.
- In Buenos Aires, Argentina, Raul Lemesoff transformed a 1979 Ford Falcon into a bookmobile to look like a military tank. The book tank is equipped with a swiveling turret, a non-functioning gun, and built-in shelves to hold over 900 books. Lemesoff created the travelling library in 2015 on World Book Day to spread the printed word with free books all around urban and rural areas of Argentina. Lemesoff’s motto is “Peace through literature.” He labeled the mobile tank his “weapon of mass instruction.”

== See also ==
- Digital library
- Traveling library
- Boat Libraries
