= Boat Libraries =

The Boat Libraries were operated under the auspices of the Andhra Pradesh Library Association, Vijayawada. They are mobile libraries or bookmobiles as per the functionality, but boats were used as a conveyance for transporting books to the boat travellers/users.

== Initiation ==
Paturi Nagabhushanam initiated boat libraries to inculcate reading interest, books, and libraries among the public. He started the Boat Library service in 1935 in addition to the other regular activities of the Andhra Pradesh Library Movement and conducted this service for about seven years for the Padapalem "Sevasrama Vani Mandir". In those days, all people of the Guntur district villages in Andhra Pradesh were relying on 'Boats' to travel and transport goods. Villagers were idling their boat travel time in chit-chatting. With the introduction of boat library services, people were availing the facility reading books, magazines, and learning about them.

== Opening ceremony ==
The first boat library service launched on 1935 October 25 between the "Pedavadlapudi - Kollur" on the Krishna Bank canal with the patronage of the "Aryabala Society (Samajam)" and the "Sevashrama Vani Mandir". The opening ceremony was organised by Paturi Nagabhushanam at a grand scale at "Sevashrama Vani Mandir" in the presence of villagers, village heads, Mandal presidents and service members of "Seva Ashram". The event was formally inaugurated by 'Saranu Ramaswamy Chowdhary', the then President of the Guntur Mandala Library on 1935 October 25. The inauguration was ceremoniously organised on 28 October by the "Aryabala community" at their premises, from where the boat library boxes were picked up in big procession. The ceremony was attended by village dignitaries, senior citizens, and people from neighbouring villages. After conducting a meeting at the canal premises and lectures of dignitaries, book containers (boxes) were arranged on the boat. On this occasion "Vasireddi Annapurnamma of Chinapalem" has gifted a box for keeping books on the boat.

== Services ==
The boat library was run on the Krishna Bank Canal from "Pedavadlapudi to Kollur", pausing at docks on the way facilitating readers with books. As the boat library services became popular among the public, Paturi Nagabhushanam opened a second boat library in another twenty days, on 1935 November 17 to run between the villages of "Pedavadlapudi - Pidaparru". These libraries included literary journals such as "Bharathi", "Krishna Patrika", "Grandhalaya Sarvaswam", "Arogya Patrika", "Prakruti" and books. Some publishers, magazines and other contributors were donating books to these libraries. The services were temporarily suspended during the summer since there was less water in these canals. By the beginning of the second year boat library services, some more boat libraries were opened elsewhere. "Sarvajani Vidyapradayani Library" also started boat libraries for boat passengers in Sangam Jagaralamudi, Tenali Taluk.

== Recognition ==
The services of this boat library have garnered the attention of public representatives, celebrities, philanthropists and library personalities. Newspapers such as "The Hindu" and "Andhra Patrika" have published and propagated these services. S.R.Ranganathan, the Secretary of Madras Library Association, who read the news in "The Hindu" daily, found out the details of the Boat Libraries and published them in their annual report. The Adult Education Society of London also collected the details of boat libraries.

== See also ==
- Mobile Libraries
- Bookmobile
