= OlaRonke Akinmowo =

OlaRonke Akinmowo (also styled Olaronke Akinmowo) is an American interdisciplinary artist, community organizer, and librarian best known as the founder and director of The Free Black Women's Library, a social art project in Bedford-Stuyvesant, Brooklyn. Her artistic practice encompasses collage, papermaking, printmaking, book arts, and stop-motion animation, and she also works as a set decorator for film and television.

== Early life and education ==
Akinmowo was born and raised in Brooklyn, New York. She has described reading and libraries as formative to her childhood, providing escape and inspiration that shaped her later work.

She holds a Master of Arts degree in Interdisciplinary Arts from Goddard College. Her academic work focuses on Black Feminist and Womanist scholarship, exploring the intersections of race, culture, spirituality, and gender.

== The Free Black Women's Library ==
In 2015, Akinmowo founded The Free Black Women's Library, a mobile library and social art project dedicated exclusively to literature written by Black women and Black nonbinary authors. The project began when Akinmowo reached out to friends and family via social media, asking them to identify essential books by Black women. She received approximately 100 books and set up the first iteration of the library on a brownstone stoop in Brooklyn. The library initially operated as a trading system, where visitors could exchange books written by Black women.

The library traveled to various cities including Chicago, Philadelphia, Baltimore, and Detroit, appearing at parks, street corners, community centers, and cultural events such as the New York Art Book Fair. Akinmowo initially transported the collection using a bike trailer, later transitioning to vehicle transport as the collection expanded.

In August 2022, The Free Black Women's Library opened a permanent storefront at 226 Marcus Garvey Boulevard in Bedford-Stuyvesant, Brooklyn. The space functions as a reading room, co-working space, community gathering center, and cultural institution. The permanent location features over 5,000 books, a backyard garden, a free store, a period pantry, a virtual reading club, and weekly book swaps.

=== Sister Outsider relief grant ===
In April 2020, during the COVID-19 pandemic, Akinmowo launched the Sister Outsider Relief Grant, a mutual aid program for single Black mothers who are artists, writers, cultural workers, and community organizers. Initially funded with $1,250 from Akinmowo's own earnings as a set decorator, the program quickly attracted community donations. By 2021, the grant had distributed over $40,000 to more than 132 people.

== Artistic Practice ==
Akinmowo's artistic work centers on celebrating the expansive nature of Blackness and Black womanhood. She works primarily in collage, handmade paper sculptures, monotype prints, stop-motion projections, and interactive installations.

In 2017, her work was included in "The Archive of Affect," a group exhibition at NURTUREart in Brooklyn that examined approaches to archiving histories. In October 2018, following her residency at the Robert Blackburn Printmaking Workshop, she presented her first solo exhibition at the Offit Gallery in New York. In early 2019, The Free Black Women's Library was featured as part of "CURRICULUM: spaces of learning and unlearning," a group exhibition at EFA Project Space that explored collective study and political action. The exhibition ran from January 16 through March 16, 2019, and Akinmowo participated in a panel discussion on collective strategies for reparative care.

In 2021, Akinmowo served as a teaching artist in creative writing for the Museum of Contemporary African Diasporan Arts "I AM" exhibition, working with students from PS 375 and PS 316 on Afrofuturism-themed projects.
