= Grandhalaya Sarvaswam =

Telugu Scientific Journal

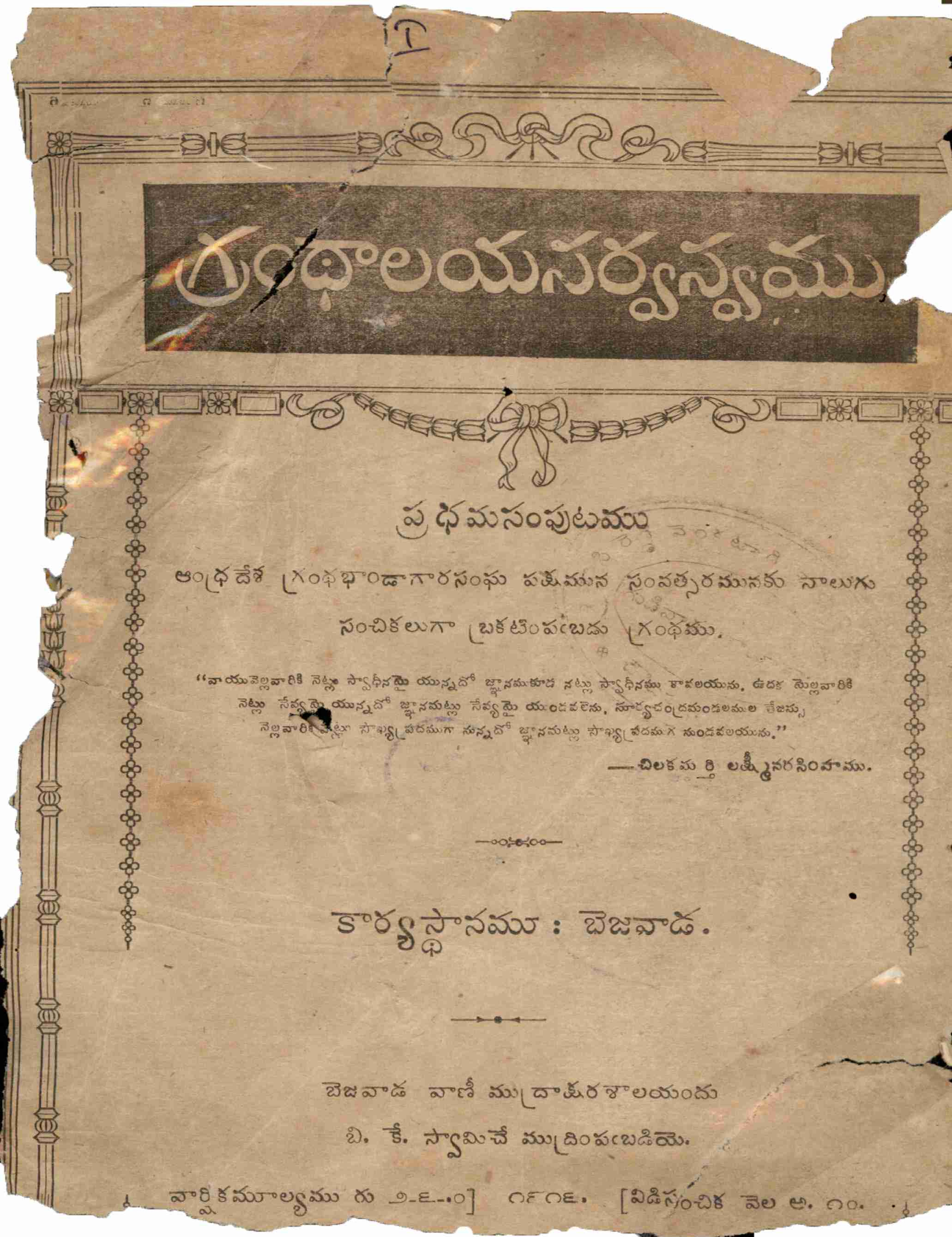
- Cover page of Grandaalaya Sarvasvamu V.1 No.1 from 1916
- Categories: Library science
- Founder: Iyyanki Venkata Ramanayya
- Founded: 1915
- First issue: 1916
- Country: India
- Based in: Vijayawada
- Language: Telugu

Grandhalaya Sarvaswam (Telugu: గ్రాంథాలయ సర్వస్వము IAST: Grānthālaya Sarvasvamu) is a Telugu periodical related to the library science and Library and information science. The Andhra Pradesh Library Association in India has been publishing this periodical since the year 1915 for the development of the library movement. It is the oldest regional language periodical in the country.

Granthalaya Saraswam is the second oldest LIS journal. It was started in 1915 and published by the Andhra Desa Library Association in Telugu edited by Iyyanki Venkata Ramanayya. The first LIS journal Library Miscellany was published in the year 1912 in India by State Library Department, Baroda in English, Gujarati and Marathi, with Shri J. S. Kodalkar as its first editor but later the publication was ceased in the year 1920.

The earliest volumes of the periodical were covering the news and articles related to libraries, news regarding children's force, literary discussions, modern poems, songs rendered in connection with library movement, featured articles related to the history and science. Gradually, libraries, book reviews were included, along with the contents of the Gandhiji's constructive program. It began publishing orders issued by the Andhra Pradesh public library directorate for the benefit of employees working in district libraries.

== Publication history ==
Prior to the publication of Grandhalaya Sarvaswam, the library community and those who worked for library-related issues had to rely on other journals to publish their articles, news and opinions. So the Andhra Desa Library Association launched its own magazine as quarterly in 1915, which was published as a bimonthly journal two years later. The Association began publishing the periodical as a monthly magazine after Volume 6. The same periodical was stopped for a while in mid-1921 and started again in July 1928 as a monthly. This library periodical though was stopped between the years 1930–33, before being restored in 1934, completing 11 volumes. Although the publication encountered some fluctuations, the Grandhalaya Sarvaswam was reintroduced due to the pioneering efforts of the father of the library movement, Ayyanki Venkata Ramanaiah, from January 1948 and is still being published uninterruptedly.

Between September 1939 and October 1941, the magazine was published quarterly under the name Andhra Granthalayam in both Telugu (the language of Andhra Pradesh) and English. Its publication in English has spread to other states and continents. Publication stalled in the wake of the dearth of paper in World War II. So, the Association has published the editions of the 23,24 Andhra Pradesh Grandhalaya Conferences held in Pedapalem of Tenali Taluka and Hindupur in Anantapur District, respectively, in the place of Grandhalaya Sarvaswam. Since the situation was improved, this library periodical publication was restored under the same name, has been publishing still now on a regular basis.

== Editors ==
Ayyanki Venkata Ramanaiah, Paturi Nagabhushanam and Gadde Ramamurthy served as the first three editors of the publication. Raavi Sarada, who is the daughter of Paturi Nagabhushanam, is the current editor, printer, and publisher of the Sarwasavam periodical, and has been since the year 1989. Details are given below.

Editor	Volumes	Years
Ayyanki Venkata Ramanaiah	1-11	1915–1938
Paturi Nagabhushanam	12-48	1948–1987
Gadde Ramamurthy	48-49	1987–1988
Raavi Sarada	49 -	1989 -

== Special issues ==
The journal occasionally publishes special issues for special occasions, devoted to the literature pertaining to a specific subject or event. The December issue of every year, devoted to the news, items related to the "National Library Week", celebrations in various public and other libraries in Andhra Pradesh and Telangana.

The Andhra Pradesh Library Association, which publishes the magazine, set up their own building in Vijayawada in 1939 and named it after Gadicherla Harisarvottama Rao. The association has been preserving all volumes of the periodical in this building which was instrumental in promoting the library movement in Andhra Pradesh.
