= G. V. R. Rao =

G.V.R.Rao (Gadicharla V R Rao)
- Born: 24 June 1918; Rajahmundry, Andhra Pradesh, India
- Died: 27 May 2005 (aged 86); Thousand Oaks, California, USA
- Known for: Bell nozzle, also commonly called the Rao Nozzle

Gadicharla V.R. Rao (G. V. R. Rao), D.Sc. (June 24, 1918- May 27, 2005) was an Indian aerospace engineer who worked in the jet engine and rocket propulsion fields. Rao worked for General Electric in their Gas Turbine Division department and was a research scientist at Marquardt Aircraft, before working for Rocketdyne, where he designed the optimum thrust nozzle. Often referred to as the "Rao's nozzle", it is part of the standard design for rocket engines. The Rao Nozzle is used currently in rocket, missile, and satellite control systems worldwide. It is taught in universities that offer Aerospace Engineering, including Massachusetts Institute of Technology (MIT), California Institute of Technology (Caltech), and Georgia Institute of Technology.

During his career, he also worked on aerodynamic and fluid dynamic design projects, such as chemical lasers, the space shuttle main engines scramjet and aerospike rocket engines, and wind-powered generators.

== Personal life and education ==
On June 24, 1918, Rao was born in Rajahmundry in the Andhra Pradesh province of southeastern India. His father was a school headmaster. Rao was born into a large Brahmin household, and is related to Gadicherla Harisarvottama Rao, a well-known freedom fighter for India's independence.

Rao attended Madras Engineering College, and then came to the United States, where he received his D.Sc. in Aeronautical Engineering from New York University in 1949.

He met and married Mary Fabrizio in New York, and they subsequently moved to Bangalore, India. Rao and Mary returned to America after their first son, Raman was born. Rao then worked at General Electric. Their second son, Krishna was born, and the family subsequently moved to Woodland Hills, California. In 1976, the Raos moved to Thousand Oaks. Rao died at the age of 86 on May 27, 2005.

== Career ==
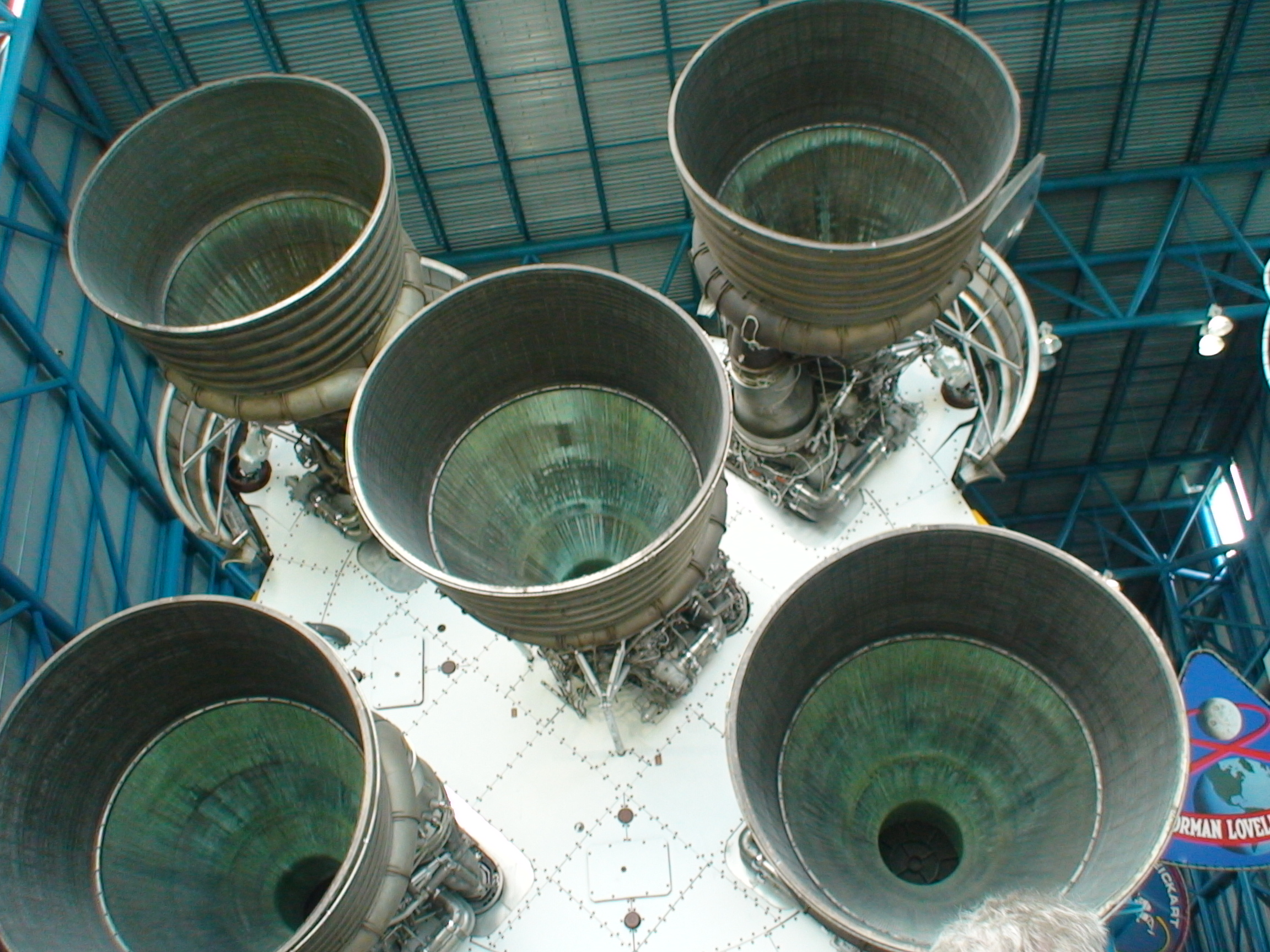
Nozzles of Saturn-V

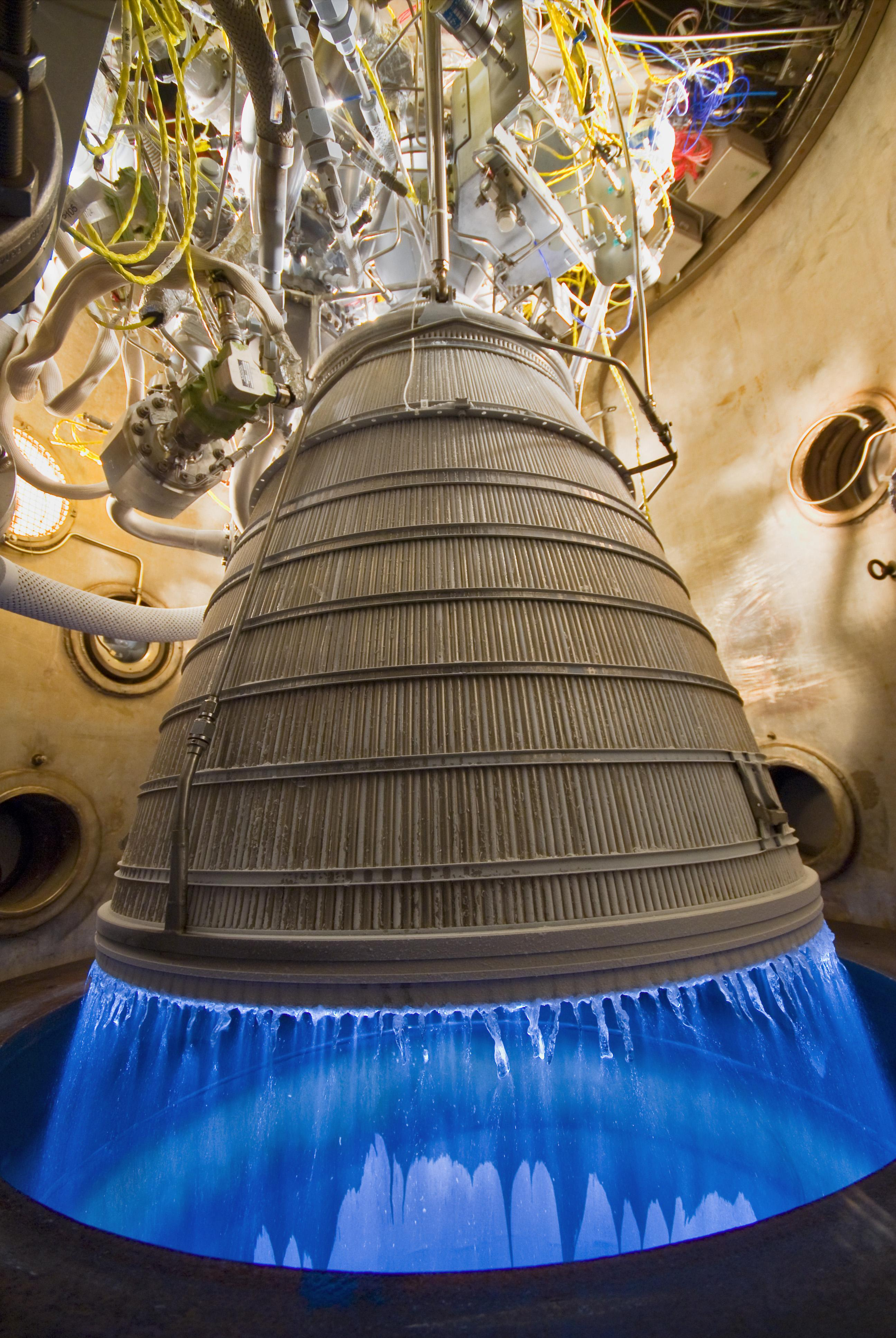
Nozzle of an extensible Cryogenic Engine

=== Educator ===
After receiving his D.Sc., Rao taught in Bangalore, India at the Graduate Research Institute.

=== Aerospace engineer ===
From 1952 to 1955, Rao worked for General Electric in their Gas Turbine Division. He was then a research scientist at Marquardt Aircraft until 1958. Rao then worked for Rocketdyne in California as a design analyst.

Beginning in the mid-1950s, Rao began to use mainframe computers at Rocketdyne to make computations for the design of rocket nozzles. Kramer and Wheelock state, "Rao developed a method for determining the nozzle contour that would produce the maximum thrust for any given nozzle area ratio and length... The optimum turned out to be not only more efficient but also considerably shorter by about 60% than a 15-degree conical nozzle of the same area." George P. Sutton, who worked with Rao at Rocketdyne, said that "bell shape or curved exit contour is used almost universally today for nozzles designed since about 1960 for large as well as small thrust chamber nozzles" and for both solid and liquid propellants. In 1963, the Advanced Propulsion Section of NASA published Computation of Plug Nozzle Contours by the Rao Optimum Thrust Method about a study that was performed to design a plug nozzle using Rao's maximum thrust theory using a FORTRAN computer program. In 1983, Rao's design was modified, with a slightly different contour, to maximize performance.

In 1961, Rao worked at National Engineering Science Company as associate director. By 1970, he formed his own company, G. V. R. Rao and Associates, through which he contracted with NASA. He worked at Rockwell International for Marshall Space Flight Center in 1988. During his career, he also worked on aerodynamic and fluid dynamic design projects, such as chemical lasers, the space shuttle main engines scramjet and aerospike rocket engines, and wind-powered generators.

His patented inventions include Device for thrust spoiling and thrust reversal (1957), Quiet fan with non-radial elements (1975), Shock wave suppressing flow plate for pulsed lasers (1984), and Mixing aids for supersonic flows (1990).

== Publications ==
- Rao, G. V. R. (June 1958). "Exhaust Nozzle Contour for Optimum Thrust". Journal of Jet Propulsion. 28 (6): 377–382. doi:10.2514/8.7324.
- Rao, G. V. R. (August 1958), Contoured Rocket Nozzles. Paper presented at Ninth Annual Cong. Int. Astronautical Federation (Amsterdam)
- Rao, G. V. R. (May 1960). "Analysis of a New Concept Rocket Nozzle". Liquid Rockets and Propellants. American Institute of Aeronautics and Astronautics. pp. 669–682. doi:10.2514/5.9781600864759.0669.0682. ISBN 978-1-56347-851-2.
- Rao, G. V. R. (June 1960). "Approximation of Optimum Thrust Nozzle Contour". ARS Journal. 30 (6): 561.
- Rao, G. V. R. (1961). "Nozzle Contours". Handbook of Astronautical Engineering. New York: McGraw-Hill. "Chapter 20.33"
- Rao, G. V. R. (1971). Study of Non-radial Stators for Noise Reduction. National Aeronautics and Space Administration.
