= Andhra Pradesh Library Association =

Indian state library association (founded 1914)

- Formation: 10 April 1914; 112 years ago
- Type: Non-profit organization
- Purpose: Spreading literacy, knowledge and awareness among the public.
- Headquarters: Bhavanamu, Vijayawada, Andhra Pradesh, India
- Location: Vijayawada, Andhra Pradesh, India
- Region served: Andhra Pradesh, India
- Official language: Telugu
- President, General Secretary: K.C. Kalkura, Raavi Sarada
- Website: www.apla.co.in

The Andhra Pradesh Library Association was established on 10 April 1914. It is the oldest state library association in India. The association is headquartered at Vijayawada. The association emerged with a noble mission of spreading literacy, knowledge, and awareness among the public. Since its inception, the association has been functioning with the sole aim of taking library movement to the public.

== Formation ==
Andhra Library Movement and Andhra Library Association have had their origin with organizing Andhra Library Congress on 10 April 1914. Iyyanki Venkataramanaiah and Suri Venkata Narasimha Sastri initiated the formation of Association of Libraries of Andhra Area (Andhra Pradesha Grantha Bhandagara Sangham), which was later renamed as - Library Association of Andhra Area (Andhra Desa Granthalaya Sangham) and it became Andhra Pradesh Library Association (Andhra Pradesh Granthalaya Sangham) after the formation of Andhra Pradesh State. The Ramamohana Public Library, Vijayawada (formerly: Bezwada), organized "All India Conference of Library Organizers" and on the same day, the first Andhra Desa Library Congress was organized under the Chairmanship of Chilakamarti Lakshmi Narasimha Pantulu. His motivational message on this occasion was described as ‘Granthalaya Veda’ (Library Anthem) by Iyyanki Venkataramanaiah.
As a result of this conference, the Andhra Pradesha Grantha Bhandagara Sangham came into existence. At this congress, Dewan Bahadur Mocharla Ramachandra Rao Pantulu as the first President and Iyyanki Venkataramanaiah and Nalam Krishna Rao as first Secretaries of the association were elected.

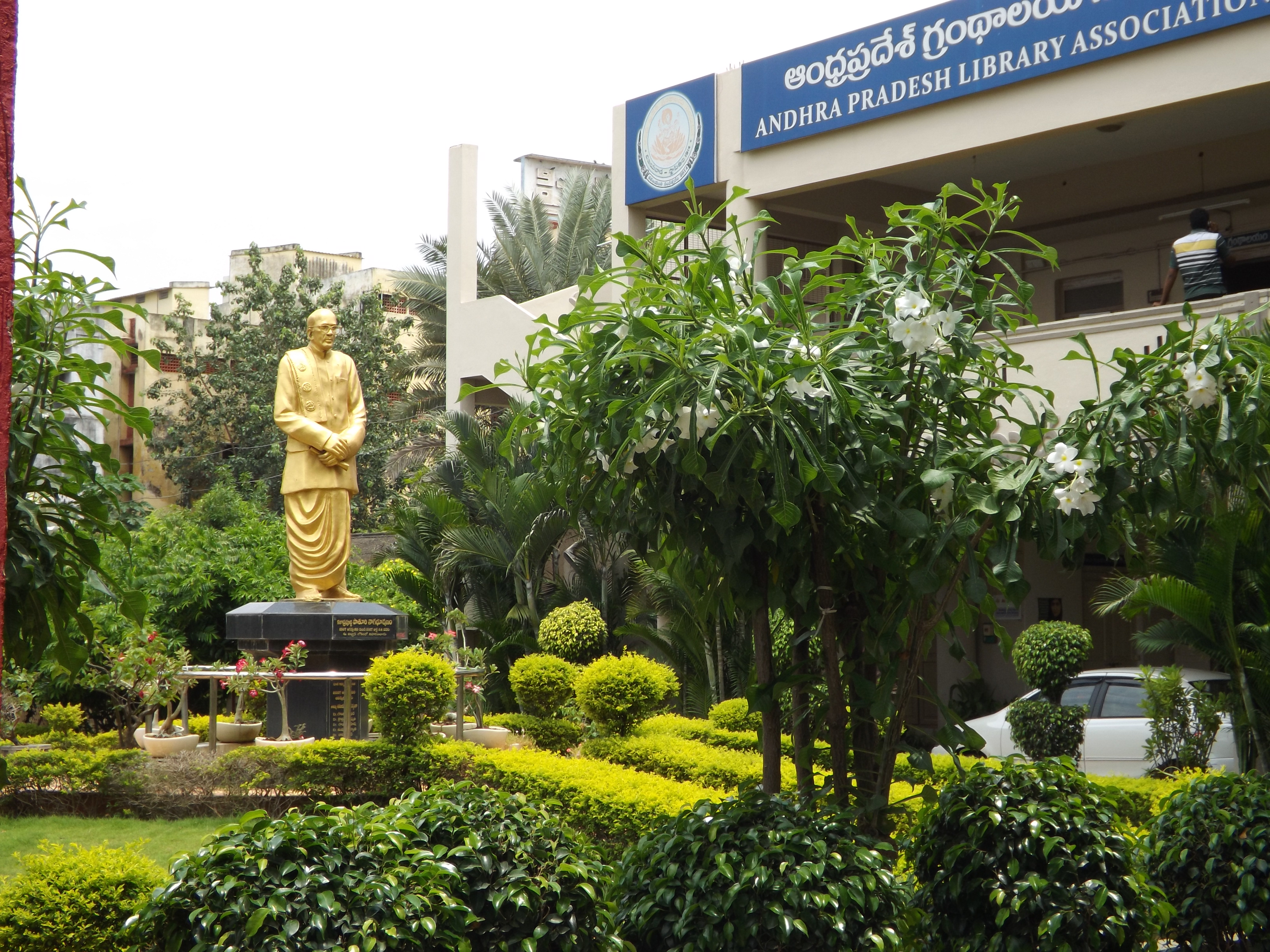
A.P. Library Association, Sarvottama bhavan Vijayawada (1)

== Library Anthem (Granthalaya Veda) ==
Suns light brightness everything, So shall knowledge dispel darkness And brightens every life;
Air gives life to all and is freely accessible, So Knowledge be within the reach of all Breathing life's vigour into them;
Clearwater quenches the thirst of all, So shall knowledge satisfy;
The curiosity of the all the curious, And the hunger of the hungry for it. ".

== Vision ==
- To work for the promotion of total literacy
- To establish libraries in every corner of the state
- To provide free access to information to the public
- To inculcate reading habit among the public
- To modernise libraries

== Pioneers ==
- Iyyanki Venkata Ramanaiah
- Gadicherla Hari Sarvottama Rao
- Paturi Nagabhushanam

== Executive Members ==
President: K.C. Kalkura
Vice-Presidents: K. Buchi Raju & V.Kesava Rao
Secretary: Raavi Sarada

== Firsts In Library Movement ==
1. APLA was the first library association in India established in 1914.
2. First to compile and publish a Library Directory as Directory of Andhra Libraries in 1915.
3. Grandhalaya Sarvaswam was the first vernacular library journal in India launched in 1916. The regional language journal in Telugu is still active in its publication every month including some special issues.
4. Responsible for the formation of All India Public Library Association
5. First Library association to conduct library training classes. In order to provide quality services in libraries in the state, the association initiated conducting training classes that have been continuing even now.
6. First Library journal from India in English.
7. Library Piligrimeges. Association conducted library pilgrimages for the promotion of library movement
8. First Boat Libraries (floating library services) in the world to spread awareness, knowledge to the public.
9. Instrumental in the formation of the Bengal Library Association, Madras Library Association, and many others.
10. Quality book supply to libraries by establishing a bookstall in 1944.
11. Formation of Andhra Grandhalaya Trust in 1946 is another landmark in the history of library movement in India. The philanthropy of Komma Seetaramaiah could provide a house to the library association-"Sarvottama Bhavanamu". It was first to have a house for an association, which was named after then Association's president Gadicherla Hari Sarvottama Rao. It was inaugurated in 1949.

== Association Activities ==
APLA is involved in printing, publishing books, journals in regional language Telugu, organising the teaching & training programs and furnishing information for the smooth functioning of various libraries.

- The APLA has been continuously publishing a monthly journal Granthalaya Sarvaswamu in Telugu since 1915. During 1939-41, the same periodical was published as a bilingual quarterly under the title Andhra Granthalayam for 3 years. The association also published a daily Andhra Patrika published articles on libraries and inspired people to participate in library movement and spread literacy during the pre-independence movement.
- The association has published books related to the library profession, adult education, agriculture.
- In the year 1920, Ayyanki Venkata Ramanaiah initiated organising training classes in library science, which was continued by the eminent personalities in the field such as - Vavilala Gopala Krishnaiah, Paturi Nagabhushanam, Kalidindi Narasimha Raju under the able guidance of Punyamurthula Rajasekharam and Kothari Ramarao, who were true disciples of S.R. Ranganathan. The training classes organised by them took the shape of regular certification programmes with the initiative of Paturi Nagabhushanam, so the school was named as Paturi Nagabhushanam School of Library Science. APLA is now conducted as a half-yearly certificate programme (CLISc) in both English and Telugu medium with hands-on experience in computer operations including library automation. It runs the course programme twice in June and December every year. The course and certificate offered by the School were recognised by the Department of Education, Government of Andhra Pradesh State.
- The association has been conducting conferences, seminars since the year 1914 under the leadership of eminent scholars, collaborating with several universities and organised more than 40 conferences/seminars.
- Free distribution of books: In order to inculcate the reading habit among people and to enhance the value of the precious books, the association launched the scheme of free distribution of books on 23/04/2015 in Vijayawada. The association since then has been collecting books from various authors, publishers, people as a donation and again distributing books to those interested and needed. For this purpose "Book Hundies" (Books collection boxes) are arranged in all major cities and district headquarters of the state and distributing books in their exhibition every year. The number of books freely distributed has been increasing every year and the activity also spread to several other places in the state. In 2015 they distributed 6000 books, subsequently 36000 in 2016, 42000 in 2017, and so on. APLA is getting ready with around 1 lakh books for distributing in 2020.
- Extending cooperation in establishing libraries, by making them aware of norms, bye-laws, registration procedures, and registers to be maintained.
- The association is maintaining a library called Sarvottama Granthalayam in its premises, contains books on all most all subjects.
- The association is operating a mobile library service to the public who cannot come to the library, coining its mantra -"Library its doorstep". The programme is named as Paturi Mobile Library. It was inaugurated on International Literacy Day i.e. 8 September and running in 6 places of the state.
- As a part of its centenary celebrations, the Sarvottama Granthalayam started an air-conditioned reading room in the name of Ayyanki Venkata Ramanaiah. This "Ayyanki Reading Room" is opened in all 365 days from 8 am-9 pm.
- Sarvottama Grandhalayam" inaugurated a special children library on 15 October 2016 in commemoration of the 85th birthday of A.P.J. Abdul Kalam, the former president of India and a renowned scientist. The Abdul Kalam Children's Library, apart from maintaining children books collection, it has been conducting children related activities on Sundays to promote creativity among them.

== Golden Jubilee Celebrations (1964 May 26–27) ==
The Andhra Pradesh Library Association has celebrated its Golden Jubilee for two days on May 26 and 27, 1964 at Vijayawada in Sarvottama Bhavanamu. On the first day, the program started with Saraswati Pooja at Ramamohana Library. Ayyanki Venkata Ramanaiah lit Jyothi and it was presented to the Committee Secretary Chennuppati SeshagiriRao. The Jyoti was taken up to Sarvottama Bhavan in a grand celebration of the procession and presented to the Association Secretary Paturi Nagabhushanam. Later on, a Conference of poets was conducted under the chairmanship of Viswanatha Satyanarayana. Several Telugu poets participated in this program including the secretary of the Association Paturi Nagabhushanam. In the evening, Acharya Rayaprolu Subbarao presided over the session of the Celebrations. The then state Law minister PV Narasimha Rao inaugurated the Celebrations. Then the community founders Ayyanki Venkata Ramanaiah and Komma Sitaramaiah were felicitated. On the second day, the conference papers presentation sessions were organized by the members of the association. It was chaired by Kodati Narayana Rao and Goparaju Ramachandra Rao. It was followed by a meeting of library workers and also a public meeting. Andhra Prabha editor Neelamraju Venkataseshaiah chaired the meeting, while Andhra Jyoti editor Narla Venkateswara Rao inaugurated. The Andhra Pradesh State Industrial Minister M.S.Laxminarasaya unveiled the publications of Golden Jubilee Proceedings of the Association - "Grandhaalaya Pragati" 13 volumes.

== Diamond Jubilee Celebrations (March 22, 1981) ==
The Association conducted 34th Andhra Pradesh Library Association Conference at "Orugallu" on 1981 March 22-21. The Diamond Jubilee was celebrated on the same occasion at the conference venue on March 22, 1981. More than 1000 fans and library activists from all over the state participated in the event. The dignitaries of the day include P.V.Narasimha Rao, External Affairs Minister, Government of India, T.Hayagrivachari, Technical Education Minister, Government of Andhra Pradesh, Majji Tulasidas, Small Industries Minister, Government of Andhra Pradesh and Kaloji Narayana Rao, the poet laureate of the Association. The well-known literary scholar Marupuru Kodandarami Reddy acted as the chairman. P.V.Narasimha Rao, External Affairs Minister, Government of India, rendered the presidential address. A number of writers, journalists, and other speakers have discussed issues in their speeches and provided suggestions.

== Platinum Jubilee Celebrations (10 April 1989) ==
The Andhra Pradesh Library Association Platinum Jubilee Celebrations were held at Vijayawada, Sarvottama Bhavanamu. The Association President Kodati Narayana Rao presided over the event. R.Krishna Murty, the Director of Andhra Pradesh Public Libraries, inaugurated the celebrations and M. V. Venkata Reddy, the Director of Andhra Pradesh Adult Literacy Programme unveiled the Golden Jubilee issue, the 50th volume of the association’s journal – “Granthalaya Sarvaswam.” The leader of the library movement, Vavilala Gopalakrishnayya, the Mayor of Vijayawada Jandhalaya Shankar and Member of Parliament Vadde Shobhanadeeswara Rao graced the stage.

== Notes ==
- Andhra Pradesh Library Association, K.Sarada, Andhra University Press, 1978.
