= Kaderbad Narasinga Rao =

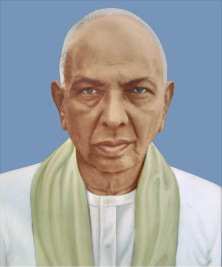
- Born: Kaderbad Narasinga Rao; 14 November 1888; Nandyal, Madras Presidency, British India (now in Andhra Pradesh, India)
- Died: 2 June 1963 (aged 74)
- Other name: Nandyal Gandhi
- Spouse: Adi Lakshamma
- Children: Seven sons and two daughters including Kaderbad Ravindranath
- Parent(s): Kaderbad Venkata Subbarao, Narasamma

Kaderbad Narasinga Rao, (sometimes spelled as Khaderbad), popularly known as "Nandyal Gandhi" (14 November 1888 – 2 June 1963), was a freedom fighter from Andhra Pradesh who fought for India's independence, philanthropist, social reformer, and political leader who worked tirelessly throughout his life to uplift disadvantaged people and eradicate untouchability.

Government of India brought out a special postal cover honoring him during the 75 year celebration of India's Independence.

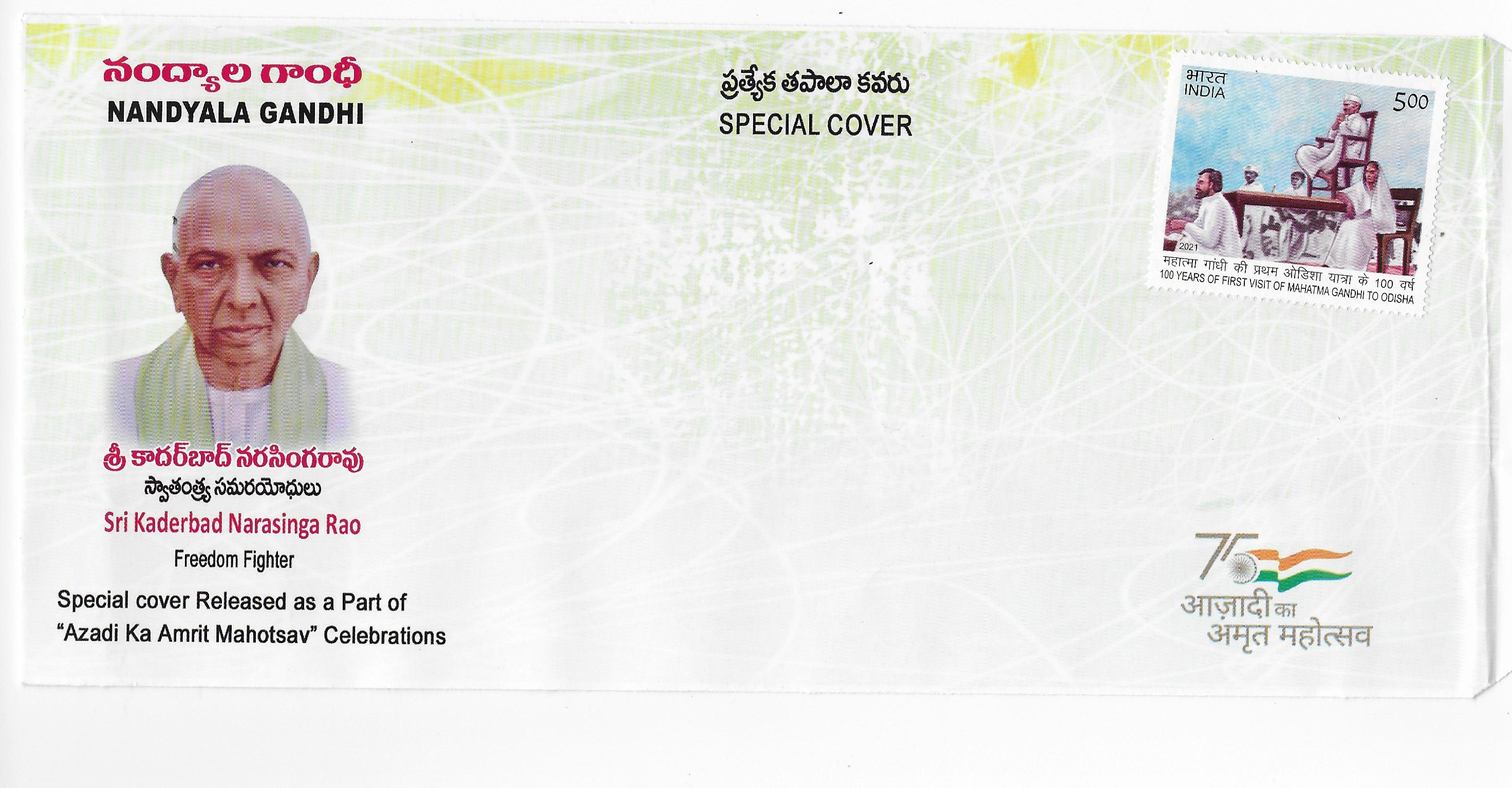
Special postal cover honoring Sri Kaderbad Narasinga Rao (popularly known as Nandyal Gandhi)

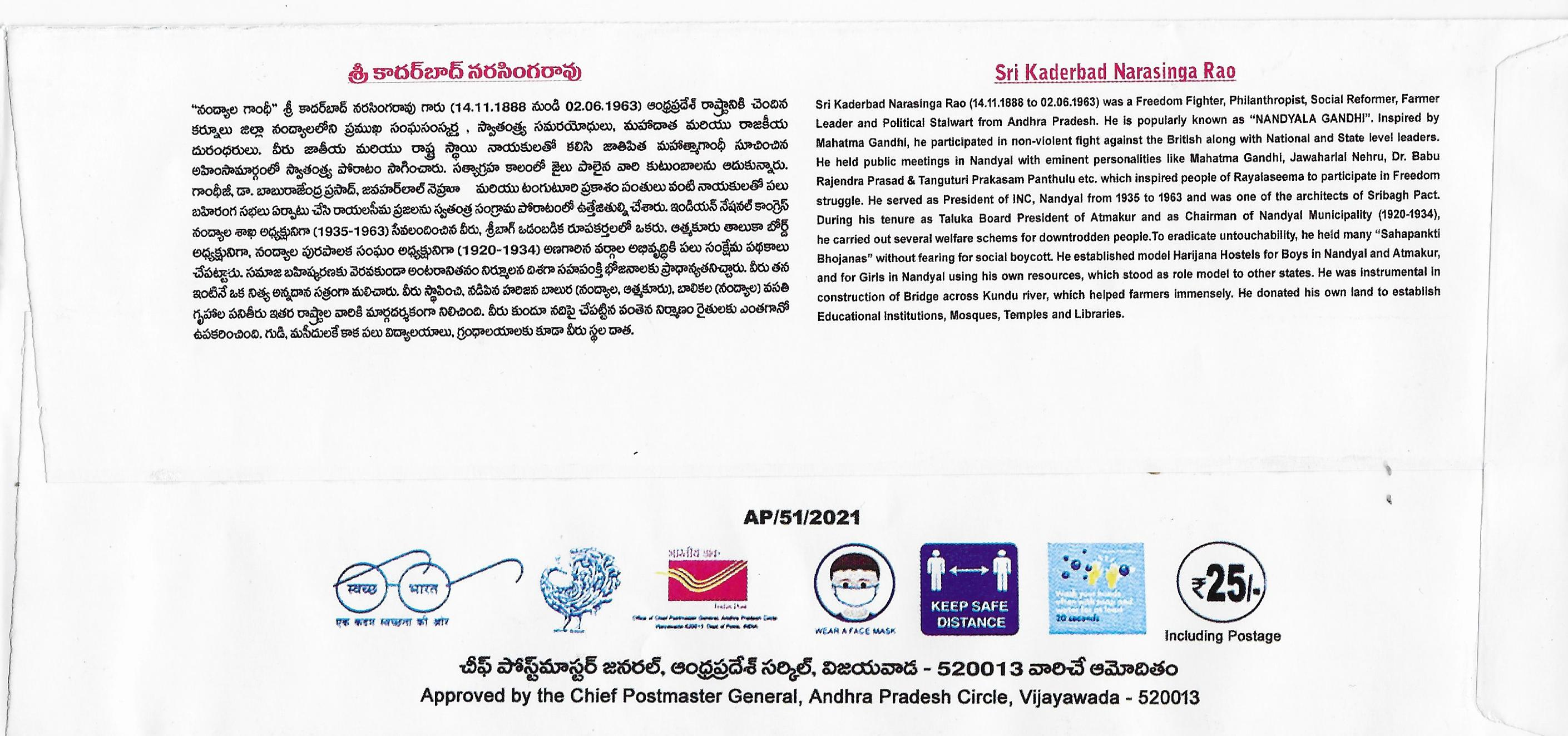
Special postal cover honoring Sri Kaderbad Narasinga Rao (popularly known as Nandyal Gandhi)

== Early life and education ==
Narasinga Rao was born in Nandyal in (Madras Presidency of India) on 14 November 1888 to Sri Kaderbad Venkata Subbarao, an attorney and Smt. Narasamma. They belonged to a traditional Hindu Brahmin family.

After completing his primary education in public school, he joined S.P.G High School run by Christian Missionaries. After graduating from high school, he was admitted to Madras Christian College in Madras (present day Chennai) where he completed his Intermediate studies. Influenced by the Indian freedom struggle and Mahatma Gandhi, he decided not to pursue his B.A and joined politics instead.

== Philanthropy and Social Reforms ==
Though Narasinga Rao was born into a traditional Brahmin Family, he was deeply influenced by the efforts of Mahatma Gandhi to eradicate untouchability in the society.

Moved by the plight of poor people (called untouchables in those days), he strived throughout his life to integrate them into society and provide them economic opportunities and equal social status.

He ignored the threat of social boycott by fellow Brahmins and participated in "sahapankti-bhojanam" (eating along) with the down trodden untouchables. His stature, wealth, political influence, and social status gradually forced other members of his community and others to follow his reforms.

He correctly identified that the lack of opportunities for getting education was the root cause of their economic and social struggles. Poverty and hunger were the main impediments.

Using his own resources, he established a "Harijan Boys Hostel" where children of poor people were provided with room to stay, food to eat, and education. Children educated in this hostel have become doctors, engineers, lawyers, and Indian Administrative Service(IAS) officers. They, their children, and their grandchildren have played, and continue to play, a critical role in Indian society.

He later established a hostel for the Harijan girls also.

He donated his own land for the construction of a Mosque in Nandyal.

He, along with his friend and neighbour Gadicherla Harisarvottama Rao started the Library Movement. They established the "Edward Corporation Library (currently called "Victoria Reading Room") in Nandyal. He donated his land for this library

== Help to Farmers ==
Although he was personally wealthy with more than 1,200 acres of agricultural land, he always helped poor farmers. Using his influence and contacts with political leaders and high officials in the administration, he started several programs that helped poor farmers. He was instrumental in getting a bridge constructed across the Kundu River that helped these farmers more easily reach their lands, even during the rainy season and floods. He was known for his unselfish nature. Thousands of Below Poverty Line("BPL") families in Nandyal received monetary benefits from him.

== Political career ==
He was elected to the Taluka Board and served as the President of Atmakur (in present-day Kurnool District of Andhra Pradesh) and later Nandyal for 15 years. He also served as the Chairman of Nandyal Municipality for 14 years (from 1920 to 1934). He served as the Congress Party (Indian National Congress) President of Nandyal from 1935 to 1963 (till his death). He was elected unanimously every year.

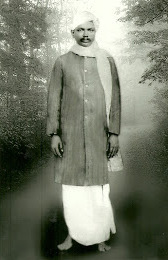
Kaderbad Narasinga Rao in official dress of Municipal Chairman of Nandyal, India

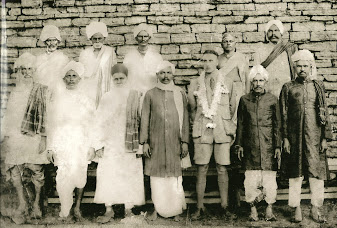
Kaderbad Narasinga Rao with the Collector of Cuddapah, India

During this period, he worked tirelessly for the welfare of the people and spread education in Nandyal. In 1925, he donated four acres of prime real estate that he owned in the heart of the town for the construction of the Municipal High School. As a mark of respect, this school was renamed as "Kaderbad Narasinga Rao Memorial Municipal High School" in 2005 and his statue was unveiled in its premises by Sri Pendekanti Venkatasubbaiah former deputy Home minister, Government of India, New Delhi and former Governor of Bihar and Karnataka. Children educated in this school have occupied important positions around the world.

He was also influenced by the principles of Mahatma Gandhi and followed him in the non-violent fight against the British Rule. He was affectionately called "Nandyal Gandhi."

In 1930, when Mahatma Gandhi visited Nandyal, Narasinga Rao played host to Gandhiji in his house. He presided over a public meeting with Gandhiji and translated Gandhiji's speech into native Telugu language. These efforts inspired the people of Rayalaseema to participate in the freedom struggle.

In 1937, he successfully arranged Madras State Conference, which was appreciated by Sri C. Rajagopalachari, Premier of Madras.

In 1935, Dr. Rajendra Prasad visited Nandyal and held a public meeting. Narasinga Rao presided over the public meeting and translated his speech. He also hosted him in his house. Later in 1952, he visited Nandyal again as India's first President.

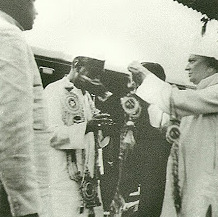
Kaderbad Narasinga Rao with President of India Rajendra Prasad

In 1952, Narasinga Rao invited the first Prime Minister of India, Pundit Jawaharlal Nehru, to Nandyal and arranged a grand meeting at Nandyal Railway Station. During this meeting, he brought the problems of the people in this region to the Prime Minister's attention.

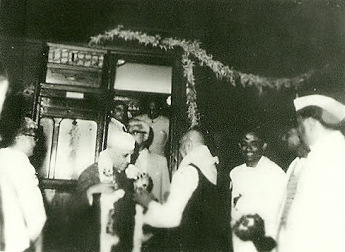
Kaderbad Narasinga Rao with Prime Minister Jawaharlal Nehru

He also played host to Dr. Sarvepalli Radhakrishnan (who was later to become President of India,1962–67) and V. V. Giri, (who was later to become President of India, 1969–74) when they visited Nandyal.

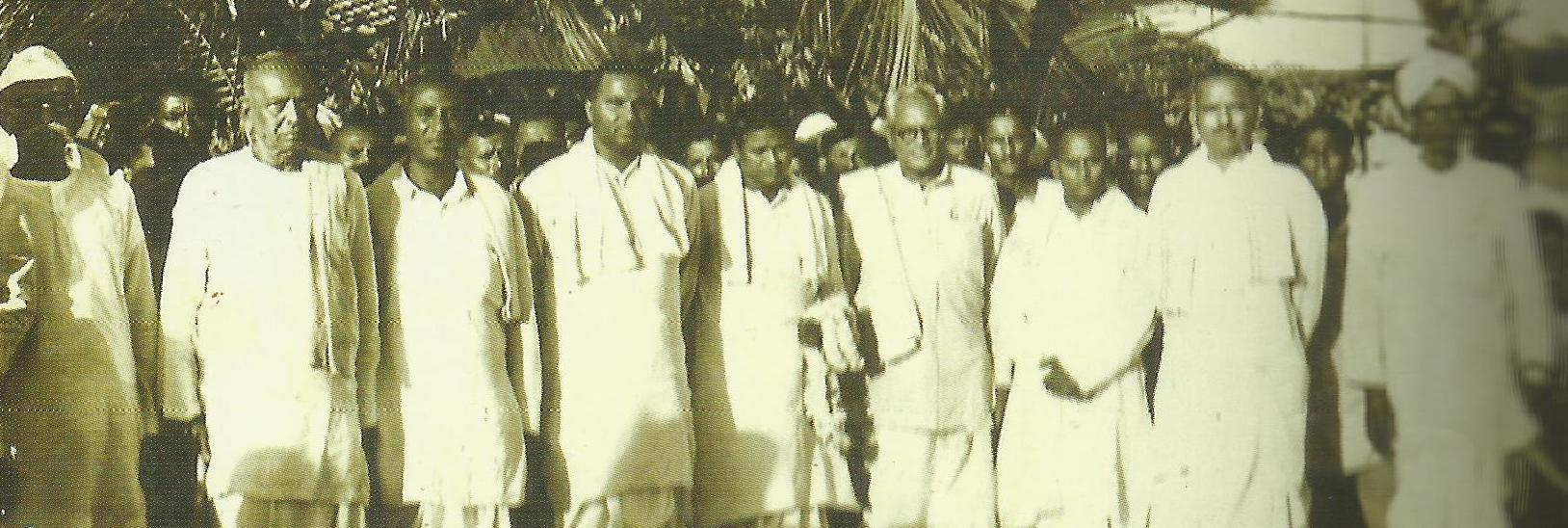
Kaderbad Narasinga Rao with Sanjeevayya Minister of Andhra Pradesh

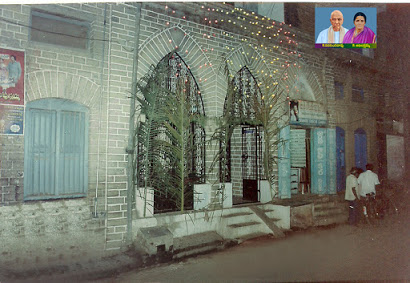
Residence of Kaderbad Narasinga Rao where he hosted National leaders of India

He hosted several top national and state leaders in his house. Some of these leaders included: Freedom fighter Syed Biyabani (later served as Member of Legislative Assembly); Kallur Subba Rao (freedom fighter); Tanguturi Prakasam Pantulu (Chief Minister of Madras and later Andhra Pradesh); Tenneti Viswanadham (Minister of Finance); Peddireddy Timma Reddy (Minister of Agriculture); N. G. Ranga (after whom the Andhra Pradesh Agricultural University is named); Bhogaraju Pattabhi Sitaramayya (Founder of Andhra Bank); S.K.Day (Minister of Local Administration). Most of these leaders were his close friends.

Along with Gadicherla Harisarvottama Rao, who was his neighbor, he played an important part in the negotiations and drafting of Sribagh Pact (Sribagh Agreement). Both of them played a critical role in safeguarding the rights and also explaining it to the people of Rayalaseema and gaining their acceptance.

He mentored several Congress leaders who later became governors, ministers, and other prominent leaders. He never aspired for any other political office in government.

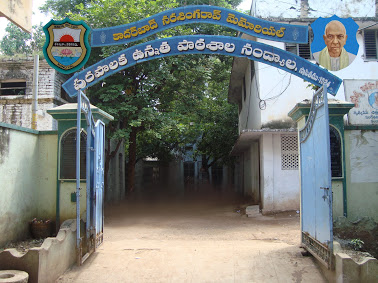
Nandyal Municipal High School named after Kaderbad Narsinga Rao

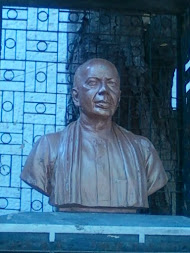
Statue of Kaderbad Narasinga Rao in Municipal High School Nandyal

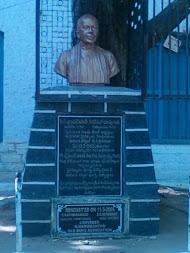
Statue of Kaderbad Narasinga Rao in Municipal High School in Nandyal

== Family ==
Narasinga Rao was married to (Karanam) Adi Lakshamma. They had seven sons and two daughters who have become doctors, engineers, attorneys, educators, and scientists.

His children and grandchildren continued his tradition of social service. Prominent among them are his son Kaderbad Ravindranath and grandson Dr. Kaderbad Uday shankar.

Kaderbad Ravindranath is an agricultural scientist and cotton breeder. He recently received the Life Time Achievement Award for his contributions including the development of a Cotton variety named "Narasimha." Narasimha is widely used as a parent line by more than 20 leading cotton seed manufacturers in their cotton hybrid seed program. The Cotton hybrids made from Narasimha are cultivated in over one crore (10 million) acres of land all over India, earning more than Rs 300 Crore (Rs 3 billion) to the National Exchequer.

Following in his father's footsteps, Mr. Ravindranath interacted with Prime Minister P.V. Narasimha Rao, who was elected from Nandyal, as well as governors, and central ministers. He invited them to Nandyal and brought problems faced by residents of the region, especially poor farmers, to their attention. He is the President of "Nandi Rythu Samakya," which provides advice and help to poor and marginal farmers in sustainable cultivation practices.

Dr. Kaderbad Uday Shankar is a popular physician in Nandyal. He is instrumental in establishing "Sangha Mitra" a home for destitute children where they are provided shelter, food and education. He also runs "Sharada Vidya Peeth" a model school for poor children.

His organization also serves the needs of tribal people (Chenchu tribe) in the Nallamala Forest spanning Kurnool and Prakasam districts in Andhra Pradesh. Every month a doctor and supporting staff visit each of the thirty settlements and provide health checkups and free medicines for them.

Narasinga Rao died on 2 June 1963.
