= Paturi Nagabhushanam =

Leader of library movement in Andhra Pradesh. Educator

- The doyen of the Andhra Library Movement from Andhra Pradesh, India.
- Born: 20 August 1907; Pedapalem village, near Tenali, Guntur District of Andhra Pradesh State, India
- Died: 24 July 1987 (aged 79); Mumbai
- Occupations: Librarian, Author, Library Science Educator, Social Activist
- Spouse: Chandramolaka Rajesweramma
- Children: Late Sri Suri Babu, and two daughters Late Smt Sujata and Dr (Smt) Sarada
- Parent(s): Paturi Burraiah (father) and Smt. Paturi Dharinamma (mother)
- Awards: Kala Prapurna, Yarlagadda Rajyalakshmi Venkanna Choudhary Kala Peetham Award

Paturi Nagabhushanam (20 August 1907 – 24 July 1987) was described as the doyen of the Andhra Library Movement from Andhra Pradesh, India. Paturi was associated with the national independence movement and an ardent follower of Gandhi. His contributions are noteworthy - in spreading library movement in the state of Andhra Pradesh among the public, strengthening Andhra Pradesh Library Association propagating adult literacy, the establishment of library school for imparting training to library workers and giving library education under State government certification and publishing books, periodicals, LIS textbooks. He is the founder of Sarvottama Granthalayam in Vijayawada.

== Biography ==
=== Early life ===
Nagabhushanam was the first child born in a middle-class orthodox farmer's family to Paturi Burraiah (father) and Smt. Paturi Dharinamma (mother) in Pedapalem village, near Tenali, Guntur District of Andhra Pradesh State, India on 20 August 1907.

=== Education and training ===
After his primary, secondary schooling in Pedapalem, Kuchipudi and Nidubrolu villages, and intermediate studies at Layola College, Madras, Paturi Nagabhushanam received Library Workers Training organised by the Andhra Pradesh Library Association for summer in 1934. Further, he obtained a Diploma in Library Science (D.L.Sc.) from Andhra University 2 years of Summer School during 1936–38. He also received Training conducted for Adult Education Teachers at the state level conducted by Madras Government at Vijayawada and also a one-month training program organised for the Writers of Adult Education Materials at Mysore in 1953.

=== Marriage and children ===
He married Ramineni Chandramolaka Rajesweramma at an early age, while studying Intermediate course. He had a son Late Sri Suri Babu, and two daughters Late Smt Sujata and Dr (Smt) Sarada.

- [Dr (Smt) Sarada] - The General Secretary of Andhra Pradesh Library Association and the Editor of Grandhalaya Sarvaswamu since the year 1988.

=== Demise ===
He took his last breath in the presence of his family members and the members of the association executive body, on 24 July 1987 at his 80, while undergoing treatment for cancer in Bombay (now Mumbai).

== In National Movement ==
Paturi Nagabhushanam was associated with national movement from the student stage. When he was a student of Loyola College, Madras, he worked as a volunteer for the All India Congress Conference in Madras and also participated in an agitation organised against Simon Commission in Madras. He also took part in Salt Satyagraha and imprisoned as a political detainee for one year in Alipur Camp Jail near Bellary. He was again imprisoned for another 6 months in 1932, for participating in the Civil Disobedience Movement. Paturi also worked during Quit India Movement in 1942, secretly couriering newspapers and pamphlets. He had cordial relationships with famous personalities of national movement like Dr. J.N. Melkote, Sri Ramanand Tirtha, Sri Jamalapuram Kesava Rao, Sri Madapati Hanumantha Rao, Sri K.V.Narasinga Rao, Sri Suravaram Pratapareddy, and others. The government of India recognised Paturi as a freedom fighter and presented the citation on the Bronze leaf.

Paturi was an ardent follower of Mahatma Gandhi. He was a member of the Andhra Pradesh State Board for Gandhi Memorial Fund for 15 years. He took charge as Gandhi Tatva Pracharak (Campaigner) of Vijayawada Centre and published pamphlets promoting Khadi sales, cotton weaving, upliftment of Harijans, removal of untouchability and village industries. He wore Khadi throughout his life and gave utmost importance to Gandhi's Safai programs involving in the cleanliness of surroundings, self-help, etc. He was a member of the editorial board, Gandhian Literature Publication Committee. On the occasion of Gandhiji Centenary Celebrations, he translated 10 works from different languages on glimpses of significant aspects of Mahatma's life history and gifted them to young boys and girls. He has set up a National educational school in the name of "Seva Asramam" (Service Centre) in his native village 'Pedapalem' in the year 1928 joining with Mellacheruvu Venkateswarlu, who took training in Gandhiji's Sabarmati Ashram in Gujarat. In Seva Asramam, he organised programmes like - propagation of Hindi along with regional language Telugu, following Gandhian principles like - making yarn from cotton, khadi promotion, reconstruction of villages, upliftment of Harijans, etc. He also established Naturopathy Hospital, Khadi Swadesi items Store to supplement the Seva Asramam programs in order to encourage the use of Indian goods, naturopathy. He further promoted agriculture, animal husbandry.

He was behind the establishment of a school called "Navya Bharati" in a remote village - Revendrapadu of Guntur District, with residential facilities with an aim to promote vocational programs, to inculcate the hidden capabilities in the students along with formal education. Paturi also started Sarvodaya Press in Vijayawada in 1950, appointing women for composing, binding and printing, etc. to support their economic empowerment. He functioned as the Director of Chemicals Limited, Nidadavole and Sramajeevi Press, Madras. Paturi served Akademi Andhra Pradesh Sahithya Akademi as a member for five years

== In Library Movement, Association and Education ==
In Andhra Pradesh State, the library movement was launched by Sri Ayyanki Venkata Ramanaiah, and it was further lead and spread by Sri Paturi in multidimensional ways. Paturi's contributions to the spread of library movement, library education and to the Andhra Pradesh Library Association for more than five decades were highly significant.

- He strived in the propagation of excellent literary works, the publication of manuscript journal, Library adult education movement. He along with his other associates rejuvenated a ruining library in his native village called "Arya Bala Samajam" and re-established the same as "Sevasrama Vani Mandiram" in January 1930 in a new building under the auspices of Seva Asramam.
- He assumed the charge as Secretary of Guntur Library Association in 1935 and set up libraries in about 160 villages in the district and also played a key role in the construction of new buildings for 28 libraries.
- He started an innovative programme of setting up of "Boat Libraries", under the auspices of Seva Asramam during 1935–42 to create reading interest among the public. The first boat library launched in the Krishna Bank Canal between Pedavadlapudi and Kolluru on 25 October 1935, and another one 17 November 1935 from Pedavadlapudi and Pidaparru in Guntur district. This became a national sensation and paved the way to set up many more "Boat Libraries".
- He is one of the five-member sub-committee set up by the state government for preparing the draft of the Andhra Pradesh Public Library Act.
- He acquired an acre of land in the heart of Vijayawada city and constructed Sri Sarvottama Bhavanam in 1949 with the philanthropic donations and built another storey for Bapuji Mandir in 1958. Similarly, he constructed Jogi Raju Bhavan in 1960 for workers accommodation and Ramineni Sadan in 1983.
- Paturi lead Andhra Pradesh Library Association for five decades and set up district-level branches in all the districts to spread the association activities at the rural level, for which he visited all the districts and libraries. He acquired crores worth properties to fortify the association activities and to create amenities for it.
- In order to enhance good public relations for the libraries and to extend its activities, he had celebrated Grandhalaya Vasantotsavalu (Library Spring Festival) first in 1952 ('Nandana' year) in summer every year. This 5 days activity was continued for many years. These celebrations were praised by the world-renowned library science professor in India Dr. S.R.Ranganathan.
- He established Sarvottama Library (Grandhalayam) in the year 1987, which has now grown to a large extent and being used by hundreds of students, self-employment trainees, etc.
- He was the editor of the monthly magazine "Grandhalaya Sarvaswam", the voice of library movement, for more than 36 years from 12 to 48 volumes. This is acclaimed as the only library science magazine in the country.
- Paturi organised several training camps for library workers and prepared hundreds of library volunteers. In 1966 he started a Certificate course in Library Science which was duly recognised by the Andhra Pradesh state government.

== As a publisher, editor and writer ==
Paturi's published works in regional language Telugu include - 15 Indigenous Works, 15 Translated works into Telugu, 6 Compilations, 19 Editorial Works, and other publications. He prepared textbooks according to the syllabus of the Certificate Course in Library Science in Telugu language and published them. They also became reference books for library science. Paturi published 20 volumes of books written by a popular farming expert Sri Goteti Jogi Raju on agriculture and farming before 5 decades. They were considered as authentic sources on the subject and revised by the agricultural scientists from time to time. He published and propagated books on adult education written by Sri Gadicherla Hari Sarvottama Rao, the pioneer in the adult literacy movement of the time. They were - Vayojana Vidya 1,2,3 Volumes (Books on Adult Education) and Vayojana Vachakalu (Adult Education Readers). He organised the Centenary celebration of Sri Gadicherla in important towns of many districts of the state and also published the Centenary Commemorative issue entitled "Vandemataram" for about 400 pages. Paturi was the editor of 24 to 28 Andhra Pradesh Library Association Conference Volumes and the associate editor for "Andhra Grandhalayam", the quarterly periodical for Volume 2. For more than 36 years, he held the responsibility as the editor for the monthly periodical Grandhalaya Sarvaswam, volumes 13 to 48 and also a popular index to Telugu literature "Andhra Vajmaya Sangraha Suchika" which was compiled by Sri Velaga Venkatappayya and Mahidhara Jaganmohana Rao and published by the Association in 1962.

== Honours ==
Paturi was recognised as the pioneer of library movement. Paturi was honoured by Andhra University, Visakhapatnam for his involvement in the national independence movement, contributions in spreading library movement in the state in multiple dimensions - as a social activist, propagator of adult literacy, greatest efforts in library education, publications activity and conferred with the honorary doctorate - "Kala Prapurna" in the year 1975. On the occasion, he was felicitated by the Department of Library Science, University Library, Sarvottama Bhavan School of Library Science and many more educational, literary, social organisations. He was honoured in First World Telugu Conference, Hyderabad. He also received Yarlagadda Rajyalakshmi Venkanna Choudhary Kala Peetham Award. He was invited by the Andhra University to felicitate, as the first student of the Department of Library Science in the year 1987 on the occasion of university's Golden Jubilee Celebrations. The Telugu Federation of Delhi had arranged to felicitate Paturi as he was one of the most influential personalities in Andhra Pradesh and for his contribution to the upliftment of library movement in the state. Unfortunately, this could not happen due to his ill health.

The great Telugu poet "Karunasri (Jandhyala Papayya Sastry") described that - "He is humane university; He is the moving library" The most popular socialist leader late Sri Acharya N.G.Ranga designated him as - "Sarasvati Pujari" (Priest of Goddess 'Sarasvati'). S.R. Ranganathan described him as "one of the few persistent and staunch devotees of Library Science, which mother India produced". Sri Suravaram Pratapa Reddy praised him as "one who dedicated his life to the cause of the Library movement". Gadicherla Harisarvothama Rao said that Nagabhushanam stands for the word ‘Library'.

== Birth centenary ==
Paturi's Centenary celebrations were organised statewide by Andhra Pradesh Library Association (APLA) and Paturi Nagabhushanam Centenary Celebration Committee from 20 August 2006 to 20 August 2007. The Centenary celebrations were inaugurated by the then chief minister of the state Dr.Y.S.Rajasekhar Reddy in Hyderabad on 20 August 2006. State ministers Sri K. Rosaiah, Smt.N.Rajyalakshmi participated in the occasion. The District Central Libraries in Kurnool, Anantapur, Medak, Karimnagar, Nalgonda districts, and the libraries in several districts and also the college libraries such as ANR in Gudivada, DRN in Chilakaluripeta, CR Reddy PG College in Eluru and KVR in Nandigama joined in celebrating the occasion in their premises. Subsequently, the leaders of the library movement of the Rayalseema region celebrated Paturi's Centenary in Anantapur district on 10 September 2006 under the guidance of Sri Battula Venkatarami Reddy. In Rajamahendravaram, the event was celebrated in Rajamahendrapura Mandira Grandhalayam on 17 September 2006. Similarly, the celebrations were conducted by Machilipatnam Grandhalayam Vikas Samiti, Visakhapatnam Poura Grandhalayam (Public Library) and Vijayawada Book Festival. The concluding ceremony of 'the centenary celebrations of Sri Paturi Nagabhushanam', the doyen of Library Movement in AP was organised by the Andhra Pradesh Library Association at their National Conference on "Reorientation of Library services in India" held at Vijayawada from 18 to 20 August 2007.

== Conclusion ==
He did not pause his activities related to association, writings, even when he was severely ill and taking treatment for cancer. He was worried about the continuation of library movement, association, Sarvottama (library) Grandhalayam, Library School and the monthly periodical Grandhalaya Sarvaswam, for which dedicated his entire life. His commitment is well understood from his final words - "I have no other desire except that - if I had a chance I wish to be reborn here and serve this library association in the same way".

The Andhra Pradesh Library Association has completed 100 years and celebrated the centenary in the year 2014 successfully going forward, expanding its activities while continuing his legacy and the values set by Paturi
