= Warrington Perambulating Library =

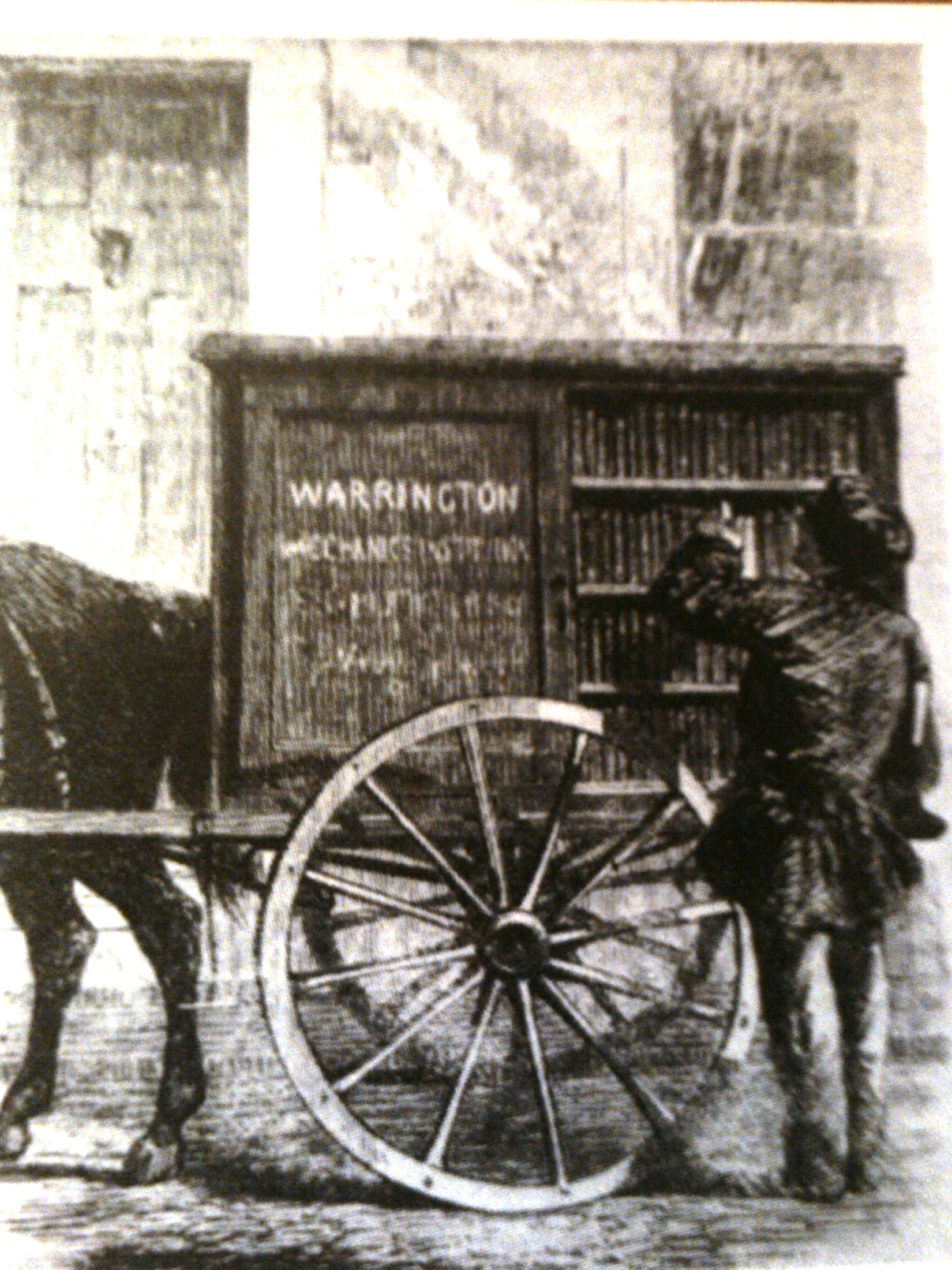
The Warrington Perambulating Library, from an 1860 edition of The Illustrated London News

The Warrington Perambulating Library has been described by historian Ian Orton as "one of the most revolutionary library advances of the nineteenth century". Among the earliest mobile libraries in the UK, it was set up by the Warrington Mechanics' Institute in Cheshire, England in 1858. Keen to increase borrowing from its library, the institute determined in the summer of that year to raise money for the purchase of a one-horse van, which it planned to fill with books and send each week "to every door in Warrington and the vicinity".

The idea was taken up enthusiastically by local residents, who organised a flower show and bazaar to raise funds. An October 1858 account in the Warrington Guardian reported that:

Not only have many of our wealthy townsmen given their pounds, but women – some of them poor widows – have given their mites. Two hundred working men's wives and daughters, at their homes, have stitched, darned or knitted articles for the Bazaar.

The event raised £250 (equivalent to £27,000 in 2025 (Note: UK Consumer Price Index inflation figures from 1209–2024 based on data from "Inflation calculator", Bank of England, London, 18 February 2026)), allowing the perambulating library to begin touring the streets of Warrington on 15 November 1858. It was an immediate success, and resulted in the number of books borrowed from the institute's library increasing from 3000 a year to 12,000. The service continued until 1872.
