= The Free Black Women's Library =

Literary organization in New York City

The Free Black Women's Library is an organization that hosts a mobile library based primarily in New York City, and is focused on sharing literature written by Black women. It was founded by the Nigerian American Ola Ronke Akinmowo in Brooklyn in 2015.

== History ==
The library was founded by Ola Ronke Akinmowo in 2015. Initially, Akinmowo used social media to ask people to send her any books written by Black women. After some weeks, Akinmowo received about 100 books for her project. The library's holdings grew to about 450 books in 2016, and to about 1000 books in 2018. One reason for this growth was because the library required visitors to donate a book in order to borrow them.

Akinmowo's work in developing this mobile library also served as inspiration for other mobile libraries focused on specific groups, such as Pilipinx American Library.

== Pop-up libraries ==
Events through the Free Black Women's Library typically involve Akinmowo physically bringing the book collection to different places, such as street corners and community spaces. Initially, this was done using a bike trailer when the collection was small, but is now typically done by car with the help of friends or community groups. The collection includes works from many authors, such as such as Octavia Butler, Audre Lorde, Monique W. Morris, Zora Neale Hurston, and Toni Morrison. The organization hosts temporary libraries in different neighborhoods of New York City on a monthly basis, such as Bed-Stuy, and has also been present at the NY Art Book Fair. It has also hosted libraries in other locations around the United States, such as in Chicago, Philadelphia, Baltimore, Atlanta and Detroit. In addition, the library hosts events such as film screenings, workshops and live performances. The library continues to maintain a policy that visitors who come to the mobile library to take a book should also leave one written by a Black woman.

In 2019, Asha Grant founded the Los Angeles chapter of the Library, which continues to operate in a mobile capacity through direct donations and trade at pop-up locations, or at selected drop-off centers that "actively support marginalized communities." In July 2020, Grant announced a permanent space in Los Angeles, a bookstore named Salt Eaters in Inglewood, "where young Black girls, women, femmes and gender-nonconforming people never have to search for stories that represent them, because they will be front and center".

In 2024, the Atlanta branch of The Free Black Women's Library went off of hiatus and has been having pop up book and writing events across Atlanta.

The Atlanta branch services all Black people while the original mobile library is specifically for Black women.
