= Bookleggers Library =

Miami mobile library nonprofit

Bookleggers is a nonprofit mobile library located in Miami, Florida that expands access to free books as a way of building community.

== History and mission ==
Bookleggers was founded in 2012 by Nathaniel Sandler. Founded with the mission to save books and share them with the community for free. Sandler stated, "We're trying to keep history, culture, and books alive."

Since its beginning, Bookleggers brought free books to people in South Florida. Through pop-up events and partnerships with organizations like O’Miami, The Underline, and Bakehouse Art Complex, Bookleggers has circulated over 35,000 books making reading accessible to more in the city. Its mission gained increasing significance as bookstores faced closures and libraries struggled with budget cuts.

Bookleggers has been an active participant in local events throughout South Florida, bringing free books to communities from the Everglades National Park and Key West to Biscayne Bay.

Bookleggers has rescued books from across South Florida, including a significant haul from the Miami Herald's former office building. The Miami community has also played a crucial role in building Bookleggers' collection, donating a diversity of literature.

In 2020, the organization received a $250,000 grant from the Knight Foundation to support its digital expansion and post-COVID adaptation. This funding enabled Bookleggers to develop programs, fund staff and leadership, and evolve as a donation-based library reflecting Miam's cultural diversity.

== Programming ==
Bookleggers programming has changed in response to community needs incorporating new dimensions that Sandler refers to as “bookmobility”. With both in-person events and digital programs, Bookleggers have developed different projects such as Bookbike, library trailer, Adventure-leggers and installations. At the same time they have created a digital presence with projects such as Booklandia and Storytime Podcast.
