= Kaderbad Ravindranath =

Indian botanist

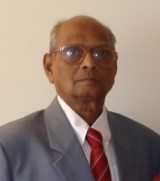
Kaderbad Ravindranath

Kaderbad Ravindranath (born 4 January 1936) is an Indian agricultural research scientist and cotton breeder. In 2015, he received the Life Time Achievement Award for his contributions to the cotton research.

He developed a new cotton variety named Narasimha which is used as a parent line for cotton hybrid seed programs. The hybrids made of Narasimha are cultivated in over 10 million acres contributing a tax amount of Rs 3 billion on sale of cotton and seed.

== Early life and education ==
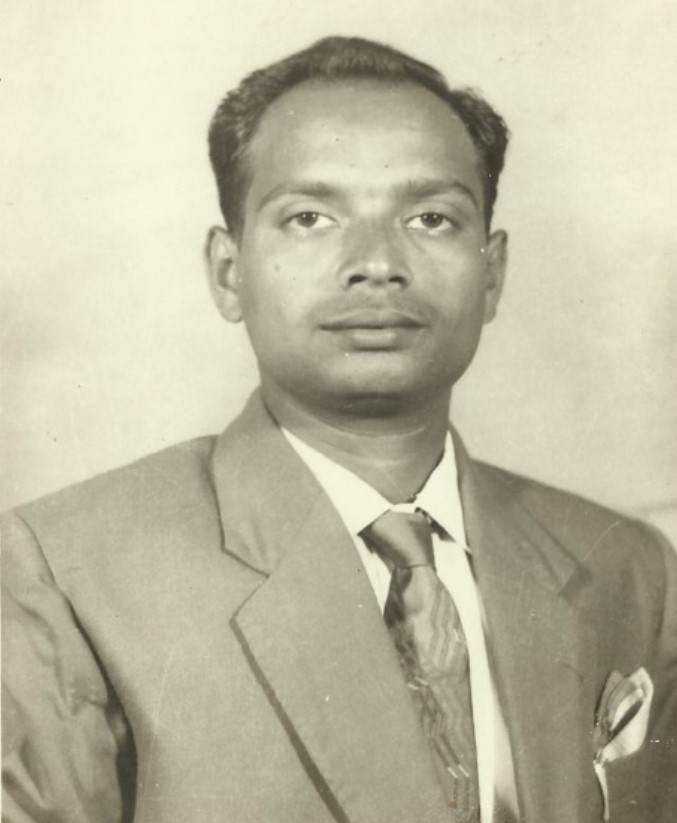
Kaderbad as a young researcher in RARS

Kaderbad Ravindranath was born in Nandyal in Madras Presidency of India on 4 January 1936, to Sri Kaderbad Narasinga Rao and Smt. (Karanam) Adi Lakshamma. He grew up in a family of seven brothers and two sisters. His father Sri Kaderbad Narasinga Rao was a philanthropist, social reformer, freedom fighter and chairman of the Nandyal Municipality for 14 continuous years.

He graduated from Presidency College, Chennai with B.Sc. in biology. He earned a B.Sc. in agriculture from Agricultural College, Bapatla, and a M.Sc. in agriculture from Acharya N.G. Ranga Agricultural University (ANGRAU), Hyderabad, with specialization in genetics and plant breeding.

== Regional Agricultural Research Station ==
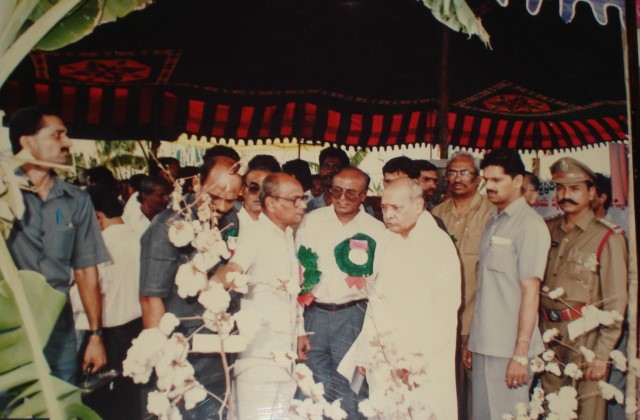
Kaderbad Ravindranath with Sri P. V. Narasimha Rao, Prime Minister of India during the release of Narasimha seed to farmers

He worked at the Acharya N. G. Ranga Agricultural University (ANGRAU) Regional Agricultural Cotton Research Station for 36 years from 1959 to 1996 in various capacities. He published more than 60 scientific papers in the Indian Journal of Plant Breeding and Genetics, Journal of Indian Society for Cotton Improvement, Madras Agricultural Journal, Andhra Agricultural Journal, as well as several review papers pertaining to cotton improvement.

During his work at ANGRAU, he developed ten new cotton varieties (Narasimha, Aravinda, Big boll hirsutum cotton-HYPS 156, and others) and two hybrids (NHH 390 and NCA 216) of cotton, which were released and notified by the Central Variety Release Committees of the Indian government. The Narasimha variety was used as a parent line in a number of hybrids, while NCA-216 was developed for increased yield under rain-fed conditions.

He also participated in radio programs on All India Radio stations for Kadapa and Kurnool to advise farmers in cotton cultivation. He conducted more than 40 training programs to extension staff of the Department of Agriculture of Andhra Pradesh, and trained farmers in cotton cultivation under the Andhra Pradesh Well Project and the WALAMTARI organization.

== ICMF-CDRA ==
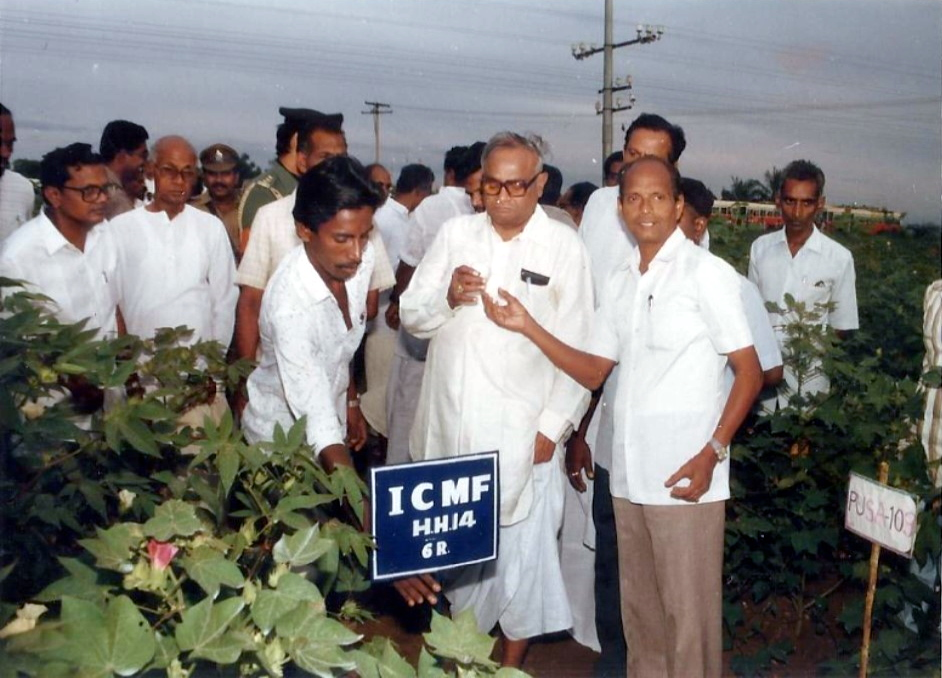
Kaderbad Ravindranath with Sri Pendekanti Venkatasubbaiah, Governor of Bihar during his visit to the ICMF Research Center

From 1985 to 1990, he deputised to the Indian Cotton Mills Federation – Cotton Development and Research Association (ICMF-CDRA) as a cotton research officer. He established a cotton research and development center at Nandyal and served as its head. He again served as the head of the research center from 1996 to 2000 (after retiring from ANGRAU)

He developed 500 germ-plasm lines for use in cotton breeding program. During this time he developed two cotton varieties (ICMF-4 and ICMF-6) and two cotton hybrids (ICMF-HH.8 and ICMF- HH.14).

He also developed a new technique of emasculation (copper straw method) to enhance the setting of crossed bolls up to 72% in Desi cotton (native breed).

In 1999, he visited European countries for one month to visit research stations and give lectures on the latest breeding techniques in cotton.

In 2001, he was sponsored by the Agricultural Research Management Project (ARMP-TA) by the Winrock International Institute for Agriculture Development and visited Bangladesh for two months to formulate a five-year technical program on cotton breeding to improve cotton yields.

== Bharathi Seeds ==
As of 2002, he was working as the executive director of research at Bharathi Seeds.

He developed an inter-se-hirsutum versatile superior cotton hybrid, Brahma which was the first hybrid cultivated by farmers from the private sector since 1997, with a claimed yield potential of 32 quintal per hectare.

He also developed a superior hirsutum cotton hybrid, "ATAL" with a claimed yield potential of 34 quintals per hectare.

He also developed a 'mixed pollen technique' to induce variability and genetic diversity in cotton using mixed pollen of desired types for developing genotypes with drought tolerance, big boll, fiber length with strength, and pest tolerance coupled with higher yield

== Family ==
He is married to Smt. Prasoona. They live at Nandyal. They have four children and six grandchildren.

== Social service ==
Since 1997, he has served as the chief advisor of Nandi Rythu Samakya, which provides advice and help to poor and marginalised farmers in sustainable cultivation practices.

He is the honorary president of Brahmin Seva Samakya, president of Matrubasha Parirakshana Samithi, president of the Nandyal Library Association, and president of the Agricultural University Retired Teachers Association, Nandyal.

He received "Gadicherla Foundation" award for social service.

== Awards ==
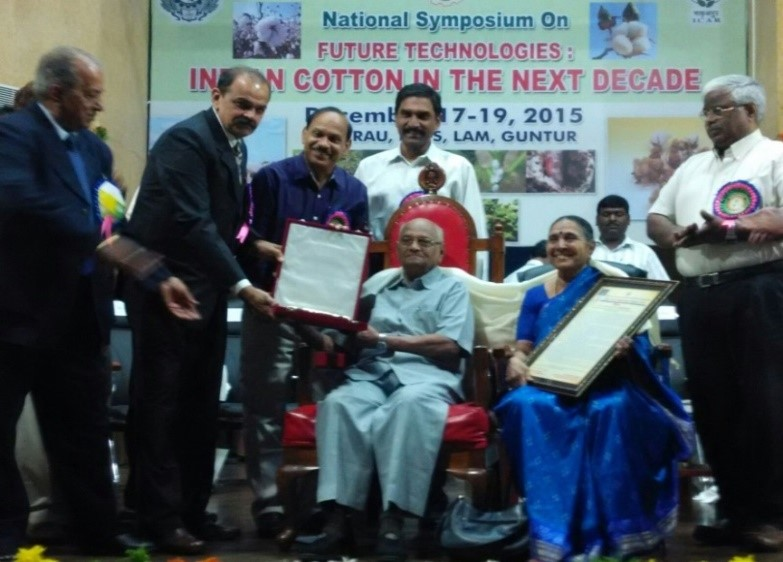
Kaderbad Ravindranath receiving Lifetime Achievement Award

1. Lifetime Achievement Award by Cotton Research and Development Association
2. Dr. I.V. Subba Rao Memorial Award
3. Acharya N.G. Ranga Agricultural University Best Scientist/Breeder award
4. Best Scientist Award from Kakani Venkataratnam Farm Foundation, Vijayawada
5. Sri Bharathiyudu Award
6. Gadicherla Foundation Award for Social Service
