= Masha Hamilton =

American novelist (born 1961)

- Hamilton in 2018
- Born: February 1, 1961 (age 65); Phoenix, Arizona, U.S.
- Occupations: Journalist and novelist
- Writing career
- Genre: Novels
- Website: mashahamilton.com

Masha Hamilton (born February 1, 1961) is an American journalist and the author of five novels as well as long-form narratives published in The Guardian, Atavist, Longreads, and elsewhere. She founded two world literacy projects, and worked as head of communications for the US Embassy in Afghanistan and the NGO Concern Worldwide US. A Brown University graduate, she also worked for five years for The Rockefeller Foundation.

== Career ==
Hamilton worked as a foreign correspondent for the Associated Press for five years in the Middle East, where she covered the First Intifada, the peace process, and the partial Israeli withdrawal from Lebanon. She spent five years in Moscow, where she was a Los Angeles Times correspondent and reported for NBC/Mutual Radio. She wrote about politics as well as average Russian's life during the collapse of the Soviet Union. She reported from Afghanistan in both 2004 and 2008.

In 2006, she traveled in Kenya to research the novel The Camel Bookmobile (2007), published by HarperCollins and in 11 language. She has also published the books Staircase of a Thousand Steps (2001), The Distance Between Us (2004), 31 Hours (2009), and What Changes Everything (2013). In 2009, 31 Hours was named by the Washington Post as one of the best books of the year.

== World literacy projects ==
Hamilton signing books in 2007.

She started two world literacy projects: the Camel Book Drive to help the camel-powered library in Northeast Kenya, begun in 2007, and the Afghan Women's Writing Project, to foster the voices of Afghan women, begun in 2009.

== Awards ==
Hamilton in 2023 with a farmer in Kenya.

Her article "I've Gone to Look for America", published in 2025 in The Atavist Magazine N°167 won Gold in the Lowell Thomas Travel Journalism Competition. It won in the category 116 for Special-Purpose Travel.

In 2010, she won the Women’s National Book Association WNBA Award. In 2013, she was received Meritorious and Superior Awards from the State Department after serving as Director of Communications and Public Diplomacy based in Kabul, Afghanistan, for a year and a half. In 2017, she was the John E Nance 2017 Writer-In-Residence at the Thurber House.

== Major works ==
- Postcard from Moscow, (newspaper column)
- Staircase of a Thousand Steps, (2001), Penguin Putnam/BlueHen Books
- The Distance Between Us, (2004) Unbridled Books
- The Camel Bookmobile, (2007) HarperCollins
- 31 Hours, (2009) Unbridled Books
- What Changes Everything, (2013) Unbridled Books
- I've Gone to Look for America, (2025) The Atavist Magazine
- The Children Who Loved a Killer, (2026) The Guardian
