= Iyyanki Venkata Ramanayya =

Indian librarian (1890–1979)

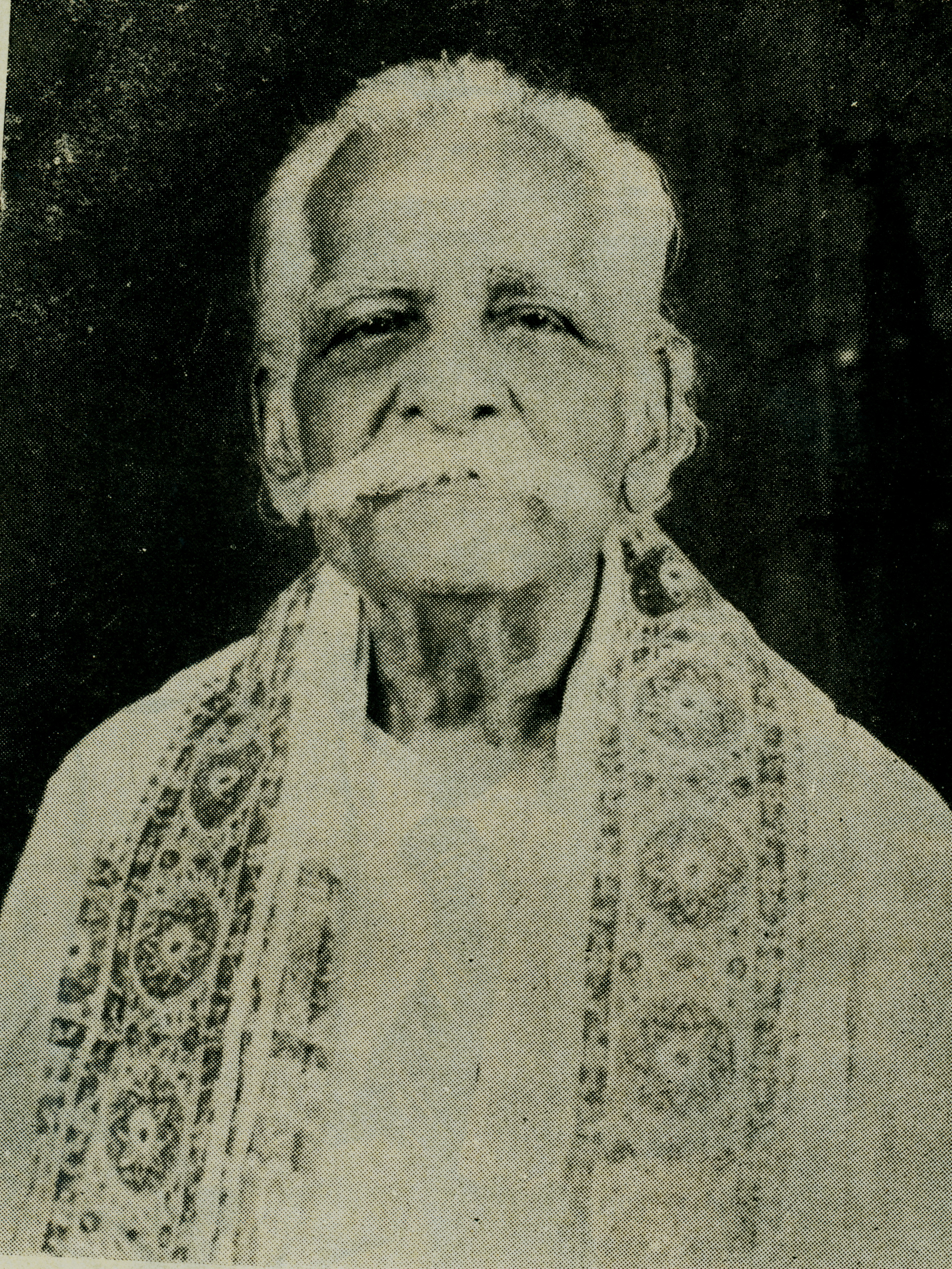
- Born: 1890; Konkuduru, East Godavari District, Andhra Pradesh
- Died: 1979 (aged 88–89)
- Occupation: Editor

Iyyanki Venkata Ramanayya or Ayyanki Venkata Ramanaiah (24 July 1890 – 1979) was an Indian public library activist.

== Accomplishments ==
Ramanayya never worked as a librarian in the technical sense but he founded thousands of public libraries throughout India, and South India in particular. P. Ramachandra Rao describes the Andhra Pradesh library movement;

In the general context of the national library movement, the Andhra library movement was conspicuous and significant, unique and described as “swayambhuv” (self-born) by Iyyanki Venkataramanayya. It was a social movement with popular participation, organised with democratic ideals, more for imbibing political consciousness and spreading literacy rather than for mere organisation of reading rooms and systematic libraries.

Ramanayya founded literary journals such as Andhra Bharati (ఆంధ్రభారతి) (1910), the first Telugu-language illustrated monthly, which informed people of Telugu related information. He also founded Grandhalaya Sarvaswam in Telugu in 1916, being the first professional journal on Library Science from Vijayawada, as well as the Indian Library Journal in 1924, which was the first professional journal on Library Science published in English from Vijayawada.

== Other works ==
Ramanayya organised hundreds of meetings and conferences at the national and state levels. People such as Rabindranath Tagore, P C Roy, and Chittaranjan Das were reception committee chairmen or presidents of different All India Public Library Conferences organised by him in various parts of India. He was the first secretary of the Andhra Pradesh Library Association along with N. Krishna Rad in 1914, as well as the All India Public Library Association which started in 1919.

== Legacy and awards ==
Ramanayya received the award of Granthalaya Pitamaha by the Maharajah of Baroda. The Indian government honoured him with the Padmashri award.

He was secretary for the Andhra Pradesh Library Association and organised an All India Library Meeting on 12 November 1912 in Madras. This meeting lead to the forming of the Indian Library Association.
