= Gadicherla Harisarvottama Rao =

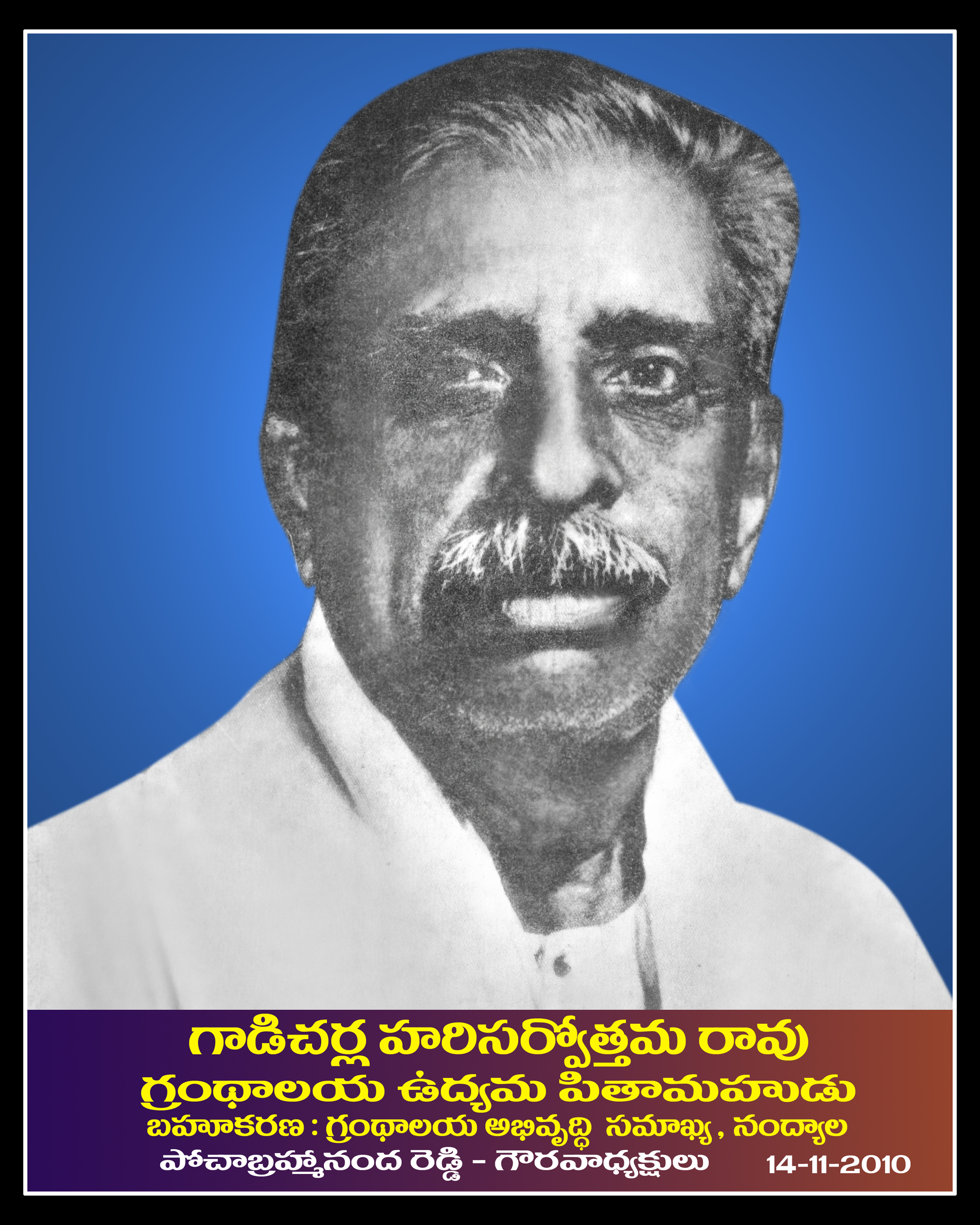
Gadicherla Harisarvottama Rao

Gadicherla Harisarvottama Rao (14 September 1883 – 29 February 1960) was a freedom fighter from Andhra during the Indian independence movement. He was inspired by the ideologies of Bal Gangadhar Tilak and Bipin Chandra Pal and joined the freedom movement at a very young age. He is the person who named the region as Rayalaseema when everybody taunted the region as Ceded because Nizam ceded the region to the British.

== Early life and education ==
Rao was born in Kurnool in 1883. After finishing school education in Kurnool, Nandyal and Gutti, Rao finished his M.A. from Madras Christian College in 1906. While at the Teachers Training College of Rajahmundry, he joined the Indian Independence movement.

=== Rajahmundry college incident ===
Rao and his fellow students attended a lecture by Bipin Chandra Pal at Rajahmundry. Inspired by Pal's speech, the students wore badges inscribed with 'Vande Mataram' to the college the next day. Mark Hunter, the college principal, objected and refused to admit the students until they removed the badges. The students refused. The principal dismissed Rao, who was the student leader, from the college. Hari Sarvothama Rao being debarred from employment as a teacher in any government or aided school or college. Later he was debarred from employment in any government office. This was a critical moment in Rao's life. The Rajahmundry college incident marked the beginning of Andhra student participation in the freedom struggle of the country.

American Rocket Scientist and the inventor of Optimum Rocket Nozzle (Bell nozzle) called Rao's Nozzle or Rao Nozzle), Dr. Gadicherla V.R. Rao (G.V.R.Rao) is related to Gadicherla Harisarvottama Rao.

== Role in the Freedom Movement ==
In 1908, Rao started a Telugu weekly newspaper publication called 'Swarajya' with the help of Bodi Narayana Rao. He wrote numerous essays in this newspaper criticizing the many unfair policies adopted by the British government. The British declared that his article 'Viparita Buddhi', which adopted a very severe tone in criticizing violence against the Indians (Sarvotham particularly wrote to the effect "The cruel English tiger has devoured two Indians!"), was an act of sedition and sentenced Rao to three years in prison.

In 1914, Gadicharla was made the secretary for the Andhra division of the Home Rule League formed by Tilak and Annie Besant. In this position, he played a pivotal role in inspiring the people by traveling widely to lecture. In 1923, he joined the Swarajya Party formed by Chittaranjan Das and Motilal Nehru. He was elected to the Madras Legislative Council as a candidate for the Andhra Congress from the Nandyala constituency.

== Fifth Session of the Andhra Mahasabha ==
The Fifth Session of the Andhra Mahasabha was held at Nellore on 1 June 1917 with Konda Venkatappaiah as president. The session proved to be stormy and brought to light the differences between Circars and Rayalaseema. From the beginning of the Andhra movement the people of Nellore and Rayalaseema were lukewarm in their support for a separate province. The people of Nellore because of their proximity to Madras city did not like to severe their connections with the metropolis which they felt would remain outside the territorial limits of Andhra. In Rayalaseema the leadership was in the hands of Tamils domiciled in the area like Kesava Pillai of Gooty (Anantapur district) and Ekambara Aiyer of Nandyal (Kurnool District). They did not like the creation of separate Andhra province as it would affect the domination of the Tamils in Telugu districts. The Telugu leaders of Rayalaseema like Harisarvothama Rao of Kurnool supported the creation of separate Andhra province.

In the Fifth Conference the opponents of separate Andhra were determined to defeat the resolution on the Andhra province. Of the 740 delegates more than 480 belonged to Nellore district. Fearing that the resolution would be defeated by the sheer numbers of one district Harisarvothama Rao proposed that voting should be district-wise, one vote being given to each district. The proposition was carried out as by the time of voting a large number of fresh delegates from the Circars joined the conference. The opponents of a separate province felt frustrated and met separately at the town hail and passed a resolution that a separate province would be desirable only if Madras city was included in it. B.N. Sarma and other leaders succeeded in removing the misunderstanding of the dissidents and they participated in the next day's session. The resolution requesting the Government to create a separate Andhra province was passed even though some prominent Nellor leaders like A.S, Krishna Rao voted against it. The amendment of the dissidents for the inclusion of Madras city in the Andhra province as its capital was rejected. But the Circar leaders realised that the support of Rayalaseema for a separate Andhra province could not be taken for granted, and that there was an urgent need to remove the fears and misunderstandings of the people of that area.

== Literary and social career ==
Gadicherla Harisarvottama Rao is considered one of the Trinity (along with Iyyanki Venkata Ramaiah and Paturi Nagabhushanam) of Library movement in Andhra Pradesh ("Granthalayodyama Trimurthulu"). He also served as its President

The Library Movement started by Gadicherla Harisarvottama Rao when he along with his friend and neighbour Kaderbad Narasinga Rao established the Edward Corporation Library (currently called Victoria Reading Room) in Nandyal. He also started and/or edited several publications and newspapers. Some of them are Andhra Kesari (Lion of Andhra), Navayugam (New Dawn), Andhra Patrika, Matru Seva (In service of Mother), Andhra Vartha (Andhra News), Panchayati Rajyam (local administration).

His works:

Abraham Lincoln charitra

Vismrita Rajakavi

SriRama Charitra

== Gadicherla Foundation ==
Gadicherla foundation is headquartered at Kurnool, Andhra Pradesh, India. Every year it presents "Gadicherla Foundation award" to people who made significant contributions in the areas championed by Sri Gadicherla Harisarvottama Rao. Some of the awardees are Prof. Katragadda Venkateswarlu of Andhra University (2012) and Sri Kaderbad Ravindranath for Social service (2014)
