= Nozzle extension =

Rocket component

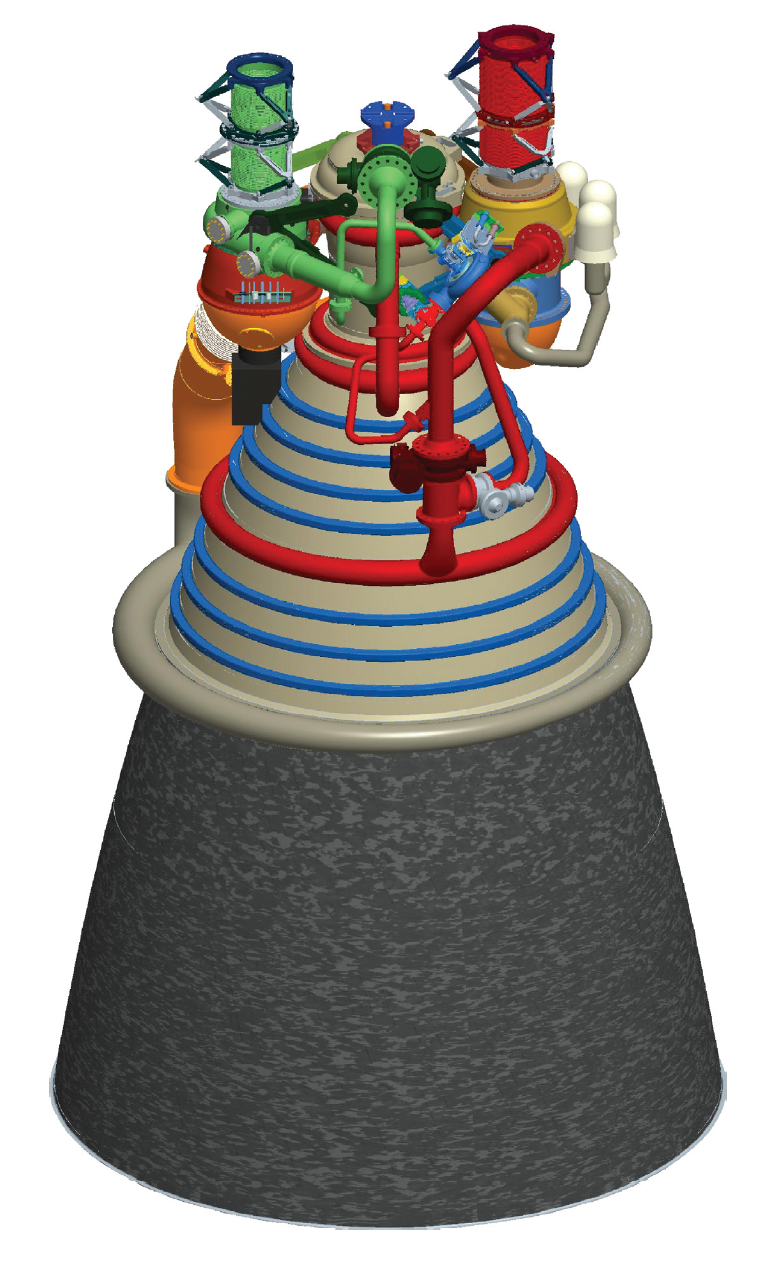
Artist rendition of liquid rocket engine J-2X with expanded nozzle extension.

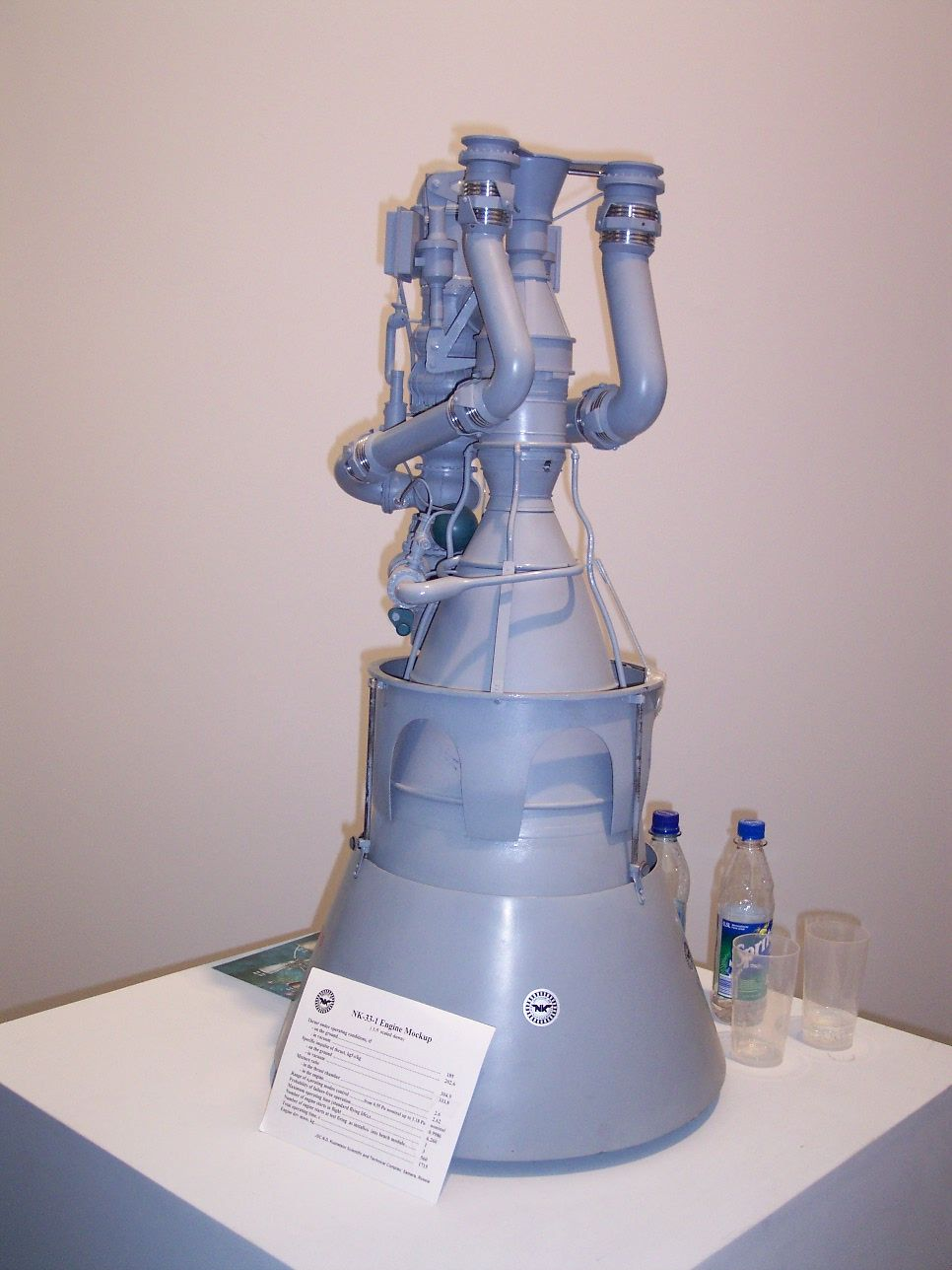
The mockup of NK-33-1 with a nozzle extension.

A nozzle extension is an extension of the nozzle of a reaction/rocket engine. The application of nozzle extensions improves the efficiency of rocket engines in vacuum by increasing the nozzle expansion ratio. As a rule, their modern design assumes use of carbon-carbon materials without regenerative cooling. Nozzle extensions can be both stationary, for high-altitude engines, or sliding, for engines designed to operate at a range of altitudes.

== Description ==
As of 2009, the search for various schemes to achieve higher area ratios for rocket nozzles remains an active field of research and patenting. Generally, modern application of these designs can be divided into "air-to-vacuum" engines, which start their work at sea level and finish it at vacuum conditions, and "vacuum" engines, which perform all their operations in a vacuum.

=== "Air-to-vacuum" engines ===
For first stage rocket engines, the engine works with nozzle extension in disposed position during the first minutes of flight and expands it at some predefined level of air pressure. This scheme assumes the outer skirt of the bell is extended while the engine is functioning and its installation to working position happens in the upper layers of the atmosphere. It excludes problems with flow separation at sea level and increases efficiency of the engine in vacuum. For example, application of nozzle extension for liquid rocket engine NK-33 improves the value of specific impulse up to 15-20 sec for near-space conditions. Therefore, this scheme adjusts the system to ambient conditions along the trajectory or, in other words, allows altitude compensation.

=== "Vacuum" engines ===
Rocket engines of upper stages perform all their operations in space and therefore in a vacuum. In order to achieve maximum efficiency for this class of engines they need high area ratios. This makes the nozzles a very sizable part of the engine, which must be completely enclosed below the nose cone of a rocket. The payload fairing and supporting constructions must endure all stresses and loads during launch and flight. Consequently, the use of an outer expandable skirt in this case allows the size of the upper stage and payload fairing to be minimized, which in turn decreases the total mass of the nose cone. For these reasons, nozzle extensions are used for rocket engines RL10 and RD-58.

== See also ==
- Rocket engine nozzle
- De Laval nozzle
- Stepped nozzle
- F-1
- NK-33
