= Solar thermal rocket =

Theoretical spacecraft propulsion system

A solar thermal rocket is a theoretical spacecraft propulsion system that would make use of solar power to directly heat reaction mass, and therefore would not require an electrical generator, like most other forms of solar-powered propulsion do. The rocket would only have to carry the means of capturing solar energy, such as concentrators and mirrors. The heated propellant would be fed through a conventional rocket nozzle to produce thrust. Its engine thrust would be directly related to the surface area of the solar collector and to the local intensity of the solar radiation.

In the shorter term, solar thermal propulsion has been proposed both for longer-life, lower-cost, more efficient use of the Sun and more-flexible cryogenic upper stage launch vehicles and for on-orbit propellant depots. Solar thermal propulsion is also a good candidate for use in reusable inter-orbital tugs, as it is a high-efficiency low-thrust system that can be refuelled with relative ease.

== Solar-thermal design concepts ==
There are two solar thermal propulsion concepts, differing primarily in the method by which they use solar power to heat up the propellant:

- Indirect solar heating involves pumping the propellant through passages in a heat exchanger that is heated by solar radiation. The windowless heat exchanger cavity concept is a design taking this radiation absorption approach.
- Direct solar heating involves exposing the propellant directly to solar radiation. The rotating bed concept is one of the preferred concepts for direct solar radiation absorption; it offers higher specific impulse than other direct heating designs by using a retained seed (tantalum carbide or hafnium carbide) approach. The propellant flows through the porous walls of a rotating cylinder, picking up heat from the seeds, which are retained on the walls by the rotation. The carbides are stable at high temperatures and have excellent heat transfer properties.

Due to limitations in the temperature that heat exchanger materials can withstand (approximately 2800 K), the indirect absorption designs cannot achieve specific impulses beyond 900 seconds (900 s·ɡ_{0} = 8.8 km/s) (or up to 1000 seconds, see below). The direct absorption designs allow higher propellant temperatures and therefore higher specific impulses, approaching 1200 seconds. Even the lower specific impulse represents a significant increase over that of conventional chemical rockets, however, an increase that can provide substantial payload gains (45 percent for a LEO-to-GEO mission) at the expense of increased trip time (14 days compared to 10 hours).

Small-scale hardware has been designed and fabricated for the Air Force Rocket Propulsion Laboratory (AFRPL) for ground test evaluation. Systems with 10 to 100 N of thrust have been investigated by SART.

Reusable Orbital Transfer Vehicles (OTV), sometimes called (inter-orbital) space tugs, propelled by solar thermal rockets have been proposed. The concentrators on solar thermal tugs are less susceptible to radiation in the Van Allen belts than the solar arrays of solar electric OTV.

An initial proof of concept was demonstrated in 2020 with helium at the Johns Hopkins University Applied Physics Laboratory solar simulator.

== Propellants ==
Most proposed designs for solar thermal rockets use hydrogen as their propellant due to its low molecular weight which gives excellent specific impulse of up to 1000 seconds (10 kN·s/kg) using heat exchangers made of rhenium.

Conventional thought has been that hydrogen—although it gives excellent specific impulse—is not space storable. Design work in the early 2010s has developed an approach to substantially reduce hydrogen boiloff, and to economically utilize the small remaining boiloff product for requisite in-space tasks, essentially achieving zero boil off (ZBO) from a practical point of view.

Other substances could also be used. Water gives quite poor performance of 190 seconds (1.9 kN·s/kg), but requires only simple equipment to purify and handle, and is space storable and this has very seriously been proposed for interplanetary use, using in-situ resources.

Ammonia has been proposed as a propellant. It offers higher specific impulse than water, but is easily storable, with a freezing point of −77 °C and a boiling point of −33.34 °C.

A solar-thermal propulsion architecture outperforms architectures involving electrolysis and liquification of hydrogen from water by more than an order of magnitude, since electrolysis requires heavy power generators, whereas distillation only requires a simple and compact heat source (either nuclear or solar); so the propellant production rate is correspondingly far higher for any given initial mass of equipment. However its use does rely on having clear ideas of the location of water ice in the Solar System, particularly on lunar and asteroidal bodies, and such information is not known, other than that the bodies within the asteroid belt and further from the Sun are expected to be rich in water ice.

== Solar-thermal for ground launch ==
Solar thermal rockets have been proposed as a system for launching a small personal spacecraft into orbit. The design is based on a high altitude airship which uses its envelope to focus sunlight onto a tube. The propellant, which would likely be ammonia, is then fed through to produce thrust. Possible design flaws include whether the engine could produce enough thrust to overcome drag, and whether the skin of the airship wouldn't fail at hypersonic velocities. This has many similarities to the orbital airship proposed by JP Aerospace.

== Proposed solar-thermal space systems ==
As of 2010, two proposals for utilizing solar-thermal propulsion on in-space post-launch spacecraft systems had been made.

A concept to provide low Earth orbit (LEO) propellant depots that could be used as way-stations for other spacecraft to stop and refuel on the way to beyond-LEO missions has proposed that waste gaseous hydrogen—an inevitable byproduct of long-term liquid hydrogen storage in the radiative heat environment of space—would be usable as a monopropellant in a solar-thermal propulsion system. The waste hydrogen would be productively utilized for both orbital stationkeeping and attitude control, as well as providing limited propellant and thrust to use for orbital maneuvers to better rendezvous with other spacecraft that would be inbound to receive fuel from the depot.

Solar-thermal monoprop hydrogen thrusters are also integral to the design of the next-generation cryogenic upper stage rocket proposed by U.S. company United Launch Alliance (ULA). The Advanced Common Evolved Stage (ACES) was intended as a lower-cost, more-capable and more-flexible upper stage that would supplement, and perhaps replace, the existing ULA Centaur and ULA Delta Cryogenic Second Stage (DCSS) upper stage vehicles. The ACES Integrated Vehicle Fluids option eliminates all hydrazine monopropellant and all helium pressurant from the space vehicle—normally used for attitude control and station keeping—and depends instead on solar-thermal monoprop thrusters using waste hydrogen.

The viability of various trips using Solar Thermal propulsion was investigated by Gordon Woodcock and Dave Byers in 2003.

A subsequent proposal in the 2010s was the Solar Moth spacecraft that would use lightweight mirrors to focus solar radiation on a solar thermal engine.

== See also ==
- Solar electric propulsion
- Nuclear thermal rocket
