= Stepped nozzle =

Type of rocket nozzle

A stepped nozzle (or dual-bell nozzle) is a de Laval rocket nozzle which has altitude compensating properties.

The characteristic of this kind of nozzle is that part of the way along the inside of the nozzle there is a straightening of the curve of the nozzle contour, followed by a sharp step outwards.

At low altitude, this causes the jet to separate at the step and ambient pressure maintains the jet at this place, avoiding jet instabilities and avoiding massive overexpansion.

As the altitude rises, the jet becomes progressively under-expanded and grows until it fills the nozzle, at which point the gas provides more pressure against the rest of the nozzle and thrust and specific impulse increases.

== See also ==
- Nozzle extension
- Bell nozzle
