= Plug nozzle =

Type of nozzle

The plug nozzle is a type of nozzle which includes a centerbody or plug around which the working fluid flows. Plug nozzles have applications in aircraft, rockets, and numerous other fluid flow devices.

== Hoses ==
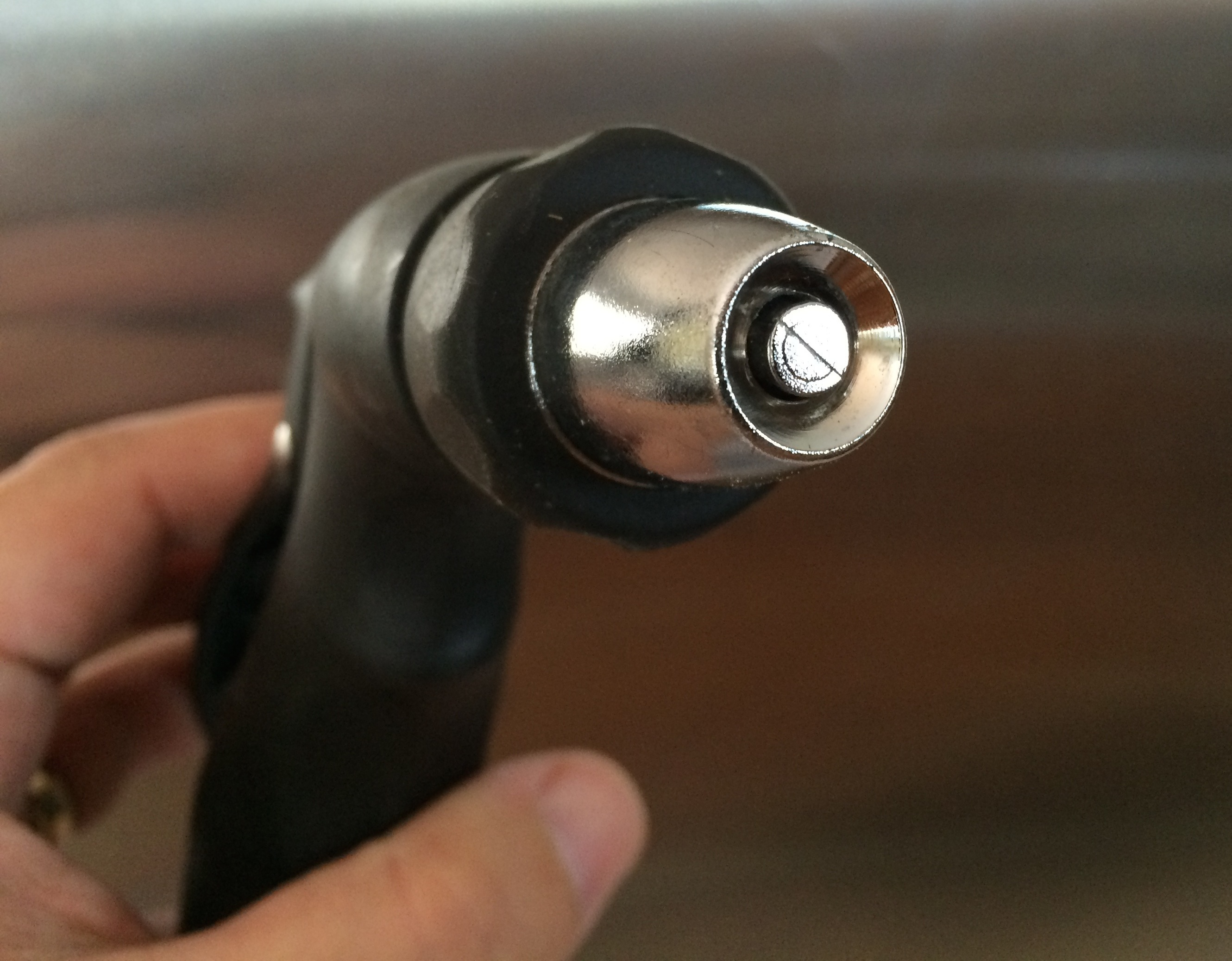
Typical plug-nozzle garden sprayer with a trigger-pull lever (at the back) to control the position of the plug and valve.

Common garden hose trigger nozzles are a simple example of the plug nozzle and its method of operation. In this example the nozzle consists of a conical or bell shaped opening with a plug on a movable rod positioned in front of the nozzle. The plug looks similar to a poppet valve. The stem of the valve runs back through the body of the nozzle body to a "trigger", normally a long lever running down the back of the nozzle assembly. A spring keeps the valve pressed against the opening under normal use, thereby providing a failsafe cut-off that stops the flow of water when the nozzle is dropped.

When water is supplied to the hose, it flows through the nozzle body to the opening, where it would normally flow straight forward in a stream. Just after leaving the opening it encounters the plug, which deflects the water sideways through an angle. After travelling a short distance the water encounters the outside of the nozzle opening, which deflects it forward again. This two-step process causes the water to be ejected in a ring-shaped pattern, which causes less water to strike any one location, and thereby reduces erosion while also making it easier to water larger areas.

The shaping of the plug and the nozzle opening allows the angle of the ring to be adjusted. Normally this is shaped so that when the plug is pulled back toward the opening it both partially cuts off the water flow, as well as causing it to spread out to the widest possible angle. This can be used for "misting" plants. When the trigger is pushed down further, the plug moves away from the opening, causing less blockage and disruption of the flow, ultimately allowing the water to form back into a stream.

== In rockets ==
Plug nozzles belong to a class of altitude compensating nozzles, much like the aerospike, which, unlike traditional designs, maintains its efficiency at a wide range of altitudes.

Similar to the garden hose example, plug nozzles use a shaped rocket nozzle with a poppet-shaped plug to allow the pattern of the rocket exhaust to be changed. This is used to adjust for changes in altitude; at lower altitudes the plug is pulled back to cause the exhaust to spread out, while at higher altitudes the lower air pressure will cause this to happen naturally. An alternative construction for the same basic concept is to use two nozzles, one inside the other, and adjust the distance between them. This pattern has the advantage of better control over the exhaust and simpler cooling arrangements.

Confusingly, the term "plug nozzle" may also be used to refer to an entirely different class of engine nozzles, the aerospikes. In theory the aerospike should look roughly like a lance, with a wide base and long tapering forebody. However, the "spike" portion can be cut off with only minor effects on performance, leaving just the base section. This looks very similar to a common drain plug or bung, and leads to widespread use of the term "plug nozzle" for this design as well.

== In aircraft and missiles ==
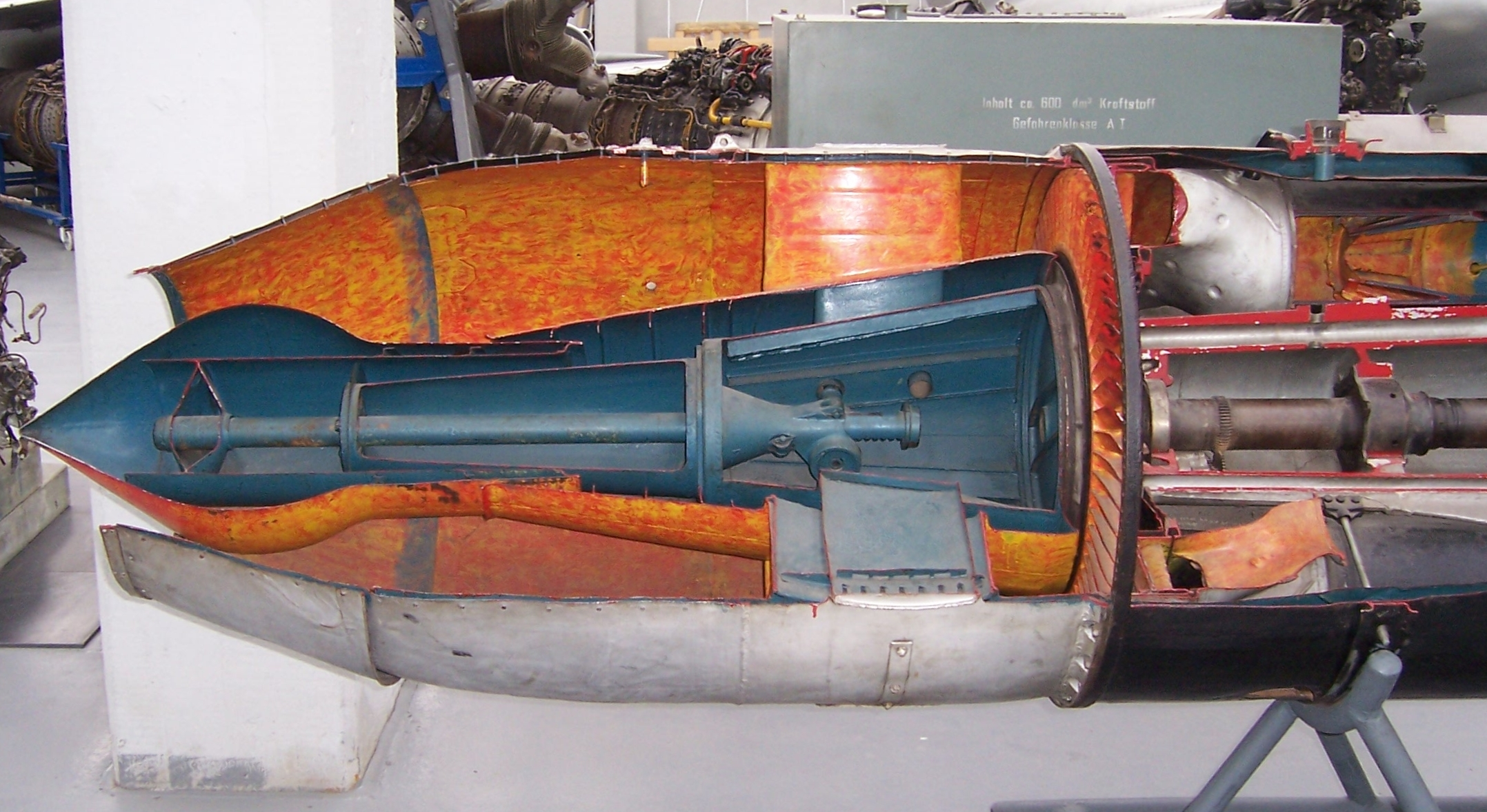
Sectioned Jumo 004 exhaust nozzle, showing the Zwiebel restrictive body

The jet-engine plug nozzle has its origins in rocketry but has also been studied over the years, but not used, for supersonic cruise aircraft such as the Boeing SST, the proposed General Electric Variable Cycle Engine, with its acoustic plug nozzle, and Concorde. However, it was used for the AGM-28 Hound Dog missile and the Tu-144 airliner. The plug / "external-expanding" nozzle has a central plug and a freely-expanding supersonic jet rather than a diverging cone surface to contain the internal supersonic expansion as in a delaval convergent-divergent nozzle (con-di) nozzle. The Pratt & Whitney J52 aircraft engine used in the supersonic AGM-28 Hound Dog missile used a plug nozzle which performed better over the missile's flight envelope than either a convergent or a con-di nozzle. A translating center-body was used on the non-afterburning Kolesov RD-36-51A engine used for the Tupolev Tu-144D supersonic airliner. The center-body was perforated and compressed air forced into the exhaust jet through the perforations to attenuate the noise. Weight and cooling are typical concerns with aircraft plug nozzles. A plug nozzle design evaluated at the National Gas Turbine Establishment was rejected for the Concorde engine due to the weight penalty from the required variable features and concerns about adequate plug cooling during reheat operation. Plug nozzle model tests have shown reduced noise levels compared to traditional con-di nozzles.

Propelling nozzles for subsonic aircraft have used a center-body/bullet/cone to give the nozzle exit area required to set an axial compressor running-line correctly on its map. The first operational German turbojet engines with axial compressors, the Jumo 004 and BMW 003, needed a different exhaust nozzle areas for running properly at each of the operating regimes: start/idle, climb, high speed, high altitude. A nozzle with a fore/aft-translating "bullet" restrictive body in the center was chosen for each design. It provided area control with relatively simple actuation and matched the annular shape of the turbine exhaust.

== See also ==
- Bell nozzle
- Aerospike engine
- Expanding nozzle
