= Thrust coefficient =

Characteristic of rocket engine nozzles

Thrust coefficient or $c_F$ (sometimes $c_\tau$) is a dimensionless number that measures the performance of a nozzle, most commonly in a rocket engine, independent of combustion performance. It is often used to compare the performance of different nozzle geometries. After combining it with characteristic velocity $c^{*}$, then an effective exhaust velocity $c$ and a specific impulse $I_{sp}$ can be found to characterize the overall efficiency of a rocket engine design.

The thrust coefficient characterizes the supersonic flow in the expansion section downstream of the nozzle throat, in contrast to characteristic velocity which characterizes the subsonic flow in the combustion chamber and contraction section upstream of the throat.

== Physics and context ==
Thrust coefficients characterize how well a nozzle will boost the efficiency of a rocket engine by expanding the exhaust gas and dropping its pressure before it meets ambient conditions. A $c_F$ of 1 corresponds to zero ambient pressure and no expansion at all; i.e. the throat exhausts straight to vacuum without any diverging nozzle at all. The effective exhaust velocity would then be equal to the characteristic velocity provided by the combustion chamber. Typical thrust coefficients seen in aerospace industry rocket engines vary between about 1.3 and 2. Virtually all large engines since the 1960s have used a bell nozzle geometry which optimizes for the highest thrust coefficient; this was first derived by Gadicharla V.R. Rao. using the method of characteristics.

=== Industry examples ===
Rocket engine	Thrust coefficient at sea level	Thrust coefficient in vacuum	Citation
Rocketdyne F-1	1.59	1.82	
Rocketdyne RL10A-1		2.05	
Rocketdyne RS-25 / SSME	1.53	1.91	
Energomash RD-120		1.95	
Energomash RD-170	1.71	1.86	
Energomash RD-253	1.65	1.83	

== Formulas ==
$c_F = \frac{c}{c^{*}} = \frac{I_{sp} g_0}{c^{*}} = \frac{F}{p_{c} A_{t}}$

- $c$ is the effective exhaust velocity.
- $c^{*}$ is the characteristic velocity of the combustion.
- $I_{sp}$ is specific impulse.
- $g_0$ is standard gravity.
- $F$ is total thrust of the engine.
- $p_c$ is chamber pressure.
- $A_t$ is the area of the nozzle throat.

=== Ideal nozzles ===
An ideal nozzle has parallel, uniform exit flow; this is achieved when the pressure at the exit plane equals the ambient pressure. In vacuum conditions this means an ideal nozzle is infinitely long. The area ratio can be derived from isentropic flow, also given here:

$\frac{A_e}{A_t} = \left( \frac{\gamma-1}{2}\right)^{1/2} \left(\frac{2}{\gamma+1}\right)^{\frac{\gamma+1}{2(\gamma-1)}} \left( \frac{p_a}{p_c}\right)^{-\frac{1}{\gamma}} \left[1 - \left(\frac{p_a}{p_c}\right)^\frac{\gamma-1}{\gamma} \right]^{-\frac{1}{2}}$

- $A_e$ is the area of the nozzle exit plane.
- $\gamma$ is the ratio of specific heats of the exhaust gas.
- $p_a$ is the ambient pressure of the surrounding atmosphere/vacuum.

The ideal thrust coefficient is then

$c_{F|ideal} = \sqrt{ \frac{2 \gamma^{2}}{\gamma-1} \left(\frac{2}{\gamma+1}\right)^{\frac{\gamma+1}{\gamma-1}} \left[1-\left(\frac{p_e}{p_c}\right)^{\frac{{\gamma}-1}{\gamma}}\right] } + \frac{A_e}{A_t} \left(\frac{p_e-p_a}{p_c}\right)$

- $p_e$ is the pressure of the exhaust gas at the exit plane. In the ideal case in vacuum ($p_e = p_a = 0$), the expression reduces to

$c_{F|ideal} = \sqrt{ \frac{2 \gamma^{2}}{\gamma-1} \left(\frac{2}{\gamma+1}\right)^{\frac{\gamma+1}{\gamma-1}}}$.

For a diatomic gas ($\gamma = 1.4$), $c_{F|ideal} \approx 1.81$. The absolute theoretical limit, corresponding to $\gamma \rightarrow 1$, is $\sqrt{2e} \approx 2.33$

=== Corrections ===
Various inefficiencies in a real nozzle design will reduce the overall thrust coefficient. Three major effects contribute as follows

$c_F = {\eta_d} {\eta}_t \left[ {\eta}_f c_{F|ideal} + (1-{\eta_f}) {\frac{p_{e} A_e}{p_c A_t}} \right] - \frac{p_{a} A_e}{{p_c} A_t}$

- $\eta_d$ is the divergence loss efficiency (typically the most dominant inefficiency).
- $\eta_t$ is the two-phase flow loss efficiency.
- $\eta_f$ is the skin friction loss efficiency (typically about 0.99).

==== Conical nozzles ====
${\eta}_d = \left(\frac{1+cos{\alpha}}{2}\right)$

- $\alpha$ is the half-angle of the conical nozzle.

==== Annular nozzles ====
These nozzles are typically found in aerospike engines or in jet engines.

${\eta}_d = \frac{ \frac{1}{2} \left(\sin{\alpha}+\sin{\beta}\right)^{2} } {\left(\alpha + \beta \right) \sin{\beta} + \cos{\beta} - \cos{\alpha}}$

- $\alpha$ is the half-angle of the outer wall of the nozzle (rad).
- $\beta$ is the (positive) half-angle of the inner wall of the plug inside the nozzle (rad).

==== Generalized contour nozzles ====
There are no simple relations for divergence inefficiency for a more general nozzle contour, such as a bell nozzle. Instead the thrust coefficient must be integrated directly, assuming pressure variation across the nozzle exit plane has already been found:

${c_F} = \int_{0}^{R_e} \left(\frac{p}{p_c A_t} + \frac{\rho V^2 \cos{\theta}}{p_c {A_t}} \right) 2 \pi r dr - \frac{p_a}{p_c} \frac{A_e}{A_t}$

- $R_e$ is the inner radius of the nozzle at the exit plane. In an annular nozzle it is the distance between the outer wall and the plug at the exit plane.
- $r$ is the distance from the central axis to the point of interest. The relationship assumes radial symmetry of all properties.
- $p$ is the pressure of the exhaust gas at the exit plane at a given $r$.
- $\rho$ is the density of the exhaust gas at the exit plane at a given $r$.
- $V$ is the speed of the exhaust gas at the exit plane at a given $r$.
- $\theta$ is the angular direction of the exhaust gas velocity at the exit plane at a given $r$.
