= Twister supersonic separator =

The Twister supersonic separator is a compact tubular device which is used for removing water and/or hydrocarbon dewpointing of natural gas. The principle of operation is similar to the near isentropic Brayton cycle of a turboexpander. The gas is accelerated to supersonic velocities within the tube using a De Laval nozzle and inlet guide vanes spin the gas around an inner-body which creates the "ballerina effect" and centrifugally separates the water and liquids in the tube. Hydrates do not form in the Twister tube due to the very short residence time of the gas in the tube (around 2 milliseconds). A secondary separator treats the liquids and slip gas and also acts as a hydrate control vessel. Twister is able to dehydrate to typical pipeline dewpoint specifications and relies on a pressure drop from the inlet of about 25%, dependent on the performance required. The fundamental mathematics behind supersonic separation can be found in the Society of Petroleum Engineers paper (number 100442) entitled "Selective Removal of Water from Supercritical Natural Gas". The closed Twister system enables gas treatment subsea.

It is a product of Twister BV, a Dutch firm acquired by WAEP Coöperatief U.A.
