= Bell nozzle =

Rocket engine nozzle shape

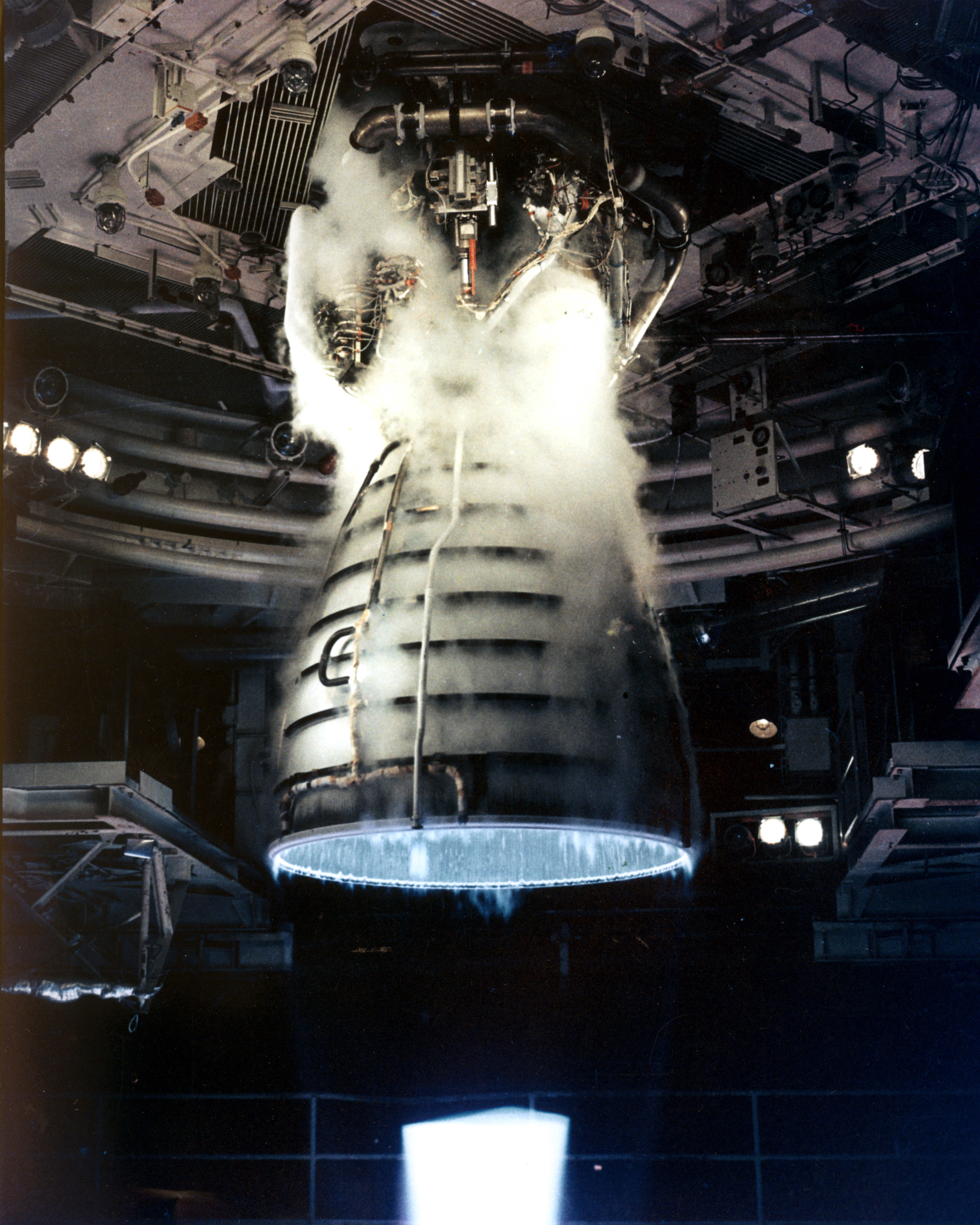
Test firing of Space Shuttle main engine (whose engine nozzle is very close in shape to optimal)

The bell-shaped or contour nozzle is probably the most commonly used shaped rocket engine nozzle. It has a high angle expansion section (20 to 50 degrees) right behind the nozzle throat; this is followed by a gradual reversal of nozzle contour slope so that at the nozzle exit the divergence angle is small, usually less than a 10 degree half angle.

An ideal nozzle would direct all of the gases generated in the combustion chamber straight out the nozzle. That would mean the momentum of the gases would be axial, imparting the maximum thrust to the rocket. In fact, there are some non-axial components to the momentum. In terms of a momentum vector, there is an angle between the axis of the rocket engine and the gas flow. As a result, the thrust is lowered by varying amounts.

The bell or contour shape is designed to impart a large angle expansion for the gases right after the throat. The nozzle is then curved back in to give a nearly straight flow of gas out the nozzle opening. The contour used is rather complex. The large expansion section near the throat causes expansion shock waves. The reversal of the slope to bring the exit to near zero degrees causes compression shock waves. A properly designed nozzle will have these two sets of shock waves coincide and cancel each other out. In this way, the bell is a compromise between the two extremes of the conical nozzle since it minimizes weight while maximizing performance.

The most important design issue is to contour the nozzle to avoid oblique shocks and maximize the thrust coefficient (a measure of performance).

In his classic textbook, George P. Sutton credits Dr. G. V. R. Rao with working out the mathematics of the optimal bell nozzle design in 1955, while working at Rocketdyne.

== See also ==
- Aerospike engine
- Expanding nozzle
- Plug nozzle
