= RLV =

RLV9 can refer to:

- Reusable launch vehicle, the general concept of Reusable launch vehicles (to space)
  - Reusable Launch Vehicle program (NASA), a cancelled NASA program that included the X33 experimental craft
  - RLV-TD, India's Reusable Launch Vehicle - Technology Demonstrator project
- Relevium Technologies Inc, Stock Symbol: RLV
- Restrained Life Viewer for Second Life
- Defence of the Reich, the World War II German Reichsluftverteidigung (RLV) defensive aerial campaign
- RLV College of Music and Fine Arts, Kerala, India
