= Aerospace Team Graz =

Austrian student rocketry team

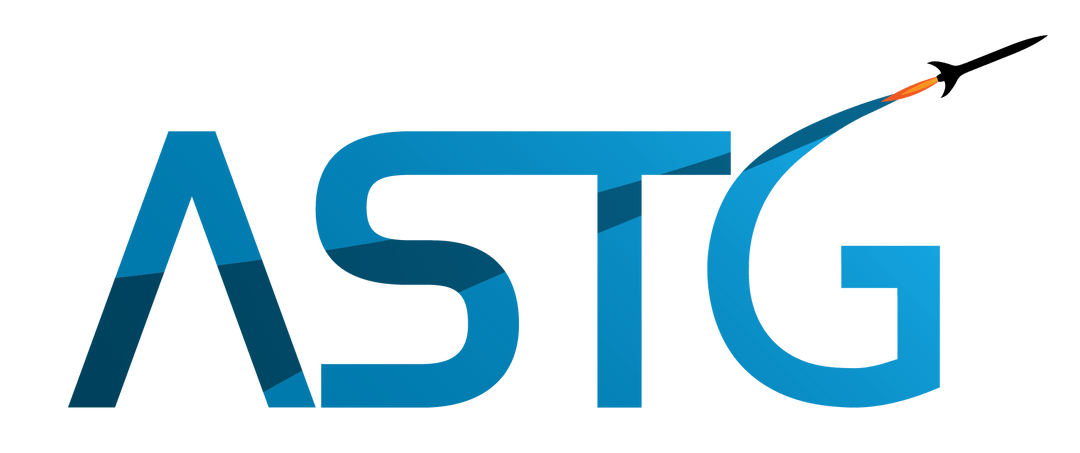
- Formation: 2019
- Location: Graz (Austria)
- Fields: Rocketry

The Aerospace Team Graz (ASTG) is an interdisciplinary student club based in Graz, Austria, comprising members from various local universities, such as the Graz University of Technology. Established to bridge the gap between academic theory and practical aerospace engineering, the organization specializes in the end-to-end development of high-power sounding rockets and experimental payloads. The team serves as a platform where students design, manufacture and test flight hardware to compete in international competitions, such as the European Rocketry Challenge (EuRoC).

The team is a member in the German National Student Space Flight Society (Bundesverband studentischer Raumfahrt e.V.), a national organisation of student space clubs, similar to SEDS.

== Projects ==
=== Sounding Rockets (EuRoC) ===
Year	Rocket	Propulsion	Target	Apogee	Awards
2026	Harpia	Liquid	9,000 m	-	-
2025	Ispida	Hybrid	9,000 m	9,366 m	EuRoC Award, H9 Flight Award
2024	Alcedo	Hybrid	9,000 m	6,391 m	Design Award, Technical Award, H9 Flight Award
2023	Halcyon	Hybrid	3,000 m	3,471 m	EuRoC Award, H3 Flight Award
2022	Aves II	Solid	3,000 m	2,530 m	New Space Award, Team Award
2021	Aves	Solid	3,000 m	> 1500 m*	Technical Award

* No flight data was retrieved. Post-flight simulations indicate an altitude exceeding 1500 m.

=== REXUS/BEXUS Projects ===
Year	Project	Mission Concept
2024–2026	APEX	Auroral Polarization EXplorer: measure the polarization of the aurora borealis.

== Weblinks ==
Homepage of the ASTG

== See Also ==
- European Rocketry Challenge
- Scientific Workgroup for Rocketry and Spaceflight – Scientific workgroup at Technical University of Munich
- Delft Aerospace Rocket Engineering – Dutch student rocketry society
- Copenhagen Suborbitals – Amateur crowdfunded human space programme
