= Charles Bartley =

American scientist

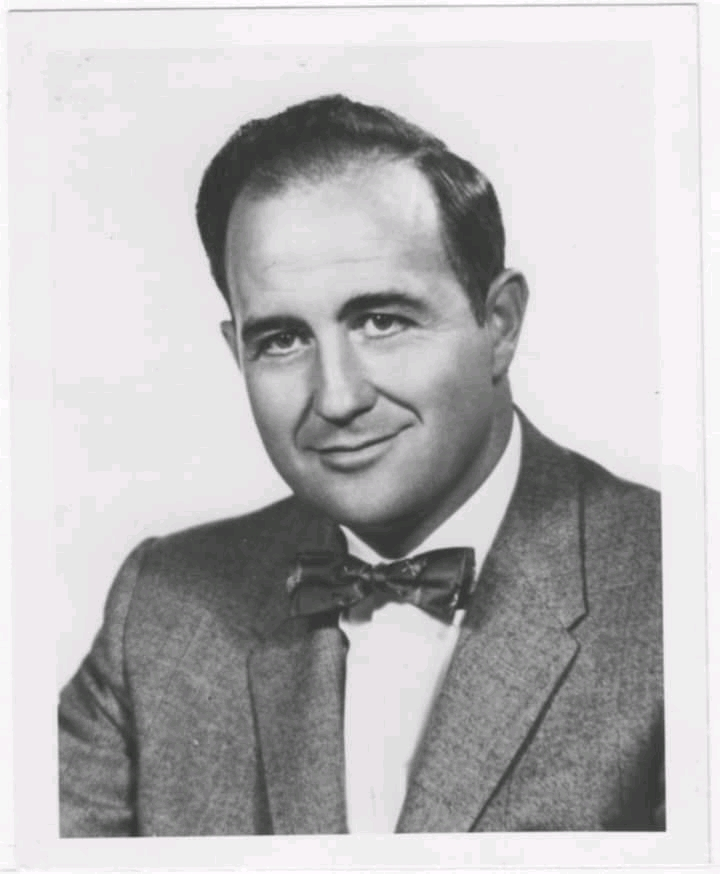
- Charles Bartley, inventor of polysulfide rocket propellant
- Born: Charles E. Bartley; 1921
- Died: 1996 (aged 74–75)
- Known for: Invention of rubber-based (polysulfide) solid-propellant rocket fuel Founder of Grand Central Rocket Company
- Awards: American Rocket Society Award (1953)
- Scientific career
- Fields: Rocketry, Aerospace engineering, Chemistry
- Workplaces: Jet Propulsion Laboratory (JPL); Grand Central Rocket Company; Rocket Power; Universal Propulsion Co.

Charles E. Bartley (21 October 1921 – 17 July 1996) was an American scientist, known for developing the first elastomeric solid rocket propellant formula, (Note: US patent 2997376, Bartley, Charles E., "Solid composite propellant containing polysulfide rubber fuel binder", issued 1961-08-22) at the Jet Propulsion Laboratory (JPL), now part of NASA, in Pasadena, California, in the late 1940s.

Bartley founded Grand Central Rocket Company in Redlands, California in 1952. Six years later, his company provided the fuel for the third stage of Explorer 1, America's first satellite. Bartley eventually sold Grand Central and founded two other solid propellant rocket companies specializing in weather rockets and ejection seats for jets: Rocket Power, which he formed in Mesa, Arizona, in 1959, and Universal Propulsion Co., which he established in Phœnix in 1963. He was elected to the American Rocket Society (now the American Institute of Aeronautics and Astronautics) in 1951. In 1953, he was given a society award for outstanding contributions (American Rocket Society Award).

John Bluth interviewed Bartley over the course of two days in 1994 for the JPL archives.
