= Rocketdyne XRS-2200 =

Aerospike rocket engine by Rocketdyne

XRS-2200
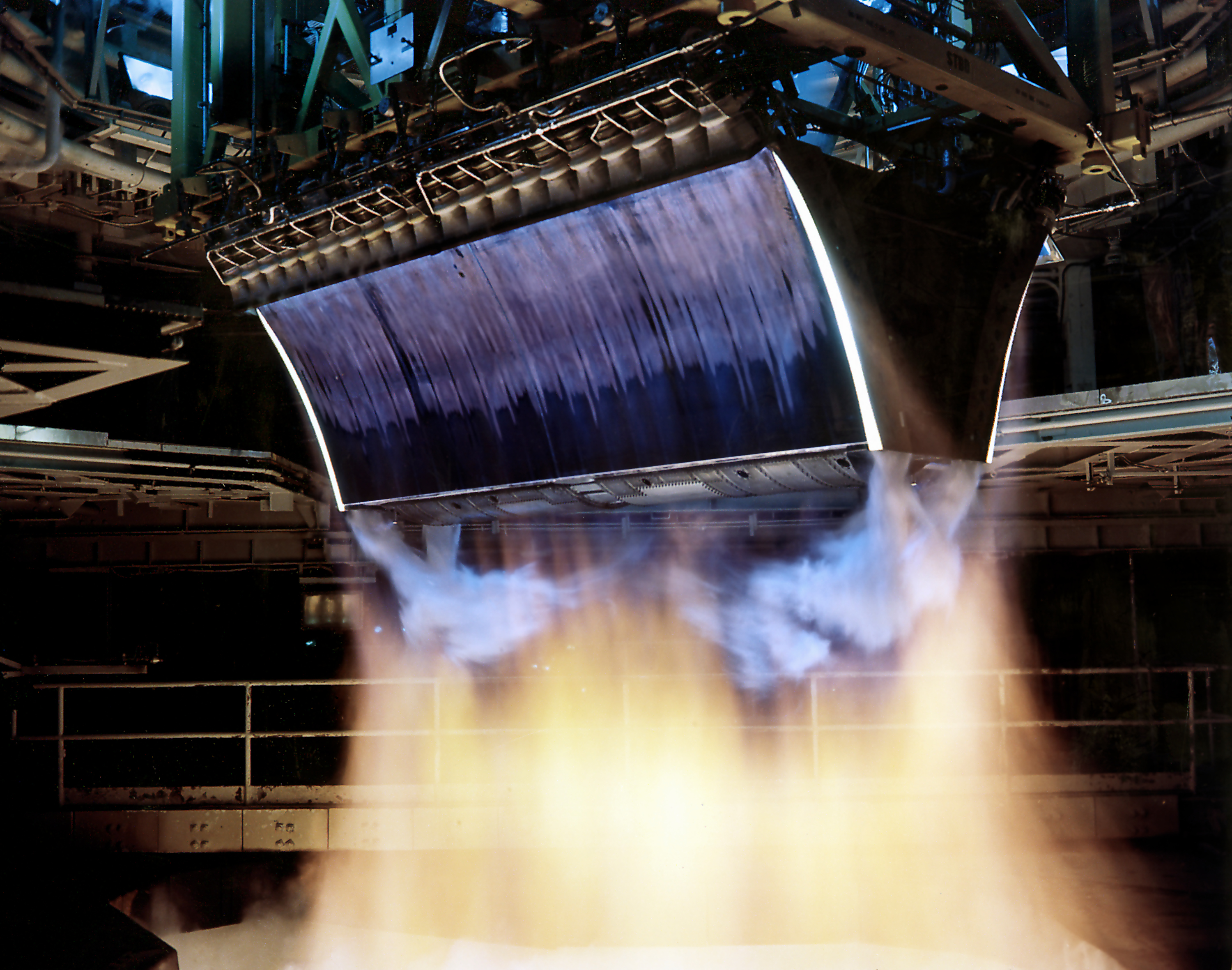
- Rocketdyne XRS-2200 hotfire test
- Country of origin: United States
- Date: 1999
- Designer: Rocketdyne
- Manufacturer: Rocketdyne
- Application: X-33
- Predecessor: J-2
- Status: Experimental

Liquid-fuel engine
- Propellant: LOX / LH2
- Cycle: Gas Generator

Configuration
- Nozzle ratio: 58:1

Performance
- Thrust, vacuum: 1,184 kN (266,000 lb_{f})
- Thrust, sea-level: 909 kN (204,000 lb_{f})
- Chamber pressure: 58 bar (840 psi)
- Specific impulse, vacuum: 439 seconds (4.31 km/s)
- Specific impulse, sea-level: 339 seconds (3.32 km/s)

Dimensions
- Length: 2.01 m (6 ft 7 in)

The Rocketdyne XRS-2200 was an experimental linear aerospike engine developed in the mid-1990s for the Lockheed Martin X-33 program. The XRS-2200 engine's powerpack (Turbomachinery and Gas Generator) was derived from the Rocketdyne J-2 engine, the upper stage engine of the Saturn V moon rocket developed under the Apollo Program in the 1960's. The XRS-2200 used the J-2's combustion cycle and propellant choice.

Rocketdyne intended to develop the subscale XRS-2200 into the RS-2200 for use on the VentureStar. While the X-33 program was cancelled, two XRS-2200 engines were produced and tested.
