= Linear Aerospike SR-71 Experiment =

Linear Aerospike SR-71 Experiment 1997/8 NASA for X-33

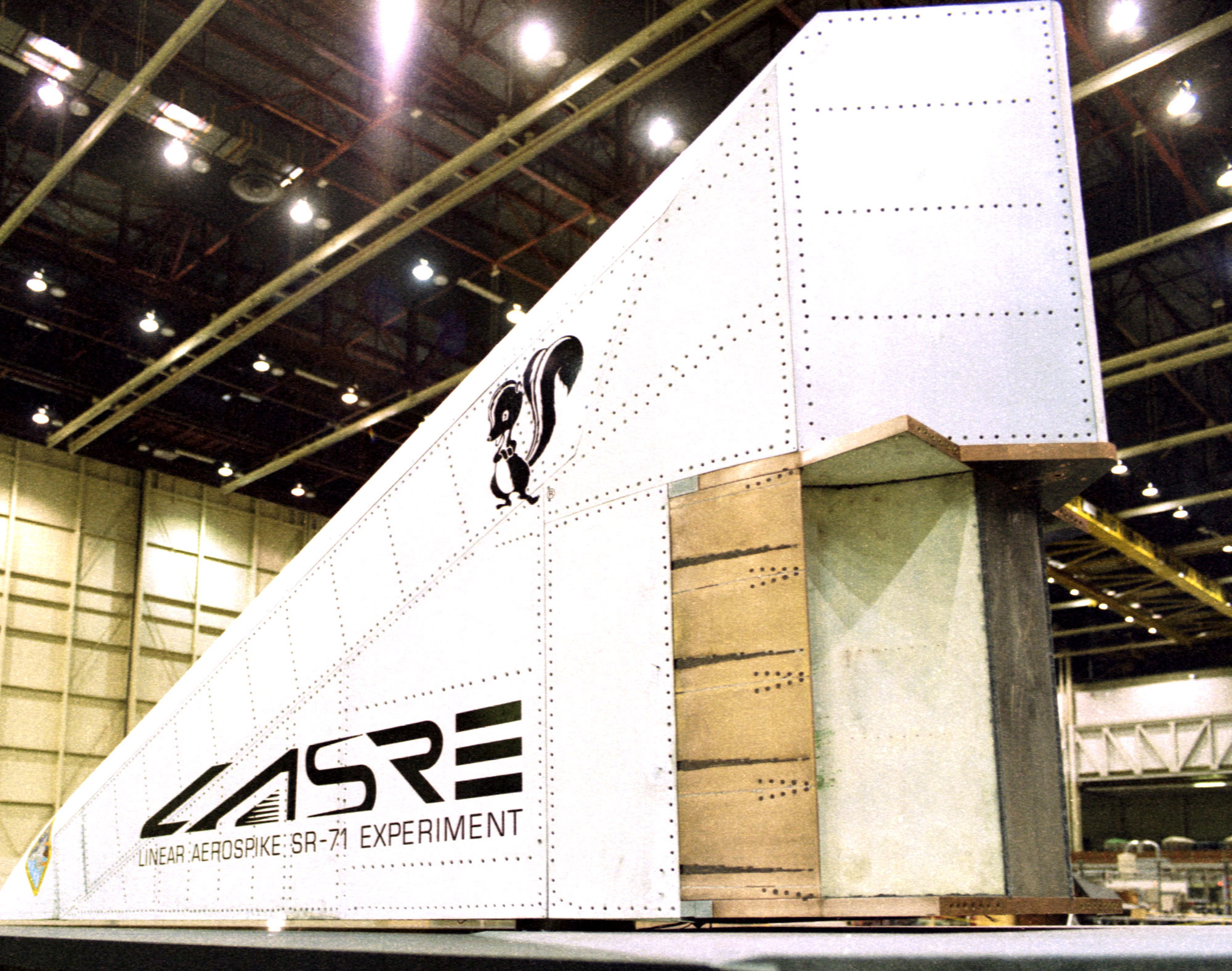
Closeup of rear of LASRE pod

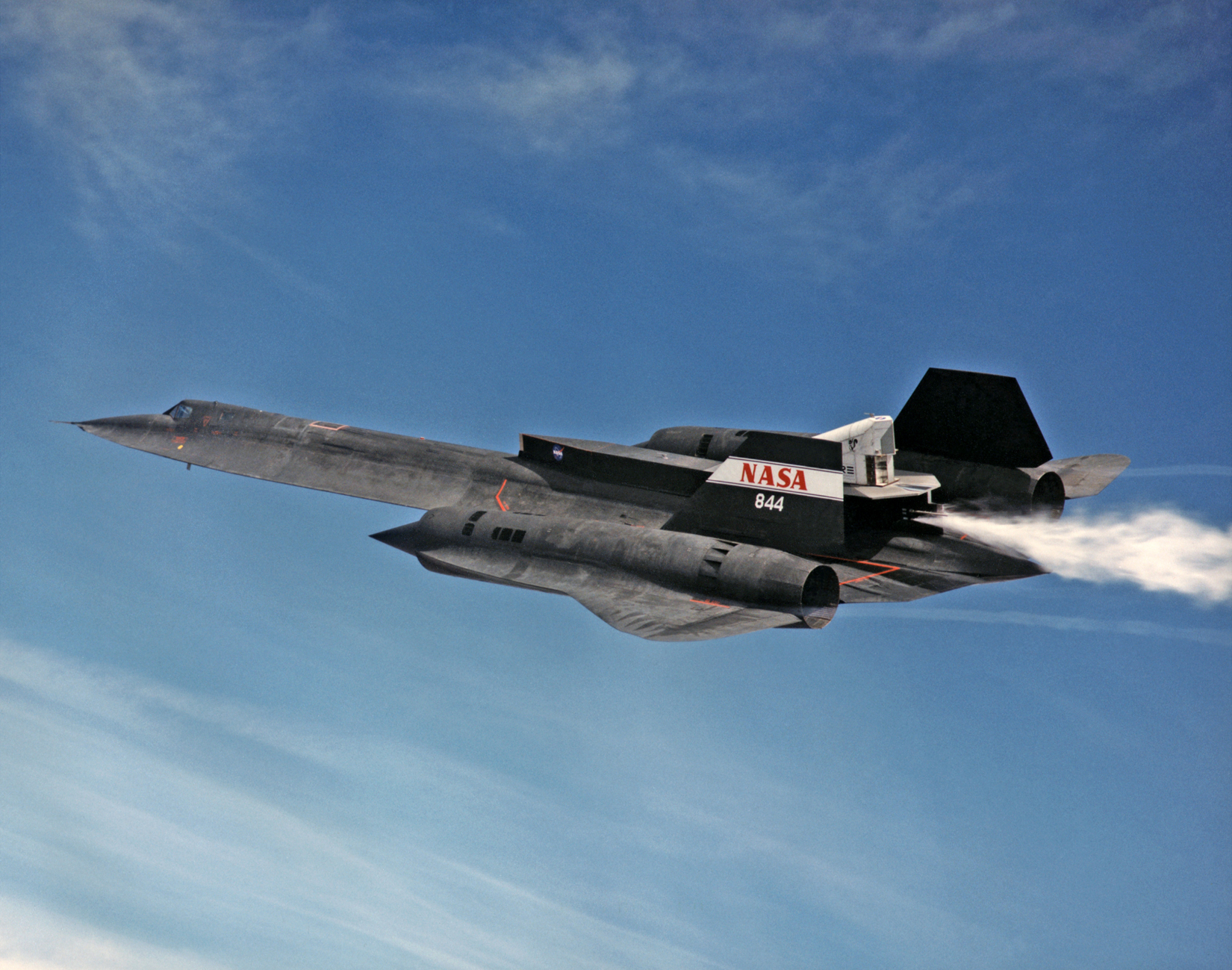
LASRE cold test dumping water after first in-flight cold flow test - 4 March 1998

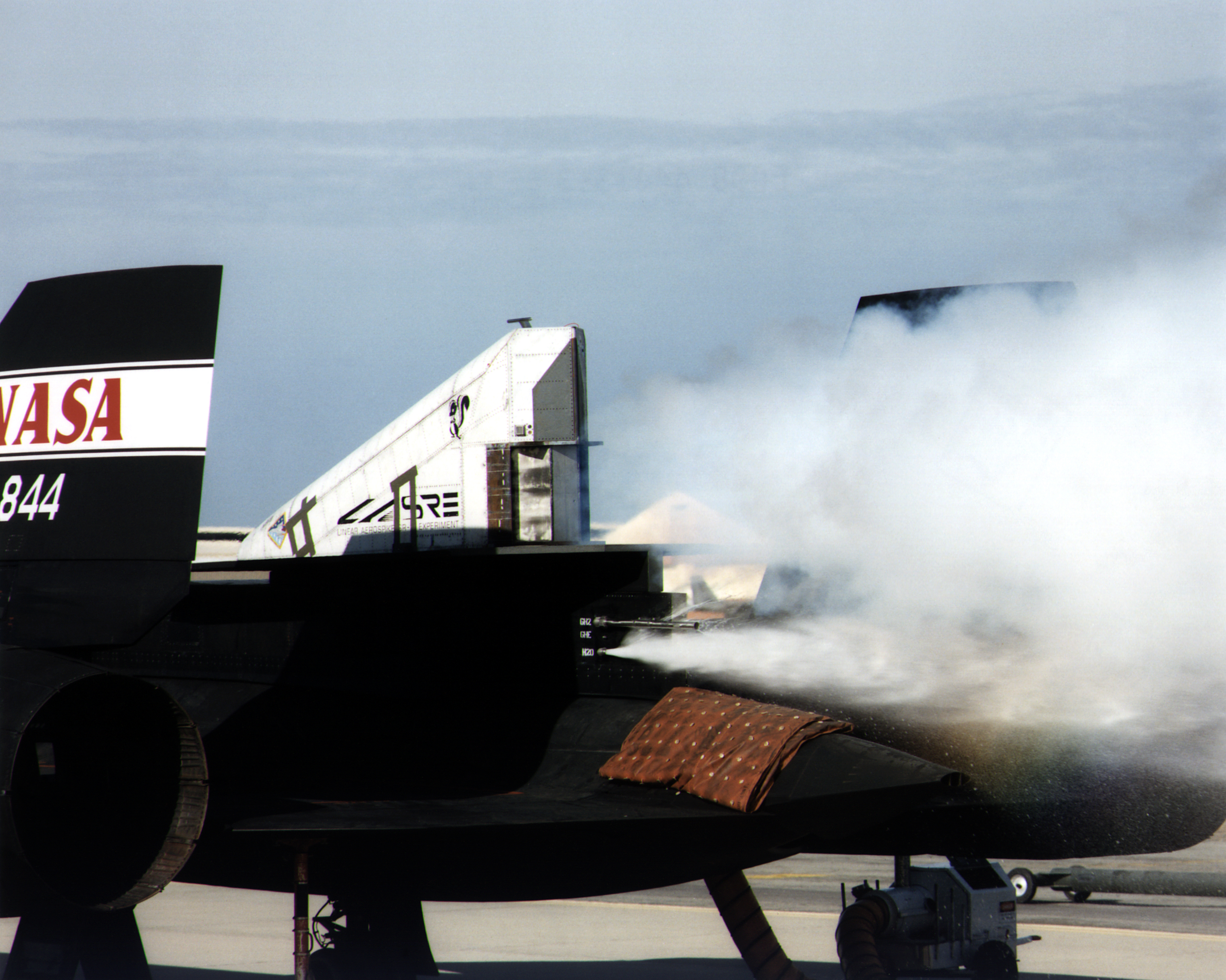
Linear Aerospike SR-71 Experiment (LASRE) ground cold flow test

LASRE was NASA's Linear Aerospike SR-71 Experiment which took place at the Dryden Flight Research Center at Edwards Air Force Base, California, until November 1998. The experiment sought to provide flight data to help Lockheed Martin validate and tune the computational predictive tools used to determine the aerodynamic performance of the Lockheed Martin X-33 lifting body and linear aerospike engine combination and to lay groundwork for a future reusable launch vehicle.

LASRE was a small, half-span model of the X-33's lifting body with eight thrust cells of an aerospike engine, rotated 90 degrees and mounted on the back of a Lockheed SR-71 Blackbird aircraft, to operate like a kind of "flying wind tunnel." The experiment focused on determining how a reusable launch vehicle's engine plume would affect the aerodynamics of its lifting body shape at specific altitudes and speeds reaching about 750 miles/hour (335 meter/second or 1207 km/h). Design refinements looked to minimize the interaction of the aerodynamic flow with the engine plume, which could create drag.

The aircraft completed seven research flights. Two initial flights were used to determine the aerodynamic characteristics of the LASRE apparatus on the back of the aircraft. The first of those occurred 31 October 1997. The SR-71 took off at 8:31 a.m. (Pacific Standard Time-PST). The aircraft flew for 1:50 hour, reaching Mach 1.2 and an altitude of 33,000 feet (10,000 m), landing at Edwards AFB. The result validated the SR-71/pod configuration.

Five later flights focused on the experiment; two were used to cycle gaseous helium and liquid nitrogen through the experiment to check its plumbing system for leaks and to check engine operation characteristics. The first of these flights occurred 4 March 1998. The SR-71 took off at 10:16 a.m. PST. The aircraft flew for 1:57 hour, reaching Mach 1.58 before landing at Edwards AFB.

During three more flights in the spring and summer of 1998, liquid oxygen was cycled through the engine. In addition, two engine hot firings were conducted on the ground. Researchers decided against a hot-fire flight test because of liquid oxygen leaks in the test apparatus. The ground firings and the airborne cryogenic gas flow tests provided enough information to predict the hot-gas effects of an aerospike engine firing during flight.

== LASRE hardware ==
The experiment itself was a small, half-span model of a lifting body shape. The model contained eight thrust cells of an aerospike engine and was mounted on a housing known as the "canoe," which contained the gaseous hydrogen, helium, and instrumentation gear.

The model, engine, and canoe together were called the "pod." The entire pod was 41 feet (12.5 m) in length and weighed 14,300 lb (6,486 kg). The experimental pod was mounted on a NASA SR-71.

== Hardware and aircraft ==
Lockheed Martin may have used information gained from LASRE and the X-33 Advanced Technology Demonstrator to develop a potential future reusable launch vehicle. NASA and Lockheed Martin were partners in the X-33 program through a cooperative agreement.

The goal of the X-33 program, and a major goal for NASA's Office of Aero-Space Technology, was to enable significant reductions in the cost of access to space, and to promote the creation and delivery of new space services and other activities that would improve U.S. economic competitiveness. The program implemented the National Space Transportation Policy, which is designed to accelerate the development of new launch technologies and concepts to contribute to the continuing commercialization of the national space launch industry.

Both the X-33 and the smaller X-34 technology testbed demonstrator were under the Space Transportation Program Offices at NASA Marshall Space Flight Center, Huntsville, AL. The air-launched, winged X-34 also was to demonstrate technologies applicable to future-generation reusable launch vehicles designed to dramatically lower the cost of access to space.
