= Expansion deflection nozzle =

Type of rocket nozzle

The expansion-deflection nozzle is a rocket nozzle which achieves altitude compensation through interaction of the exhaust gas with the atmosphere, much like the plug and aerospike nozzles.

== Description ==
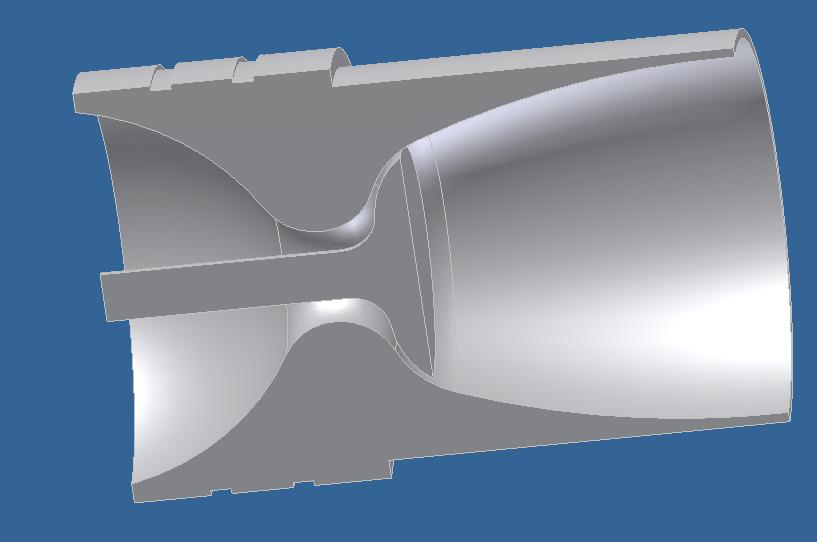
This section through an ED nozzle clearly shows the pintle. In this example the outer wall appears similar to the internal contour of a bell nozzle.

It appears much like a standard bell nozzle, but at the throat is a 'centrebody' or 'pintle' which deflects the flow toward the walls. The exhaust gas flows past this in a more outward direction than in standard bell nozzles while expanding before being turned toward the exit. This allows for shorter nozzles than the standard design while maintaining nozzle expansion ratios. Because of the atmospheric boundary, the atmospheric pressure affects the exit area ratio so that atmospheric compensation can be obtained up to the geometric maximum allowed by the specific nozzle.

The nozzle operates in two distinct modes: open and closed. In closed wake mode, the exhaust gas fills the entire nozzle exit area. The ambient pressure at which the wake changes from open to closed modes is called the design pressure. If the ambient pressure reduces any further, additional expansion will occur outside the nozzle much like a standard bell nozzle and no altitude compensation effect will be gained. In open wake mode, the exit area is dependent on the ambient pressure and the exhaust gas exits the nozzle as an annulus as it does not fill the entire nozzle. Because the ambient pressure controls the exit area, the area ratio should be perfectly compensating to the altitude up to the design pressure.

If the pintle is designed to move along its axis of rotation, the throat area can be varied. This would allow for effective throttling, while maintaining chamber pressure.

Like the aerospike and plug nozzles, if modular combustion chambers were used in place of a single combustion chamber, then thrust vectoring would be achievable by throttling the flow to various chambers.

== Developed models ==
The ED nozzle has been known about since the 1960s and there has been several attempts to develop it, with several reaching the level of static hot-firings. These include the 'Expansion-Deflection 50k' (Rocketdyne), the 'Expansion-Deflection 10k' (Rocketdyne) and the RD-0126 (CADB). Rocketdyne also developed a third, smaller E-D nozzle.

Rocketdyne carried out their work during an initial surge in interest in the 1960s, initially developing the E-D 50k nozzle, which had a chamber pressure of 20.7 bar (2.07 MPa) delivering a thrust of 50,000 lbf (220 kN) and was uncooled, allowing it to be tested for a couple seconds at a time. The E-D 10k nozzle had a chamber pressure of 15.5 bar (1.55 MPa) delivering 10,000 lbf (44 kN), a cooled-thrust chamber and was tested in an altitude simulation facility. The smaller E-D nozzle developed 9,900 lbf (44 kN) and was also used to test the altitude compensation ability. These tests confirmed a performance advantage over equivalent bell nozzles.

The Chemical Automatics Design Bureau E-D nozzle was fully cooled and used for hot-fire tests in 1998. Its centrebody houses the combustion chamber (much like the Astrium design mentioned below) allowing for a reduction in length, beyond that of the improved contouring.

Wickman Spacecraft & Propulsion Company have developed and static-tested a solid motor in conjunction with an E-D.

In 2010, the University of Bristol, UK, successfully tested gaseous hydrogen/air propellants as part of the STERN project. They are also involved in developing knowledge of the in-flight behaviour of the E-D nozzle using a hybrid rocket motor.

== Potential uses ==
While research into this nozzle continues, it could be used before all its advantages are developed. As an upper stage, where it would be used in a low ambient pressure/vacuum environment specifically in closed wake mode, an E-D nozzle would offer weight reductions, length reductions and a potential increase to the specific impulse over bell nozzles (depending on engine cycle) allowing increased payloads. A study suggests it could add an additional 180 kg (400 lb) to the payload of an Ariane 5 over the new Vinci engine provided it is also an expander cycle. Such a nozzle could be brought into service before its altitude compensation abilities were developed.

It is also being investigated for Reaction Engines Skylon spaceplane. Employment on a single-stage-to-orbit (SSTO) rocket would use an E-D nozzle's altitude compensating abilities fully, allowing for a substantial increase in payload. Reaction Engines, Airborne Engineering and the University of Bristol are currently involved in the STERN (Static Test Expansion deflection Rocket Nozzle) project to assess the abilities of the E-D nozzle, and to develop the technology.
