= VentureStar =

Human-rated re-usable spaceplane concept

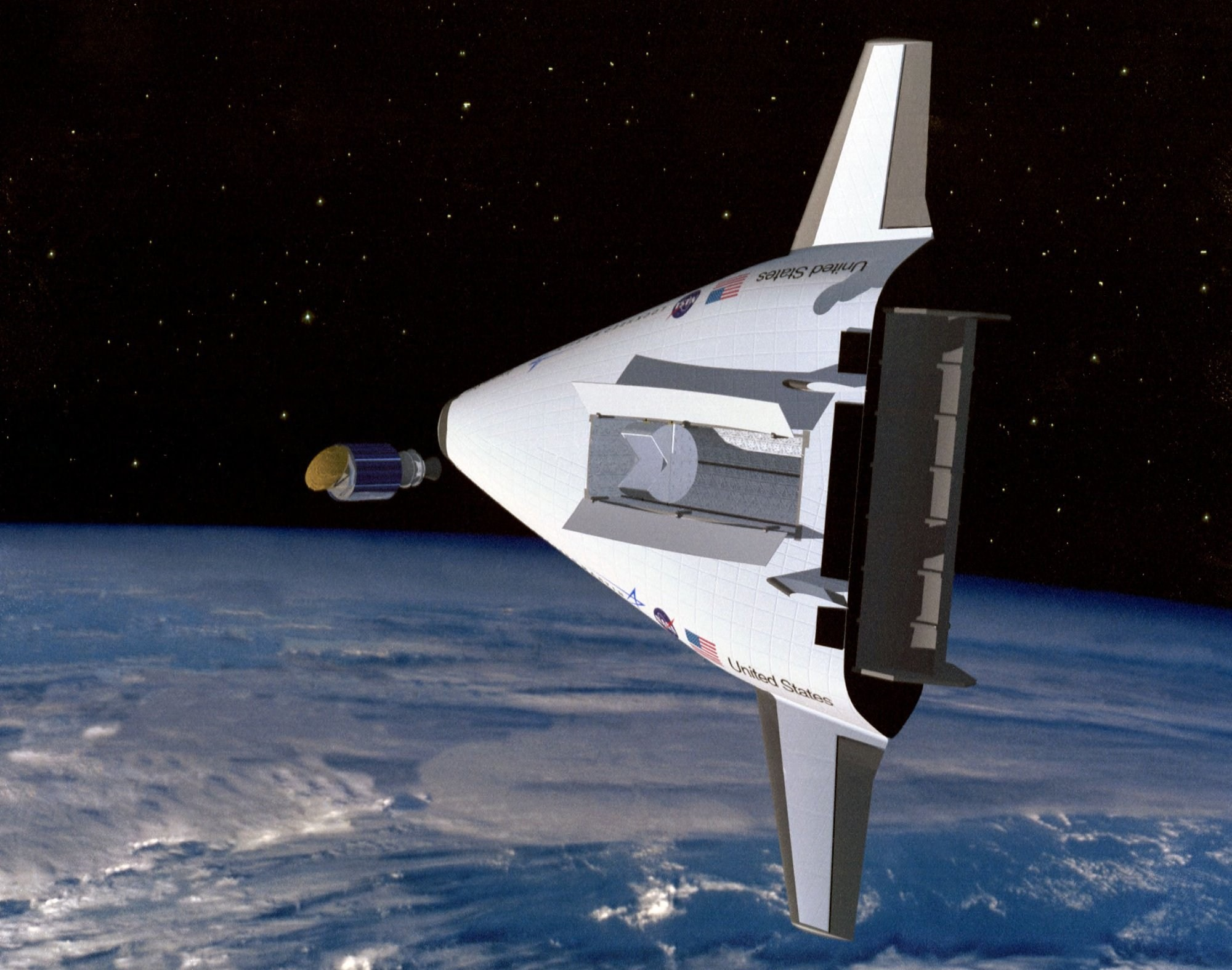
- Simulated view of VentureStar in low Earth orbit, having released its payload
- Function: Crewed Re-usable Spaceplane
- Manufacturer: Lockheed Martin
- Country of origin: United States

Size
- Height: 38.7 m (127 ft)
- Diameter: 39.0 m (128.0 ft)
- Mass: 1,000,000 kg (2,200,000 lb)
- Stages: 1

Capacity

Payload to LEO
- Mass: 20,000 kg (44,000 lb)

Launch history
- Status: Cancelled
- Launch sites: Kennedy, LC-39A
- Total launches: 0

First stage – VentureStar
- Powered by: 7 Rocketdyne RS-2200 Linear Aerospikes
- Maximum thrust: 3,010,000 lbf (13.4 MN)
- Propellant: LOX/LH2

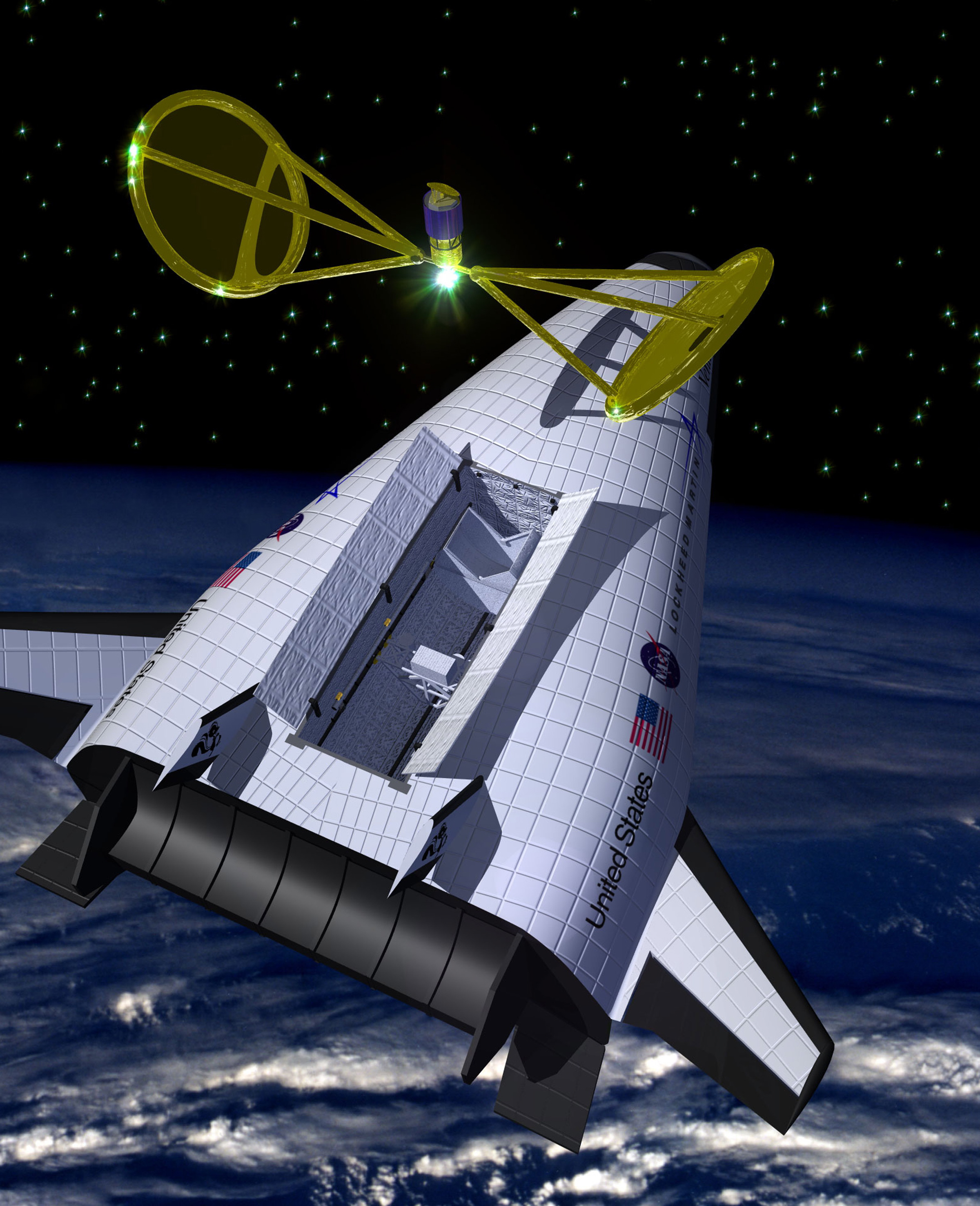
VentureStar releasing a spacecraft

VentureStar was a single-stage-to-orbit reusable launch system proposed by Lockheed Martin and funded by the U.S. government. The goal was to replace the Space Shuttle by developing a re-usable spaceplane that could launch satellites into orbit at 1/10 of the cost. While the requirement was for an uncrewed launcher, it was expected to carry passengers as cargo. The VentureStar would have had a wingspan of 68 feet (20.7 m), a length of 127 feet (38.7 m), and would have weighed roughly 1,000 tonnes (2.2 million lb).

VentureStar was intended to be a commercial single-stage-to-orbit vehicle that would be launched vertically, but return to Earth as an airplane. Flights would have been leased to NASA as needed. After failures with the X-33 subscale technology demonstrator test vehicle, funding was cancelled in 2001.

VentureStar was essentially a bigger version of the X-33 but was not produced. The X-33 had ongoing problems meeting performance requirements for the carbon fiber hydrogen fuel tank. There were a number of other technologies that were part of the program, including the linear aerospike rocket engine. One point of praise was the metallic thermal protection system (TPS) developed by BF Goodrich.

== Advantages ==
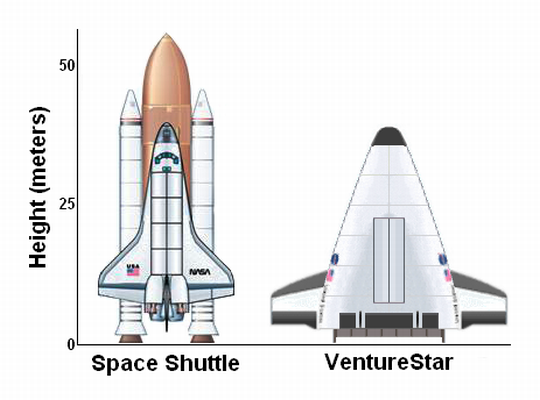
VentureStar would have stood approximately 17 meters shorter than the Space Shuttle.

VentureStar's engineering and design would have offered numerous advantages over the Space Shuttle, notably considerable savings in time and materials, as well as increased safety. VentureStar was expected to launch satellites into orbit at US$2,000 per kilogram, 1/10 of the Space Shuttle's cost of US$20,000 per kilogram.

Readying VentureStar for flight would have dramatically differed from that of the Space Shuttle. Unlike the Space Shuttle orbiter, which had to be lifted and assembled together with several other heavy components (a large external tank, plus two solid rocket boosters), VentureStar was to be simply inspected in a hangar similarly to an airplane.

Also unlike the Space Shuttle, VentureStar would not have relied upon solid rocket boosters, which had to be hauled out of the ocean and then refurbished after each launch. Furthermore, design specifications called for the use of linear aerospike engines that maintain thrust efficiency at all altitudes, whereas the Shuttle relied upon conventional nozzle engines which achieve maximum efficiency at only a certain altitude.

VentureStar would have used a new metallic thermal protection system, safer and cheaper to maintain than the ceramic protection system used on the Space Shuttle. VentureStar's metallic heat shield would have eliminated 17,000 between-flight maintenance hours typically required to satisfactorily check (and replace if needed) the thousands of heat-resistant ceramic tiles that composed the Shuttle heat shield.

VentureStar was expected to be safer than most modern rockets. Whereas most modern rockets fail catastrophically when an engine fails, VentureStar would have a thrust reserve in each engine in the event of an emergency. For example, if an engine on VentureStar failed during ascent, another engine would shut off to counterbalance the failed thrust, and each of the remaining working engines could throttle up to safely continue the mission.

Unlike the Space Shuttle, whose solid rocket boosters produced chemical wastes, primarily hydrogen chloride, during launch, VentureStar's exhaust would have been composed of only water vapor, since VentureStar's main fuels would have been only liquid hydrogen and liquid oxygen. This would have given VentureStar the benefit of being environmentally clean. VentureStar's simpler design would have excluded hypergolic propellants and even hydraulics, relying instead upon electrical power for flight controls, doors and landing gear.

Because of its lighter design, VentureStar would have been able to land at almost any major airport in an emergency, whereas the Space Shuttle required much longer runways than available at most public airports.

== Cancellation ==
The VentureStar program was cancelled in 2001 due to development cost concerns accompanied by technical problems and failures in the X-33 program, a program which was intended as proof-of-concept for some of the critical technologies that were to be implemented in the VentureStar. The failure during a test of the X-33's complex, multi-lobe composite-structure cryogenic hydrogen tank was one of the main reasons for the cancellation of both the X-33 and the VentureStar. The failure was ultimately attributed to cryo-pumping, a phenomenon in which the cryogenic temperatures of the liquid hydrogen inside the tank caused moisture and air to enter the tank's structure and freeze, causing damage. This flaw was foreseen earlier in design, but was not addressed, because doing so would increase the mass of the hydrogen tank, adding to the vehicle's already problematic instability. Plans were made to replace the complex and unproven composite tank design with an Al-Li alloy one. In addition to making the tank more reliable and easier to manufacture, this would also make the tanks lighter, as they would require less supporting structures. This plan was stopped due to pressure from congress to continue developing composite tanks. The unexpectedly high mass of the aerospike engines would have required ballast to be added to the vehicle's nose to maintain stability in addition to larger rear stabilizers, further reducing its payload capacity. Ultimately, the VentureStar program relied too heavily on unproven technologies, resulting in failures, uncertainty, and a cost too high to be viable.

== Program hardware ==
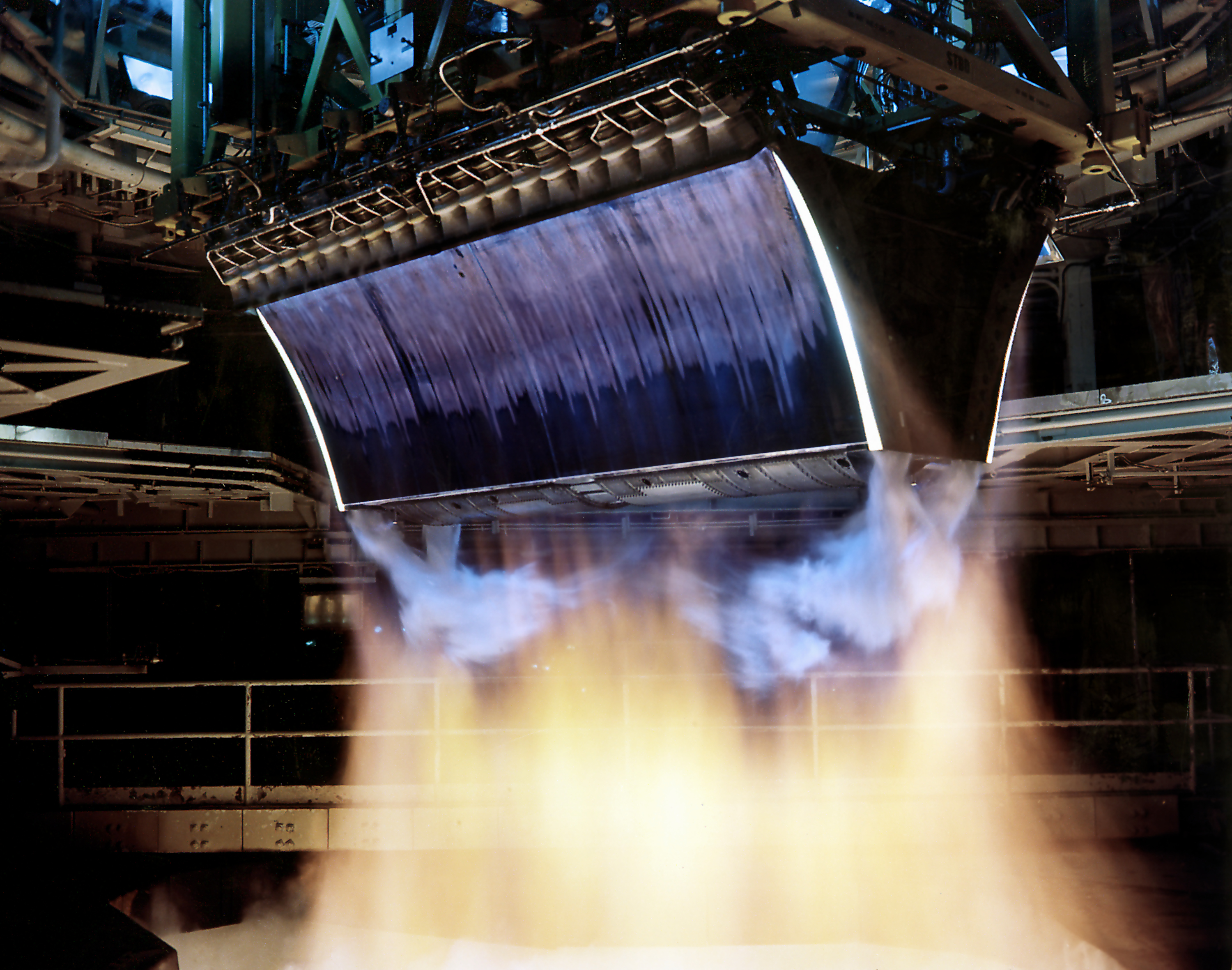
XRS-2200 linear aerospike engine

Examples:

- Metallic TPS
- XRS-2200 Linear aerospike main engines
- LOX tanks

One of the technological barriers at the time was the hydrogen fuel tank. One positive was that several years later the performance requirements for such a hydrogen tank were achieved, as NASA gained more experience with cryogenic carbon fiber fuel tanks.

On September 7, 2004, Northrop Grumman and NASA engineers unveiled a liquid hydrogen tank made of carbon fiber composite material that had demonstrated the ability for repeated fuelings and simulated launch cycles. The tank was a simple cylinder, not the complex shape used for the X-33. Northrop Grumman concluded that these successful tests enabled the development and refinement of new manufacturing processes that allowed the company to build large composite tanks without an autoclave; and design and engineering development of conformal fuel tanks appropriate for use on a single-stage-to-orbit vehicle.

== In fiction ==
In the 2001 novella and 2015 novel Lash-Up by Larry Bond and Chris Carlson, the VentureStar prototype is converted into an armed spacecraft named Defender in order to protect US space assets from China, which is using a space gun to destroy GPS satellites.

In John Varley's novel Red Thunder and sequels, one of the major protagonists is a former VentureStar pilot.

In the television series Star Trek: Enterprise, an operational VentureStar spaceplane is included in the opening credits as part of the history of human spaceflight.

In the television series Space Island One, a fleet of VentureStars resupply the titular commercial space station.

In the 2009 science fiction film Avatar, an interstellar space ship taking the characters to and from the Alpha Centauri system is named the ISV Venture Star.

== Diagram ==
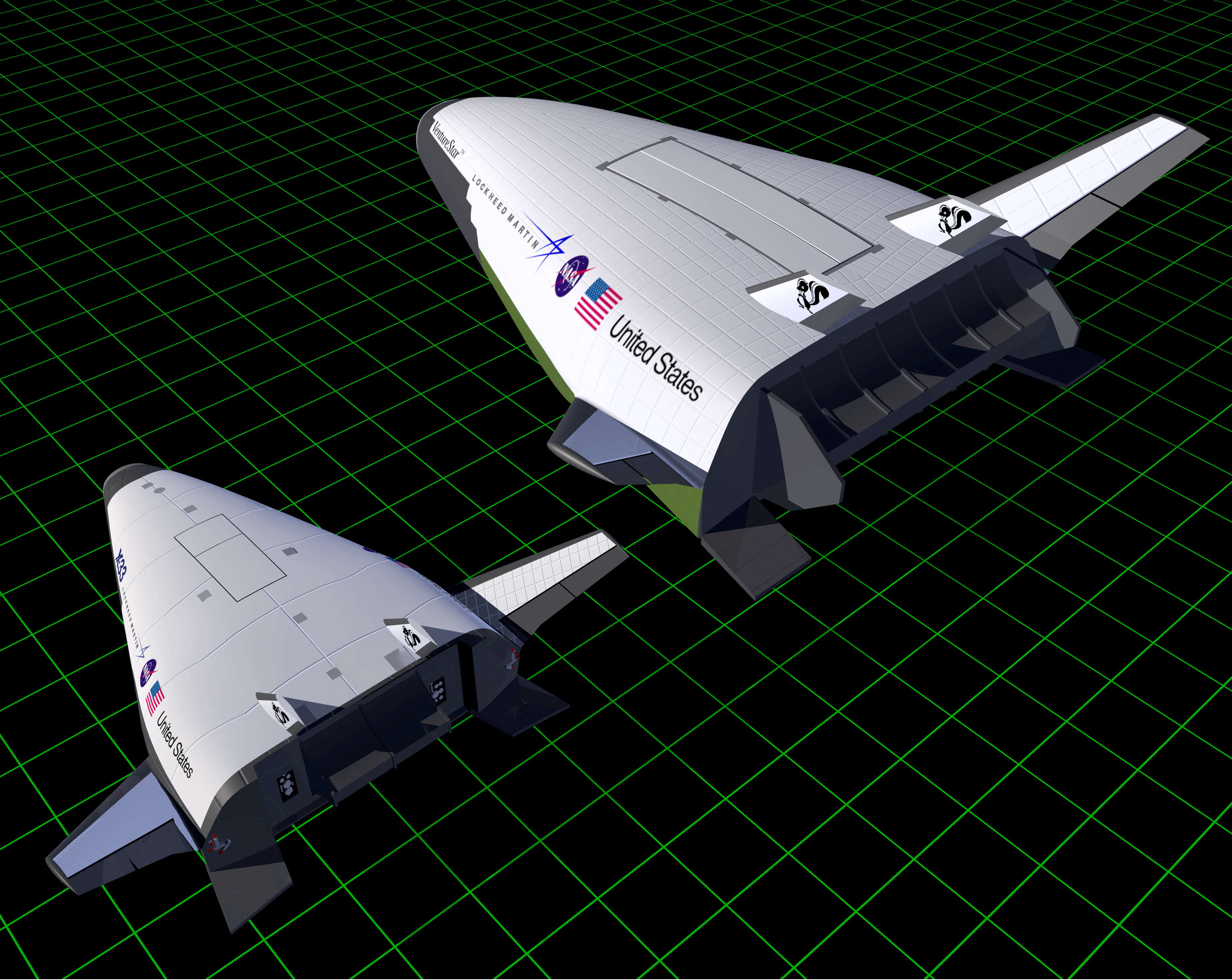
The X-33 (left) and VentureStar design (right)

== See also ==
- Lockheed Martin X-33
- Skylon (spacecraft)
- Orbital Sciences X-34
