= RS-2200 =

Cancelled experimental aerospike engine

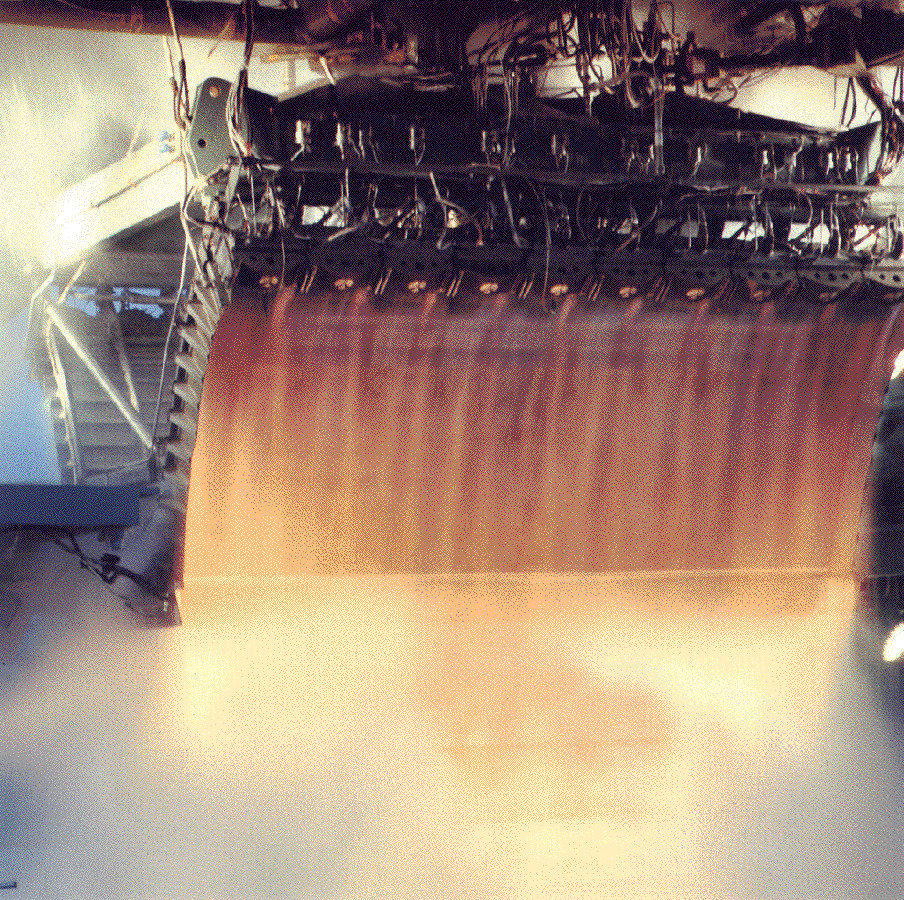
- Linear aerospike test firing
- Country of origin: United States
- Date: 1990's
- Designer: Rocketdyne
- Application: VentureStar
- Predecessor: XRS-2200
- Status: Development Canceled

Liquid-fuel engine
- Propellant: LOX / LH2

Configuration
- Nozzle ratio: 173:1

Performance
- Thrust, vacuum: 2,201 kN (495,000 lbf)
- Thrust, sea-level: 1,917 kN (431,000 lbf)
- Thrust-to-weight ratio: 83:1
- Chamber pressure: 155 bar (2,250 psi)
- Specific impulse, vacuum: 455 seconds
- Specific impulse, sea-level: 347 seconds

Dimensions
- Measurement: Forward End: 6.4 m (250 in) wide, 2.4 m (94 in) long Aft End: 2.4 m (94 in) wide, 2.4 m (94 in) long Forward to Aft: 4.3 m (170 in)

The Rocketdyne RS-2200 was an experimental linear aerospike rocket engine developed by Rocketdyne for Lockheed Martin's VentureStar program. The program was ultimately cancelled in 2001 before any RS-2200 engines were assembled.

== XRS-2200 ==
The XRS-2200 was a subscale testbed engine intended to be developed into the full-scale RS-2200. Unlike its full-scale counterpart, this engine made it to the test stand and accumulated approximately 1,600 seconds of hot-fire testing.
