= RD-0126 =

Russian rocket engine

RD-0126E (РД-0126Э)
- Country of origin: Russia
- Date: 1998
- Designer: KBKhA, I. V. Liplyaviy
- Application: Upper stage

Liquid-fuel engine
- Propellant: Liquid oxygen / liquid hydrogen
- Mixture ratio: 6.0
- Cycle: Expander cycle

Configuration
- Chamber: 1
- Nozzle ratio: 720

Performance
- Thrust, vacuum: 39.2 kN (8,800 lbf)
- Chamber pressure: 6.67 MPa (967 psi) - 7.85 MPa (1,139 psi)
- Specific impulse, vacuum: 470 s (4.6 km/s) - 472 s (4.63 km/s)

Dimensions
- Length: 1.9 m (6 ft 3 in)
- Diameter: 1.59 m (5 ft 3 in)
- Dry mass: 234 kg (516 lb)

The RD-0126 "Yastreb" (РД-0126 «Ястреб») was a liquid-fuel cryogenic rocket engine burning liquid hydrogen and liquid oxygen, developed by KBKhA Kosberg in Voronezh, Russia. The RD-0126 variant had a conventional de Laval nozzle, while the RD-0126E (РД-0126Э) was designed and constructed with an expansion-deflection nozzle. Both variants were designed to produce 39.2 kN (8,812.5 lb_{f}) of thrust.

The expansion-deflection nozzle of the RD-0126E was designed to increase the efficiency of an expander cycle by maximising heat transfer to the fuel that drove the engine's turbopumps, while also allowing for a greater expansion ratio for a certain length of nozzle. In 1998, the RD-0126E underwent hot-fire testing. The engine was proposed as the upper-stage engine for an upgrade of the Soyuz-2.1 launch vehicle, named Onega. All work ceased on the RD-0126 in 2002.

== Development ==
In 1992, KBKhA Kosberg began the development of a new hydrogen-oxygen rocket engine, to feature a novel expansion-deflection nozzle. In this arrangement, the combustion chamber of the engine is placed downstream of the nozzle throat, where the flow of exhaust gases is supersonic. In 1995, KBKhA, using internal funding, continued to develop the engine for roles such as launch vehicle upper stages and space tugs. Consequently, RSC Energia issued terms of reference for the project, naming the new engine RD-0126. Work continued, and in 1998, the engine was subjected to a series of tests in which it was fired on a ground-based test stand. Four tests were conducted, each lasting for about 30 seconds, and testing the engine at combustion chamber pressures from 35 standard atmospheres (3.5 MPa) up to 73 standard atmospheres (7.4 MPa). During these tests, the engine walls were cooled by water supplied from the test stand. The testing confirmed the predicted properties of the engine and showed that flow separation did not occur within the nozzle when the non-regeneratively cooled extension was not installed.

The engine was planned to form the basis of the upper stage of the now-cancelled Onega launch vehicle, a major upgrade to the Soyuz-2.1.

By 2002, all work on the engine had ceased. As of 2023, KBKhA states that all work on the engine has been completed.

== Versions ==
- RD-0126 - version of the engine with conventional de Laval nozzle. Chamber pressure 5.89 MPa (854 psi), mass 240 kg (530 lb), specific impulse 470s.
- RD-0126E - version using the expansion-deflection nozzle; hot-fired four times in 1998.

== See also ==
- RD-0146 - hydrogen-oxygen expander rocket engine also developed by KBKhA.
- Rocket engine
