= Lockheed Martin X-33 =

Uncrewed re-usable spaceplane technology demonstrator for the VentureStar

X-33
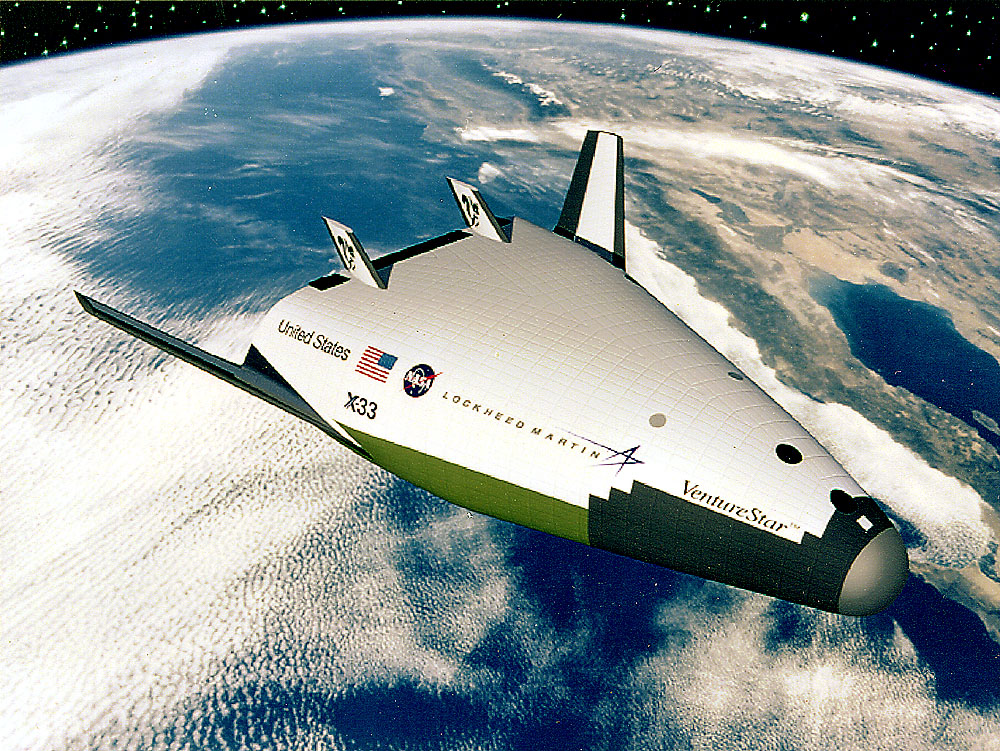
- Artist's rendition of the X-33 in orbit.
- Function: Uncrewed re-usable spaceplane technology demonstrator
- Manufacturer: Lockheed Martin
- Country of origin: United States
- Project cost: $922 million NASA + $357 million Lockheed Martin

Size
- Height: 20 m (66 ft)
- Mass: 129,000 kg (285,000 lb)
- Stages: 1

Launch history
- Status: Canceled

Engine details
- Powered by: 2 XRS-2200 linear aerospikes
- Maximum thrust: 1,800 kN (410,000 lbf)
- Propellant: LOX/LH2

The Lockheed Martin X-33 was a proposed uncrewed, sub-scale technology demonstrator suborbital spaceplane that was developed for a period in the 1990s. The X-33 was a technology demonstrator for the VentureStar orbital spaceplane, which was planned to be a next-generation, commercially operated reusable launch vehicle. The X-33 would flight-test a range of technologies that NASA believed it needed for single-stage-to-orbit reusable launch vehicles (SSTO RLVs), such as metallic thermal protection systems, composite cryogenic fuel tanks for liquid hydrogen, the aerospike engine, autonomous (uncrewed) flight control, rapid flight turn-around times through streamlined operations, and its lifting body aerodynamics.

Failures of its 21-meter wingspan and multi-lobed, composite-material fuel tank during pressure testing ultimately led to the withdrawal of federal support for the program in early 2001. Lockheed Martin has conducted unrelated testing, and had a single success after a string of failures using a 2-meter scale model.

== History ==
In 1994 NASA initiated the Reusable Launch Vehicle (RLV) program. After a Phase I programme developing proposals from Rockwell International, McDonnell Douglas, and Lockheed Martin, a Phase II contract to develop the X-33 as a demonstrator vehicle was awarded to Lockheed Martin in 1996. At the same time Orbital Sciences was awarded a contract to develop the X-34, an air-launched hypersonic research vehicle.

The goals of the RLV program were:

- To "demonstrate technologies leading to a new generation of space boosters capable of delivering payloads at significantly lower cost"
- To "provide a technology base for development of advanced commercial launch systems that will make U.S. aerospace manufacturers more competitive in the global market."

$1 billion was spent through 1999 with about 80 percent coming from NASA and additional money contributed by the industry partners. The goal was to have a first flight by March 1999, and to have the VentureStar, the operational reusable space vehicle, flying in 2006.

.. to build a vehicle that takes days, not months, to turn around; dozens, not thousands, of people to operate; with launch costs that are a tenth of what they are now. Our goal is a reusable launch vehicle that will cut the cost of getting a pound of payload to orbit from $10,000 to $1,000.

— D. Goldin NASA administrator on the RLV program

=== Cancellation ===
The program was cancelled in February 2001.

Construction of the prototype was some 85% assembled with 96% of the parts and the launch facility 100% complete when the program was canceled by NASA in 2001, after a long series of technical difficulties including flight instability and excess weight.

In particular, the composite liquid hydrogen fuel tank failed during testing in November 1999. The tank was constructed of honeycomb composite walls and internal structures to reduce its weight. A lighter tank was needed for the craft to demonstrate necessary technologies for single-stage-to-orbit operations. A hydrogen fueled SSTO craft's mass fraction requires that the weight of the vehicle without fuel be 10% of the fully fueled weight. This would allow a vehicle to fly to low Earth orbit without the need for the sort of external boosters and fuel tanks used by the Space Shuttle. But, after the composite tank failed on the test stand during fueling and pressure tests, NASA came to the conclusion that the technology of the time was simply not advanced enough for such a design. While the composite tank walls themselves were lighter, the hydrogen tank shape necessary to fit inside the aerodynamic mouldline resulted in complex joints increasing the total mass of the composite tank to above that of an aluminum-based tank, and too heavy for an SSTO vehicle.

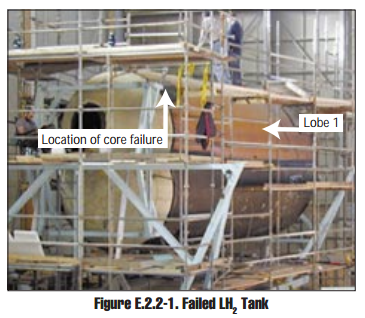
Microcracking problem discovered in the liquid-hydrogen (LH2) multi-lobed tank core by NASA scientists at Goddard Space Flight Center ultimately caused NASA to cancel the X-33 program

NASA had invested $922 million in the project before cancellation, and Lockheed Martin a further $357 million. Due to changes in the space launch business—including the challenges faced by companies such as Globalstar, Teledesic, and Iridium and the resulting drop in the anticipated number of commercial satellite launches per year, Lockheed Martin concluded that continuing development of the X-33 privately without government support would not be profitable.

In 2004 Northrop Grumman successfully built and tested a simple cylindrical composite cryogenic hydrogen tank as part of early work for the Constellation program.

== Design and development ==
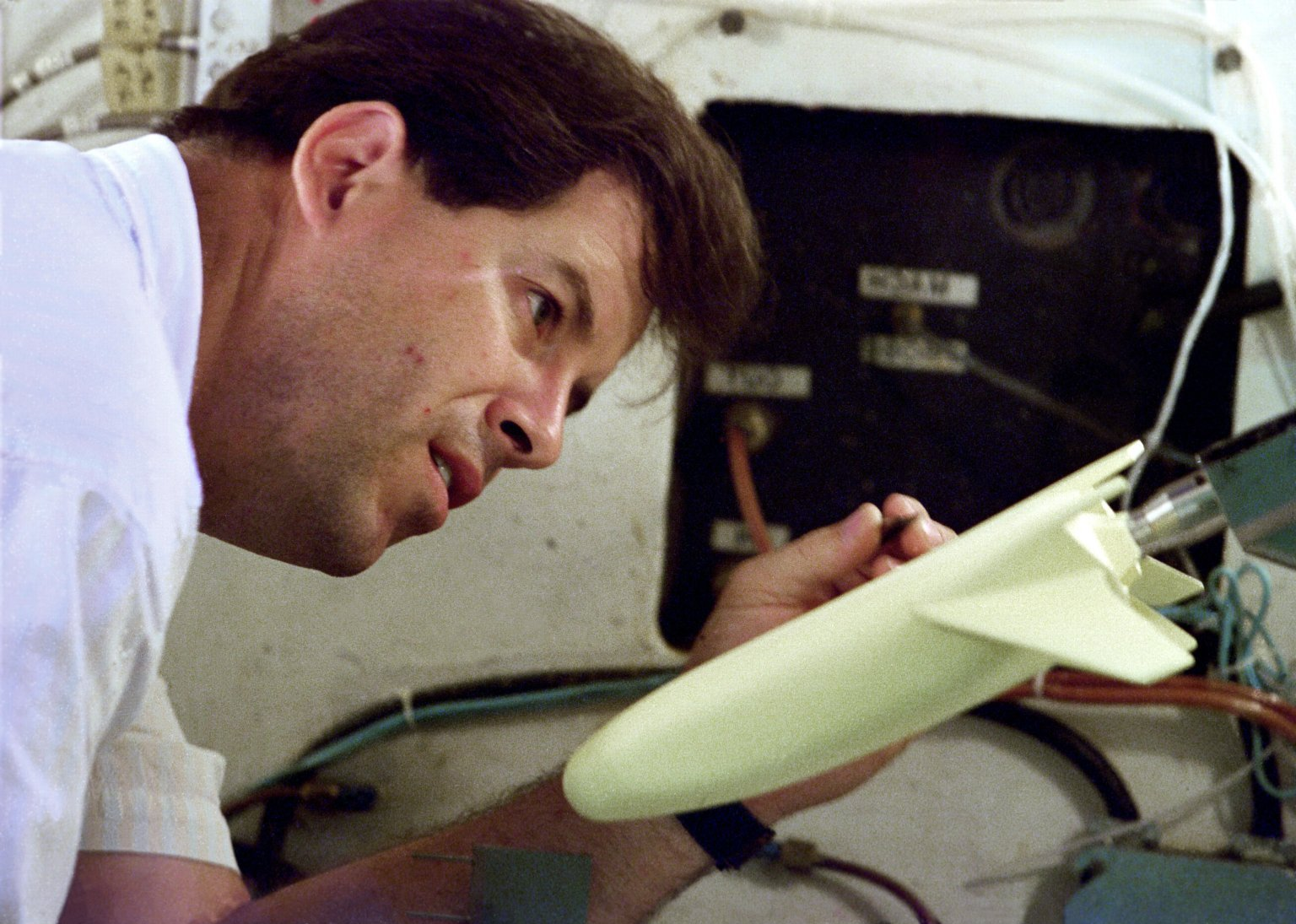
X-33 model being prepared for testing in a wind-tunnel in 1997

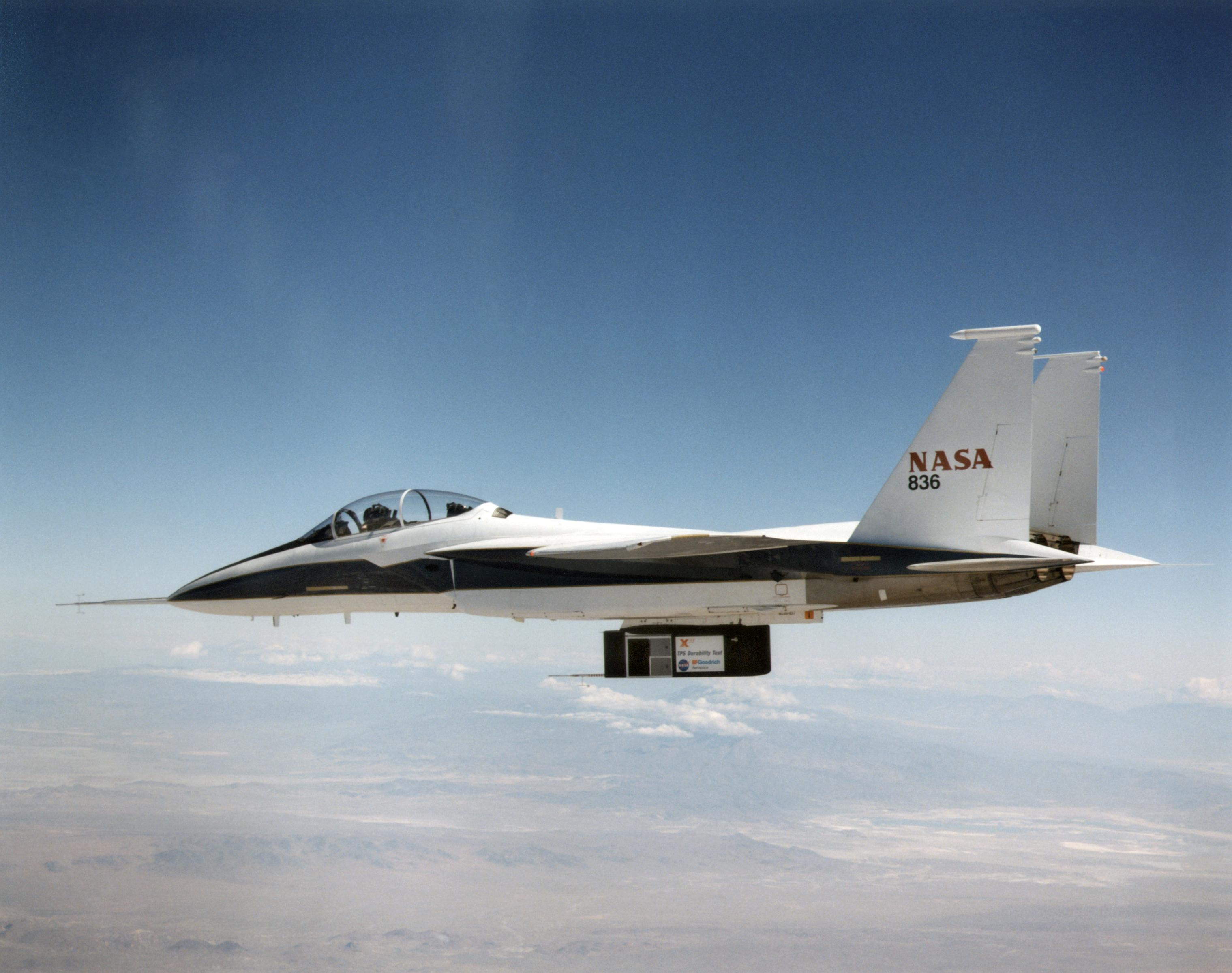
Test of the X-33's thermal protection system, 1998

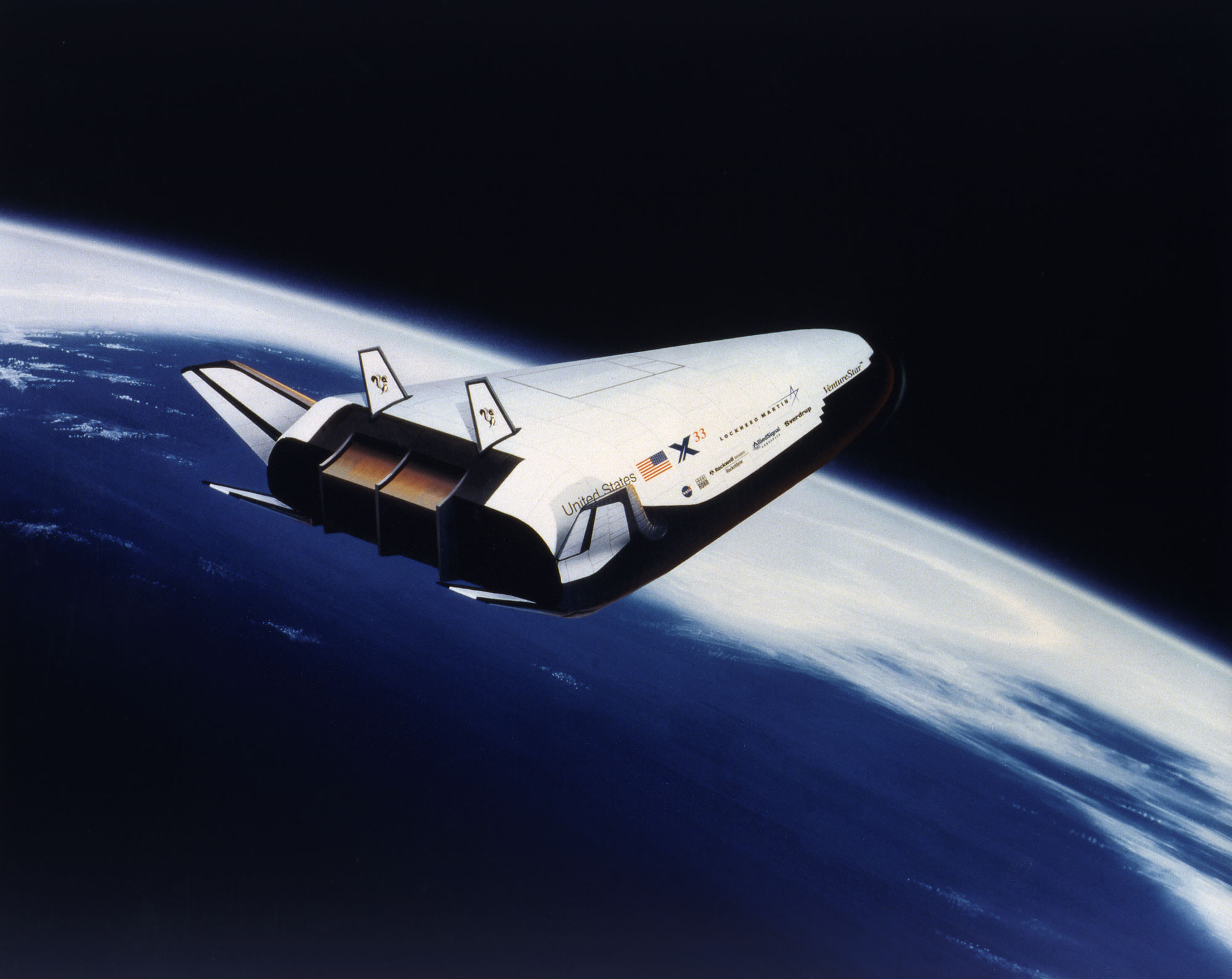
Space art of X-33 at high altitude

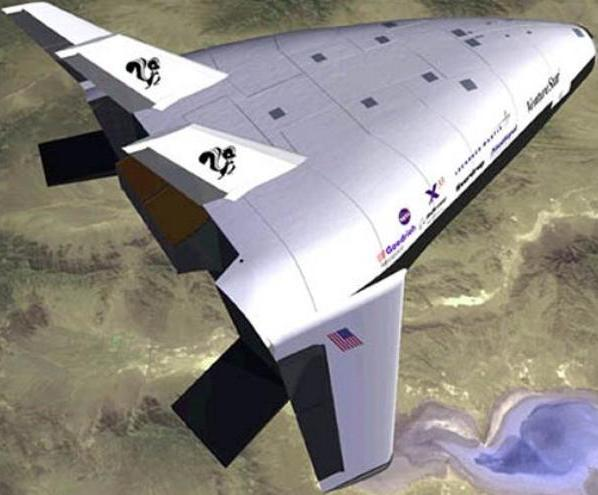
Simulated in-flight view of the X-33.

Through the use of the lifting body shape, composite multi-lobed liquid fuel tanks, and the aerospike engine, NASA and Lockheed Martin hoped to test fly a craft that would demonstrate the viability of a single-stage-to-orbit (SSTO) design. A spacecraft capable of reaching orbit in a single stage would not require external fuel tanks or boosters to reach low Earth orbit. Doing away with the need for "staging" with launch vehicles, such as with the Shuttle and the Apollo rockets, would lead to an inherently more reliable and safer space launch vehicle. While the X-33 would not approach airplane-like safety, the X-33 would attempt to demonstrate 0.997 reliability, or 3 mishaps out of 1,000 launches, which would be an order of magnitude more reliable than the Space Shuttle. The 15 planned experimental X-33 flights could only begin this statistical evaluation.

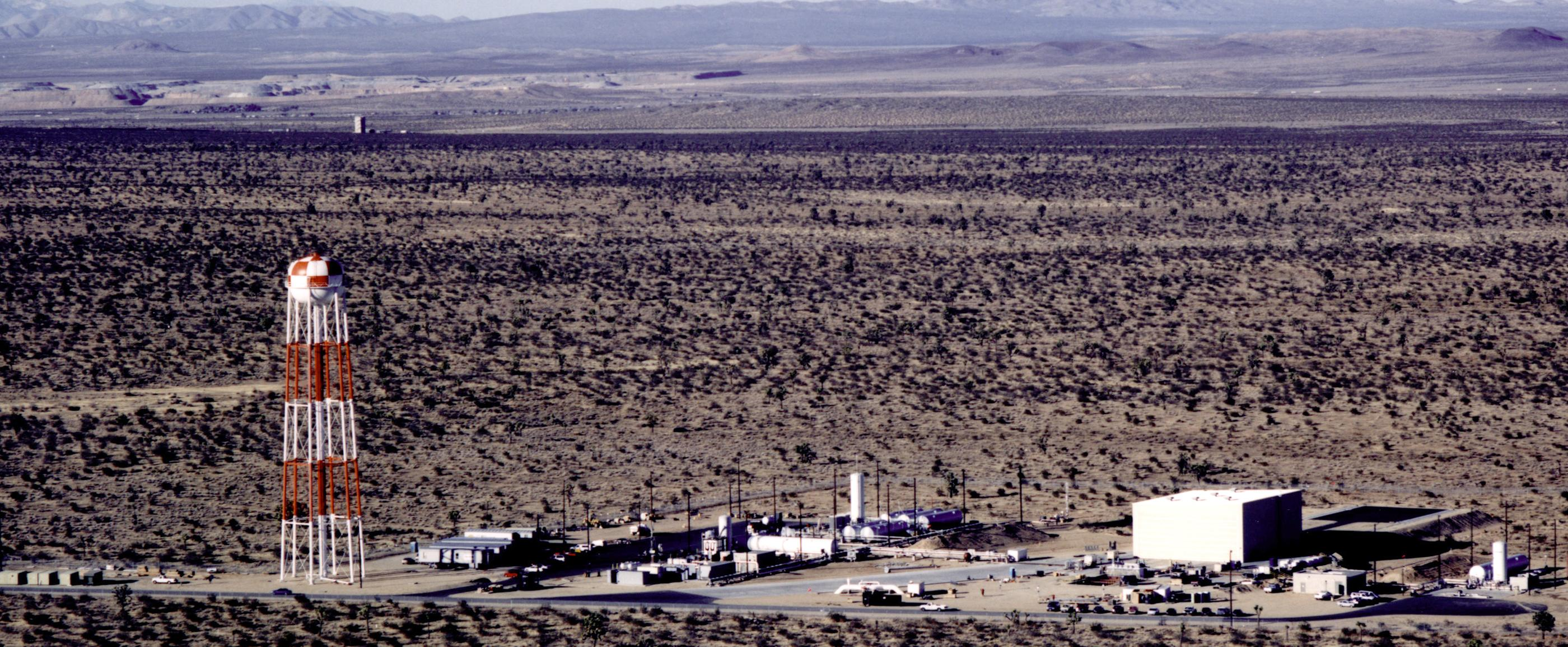
X-33 launch facility already completed at Edwards Air Force Base

The uncrewed craft would have been launched vertically from a specially designed facility constructed on Edwards Air Force Base, and landed horizontally (VTHL) on a runway at the end of its mission. Initial sub-orbital test flights were planned from Edwards AFB to Dugway Proving Grounds southwest of Salt Lake City, Utah.

Once those test flights were completed, further flight tests were to be conducted from Edwards AFB to Malmstrom AFB in Great Falls, Montana, to gather more complete data on aircraft heating and engine performance at higher speeds and altitudes.

On July 2, 1996, NASA selected Lockheed Martin Skunk Works of Palmdale, California, to design, build, and test the X-33 experimental vehicle for the RLV program. Lockheed Martin's design concept for the X-33 was selected over competing concepts from Rockwell International and McDonnell Douglas. Rockwell proposed a Space Shuttle-derived design, and McDonnell Douglas proposed a design based on its vertical takeoff and landing (VTVL) DC-XA test vehicle.

The uncrewed X-33 was slated to fly 15 suborbital hops to near 75.8 km altitude. It was to be launched upright like a rocket and rather than having a straight flight path it would fly diagonally up for half the flight, reaching extremely high altitudes, and then for the rest of the flight glide back down to a runway. Initially, the landing gear assembly was designed to be a dual wheel assembly for the nose gear and four wheel bogies for the main gears, but was changed to F-15E landing gears with F-16 wheels later in development.

The X-33 was never intended to fly higher than an altitude of 100 km, nor faster than one-half of orbital velocity. Had any successful tests occurred, extrapolation would have been necessary to apply the results to a proposed orbital vehicle.

The decision to design and build the X-33 grew out of an internal NASA study titled "Access to Space". Unlike other space transport studies, "Access to Space" was to result in the design and construction of a vehicle.

=== Commercial spaceflight ===
Based on the X-33 experience shared with NASA, Lockheed Martin hoped to make the business case for a full-scale SSTO RLV, called VentureStar, that would be developed and operated through commercial means. The intention was that rather than operate space transport systems as it has with the Space Shuttle, NASA would instead look to private industry to operate the reusable launch vehicle and NASA would purchase launch services from the commercial launch provider. Thus, the X-33 was not only about honing space flight technologies, but also about successfully demonstrating the technology required to make a commercial reusable launch vehicle possible.

The VentureStar was to be the first commercial aircraft to fly into space. The VentureStar was intended for long inter-continental flights and supposed to be in service by 2012, but this project was never funded or begun.

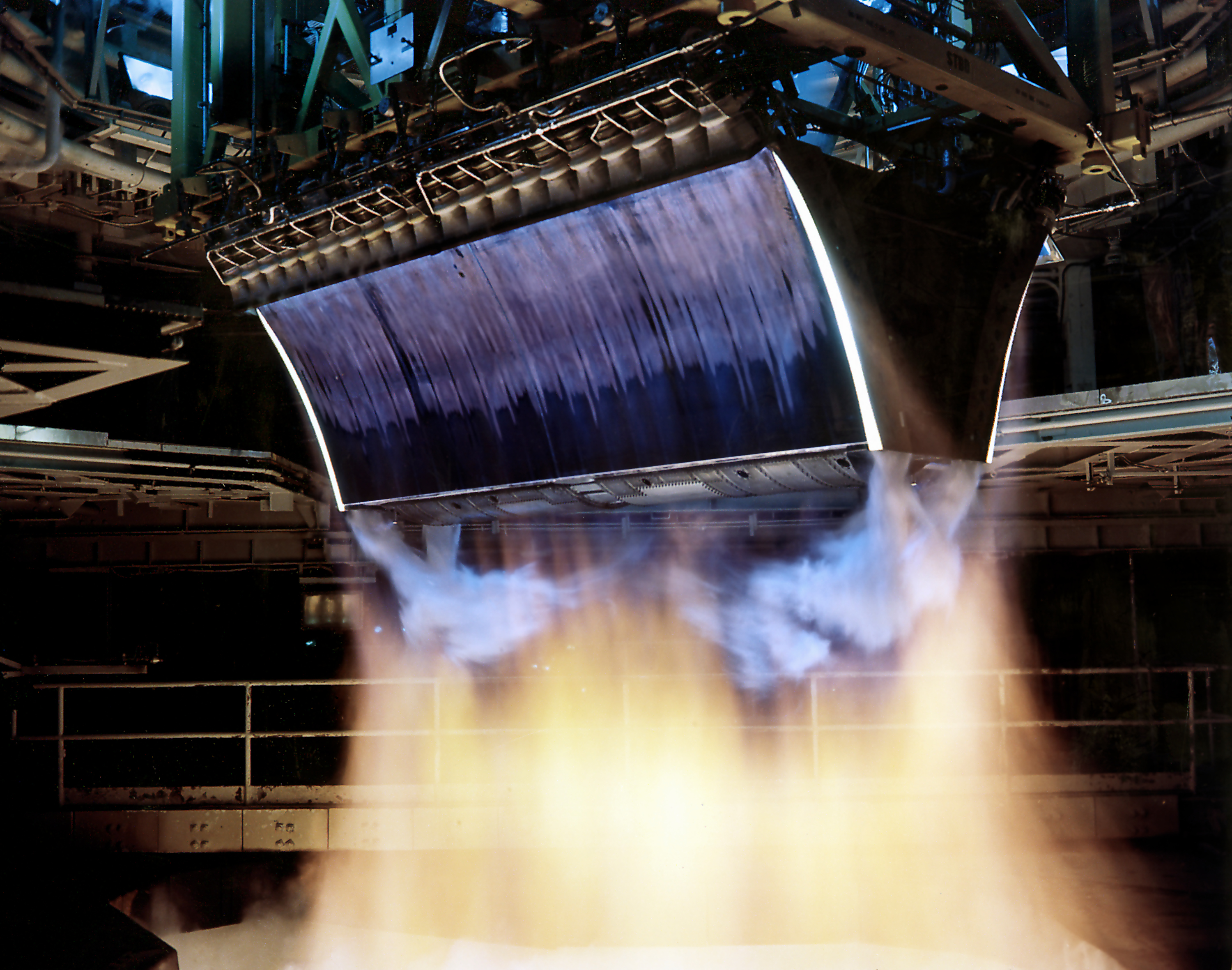
Aerospike engine test at Stennis Space Center, August 6, 2001

General characteristics

- Length: 69 ft (21 m)
- Width: 77 ft (23 m)
- Max takeoff weight: 285,000 lb (129,274 kg)
- Fuel capacity: 210,000 lb (95,000 kg)
- Powerplant: 2 × XRS-2200 linear aerospike rocket engine, 410,000 lbf (1,800 kN) thrust each

Performance

- Maximum speed: 9,896 mph (15,926 km/h, 8,599 kn)
- Maximum speed: Mach 13

=== Continued research ===
After the cancellation in 2001, engineers were able to make a working liquid-oxygen tank from carbon-fiber composite. Tests showed that composites were feasible materials for liquid-oxygen tanks.

On September 7, 2004, Northrop Grumman and NASA engineers unveiled a liquid-hydrogen tank made of carbon-fiber composite material that had demonstrated the ability for repeated fuelings and simulated launch cycles. Northrop Grumman concluded that these successful tests have enabled the development and refinement of new manufacturing processes that will allow the company to build large composite tanks without an autoclave; and design and engineering development of conformal fuel tanks appropriate for use on a single-stage-to-orbit vehicle.

== The alternative proposals ==
Five companies expressed interest and proposed concepts. Of those five Lockheed Martin, Rockwell and McDonnell Douglas were selected for workup into more detailed proposals.

=== Rockwell ===
Rockwell proposed a Space Shuttle-derived design. It would have used one Space Shuttle Main Engine (SSME) and two RL-10-5A engines.

In a subsequent full-scale system to reach orbit Rockwell planned to use six Rocketdyne RS-2100 engines.

=== McDonnell Douglas ===
McDonnell Douglas featured a design using liquid oxygen/hydrogen bell engines based on its vertical takeoff and landing DC-XA test vehicle. It would have used a single SSME for the main propulsion system.

== See also ==
- Airbus Sagitta
- Armadillo Aerospace
- Blue Origin
- Blue Origin New Shepard
- Bristol Spaceplanes
- Interorbital Systems
- Kankoh-maru
- List of NASA cancellations
- Lunar Lander Challenge
- Masten Space Systems
- McDonnell Douglas DC-X
- Quad (rocket)
- Reusable Vehicle Testing program by JAXA
- Skylon (spacecraft)
- SpaceX
- Space Shuttle retirement
- Zarya
