= European Rocketry Challenge =

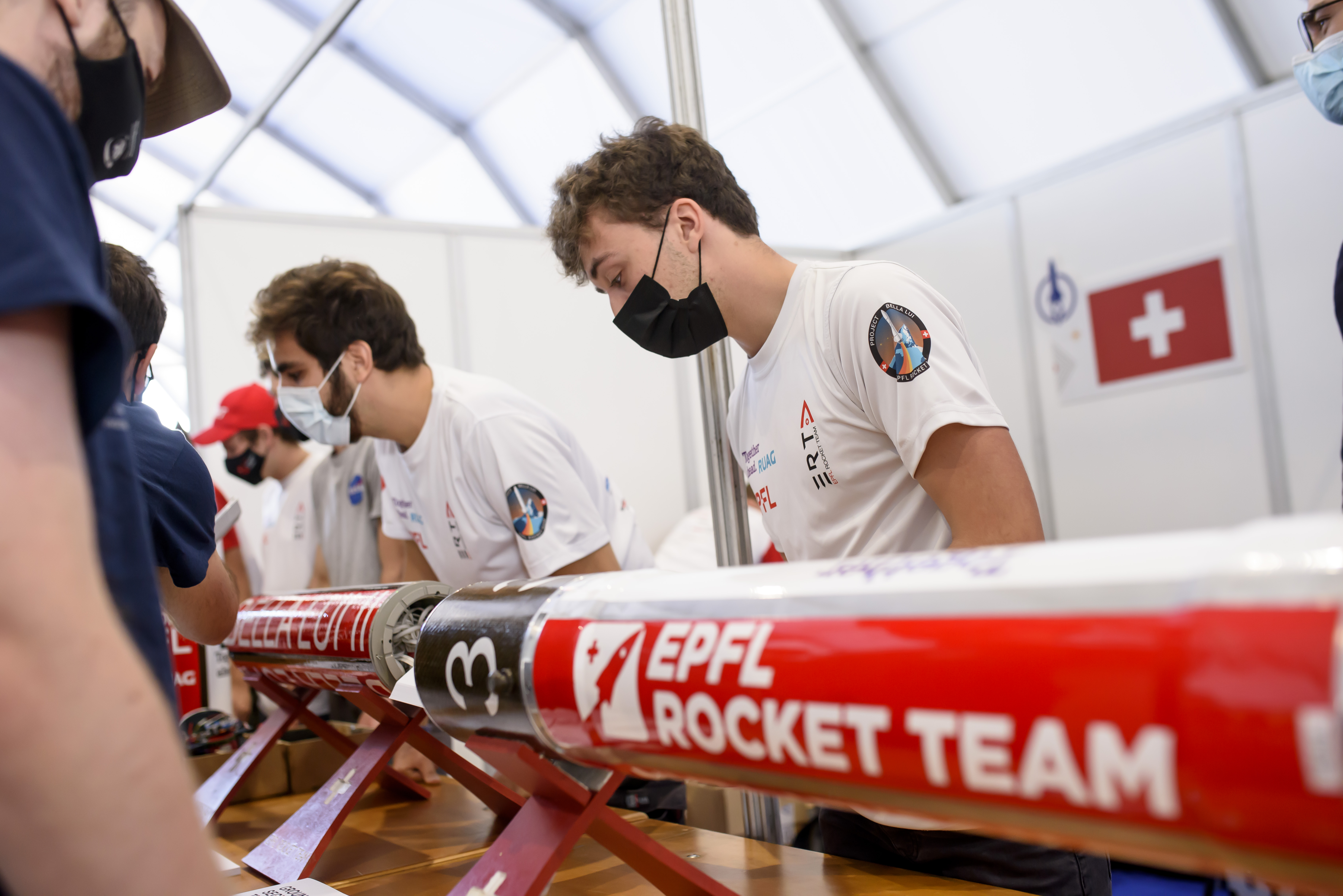
Members of the EPFL Rocket Team preparing their rocket for launch during the 2021 EuRoC edition.

The European Rocketry Challenge (EuRoC) is an amateur rocketry competition for teams from European academic institutions, hosted annually by the Portuguese Space Agency. The event aims to foster education and innovation in aerospace engineering, and other fields, by allowing students to demonstrate their self-built rockets.

The EuRoC was launched in 2020, as a way to support students preparing for other competition of this kind, whose plans were disrupted by border closures due to the COVID-19 pandemic. With the European Rocketry Challenge, the Portuguese Space Agency (Agência Espacial Portuguesa) aims to promote space technology and cooperation between European universities and research institutions in Europe.

== The Competition ==
As a competition, the EuRoC involves various challenges in which teams have to design, build and launch rockets. The tasks may vary from year to year, but they are designed to require technical development from the students. Participants not only have to develop a working rocket, but also fulfill certain objectives, such as reaching a certain altitude (3 km or 9 km) and carrying a payload to perform scientific experiments during the flight.

Rockets are built from a variety of materials including wood, aluminium, PA-12 and glass fibre composite.

== Categories and Competitions ==
Participants compete in various categories, depending on the target altitude of their rockets and the complexity of their designs. The launches are divided into two altitude categories, each further subdivided based on the type of propellant used (liquid, solid, or hybrid):

- 3,000 metres altitude
- 9,000 metres altitude

Teams are evaluated based on criteria such as rocket performance, accuracy in reaching the intended altitude, innovation in design, and operational safety.

== Competition History ==
The EuRoC was held for the first time 21 to 24 October 2020 in Ponte de Sor (Portugal), during the COVID-19 pandemic. Since then, the competition has grown steadily, with around 600 students and over 20 teams participating annually.

=== EuRoC 2020 ===
The inaugural edition featured six teams and approximately 120 students.

- Air ESIEA
- Copenhagen Suborbitals (DanStar)
- Project EULER
- Space Team Aachen
- TU Wien Space Team (The Hound and STR-10)

=== EuRoC 2021 ===
19 teams with 400 students from 12 European countries took part in the competition.

- 2Space
- Aerospace Team Graz (Technical Award)
- AGH Space Systems
- Akademische Raumfahrtinitiative Schweiz (Hybrid 9Km Flight Award)
- Aristotle Space & Aeronautics Team (A.S.A.T.)
- Bath University Rocket Team
- CranSEDS
- DanSTAR (Liquid 9Km Flight Award)
- Delft Aerospace Rocket Engineering
- endeavour
- EPFL Rocket Team (EuRoC Award | Hybrid 3Km Flight Award)
- Imperial College London Rocketry (ICLR)
- PoliWRocket (Design Award)
- Propulse NTNU (Solid 9Km Flight Award)
- RED - Rocket Experiment Division
- SimLE SimBa
- Skyward Experimental Rocketry (Solid-3Km Flight Award | Team Award)
- Space Team Aachen

There were 15 launches.

=== EuRoC 2022 ===
The 2022 edition of EuRoC saw the participation of 25 university teams, comprising a total of 600 students from across Europe. The paddock and preparation area were located at Ponte de Sor Aerodrome, while rocket launches were conducted at the Santa Margarida Military Camp.

- Aerospace Team Graz - ASTG (New Space Award and Team Award)
- Akademische Raumfahrtinitiative Schweiz - ARIS
- Aristotle Space & Aeronautics Team - ASAT
- Bath Rocket Team - BRT
- BME Aerospace - BMEAERO
- BME Suborbitals - BMESUB
- CranSEDS
- Endeavour (Payload Award)
- EPFL Rocket Team - ERT (Solid Engine 9 000 meters Award)
- Faraday Rocketry UPV
- Fénix Rocket Team - Fénix
- Hybrid Engine Development - HyEnD
- Imperial College London Rocketry - ICLR
- LeoFly - LF
- PoliWRocket
- Rocket Experiment Division - RED (Solid Engine 3 000 meters Award)
- Skyward Experimental Rocketry - Skyward ER (EuRoC Award)
- Student Team for Aerospace and Rocketry - STAR
- TU Wien Space Team - TUST (Liquid Engine 3 000 meters Award)

Out of the teams selected, 16 achieved successful launches.

=== EuRoC 2023 ===
The competition took place from 10 to 16 October 2023 with 25 teams in Constância, and 13 successful launches.

- Aerospace Team Graz (EuRoc Award & H3 Flight Award)
- TU Wien Space Team
- CTU Space Research
- Danish Student Association for Rocketry
- Air ESIEA
- Association for Space Technologies & Research Applications
- WARR Rocketry
- Aristotle Space & Aeronautics Team
- PoliTo Rocket Team
- Skyward Experimental Rocketry
- Propulse NTNU
- PUT Rocketlab
- North Space
- Rocket Experiment Division (Payload Award)
- Faraday Rocketry UPV (S3 Flight Award)
- Student Team for Aerospace and Rocketry
- Association of Engineering Students in Rocketry
- Akademische Raumfahrt Initiative Schweiz
- EPFL Rocket Team
- HyPower Bristol
- Imperial College London Rocketry

=== EuRoC 2024 ===
The event took place at Ponte de Sor Aerodrome and Santa Margarida Military Camp in Constância between 9 and 15 October. Awards were issued for technical report, vehicle design, team effort, flight performance (multiple categories), payload and overall ranking.

- Aerospace Team Graz (H9 Flight Award & Design Award & Technical Award)
- Association of Engineering Students in Rocketry
- Bath Rocket Team
- PoliWRocket
- Porto Space Team
- Skyward Experimental Rocketry (EuRoc Award & H3 Flight Award)
- AGH Space Systems
- HyPower Bristol
- Imperial College London Rocketry
- Projekt Sunride
- TU Wien Space Team
- WARR Rocketry (L3 Flight Award & Payload Award & Team Award)
- BiSKY Team
- BME Suborbitals
- Ignite UiT
- PoliTo Rocket Team
- Student Team for Aerospace and Rocketry
- TU Darmstadt Space Technology
- University of Limerick Aeronautical Society High-Powered Rocketry
- USN Horizon
- ALS Rocketry Club
- Delft Aerospace Rocket Engineering (S9 Flight Award)
- ICARUS PoliTo DART
- Laboratorio para Experimentacion en el Espacio y Microgravedad
- Rocket Experiment Division (S3 Flight Award)

=== EuRoC 2025 ===
The competition took place in Constancia and Santa Margarida Military Camp. 28 teams all over Europe participated.

- ASPiRE – Aerospace Research Engineering Greece (Payload Award)
- ASTG – Aerospace Team Graz (EuRoC Award & H9 Flight Award)
- ARIS – Akademische Raumfahrt Initiative Schweiz
- ASAT – Aristotle Space & Aeronautics Team
- ÆSIR – Association of Engineering Students in Rocketry
- Aurora – Aurora Rocketry
- BRT – Bath Rocket Team
- BEARS – Berlin Experimental Astronautics Research Student Team e.V.
- BME Suborbitals – BME Suborbitals (Team Award & Technical Award)
- CTU – CTU Space Research
- DanSTAR – Danish Student Association for Rocketry
- DARE – Delft Aerospace Rocket Engineering
- ERT – EPFL Rocket Team
- FRUPV – Faraday Rocketry UPV (S3 Flight Award)
- HyEnd – Hybrid Engine Development (L3 Flight Award)
- HPB – HyPower Bristol
- Ignite – Ignite UiT
- ICLR – Imperial College London Rocketry
- NS – North Space
- PoliW – PoliWRocket
- PST – Porto Space Team FEUP
- RED – Rocket Experiment Division
- SKY – Skyward Experimental Rocketry (Design Award)
- SKA Rocketry – Students’ Space Association Rocketry
- TUDSaT – TU Darmstadt Space Technology
- TUST – TU Wien Space Team
- UM Rocketry – UM Rocketry
- WARR – Wissenschaftliche Arbeitsgemeinschaft für Raketentechnik und Raumfahrt

=== EuRoC 2026 ===
The seventh edition took place in Constancia and Santa Margarida Military Camp. 21 teams all over Europe participated.

The American astrophysicist Neil deGrasse Tyson, who was in Portugal to present his latest book and to record an episode of his podcast StarTalk. In his address he recalled how the Apollo missions changed the way people look at the Earth, and compared the students to the navigators who opened new sea routes.

Aerospace Team Graz won the EuRoC Award for the third time, after 2023 and 2025, with its liquid-propellant rocket HARPIA, which reached an officially recorded altitude of 9,196 metres.

The official team list named 21 teams:

- ASTG – Aerospace Team Graz (EuRoC Award & L9 Flight Award)
- AnTARES – Aerospace Technology and Rocketry Engineering Studentteam
- ARIS – Akademische Raumfahrt Initiative Schweiz (Technical Award)
- BME Suborbitals – BME Suborbitals (Team Award)
- Coheteros – Coheteros
- CTU – CTU Space Research (H3 Flight Award)
- ERT – EPFL Rocket Team
- HyEnD – Hybrid Engine Development
- ICLR – Imperial College London Rocketry
- LEEM-UPM – Laboratorio para Experimentación en Espacio y Microgravedad (S3 Flight Award)
- MAST – Minho Aerospace Students' Team
- PoliW – PWr in Space
- RED – Rocket Experiment Division
- SKA – SKA Rocketry
- SKY – Skyward Experimental Rocketry (Design Award & L3 Flight Award)
- STA – Space Team Aachen
- StarPi – StarPi Rocketry Team
- TUDSaT – TU Darmstadt Space Technology
- UMR – UM Rocketry
- White Noise – White Noise (Payload Award & Rookie of the Year)
- WARR – Wissenschaftliche Arbeitsgemeinschaft für Raketentechnik und Raumfahrt
