= Airbus Sagitta =

Research aircraft developed by Airbus

Sagitta
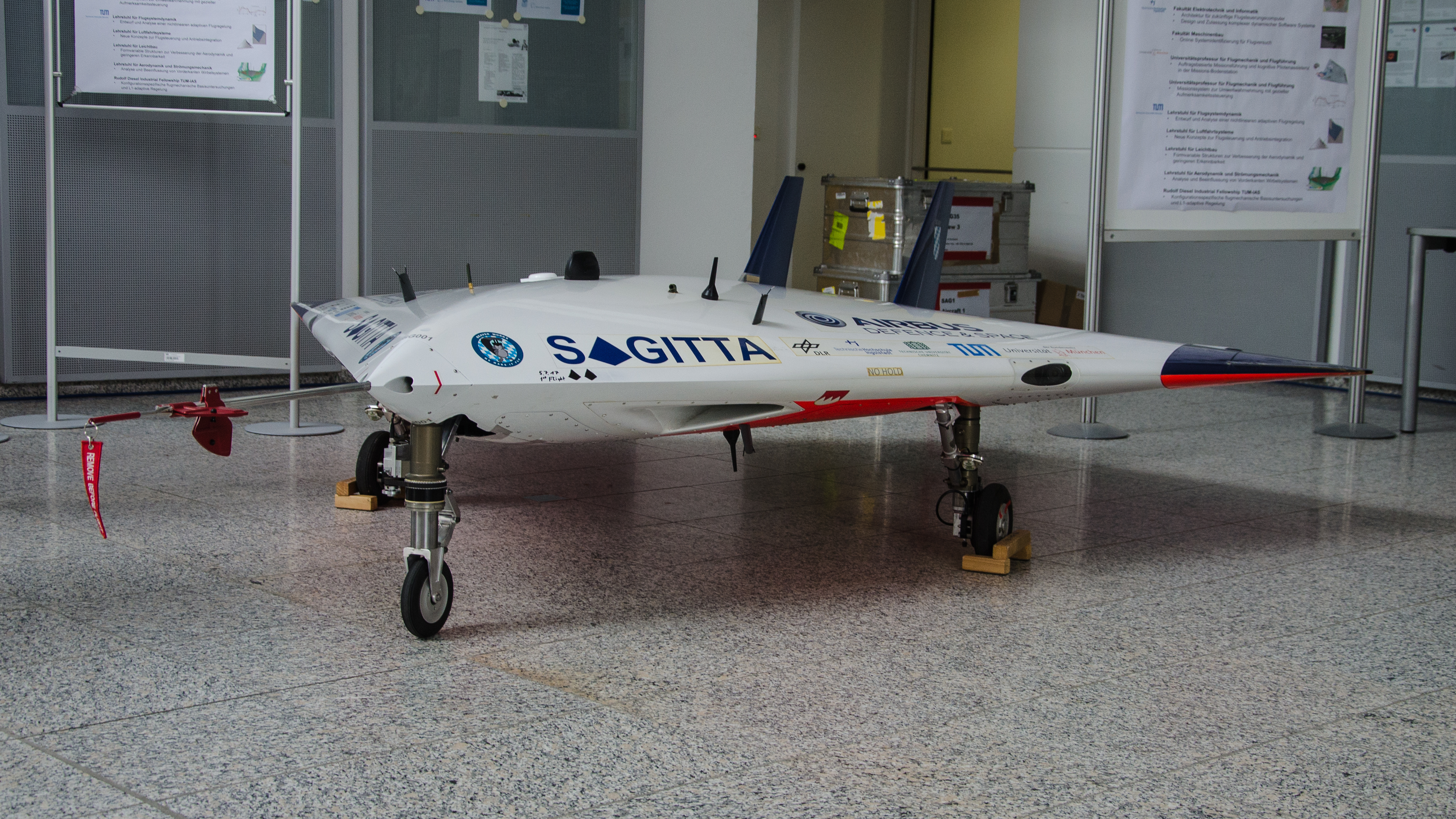
- Sagitta at DLRK 2017

General information
- Type: Research aircraft
- National origin: Germany
- Manufacturer: Airbus Defence and Space, DLR, THI, TUC, TUM, UniBw
- Status: in flight test

History
- First flight: 5 July 2017

The Airbus Sagitta from Airbus Defence and Space is a jet powered UAV research demonstrator, developed in cooperation with German research institutes as part of the Open Innovation initiative.

== History ==
The goal of the open innovation program is the advancement of the continuous exchange between industry and research institutes in the area of technologies for unmanned aerial vehicles. In 2010 research studies were launched at the academic partner institutes at Chemnitz University of Technology and the Technical University of Munich, the University of the Bundeswehr Munich, the technical university Ingolstadt and at the German Aerospace Center (DLR) in Braunschweig and Oberpfaffenhofen. All partners designed and built unmanned research aircraft to demonstrate technologies out of the research programme. The first flight took place 5 July 2017 at the Denel Overberg Test Range in South Africa.

== Development ==
All subsystems were developed and built by partners. Final integration and testing took place at the military aircraft centre of Airbus in Manching, Bavaria, Germany.

== Design ==
The unmanned aircraft has a wingspan and length of approximately 3,00m and a maximum mass of 150 kg. It is powered by two BF-300F jet engines from BF Turbines with 300 N thrust each. It offers space for several experiments.

The pitch, roll and yaw control surfaces are actuated by electric actuators (fly-by-wire). The landing gear is retracted electrically. The flight control system consist of a flight control computer, a navigation unit (differential GPS and INS) and an air data system. A mission computer is installed to manage and execute mission tasks. The flight and the mission are controlled by a ground control station.

The aircraft communicates via multiple data links. Flights are fully automatic, including take-off and landing (ATOL).

== See also ==
Aircraft of comparable role, configuration, and era

- EADS Barracuda
- BAE Systems Taranis
- Dassault nEUROn
- General Atomics MQ-9 Reaper
- Lockheed Martin RQ-3 DarkStar
- BAE Systems Corax

== Sources ==
- Successful first flight of UAV demonstrator SAGITTA, Airbus Press release
- SAGITTA meistert erfolgreich Erstflug, DLR Pressemeldung
- Erfolgreicher Erstflug von Sagitta, Flugrevue
- Experimental investigations on vortex flow phenomena of a diamond wing configuration, A. Hövelmann, C. Breitsamter
- Propulsion System Integration and Thrust Vectoring Aspects for Scaled Jet UAS, Bougas, L. & Hornung, M. CEAS Aeronaut J (2013) 4: 327.
- Unsteady Aerodynamics of the Sagitta Flying Wing Configuration, S.Pfnür, C. Breitsamter
- Design Process and Manufacturing of an Unmanned Blended Wing-body Aircraft, B. Gramüller, F. Stroscher, J. Schmidt, T. Ungwattanapanit, T. Löbl, M. Hanke
- Design of the general systems for the SAGITTA demonstrator UAV, A. Bierig, F. Nikodem, P. Gallun, C. Greiner-Perth, 2017 ICUAS
- Design of a retractable landing gear for the SAGITTA demonstrator UAV, F. Nikodem, F. Möller, P. Gallun, A. Bierig, DLR, DLRK 2017
