= Rocketry =

Rocketry may refer to:

== Science and technology ==
- The design and construction of rockets
  - The hobbyist or (semi-)professional use of model rockets
- Aerospace engineering, also known as rocket science
- Amateur rocketry, a hobby in which participants experiment with fuels or custom rocket motors
- High-power rocketry, a hobby similar to model rocketry that includes high-powered rockets

== Other uses ==
- Rocketry: The Nambi Effect, a 2022 Indian biographical drama film
