= RS-25 =

Space Shuttle and SLS main engine

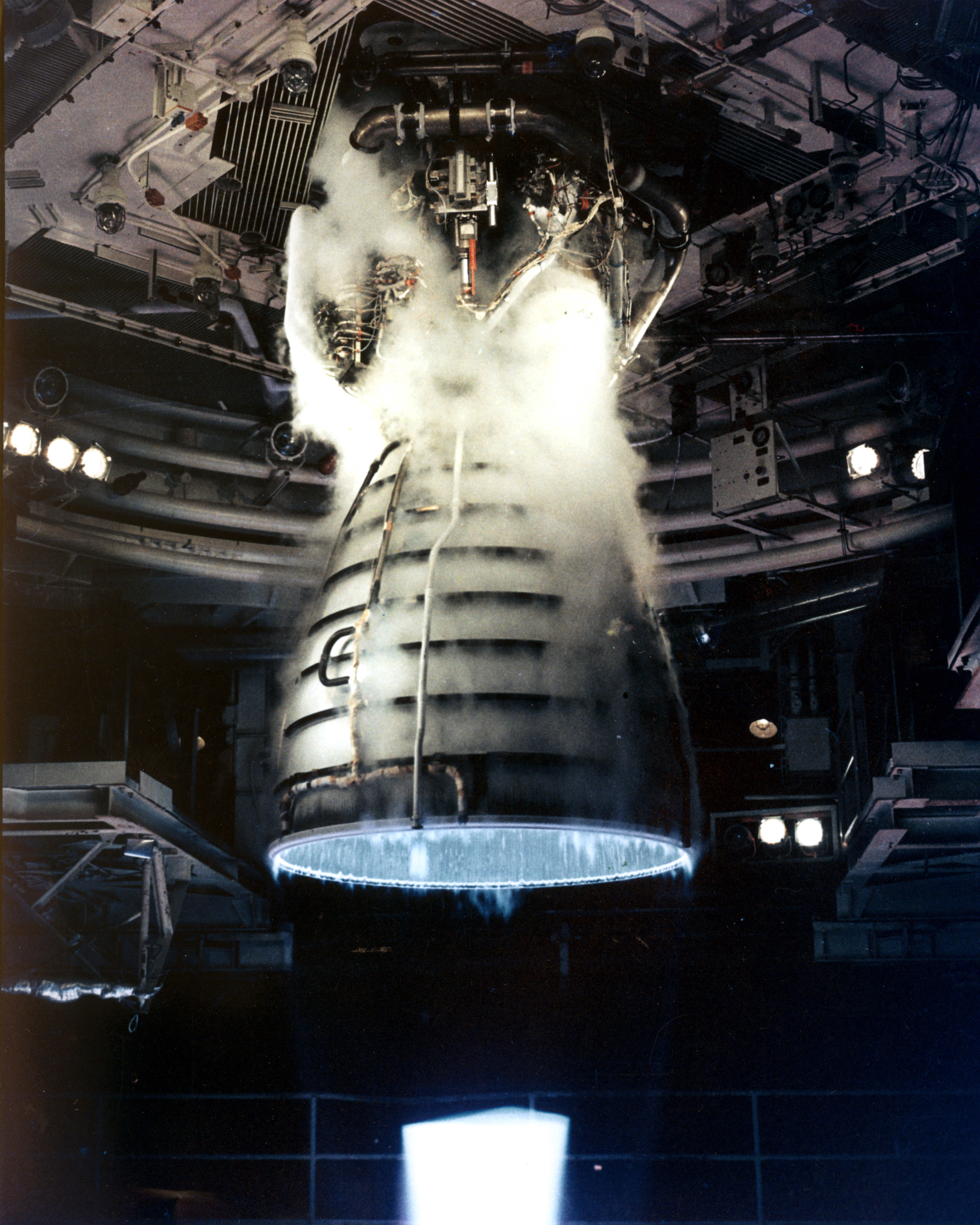
- RS-25 test firing. The bright area at the bottom of the picture is a shock diamond.
- Country of origin: United States
- First flight: April 12, 1981 (STS-1)
- Designer: Rocketdyne
- Manufacturer: Rocketdyne (1972–2005); Pratt & Whitney Rocketdyne (2005–2013); Aerojet Rocketdyne (2013–2026); L3Harris Missile Solutions (2026-present
- Associated LV: Space Shuttle; Space Launch System
- Predecessor: HG-3
- Status: In use

Liquid-fuel engine
- Propellant: LOX / LH_{2}
- Mixture ratio: 6.03:1
- Cycle: Fuel-rich dual-shaft staged combustion

Configuration
- Nozzle ratio: 78:1

Performance
- Thrust, vacuum: 2,279 kN (512,300 lbf)
- Thrust, sea-level: 1,860 kN (418,000 lbf)
- Throttle range: 67–109%
- Thrust-to-weight ratio: 73.1
- Chamber pressure: 2,994 psi (20.64 MPa)
- Specific impulse, vacuum: 452.3 s (4.436 km/s)
- Specific impulse, sea-level: 366 s (3.59 km/s)
- Mass flow: 514.49 kg/s (1,134.26 lb/s)

Dimensions
- Length: 4.3 m (168 in)
- Diameter: 2.4 m (96 in)
- Dry mass: 3,177 kg (7,004 lb)

References
- Notes: Data is for RS-25D at 109% of rated power level.

The RS-25, also known as the Space Shuttle Main Engine (SSME), is a liquid-fuel cryogenic rocket engine that was used on NASA's Space Shuttle and is used on the Space Launch System.

Designed and manufactured in the United States by Rocketdyne (later Pratt & Whitney Rocketdyne and Aerojet Rocketdyne), the RS-25 burns cryogenic (very low temperature) liquid hydrogen and liquid oxygen propellants, with each engine producing 1,859 kN (418,000 lb_{f}) thrust at liftoff. Although RS-25 heritage traces back to the 1960s, its concerted development began in the 1970s with the first flight, STS-1, on April 12, 1981. The RS-25 has undergone upgrades over its operational history to improve the engine's thrust, reliability, safety, and maintenance load.

The engine produces a specific impulse (I_{sp}) of 452 seconds (4.43 kN⋅s/kg) in vacuum, or 366 seconds (3.59 kN⋅s/kg) at sea level, has a mass of approximately 3.5 tonnes (7,700 pounds), and is capable of throttling between 67% and 109% of its rated power level in one-percent increments. Components of the RS-25 operate at temperatures ranging from −253 to 3,300 °C (−400 to 6,000 °F).

The Space Shuttle used a cluster of three RS-25 engines mounted at the stern of the orbiter, with fuel drawn from the external tank. The engines were used for propulsion throughout the spacecraft ascent, with total thrust increased by two solid rocket boosters and the orbiter's two AJ10 orbital maneuvering system engines. Following each flight, the RS-25 engines were removed from the orbiter, inspected, refurbished, and then reused on another mission.

Four RS-25 engines are installed on each Space Launch System, housed in the engine section at the base of the core stage, and expended after use. The first four Space Launch System flights use modernized and refurbished engines built for the Space Shuttle program. Subsequent flights will make use of a simplified RS-25E engine called the Production Restart, which is under testing and development.

== Components ==
RS-25 schematic

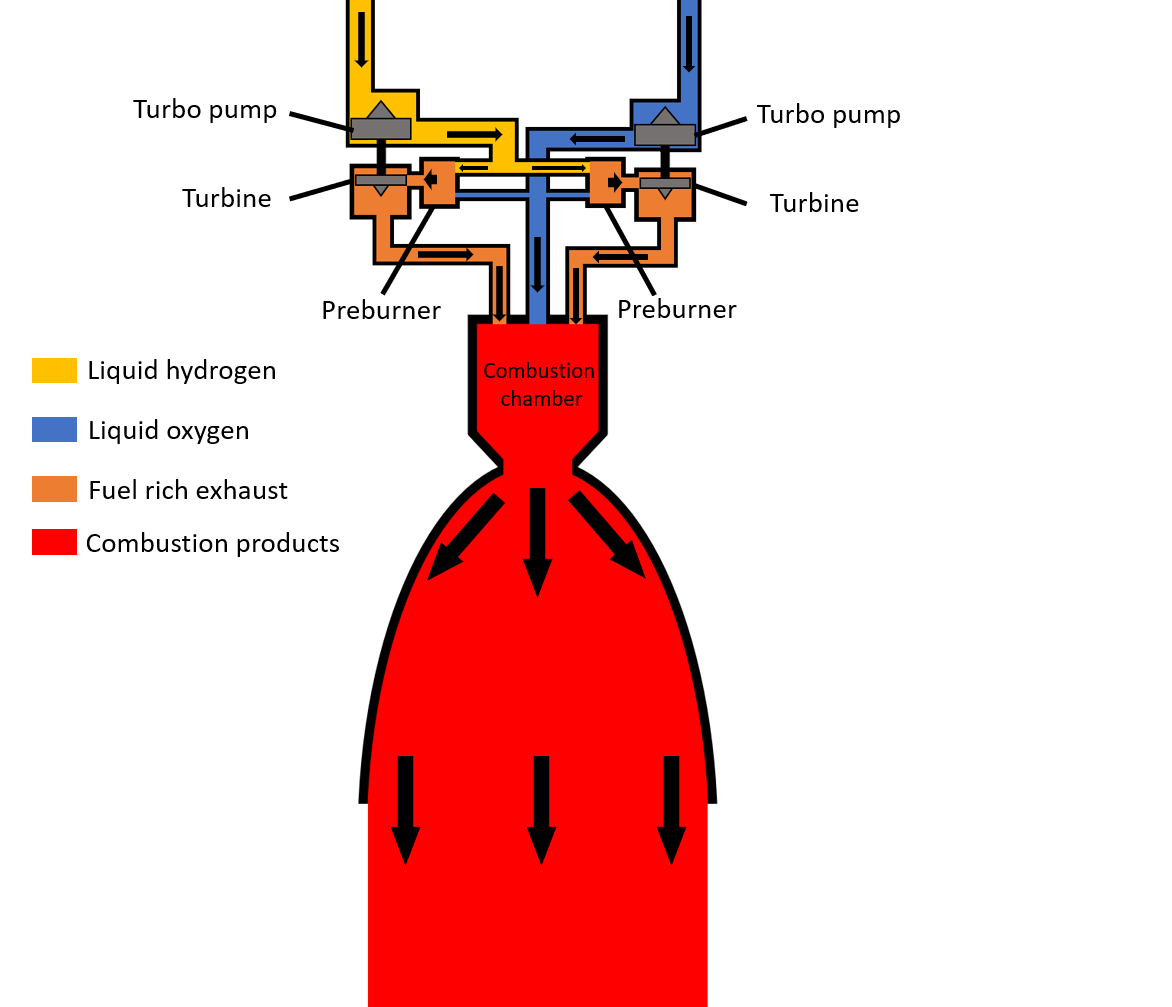
Simplified diagram of RS-25

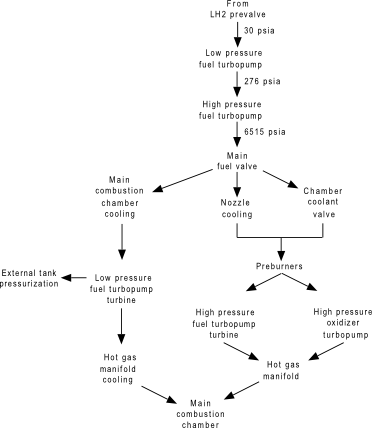
Fuel flow

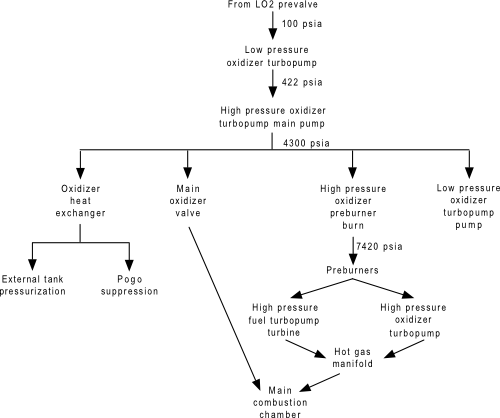
Oxidizer flow

RS-25 propellant flow

The RS-25 engine consists of pumps, valves, and other components working in concert to produce thrust. Fuel (liquid hydrogen) and oxidizer (liquid oxygen) from the Space Shuttle's external tank entered the orbiter at the umbilical disconnect valves and from there flowed through the orbiter's main propulsion system (MPS) feed lines; whereas in the Space Launch System (SLS), fuel and oxidizer from the rocket's core stage flow directly into the MPS lines. Once in the MPS lines, the fuel and oxidizer each branch out into separate paths to each engine (three on the Space Shuttle, four on the SLS). In each branch, pre-valves then allow the propellants to enter the engine.

Once in the engine, the propellants flow through low-pressure fuel and oxidizer turbopumps (LPFTP and LPOTP), and from there into high-pressure turbopumps (HPFTP and HPOTP). From these HPTPs the propellants take different routes through the engine. The oxidizer is split into four separate paths: to the oxidizer heat exchanger, which then splits into the oxidizer tank pressurization and pogo suppression systems; to the low-pressure oxidizer turbopump (LPOTP); to the high-pressure oxidizer pre-burner, from which it is split into the HPFTP turbine and HPOTP before being reunited in the hot gas manifold and sent on to the main combustion chamber (MCC); or directly into the main combustion chamber (MCC) injectors.

Meanwhile, fuel flows through the main fuel valve into regenerative cooling systems for the nozzle and MCC, or through the chamber coolant valve. The fuel passing through the MCC cooling system then passes back through the LPFTP turbine before being routed either to the fuel tank pressurization system or to the hot gas manifold cooling system (from where it passes into the MCC). Fuel in the nozzle cooling and chamber coolant valve systems is then sent via pre-burners into the HPFTP turbine and HPOTP before being reunited again in the hot gas manifold, from where it passes into the MCC injectors. Once in the injectors, the propellants are mixed and injected into the main combustion chamber where they are ignited. The ejection of the burning propellant mixture through the throat and bell of the engine's nozzle creates the thrust.

=== Turbopumps ===
==== Oxidizer system ====
The low-pressure oxidizer turbopump (LPOTP) is an axial-flow pump which operates at approximately 5,150 rpm driven by a six-stage turbine powered by high-pressure liquid oxygen from the high-pressure oxidizer turbopump (HPOTP). It boosts the liquid oxygen's pressure from 0.7 to 2.9 MPa (100 to 420 psi), with the flow from the LPOTP then being supplied to the HPOTP. During engine operation, the pressure boost permits the high-pressure oxidizer pump to operate at high speeds without cavitating. The LPOTP, which measures approximately 450 by 450 mm (18 by 18 in), is connected to the vehicle propellant ducting and supported in a fixed position by being mounted on the launch vehicle's structure.

Then, mounted before the HPOTP, is the pogo oscillation suppression system accumulator. For use, it is pre-and post-charged with He and charged with gaseous O_{2} from the heat exchanger, and, not having any membrane, it operates by continuously recirculating the charge gas. A number of baffles of various types are present inside the accumulator to control sloshing and turbulence, which is useful of itself and also to prevent the escape of gas into the low-pressure oxidizer duct to be ingested in the HPOTP.

The HPOTP consists of two single-stage centrifugal pumps (the main pump and a pre-burner pump) mounted on a common shaft and driven by a two-stage, hot-gas turbine. The main pump boosts the liquid oxygen's pressure from 2.9 to 30 MPa (420 to 4,350 psi) while operating at approximately 28,120 rpm, giving a power output of 23,260 hp (17.34 MW). The HPOTP discharge flow splits into several paths, one of which drives the LPOTP turbine. Another path is to, and through, the main oxidizer valve and enters the main combustion chamber. Another small flow path is tapped off and sent to the oxidizer heat exchanger. The liquid oxygen flows through an anti-flood valve that prevents it from entering the heat exchanger until sufficient heat is present for the heat exchanger to utilize the heat contained in the gases discharged from the HPOTP turbine, converting the liquid oxygen to gas. The gas is sent to a manifold and then routed to pressurize the liquid oxygen tank. Another path enters the HPOTP second-stage pre-burner pump to boost the liquid oxygen's pressure from 30 to 51 MPa (4,300 psia to 7,400 psia). It passes through the oxidizer pre-burner oxidizer valve into the oxidizer pre-burner and through the fuel pre-burner oxidizer valve into the fuel pre-burner. The HPOTP measures approximately 600 by 900 mm (24 by 35 in). It is attached by flanges to the hot-gas manifold.

The HPOTP turbine and HPOTP pumps are mounted on a common shaft. Mixing of the fuel-rich hot gases in the turbine section and the liquid oxygen in the main pump can create a hazard and, to prevent this, the two sections are separated by a cavity that is continuously purged by the engine's helium supply during engine operation. Two seals minimize leakage into the cavity; one seal is located between the turbine section and the cavity, while the other is between the pump section and cavity. Loss of helium pressure in this cavity results in automatic engine shutdown.

==== Fuel system ====
The low-pressure fuel turbopump (LPFTP) is an axial-flow pump driven by a two-stage turbine powered by gaseous hydrogen. It boosts the pressure of the liquid hydrogen from 30 to 276 psia (0.2 to 1.9 MPa) and supplies it to the high-pressure fuel turbopump (HPFTP). During engine operation, the pressure boost provided by the LPFTP permits the HPFTP to operate at high speeds without cavitating. The LPFTP operates at around 16,185 rpm, and is approximately 450 by 600 mm (18 by 24 in) in size. It is connected to the vehicle propellant ducting and is supported in a fixed position by being mounted to the launch vehicle's structure.

The HPFTP is a three-stage centrifugal pump driven by a two-stage hot-gas turbine. It boosts the pressure of the liquid hydrogen from 1.9 to 45 MPa (276 to 6,515 psia), and operates at approximately 35,360 rpm with a power of 71,140 hp (53.05 MW). The discharge flow from the turbopump is routed to, and through, the main valve and is then split into three flow paths. One path is through the jacket of the main combustion chamber, where the hydrogen is used to cool the chamber walls. It is then routed from the main combustion chamber to the LPFTP, where it is used to drive the LPFTP turbine. A small portion of the flow from the LPFTP is then directed to a common manifold from all three engines to form a single path to the liquid hydrogen tank to maintain pressurization. The remaining hydrogen passes between the inner and outer walls of the hot-gas manifold to cool it and is then discharged into the main combustion chamber. A second hydrogen flow path from the main fuel valve is through the engine nozzle (to cool the nozzle). It then joins the third flow path from the chamber coolant valve. This combined flow is then directed to the fuel and oxidizer pre-burners. The HPFTP is approximately 550 by 1,100 mm (22 by 43 in) in size and is attached to the hot-gas manifold by flanges.

=== Powerhead ===
The large silver pipe across the top carries fuel from the low-pressure fuel turbopump (not visible) to the high-pressure fuel turbopump (HPFTP, silver drum at lower left). The top of the HPFTP is bolted to part of the hot gas manifold (black, with brown diagonal pipe), and above that is the fuel pre-burner (also black, with brown pipe entering at right).

==== Preburners ====
The oxidizer and fuel pre-burners are welded to the hot-gas manifold. The fuel and oxidizer enter the pre-burners and are mixed so that efficient combustion can occur. The augmented spark igniter is a small combination chamber located in the center of the injector of each pre-burner. Two dual-redundant spark igniters are activated by the engine controller and are used during the engine start sequence to initiate combustion in each pre-burner. They are turned off after approximately three seconds because the combustion process is then self-sustaining. The pre-burners produce the fuel-rich hot gases that pass through the turbines to generate the power needed to operate the high-pressure turbopumps. The oxidizer pre-burner's outflow drives a turbine that is connected to the HPOTP and to the oxidizer pre-burner pump. The fuel pre-burner's outflow drives a turbine that is connected to the HPFTP.

The speed of the HPOTP and HPFTP turbines depends on the position of the corresponding oxidizer and fuel pre-burner oxidizer valves. These valves are positioned by the engine controller, which uses them to throttle the flow of liquid oxygen to the pre-burners and, thus, control engine thrust. The oxidizer and fuel pre-burner oxidizer valves increase or decrease the liquid oxygen flow, thus increasing or decreasing pre-burner chamber pressure, HPOTP and HPFTP turbine speed, and liquid oxygen and gaseous hydrogen flow into the main combustion chamber, which increases or decreases engine thrust. The oxidizer and fuel pre-burner valves operate together to throttle the engine and maintain a constant 6.03:1 propellant mixture ratio.

The main oxidizer and main fuel valves control the flow of liquid oxygen and liquid hydrogen into the engine and are controlled by each engine controller. When an engine is operating, the main valves are fully open.

==== Main combustion chamber ====
The engine's main combustion chamber (MCC) receives fuel-rich hot gas from a hot-gas manifold cooling circuit. The gaseous hydrogen and liquid oxygen enter the chamber at the injector, which mixes the propellants. The mixture is ignited by the "Augmented Spark Igniter", an H_{2}/O_{2} flame at the center of the injector head. The main injector and dome assembly are welded to the hot-gas manifold, and the MCC is also bolted to the hot-gas manifold. The MCC comprises a structural shell made of Inconel 718 which is lined with a copper-silver-zirconium alloy called NARloy-Z, developed specifically for the RS-25 in the 1970s. Around 390 channels are machined into the liner wall to carry liquid hydrogen through the liner to provide MCC cooling, as the temperature in the combustion chamber reaches 3,300 °C (5,970 °F) during flight – higher than the boiling point of iron.

An alternative for the construction of RS-25 engines to be used in SLS missions is the use of advanced structural ceramics, such as thermal barrier coatings (TBCs) and ceramic-matrix composites (CMCs). These materials possess significantly lower thermal conductivities than metallic alloys, thus allowing more efficient combustion and reducing the cooling requirements. TBCs are thin ceramic oxide layers deposited on metallic components, acting as a thermal barrier between hot gaseous combustion products and the metallic shell. A TBC applied to the Inconel 718 shell during production could extend engine life and reduce cooling costs. Further, CMCs have been studied as a replacement for Ni-based superalloys and are composed of high-strength fibers (BN, C) continuously dispersed in a SiC matrix. An MCC composed of a CMC, though less studied and farther from fruition than the application of a TBC, could offer unprecedented levels of engine efficiency.

=== Nozzle ===
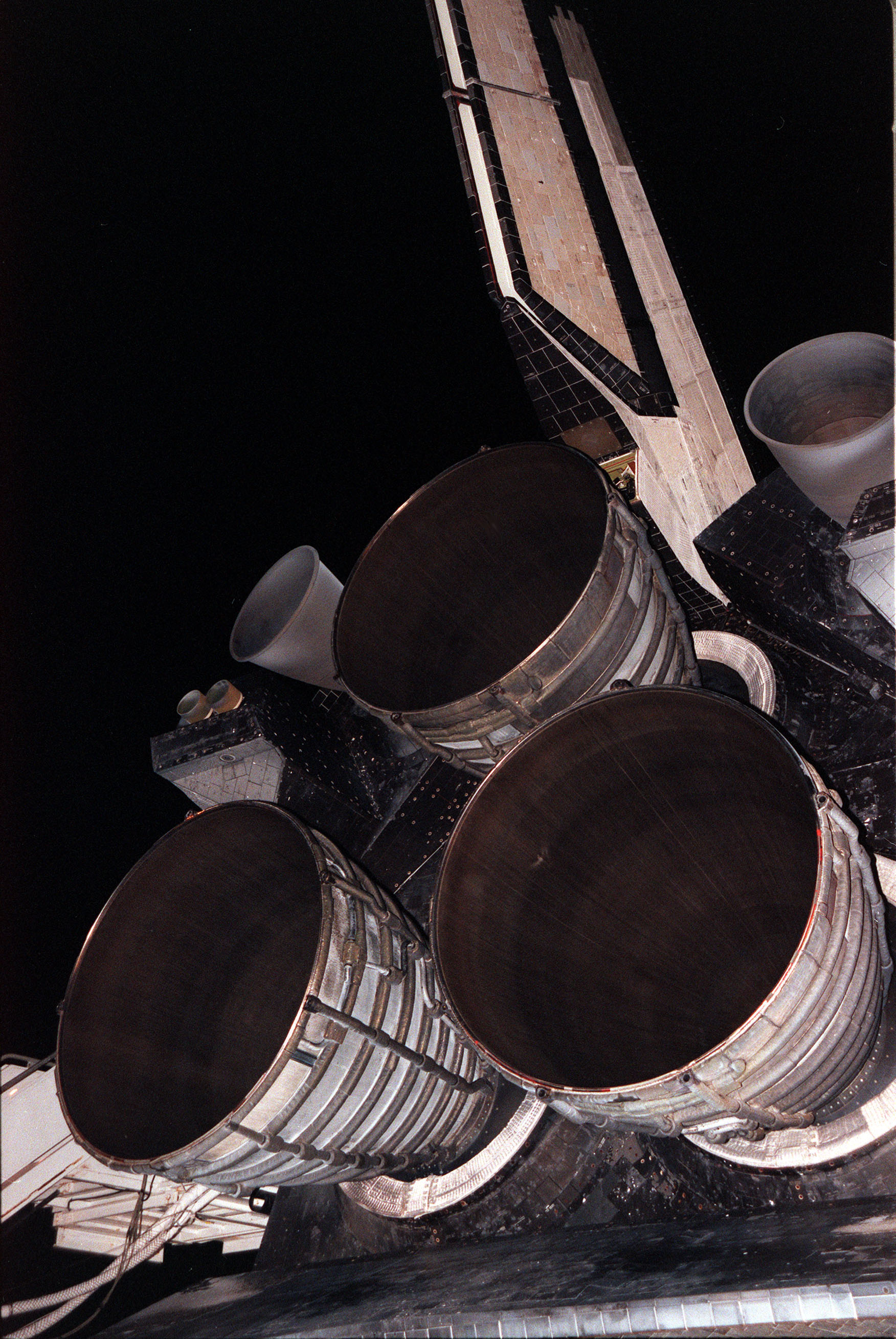
The nozzles of Space Shuttle Columbia's three RS-25s following the landing of STS-93. The bright spot in engine 3's nozzle (bottom right) is from damage that occurred during liftoff.

The engine's nozzle is 121 in (3.1 m) long with a diameter of 10.3 inches (0.26 m) at its throat and 90.7 inches (2.30 m) at its exit. The nozzle is a bell-shaped extension bolted to the main combustion chamber, referred to as a de Laval nozzle. The RS-25 nozzle has an unusually large expansion ratio (about 69:1) for the chamber pressure. At sea level, a nozzle of this ratio would normally undergo flow separation of the jet from the nozzle, which would cause control difficulties and could even mechanically damage the vehicle. However, to aid the engine's operation Rocketdyne engineers varied the angle of the nozzle walls from the theoretical optimum for thrust, reducing it near the exit. This raises the pressure just around the rim to an absolute pressure between 4.6 and 5.7 psi (32 and 39 kPa), and prevents flow separation. The inner part of the flow is at much lower pressure, around 2 psi (14 kPa) or less. The inner surface of each nozzle is cooled by liquid hydrogen flowing through brazed stainless steel tube wall coolant passages. On the Space Shuttle, a support ring welded to the forward end of the nozzle is the engine attach point to the orbiter-supplied heat shield. Thermal protection is necessary because of the exposure portions of the nozzles experience during the launch, ascent, on-orbit and entry phases of a mission. The insulation consists of four layers of metallic batting covered with a metallic foil and screening.

=== Controller ===
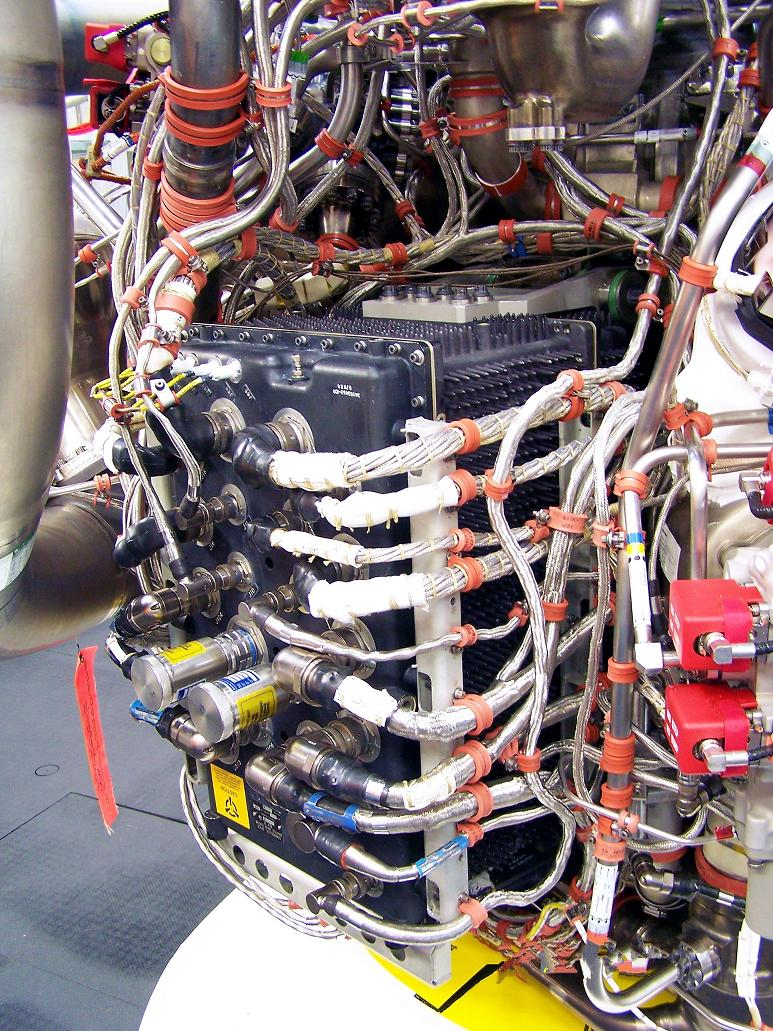
A Block II RS-25D main engine controller

Each engine is equipped with a main engine controller (MEC), an integrated computer which controls all of the engine's functions (through the use of valves) and monitors its performance. Built by Honeywell Aerospace, each MEC originally comprised two redundant Honeywell HDC-601 computers, later upgraded to a system composed of two doubly redundant Motorola 68000 (M68000) processors (for a total of four M68000s per controller). Having the controller installed on the engine itself greatly simplifies the wiring between the engine and the launch vehicle, because all the sensors and actuators are connected directly to only the controller, each MEC then being connected to the orbiter's general purpose computers (GPCs) or the SLS's avionics suite via its own engine interface unit (EIU). Using a dedicated system also simplifies the software and thus improves its reliability.

Two independent dual-CPU computers, A and B, form the controller; giving redundancy to the system. The failure of controller system A automatically leads to a switch-over to controller system B without impeding operational capabilities; the subsequent failure of controller system B would provide a graceful shutdown of the engine. Within each system (A and B), the two M68000s operate in lock-step, thereby enabling each system to detect failures by comparing the signal levels on the buses of the two M68000 processors within that system. If differences are encountered between the two buses, then an interrupt is generated and control turned over to the other system. Because of subtle differences between M68000s from Motorola and the second source manufacturer TRW, each system uses M68000s from the same manufacturer (for instance system A would have two Motorola CPUs while system B would have two CPUs manufactured by TRW). Memory for block I controllers was of the plated-wire type, which functions in a manner similar to magnetic core memory and retains data even after power is turned off. Block II controllers used conventional CMOS static RAM.

The controllers were designed to be tough enough to survive the forces of launch and proved to be extremely resilient to damage. During the investigation of the Challenger accident the two MECs (from engines 2020 and 2021), recovered from the seafloor, were delivered to Honeywell Aerospace for examination and analysis. One controller was broken open on one side, and both were severely corroded and damaged by marine life. Both units were disassembled and the memory units flushed with deionized water. After they were dried and vacuum baked, data from these units was retrieved for forensic examination.

==== Main valves ====
To control the engine's output, the MEC operates five hydraulically actuated propellant valves on each engine; the oxidizer pre-burner oxidizer, fuel pre-burner oxidizer, main oxidizer, main fuel, and chamber coolant valves. In an emergency, the valves can be fully closed by using the engine's helium supply system as a backup actuation system.

In the Space Shuttle, the main oxidizer and fuel bleed valves were used after shutdown to dump any residual propellant, with residual liquid oxygen venting through the engine and residual liquid hydrogen venting through the liquid hydrogen fill and drain valves. After the dump was completed, the valves closed and remained closed for the remainder of the mission.

A coolant control valve is mounted on the combustion chamber coolant bypass duct of each engine. The engine controller regulates the amount of gaseous hydrogen allowed to bypass the nozzle coolant loop, thus controlling its temperature. The chamber coolant valve is 100% open before the engine start. During engine operation, it is 100% open for throttle settings of 100 to 109%. For throttle settings between 65 and 100%, its position ranged from 66.4 to 100%.

=== Gimbal ===
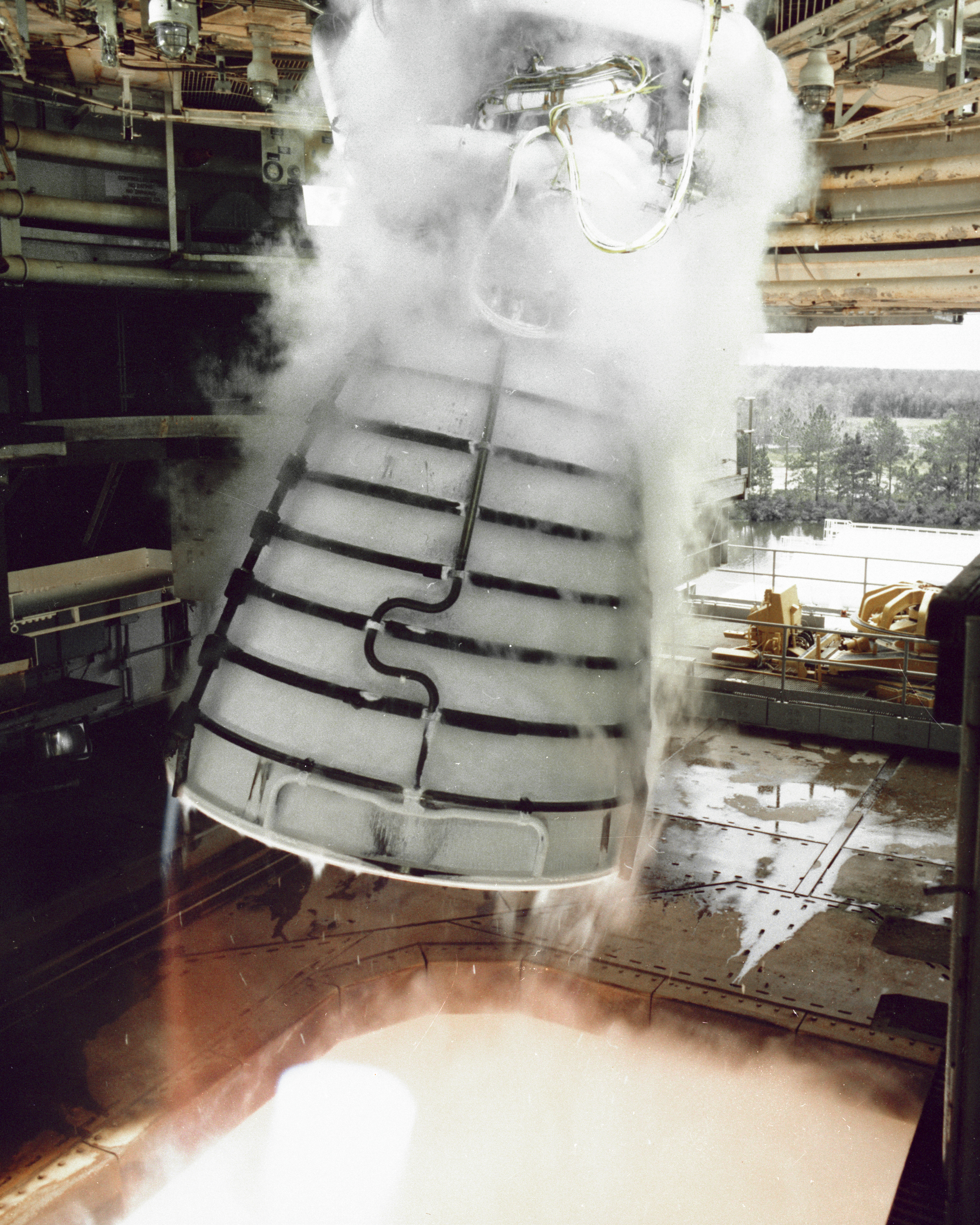
RS-25 gimbal test

External videos
- RS-25 gimbal test

Each engine is installed with a gimbal bearing, a universal ball and socket joint which is bolted to the launch vehicle by its upper flange and to the engine by its lower flange. It represents the thrust interface between the engine and the launch vehicle, supporting 7,480 lb (3,390 kg) of engine weight and withstanding over 500,000 lbf (2,200,000 N) of thrust. As well as providing a means to attach the engine to the launch vehicle, the gimbal bearing allows the engine to be pivoted (or "gimballed") around two axes of freedom with a range of ±10.5°. This motion allows the engine's thrust vector to be altered, thus steering the vehicle into the correct orientation. The comparatively large gimbal range is necessary to correct for the pitch momentum that occurs due to the constantly shifting center of mass as the vehicle burns fuel in flight and after booster separation. The bearing assembly is approximately 290 by 360 mm (11 by 14 in), has a mass of 105 lb (48 kg), and is made of titanium alloy.

The low-pressure oxygen and low-pressure fuel turbopumps were mounted 180° apart on the orbiter's aft fuselage thrust structure. The lines from the low-pressure turbopumps to the high-pressure turbopumps contain flexible bellows that enable the low-pressure turbopumps to remain stationary while the rest of the engine is gimbaled for thrust vector control, and also to prevent damage to the pumps when loads were applied to them. The liquid-hydrogen line from the LPFTP to the HPFTP is insulated to prevent the formation of liquid air.

=== Helium system ===
In addition to fuel and oxidizer systems, the launch vehicle's main propulsion system is also equipped with a helium system consisting of ten storage tanks in addition to various regulators, check valves, distribution lines, and control valves. The system is used in-flight to purge the engine and provides pressure for actuating engine valves within the propellant management system and during emergency shutdowns. During entry, on the Space Shuttle, any remaining helium was used to purge the engines during reentry and for repressurization.

== History ==
=== Development ===
RS-25 testing at Stennis Space Center in early 2015

The history of the RS-25 traces back to the 1960s when NASA's Marshall Space Flight Center and Rocketdyne were conducting a series of studies on high-pressure engines, developed from the successful J-2 engine used on the S-II and S-IVB upper stages of the Saturn V rocket during the Apollo program. The studies were conducted under a program to upgrade the Saturn V engines, which produced a design for a 350,000 lbf (1,600 kN) upper-stage engine known as the HG-3. As funding levels for Apollo wound down the HG-3 was cancelled as well as the upgraded F-1 engines already being tested. It was the design for the HG-3 that would form the basis for the RS-25.

Meanwhile, in 1967, the US Air Force funded a study into advanced rocket propulsion systems for use during Project Isinglass, with Rocketdyne asked to investigate aerospike engines and Pratt & Whitney (P&W) to research more efficient conventional de Laval nozzle-type engines. At the conclusion of the study, P&W put forward a proposal for a 250,000 lb_{f} engine called the XLR-129, which used a two-position expanding nozzle to provide increased efficiency over a wide range of altitudes.

In January 1969 NASA awarded contracts to General Dynamics, Lockheed, McDonnell Douglas, and North American Rockwell to initiate the early development of the Space Shuttle. As part of these 'Phase A' studies, the involved companies selected an upgraded version of the XLR-129, developing 415,000 lbf (1,850 kN), as the baseline engine for their designs. This design can be found on many of the planned Shuttle versions right up to the final decision. However, since NASA was interested in pushing the state of the art in every way they decided to select a much more advanced design in order to "force an advancement of rocket engine technology". They called for a new design based on a high-pressure combustion chamber running around 3,000 psi (21,000 kPa), which increases the performance of the engine.

Development began in 1970, when NASA released a request for proposal for 'Phase B' main engine concept studies, requiring development of a throttleable, staged combustion, de Laval-type engine. The request was based on the then-current design of the Space Shuttle which featured two reusable stages, the orbiter and a crewed fly-back booster, and required one engine which would be able to power both vehicles via two different nozzles (12 booster engines with 550,000 lbf (2,400 kN) sea level thrust each and 3 orbiter engines with 632,000 lbf (2,810 kN) vacuum thrust each). Rocketdyne, P&W and Aerojet General were selected to receive funding although, given P&W's already-advanced development (demonstrating a working 350,000 lbf (1,600 kN) concept engine during the year) and Aerojet General's prior experience in developing the 1,500,000 lbf (6,700 kN) M-1 engine, Rocketdyne was forced to put a large amount of private money into the design process to allow the company to catch up to its competitors.

By the time the contract was awarded, budgetary pressures meant that the shuttle's design had changed to its final orbiter, external tank, and two boosters configuration, and so the engine was only required to power the orbiter during ascent. During the year-long 'Phase B' study period, Rocketdyne was able to make use of their experience developing the HG-3 engine to design their SSME proposal, producing a prototype by January 1971. The engine made use of a new Rocketdyne-developed copper-zirconium alloy (called NARloy-Z) and was tested on February 12, 1971, producing a chamber pressure of 3,172 psi (21,870 kPa). The three participating companies submitted their engine development bids in April 1971, with Rocketdyne being awarded the contract on July 13, 1971—although work did not begin on engine development until March 31, 1972, due to a legal challenge from P&W.

Following the awarding of the contract, a preliminary design review was carried out in September 1972, followed by a critical design review in September 1976 after which the engine's design was set and construction of the first set of flight-capable engines began. A final review of all the Space Shuttle's components, including the engines, was conducted in 1979. The design reviews operated in parallel with several test milestones, initial tests consisting of individual engine components which identified shortcomings with various areas of the design, including the HPFTP, HPOTP, valves, nozzle, and fuel pre-burners. The individual engine component tests were followed by the first test of a complete engine (0002) on March 16, 1977, after its final assembly line was established in the main Rocketdyne factory in Canoga Park, Los Angeles. NASA specified that, prior to the Shuttle's first flight, the engines must have undergone at least 65,000 seconds of testing, a milestone that was reached on March 23, 1980, with the engine having undergone 110,253 seconds of testing by the time of STS-1 both on test stands at Stennis Space Center and installed on the Main Propulsion Test Article (MPTA). The first set of engines (2005, 2006 and 2007) was delivered to Kennedy Space Center in 1979 and installed on Columbia, before being removed in 1980 for further testing and reinstalled on the orbiter. The engines, which were of the first manned orbital flight (FMOF) configuration and certified for operation at 100% rated power level (RPL), were operated in a twenty-second flight readiness firing on February 20, 1981, and, after inspection, declared ready for flight.

=== Space Shuttle program ===
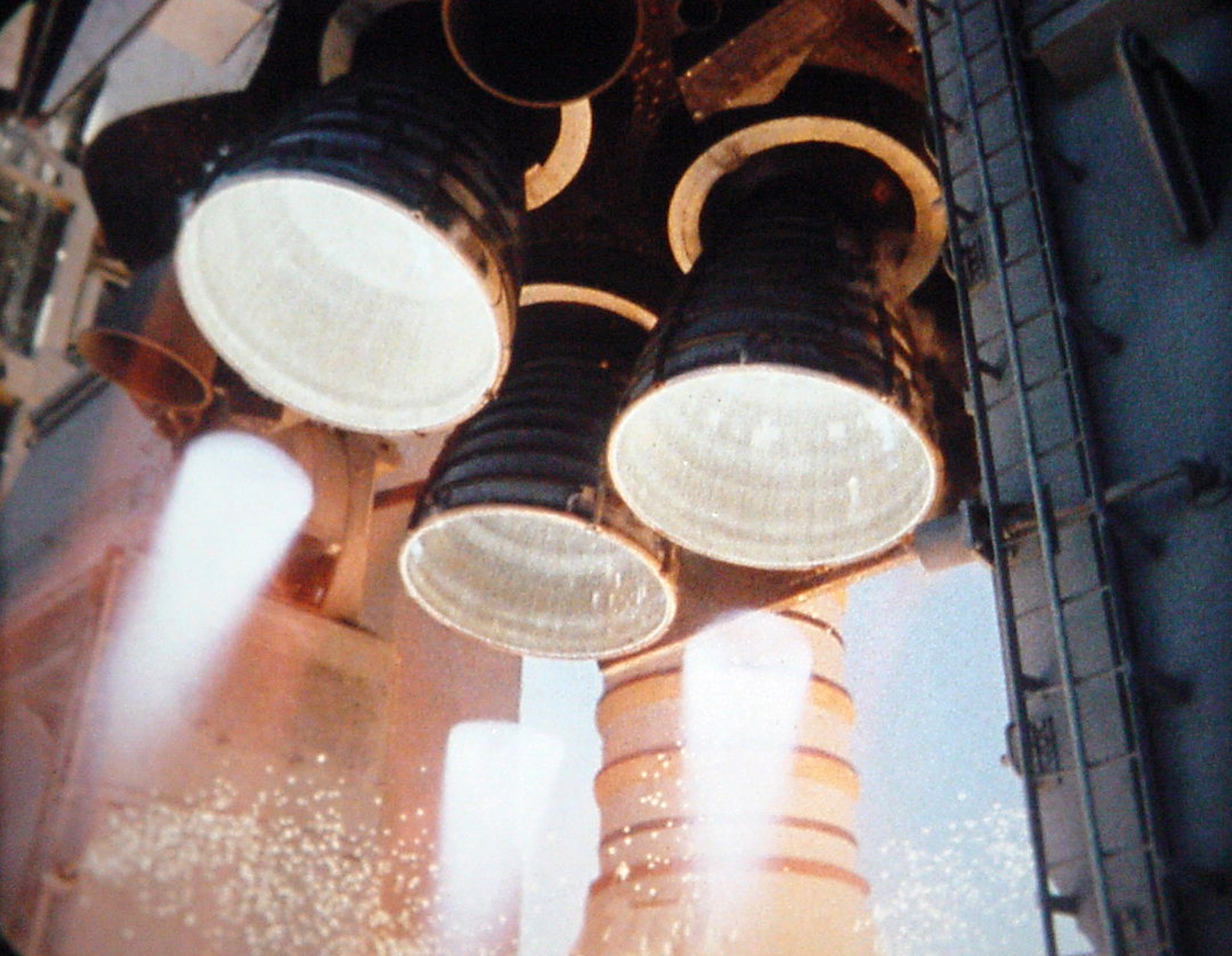
Space Shuttle Atlantis's three RS-25D main engines at liftoff during STS-110

SSME startup and shutdown sequences

Each Space Shuttle had three RS-25 engines, installed in the aft structure of the Space Shuttle orbiter in the Orbiter Processing Facility prior to the orbiter being transferred to the Vehicle Assembly Building. If necessary, the engines could be changed on the pad. The engines, drawing propellant from the Space Shuttle external tank (ET) via the orbiter's main propulsion system (MPS), were ignited at T−6.6 seconds prior to liftoff (with each ignition staggered by 120 ms), which allowed their performance to be checked prior to ignition of the Space Shuttle Solid Rocket Boosters (SRBs), which committed the shuttle to the launch. At launch, the engines would be operating at 100% RPL, throttling up to 104.5% immediately following liftoff. The engines would maintain this power level until around T+40 seconds, where they would be throttled back to around 70% to reduce aerodynamic loads on the shuttle stack as it passed through the region of maximum dynamic pressure, or max. q. (Note: The level of throttle was initially set to 65%, but, following review of early flight performance, this was increased to a minimum of 67% to reduce fatigue on the MPS. The throttle lever was dynamically calculated based on initial launch performance, generally being reduced to a level around 70%.) The engines would then be throttled back up until around T+8 minutes, at which point they would be gradually throttled back down to 67% to prevent the stack exceeding 3 g of acceleration as it became progressively lighter due to propellant consumption. The engines were then shut down, a procedure known as main engine cutoff (MECO), at around T+8.5 minutes.

After each flight the engines would be removed from the orbiter and transferred to the Space Shuttle Main Engine Processing Facility (SSMEPF), where they would be inspected and refurbished in preparation for reuse on a subsequent shuttle flight. A total of 46 reusable RS-25 engines, each costing around US$40 million, were flown during the Space Shuttle program, with each new or overhauled engine entering the flight inventory requiring flight qualification on one of the test stands at the Stennis Space Center prior to flight.

==== Upgrades ====
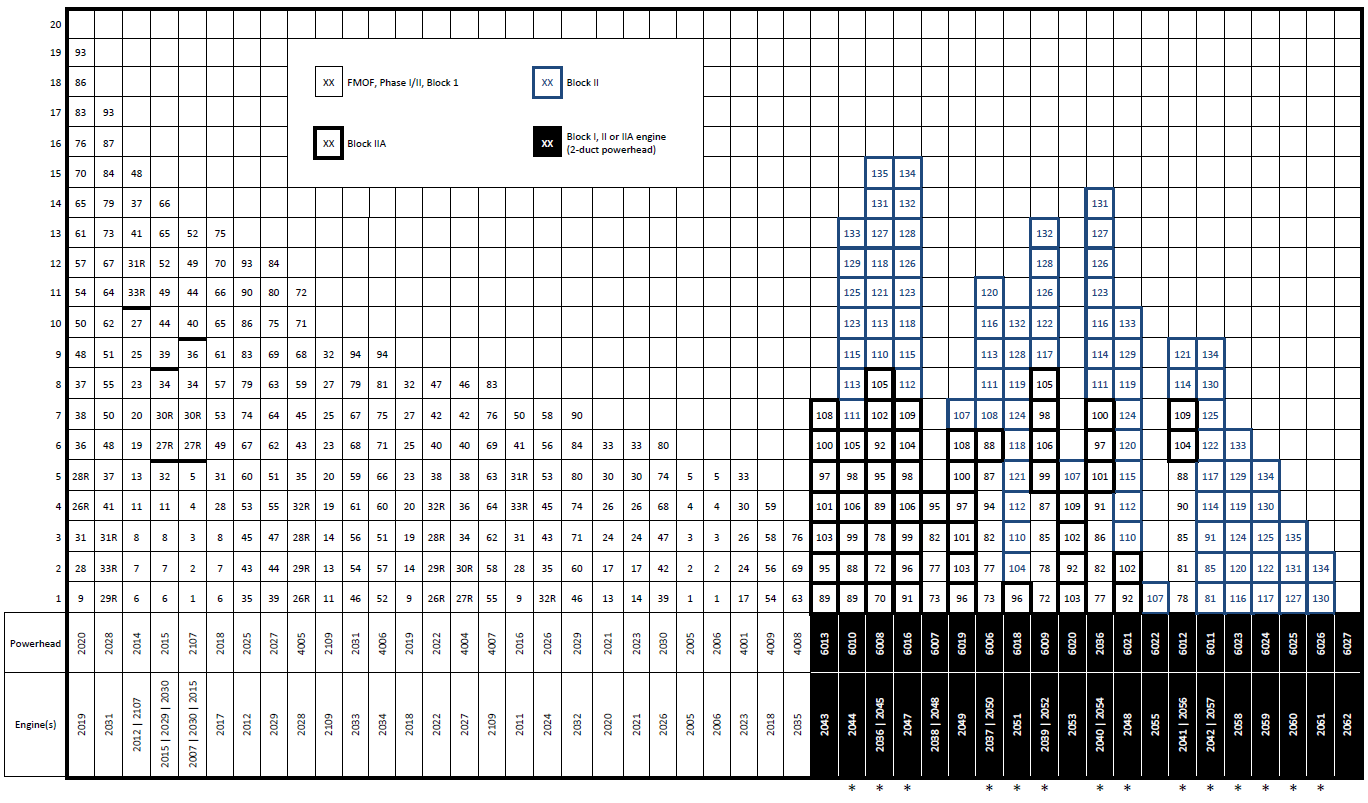
Flight history of the Space Shuttle Main Engines

Over the course of the Space Shuttle program, the RS-25 went through a series of upgrades, including combustion chamber changes, improved welds and turbopump changes in an effort to improve the engine's performance and reliability and so reduce the amount of maintenance required after use. As a result, several versions of the RS-25 were used during the program:

- FMOF (first manned orbital flight): Certified for 100% rated power level (RPL). Used for the orbital flight test missions STS-1 – STS-5 (engines 2005, 2006 and 2007).
- Phase I: Used for missions STS-6 – STS-51-L, the Phase I engine offered increased service life and was certified for 104% RPL. Replaced by Phase II after the Challenger Disaster.
- Phase II (RS-25A): First flown on STS-26, the Phase II engine offered a number of safety upgrades and was certified for 104% & 109% RPL (full power level, FPL) in the event of a contingency.
- Block I (RS-25B): First flown on STS-70, the Block I engines offered improved turbopumps featuring ceramic bearings, half as many rotating parts, and a new casting process reducing the number of welds. Block I improvements also included a new, two-duct powerhead (rather than the original design, which featured three ducts connected to the HPFTP and two to the HPOTP), which helped improve hot gas flow, and an improved engine heat exchanger.
- Block IA (RS-25B): First flown on STS-73, the Block IA engine offered main injector improvements.
- Block IIA (RS-25C): First flown on STS-89, the Block IIA engine was an interim model used whilst certain components of the Block II engine completed development. Changes included a new large throat main combustion chamber (which had originally been recommended by Rocketdyne in 1980), improved low-pressure turbopumps, and certification for 104.5% RPL to compensate for a 2 seconds (0.020 km/s) reduction in specific impulse (original plans called for the engine to be certified to 106% for heavy International Space Station payloads, but this was not required and would have reduced engine service life). A slightly modified version first flew on STS-96.
- Block II (RS-25D): First flown on STS-104, the Block II upgrade included all of the Block IIA improvements plus a new high-pressure fuel turbopump. This model was ground-tested to 111% RPL in the event of a contingency abort, and certified for 109% RPL for use during an intact abort.
- RS-25E: A variant in development. It is planned to be used on the Space Launch System for future Artemis program missions beginning with Artemis V, as the RS-25D stock is gradually being expended on SLS flights (the core stage is disposed in the atmosphere, along with the engines). Unlike previous versions, this engine is designed to be expendable. The powerhead is almost completely redesigned (as of September 2023 the specific design changes from the RS-25D have not been announced), and intended to incorporate various cost-saving measures and innovations in manufacturing. The first testing engine, E10001, passed all its qualifications and tests at NASA's Stennis Space Center, and demonstrated operation at 113% RPL.

==== Engine throttle/output ====
The most obvious effects of the upgrades the RS-25 received through the Space Shuttle program were the improvements in engine throttle. Whilst the FMOF engine had a maximum output of 100% (RPL), Block II engines could throttle as high as 109% or 111% in an emergency, with usual flight performance being 104.5%. Existing engines used on the Space Launch System are throttled to 109% RPL during normal flight, while new RS-25E engines produced for the Space Launch System can be run at 111% RPL, with 113% throttle being tested. These increases in throttle level made a corresponding difference to the thrust produced by the engine:

	Of RPL (%)	Thrust	
	Of RPL (%)	Sea level	Vacuum
Minimum power level (MPL)	67		1,406 kN (316,100 lb_{f})
Rated power level (RPL)	100	1,670 kN (380,000 lb_{f})	2,090 kN (470,000 lb_{f})
Nominal power level (NPL)	104.5	1,750 kN (390,000 lb_{f})	2,170 kN (490,000 lb_{f})
Full power level (FPL)	109	1,860 kN (420,000 lb_{f})	2,280 kN (510,000 lb_{f})
SLS Production Restart	111		2,320 kN (521,000 lb_{f})
Production Restart Abort	113	1,887 kN (424,000 lb_{f})	2,362 kN (531,000 lb_{f})

Specifying power levels over 100% may seem nonsensical, but there was a logic behind it. The 100% level does not mean the maximum physical power level attainable, rather it was a specification decided on during engine development—the expected rated power level. When later studies indicated the engine could operate safely at levels above 100%, these higher levels became standard. Maintaining the original relationship of power level to physical thrust helped reduce confusion, as it created an unvarying fixed relationship so that test data (or operational data from past or future missions) can be easily compared. If the power level was increased, and that new value was said to be 100%, then all previous data and documentation would either require changing or cross-checking against what physical thrust corresponded to 100% power level on that date. Engine power level affects engine reliability, with studies indicating the probability of an engine failure increasing rapidly with power levels over 104.5%, which was why power levels above 104.5% were retained for contingency use only.

==== Incidents ====
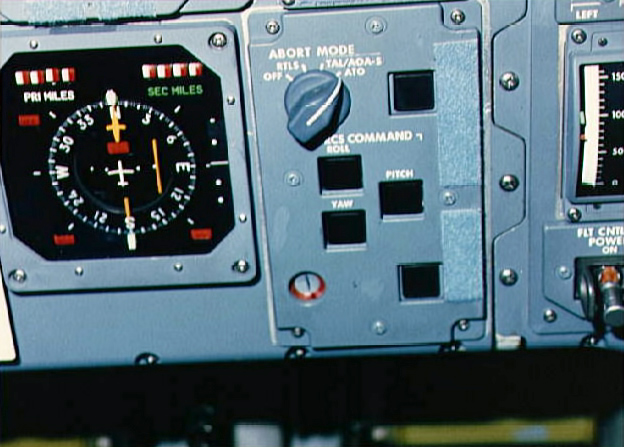
This Shuttle control panel is set to select the abort to orbit (ATO) option, as used in the STS-51-F mission. After orbit was achieved, the mission continued normally and the orbiter returned to Earth with the crew.

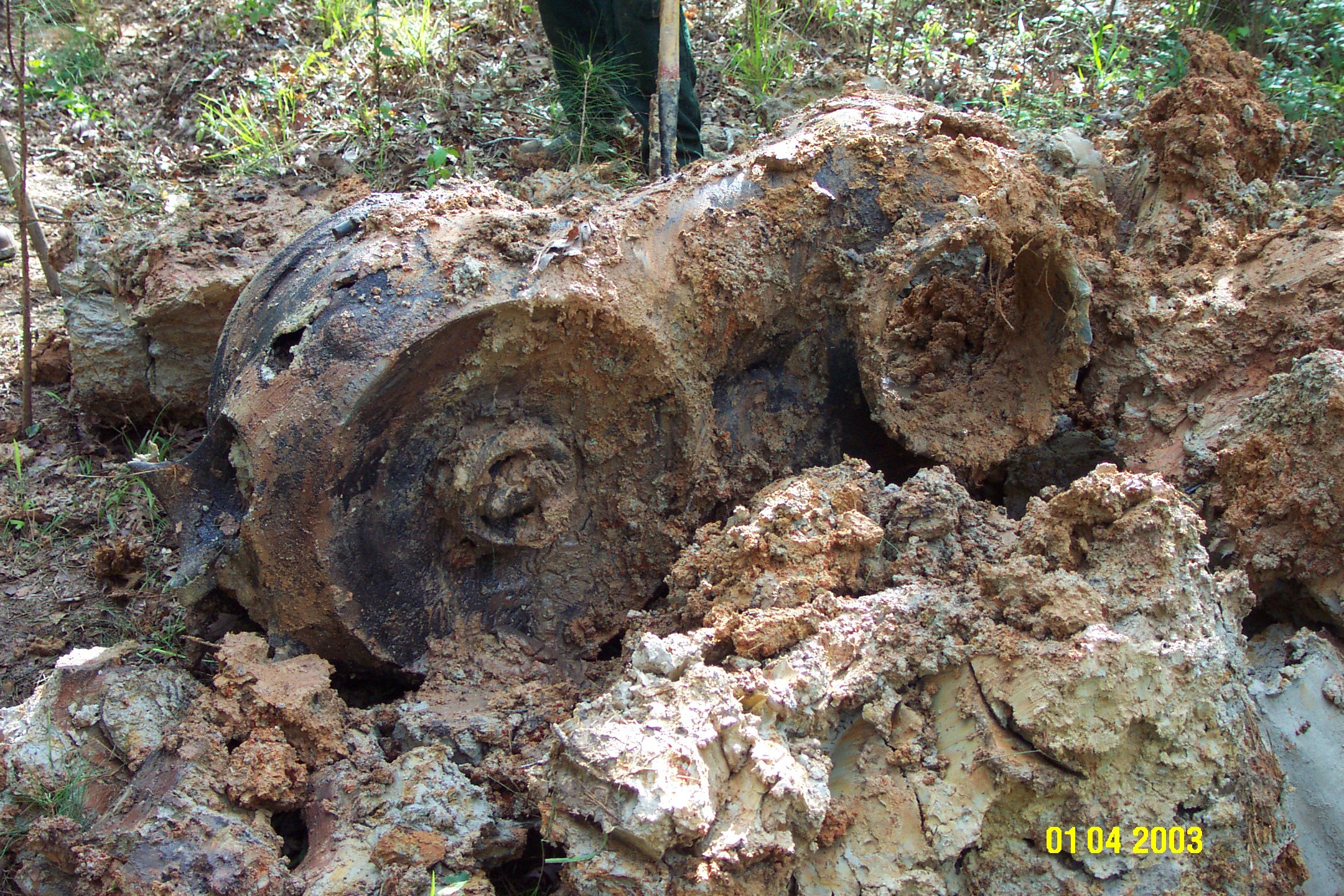
Recovered power-head of one of Columbia's main engines. Columbia was lost on re-entry, from a heat shield failure.

During the course of the Space Shuttle program, a total of 46 RS-25 engines were used (with one extra RS-25D being built but never used). During the 135 missions, for a total of 405 individual engine-missions, Pratt & Whitney Rocketdyne reports a 99.95% reliability rate, with the only in-flight SSME failure occurring during Space Shuttle Challenger's STS-51-F mission. The engines, however, did suffer from a number of pad failures (redundant set launch sequencer aborts, or RSLSs) and other issues during the course of the program:

- STS-41-D Discovery – No. 3 engine caused an RSLS shutdown at T−4 seconds due to loss of redundant control on main engine valve, stack rolled back and engine replaced.
- STS-51-F Challenger – No. 2 engine caused an RSLS shutdown at T−3 seconds due to a coolant valve malfunction.
- STS-51-F Challenger – No. 1 engine (2023) shutdown at T+5:43 due to faulty temperature sensors, leading to an abort to orbit (although the mission objectives and length were not compromised by the ATO).
- STS-55 Columbia – No. 3 engine caused an RSLS shutdown at T−3 seconds due to a leak in its liquid-oxygen preburner check valve.
- STS-51 Discovery – No. 2 engine caused an RSLS shut down at T−3 seconds due to a faulty hydrogen fuel sensor.
- STS-68 Endeavour – No. 3 engine (2032) caused an RSLS shutdown at T−1.9 seconds when a temperature sensor in its HPOTP exceeded its redline.
- STS-93 Columbia – An Orbiter Project AC1 Phase A electrical wiring short occurred at T+5 seconds causing an under voltage which disqualified SSME 1A and SSME 3B controllers but required no engine shut down. In addition, a 0.1-inch diameter, 1-inch long gold-plated pin, used to plug an oxidizer post orifice (an inappropriate SSME corrective action eliminated from the fleet by redesign) came loose inside an engine's main injector and impacted the engine nozzle inner surface, rupturing three hydrogen cooling lines. The resulting three breaches caused a leak resulting in a premature engine shutdown, when four external tank LO_{2} sensors flashed dry resulting in low-level cutoff of the main engines and a slightly early main engine cut-off with a 16 ft/s (4.9 m/s) underspeed, and an 8 nautical mile lower altitude.

=== Constellation program ===
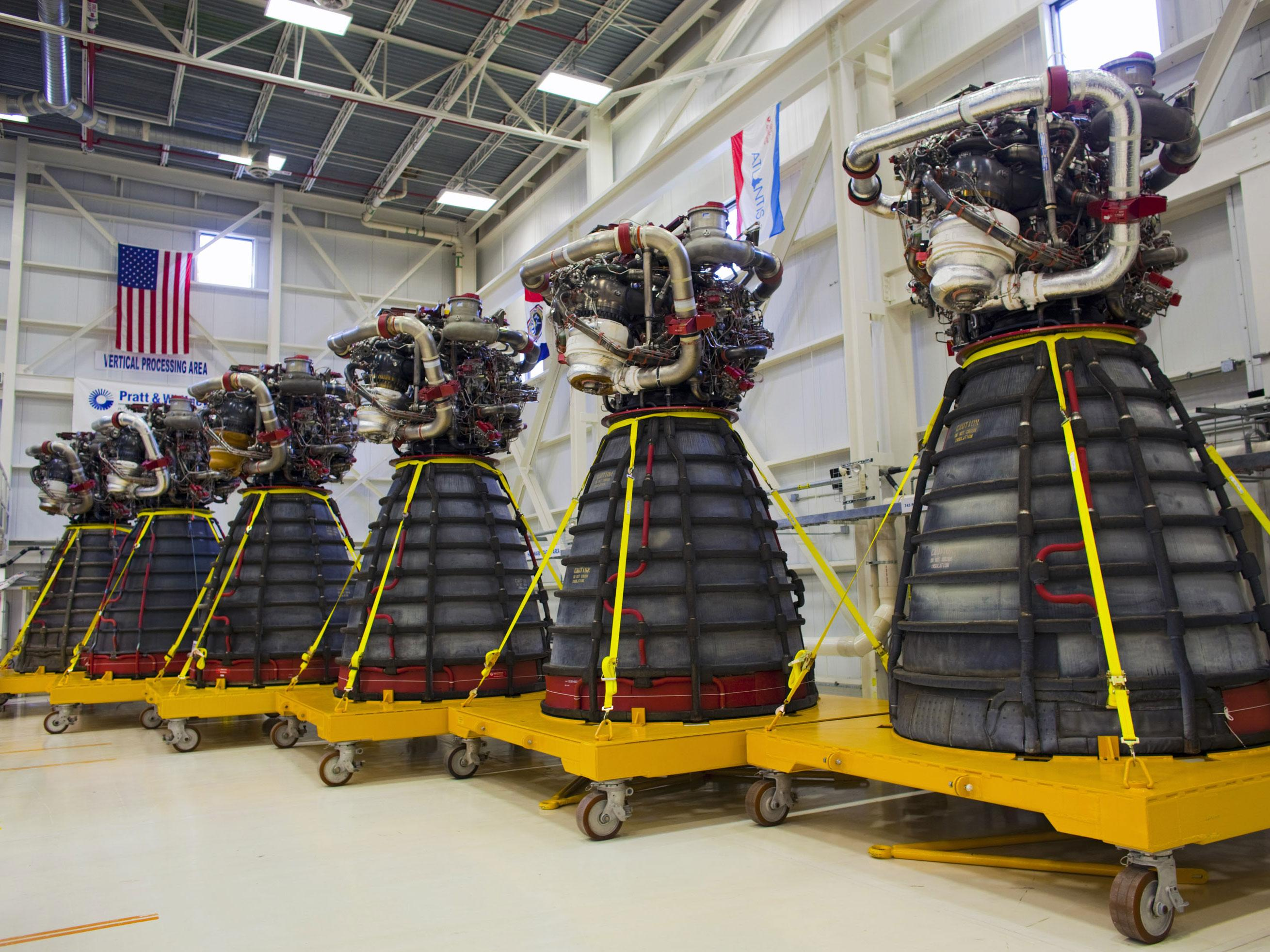
The six RS-25Ds used during STS-134 and STS-135 in storage at Kennedy Space Center

During the period preceding final Space Shuttle retirement, various plans for the remaining engines were proposed, ranging from them all being kept by NASA, to them all being given away (or sold for US$400,000–800,000 each) to various institutions such as museums and universities. This policy followed changes to the planned configurations of the Constellation program's Ares V cargo-launch vehicle and Ares I crew-launch vehicle rockets, which had been planned to use the RS-25 in their first and second stages respectively. While these configurations had initially seemed worthwhile, as they would use then-current technology following the shuttle's retirement in 2010, the plan had several drawbacks:

- The engines would not be reusable, as they would be permanently attached to the discarded stages and disposed of in the atmosphere.
- Each engine would have to undergo a test firing prior to installation and launch, with refurbishment required following the test.
- It would be expensive, time-consuming, and weight-intensive to convert the ground-started RS-25D to an air-started version for the Ares I second stage.

Following several design changes to the Ares I and Ares V rockets, the RS-25 was replaced with a single J-2X engine for the Ares I second stage and six modified RS-68 engines (which was based on both the SSME and Apollo-era J-2 engine) on the Ares V core stage; these changes meant that the RS-25 would be retired along with the Shuttle fleet. In 2010, however, NASA was directed to halt the Constellation program, and with it development of the Ares I and Ares V, instead of focusing on building a new heavy-lift launcher.

=== XS-1 ===
On May 24, 2017, DARPA announced that they had selected The Boeing Company to complete design work on the XS-1 program. The technology demonstrator was planned to use an Aerojet Rocketdyne AR-22 engine. The AR-22 was a version of the RS-25, with parts sourced from Aerojet Rocketdyne and NASA inventories from early versions of the engine. In July 2018 Aerojet Rocketdyne successfully completed ten 100-second firings of the AR-22 in ten days.

On January 22, 2020, Boeing announced its departure from the XS-1 program, leaving no role for the AR-22.

== Present use ==
=== Space Launch System ===
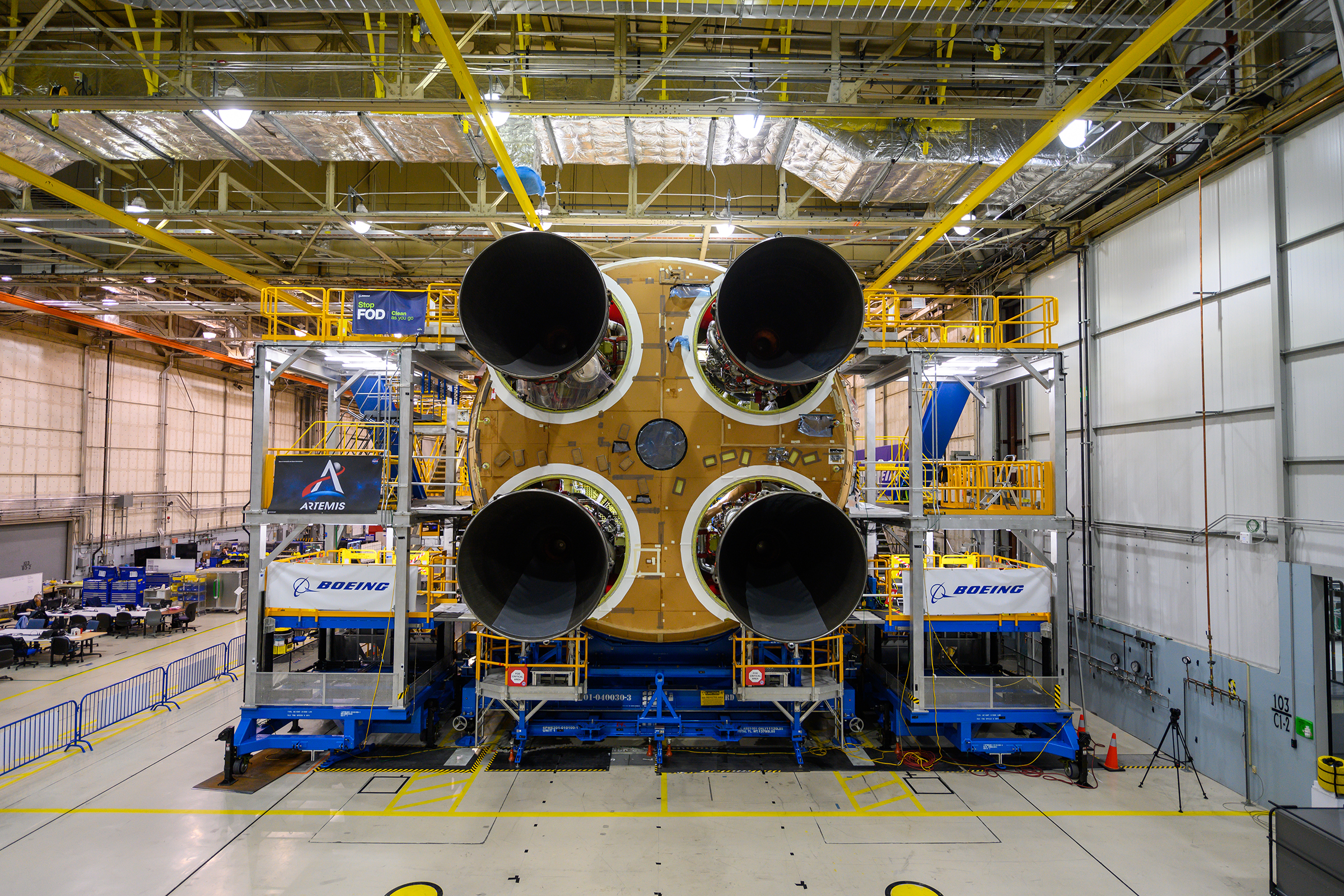
Aft view of the bottom of the Space Launch System's core stage with four RS-25 engines attached, at the Michoud Assembly Facility in Building 103, on 7 November 2019

On 14 September 2011, following the retirement of the Space Shuttle, NASA announced that it would be developing a new launch vehicle, known as the Space Launch System (SLS), to replace the shuttle fleet. The design for the SLS features the RS-25 as part of its core stage, with different versions of the rocket being equipped with between three and five engines. The initial flights of the new launch vehicle are making use of previously flown Block II RS-25D engines, with NASA keeping such engines in a "purged safe" environment at Stennis Space Center, "along with all of the ground systems required to maintain them." For Artemis I, the RS-25D units with serial numbers E2045, E2056, E2058, and E2060 from all three orbiters were used. They were installed on the core stage by November 6, 2019. For Artemis II, the units with serial numbers E2047, E2059, E2062, and E2063 were slated to be used. They were installed on the core stage by September 25, 2023. In spring 2025, engine E2063 was replaced with E2061 after a leak was discovered in its oxygen valve hydraulics.

In addition to the RS-25Ds, the SLS program makes use of the Main Propulsion Systems (MPS, the "plumbing" feeding the engines) from the three remaining shuttle orbiters for testing purposes (having been removed as part of the orbiters' decommissioning), with the first two launches (Artemis I and Artemis II) originally predicted to make use of the MPS hardware from Space Shuttles Atlantis and Endeavour in their core stages. The SLS's propellants are supplied to the engines from the rocket's core stage, which consists of a modified Space Shuttle external tank with the MPS plumbing and engines at its aft, and an interstage structure at the top.

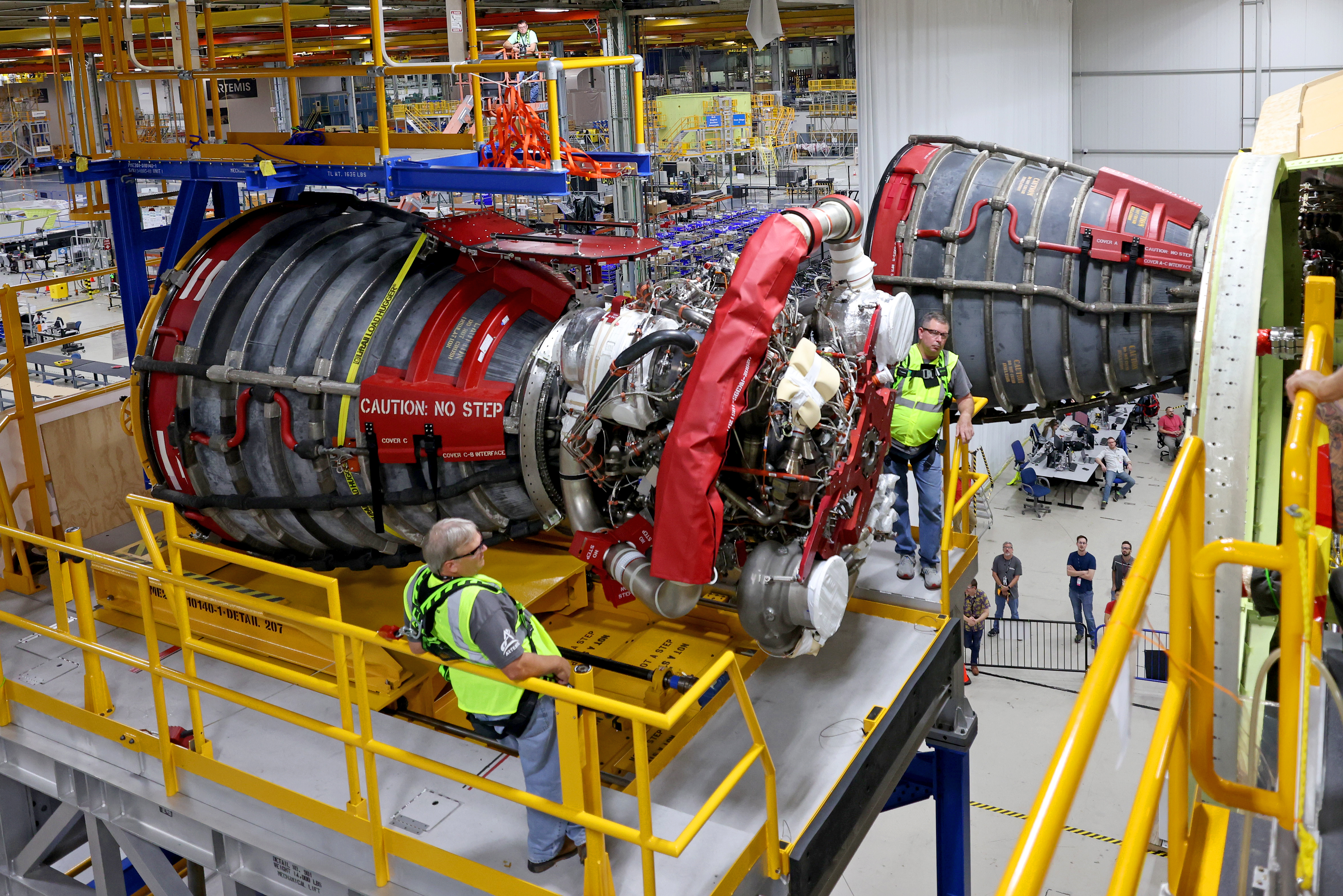
RS-25s as seen during their Core Stage integration for Artemis II

For the first two Artemis missions, the engines were installed on the SLS core stage in Building 103 of the Michoud Assembly Facility; they will be installed in the Space Station Processing Facility at Kennedy beginning with Artemis III.

Once the remaining RS-25Ds are exhausted, they are to be replaced with a cheaper, expendable version designated the RS-25E. In 2023, Aerojet Rocketdyne reported reductions in manufacturing time and labor requirements during manufacturing of new-production RS-25 engines, such as a 15% reduction in fabrication time for the powerhead and a 22-month reduction in the time needed to produce a main combustion chamber.

On 1 May 2020, NASA awarded a contract extension to manufacture 18 additional RS-25 engines, with associated services, for $1.79 billion, bringing the total SLS contract value to almost $3.5 billion.

On 29 August 2022, Artemis I was delayed by a problem with engineering sensors on RS-25D #3 (serial number E2058) erroneously reporting that it hadn't chilled down to its ideal operating temperature.

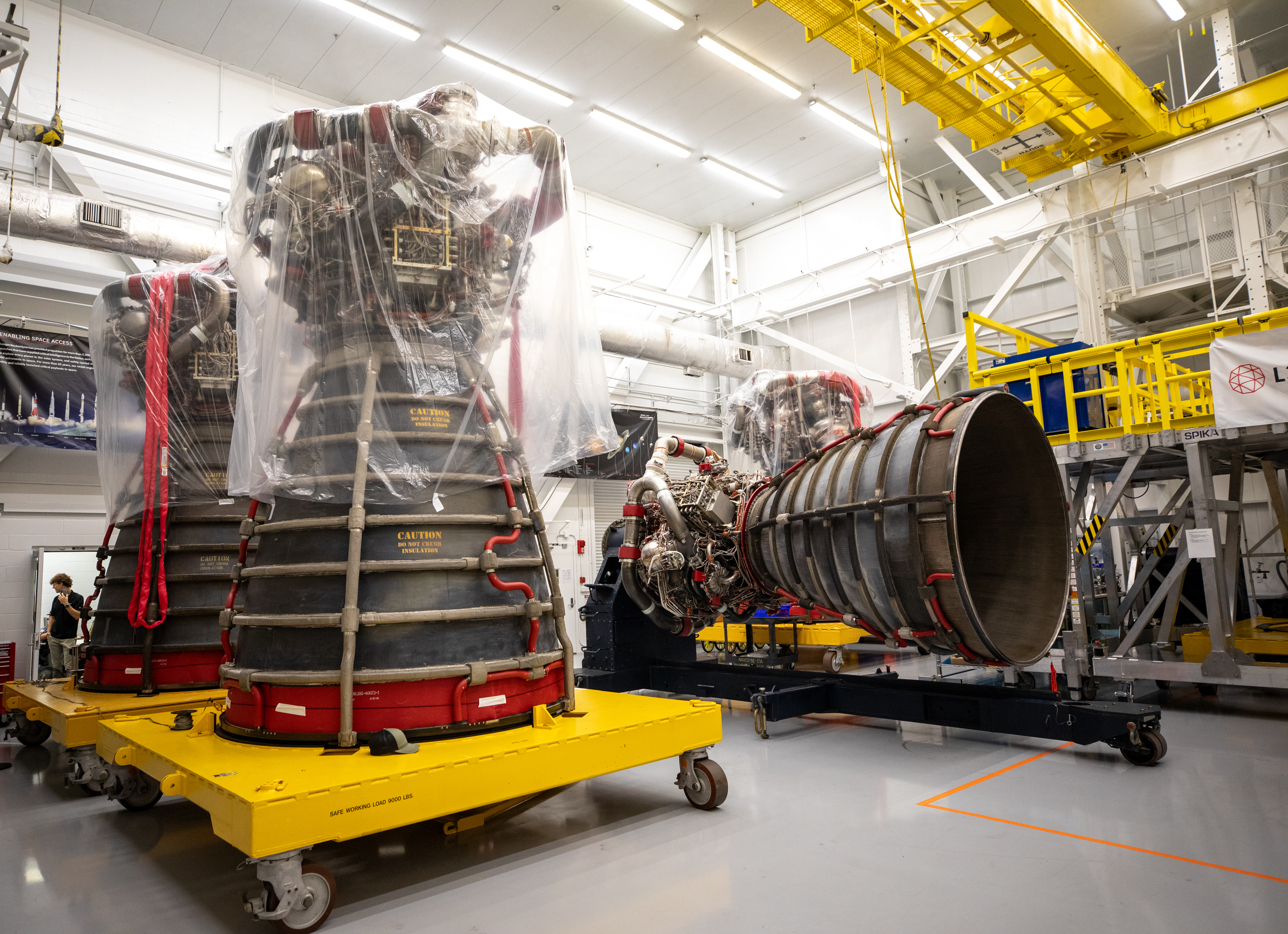
The four RS-25D being prepared for Artemis III

On 16 November 2022, Artemis I launched from Kennedy Space Center Launch Complex 39B, the first time the RS-25 engine had flown since the Space Shuttle's final flight, STS-135, on 21 July 2011.

==== Engine tests ====
In 2015, a test campaign was conducted to determine RS-25 engine performance with a new engine controller unit, under lower liquid-oxygen temperatures, with greater inlet pressure due to the taller SLS core-stage liquid-oxygen tank and higher vehicle acceleration; and with more nozzle heating due to the four-engine configuration and its position in-plane with the SLS booster exhaust nozzles. New ablative heat-shield insulation was to be tested as well. Tests occurred on January 9 (500 seconds), May 28 (450 seconds), June 11 (500 seconds), June 25 (650 seconds), July 17 (535 seconds), August 13 (535 seconds) and August 27 (535 seconds).

Following these tests, four more engines were scheduled to enter a new test cycle. A new series of tests designed to evaluate performance in SLS-use cases was initiated in 2017.

On February 28, 2019, NASA conducted a 510-second test burn of a developmental RS-25 at 113 percent of its originally designed thrust for more than 430 seconds, about four times longer than any prior test at this thrust level.

On January 16, 2021, the RS-25 engines were fired again, during a hot-fire test as part of the Artemis program. The test was originally scheduled as an 8-minute test but was terminated at the 67th second due to intentionally conservative test parameters being breached in the hydraulic system of Engine 2's (serial number E2056) Core Stage Auxiliary Power Unit (CAPU) during the thrust vector control (TVC) system test. Engine 2's CAPU was shut down automatically, although if this issue had occurred during flight, it would not have caused an abort, as the remaining CAPUs are capable of powering the TVC systems of all four engines. The engine also suffered a different "Major Component Failure", in the engine control system, that was caused by instrumentation failure. This would have triggered an abort of the launch countdown during an actual launch attempt.

On March 18, 2021, the four RS-25 core-stage engines were once again fired as part of the second SLS core stage hot-fire test, which lasted the full duration of 500 seconds, successfully certifying the Artemis I core stage for flight.

On December 14, 2022, a single development RS-25E, serial number E10001, attempted a 500-second hot-fire test. The test aborted at T+209.5 due to test systems subsequently interpreting signals from a group of improperly configured accelerometers during the hot fire as exceeding acceptable vibration limits. Tests of the engine continued in 2023; on February 8, 2023, it was fired for 500 seconds at 111% power, fitted with a new-production nozzle. Subsequent tests included a 600-second test at 111% power on February 22, a 520-second test at 113% power on March 8, a 600-second test at 113% power on March 21, a 500-second, 113% power level test on April 5, a 720-second fire that tested the engine's thrust vectoring gimbal system on April 26, a 630-second test on May 10, and five more 500-second, 113% power level tests without gimbaling on May 23, June 1, June 8, June 15, and June 22.

The RS-25E developmental unit E0525, with significant inclusion of new components including a redesigned nozzle, hydraulic actuators, flex ducts and turbopumps, was hot fire tested to 111% power levels for 550 seconds in the first in a series of certification tests beginning October 17, 2023. It was tested to 113% power levels for 500 seconds on November 15, and to 113% for 650 seconds with gimbaling on November 29, 2023, to 113% for 500 seconds on January 17, 2024, January 23, and January 29, to 113% for 550 seconds on February 23, to 111% for 615 seconds on February 29, and to 113% for 600 seconds on March 6 and 500 seconds on March 22 and 27, and April 3.

On February 20, 2025, engine no. E20001 was installed at the test stand, the first full production RS-25E to undergo testing. It was tested to 111% power levels for 500 seconds on June 20. On November 12, the second production RS-25E, serial number E20002, was tested to the same levels and time limit.

On January 22, 2026, the RS-25D engine with serial number E2063 was successfully tested to 109% power levels for 300 seconds, to validate post-repair work in its oxygen valve hydraulics and clear it for assignment to Artemis IV.

== See also ==
- Shuttle-C
- RD-0120

== Notes ==
External videos
- STS-49 Flight Readiness Firing
- Time-lapse video of STS-135 SSME installation
- RS-25 test for SLS on 28 May 2015
- RS-25 engine controller system test on 27 July 2017
- RS-25 test for SLS on 17 October 2023
