= Blackstar (spacecraft) =

Reported codename of a secret U.S. orbital spaceplane system

The March 6, 2006 cover of Aviation Week & Space Technology depicting the rumored "Blackstar" project vehicles

Blackstar is the purported name of a secret United States orbital spaceplane system. The possible existence of the Blackstar program was claimed in March 2006 by an article in Aviation Week & Space Technology (Aviation Week, AWST) magazine; the magazine claimed that the program had been underway since at least the early 1990s, and that the impetus for Blackstar was to allow the United States government to retain orbital reconnaissance capabilities jeopardized following the 1986 Challenger disaster. The article also said that the United States Air Force's Space Command was unaware of Blackstar, suggesting it was operated by an intelligence agency such as the National Reconnaissance Office.

Aviation Week speculated that such a spacecraft could also have offensive military capabilities, a concept colloquially known as "The Space Bomber". The magazine also stated that it was likely that Blackstar would be mothballed, although it is unclear whether this is due to cost or failure of the program.

The Aviation Week report, which was, and as of 2025 remains, the sole evidence of the program's possible existence, was dismissed a few days later as "almost certainly bogus" and the project termed a "technical absurdity" by Jeffrey F. Bell in an article in Space Daily.

== The Blackstar system ==
Aviation Week describes Blackstar as a two-stage-to-orbit system, the first stage of which would be a delta-winged supersonic jet (which Aviation Week referred to as the SR-3). Its description of SR-3 is similar to the North American B-70 Valkyrie Mach 3 strategic bomber, and to patents filed in the 1980s by Boeing. The article claimed the SR-3 mothership would carry a second, smaller airframe, codenamed the XOV (eXperimental Orbital Vehicle) underneath, as a parasite aircraft. This parasite aircraft would be a rocket-powered spaceplane propelled by aerospike engines, and capable of both suborbital and orbital flight; one source quoted by the Aviation Week article estimates the XOV could reach an orbit of 300 miles (480 km) above the Earth, depending on payload and mission profile. The XOV would then reenter the atmosphere and glide back to any landing site where it would land horizontally on a conventional runway.

This combination of jet-powered mothership and a smaller rocket-powered spaceplane resembles the civilian Tier One spaceplane system as well as NASA's X-15 spaceplane, but capable of much higher velocities and thus of attaining orbit.

== Similar aircraft ==
As a purported black project to develop a high-altitude reconnaissance aircraft, which has never been definitively proven to exist, Blackstar bears a great deal of similarity to the better-known Aurora rumor.

The claimed role of the system, and its supposed operation by a US intelligence agency, strongly resemble the Central Intelligence Agency's cancelled Project Isinglass.

Saenger was a cancelled design for a two-stage-to-orbit spaceplane system which, like Blackstar, was to consist of a delta-winged, jet-powered supersonic mothership and an air-launched rocket-powered parasite craft.

== See also ==
- Boeing X-20 Dyna-Soar
- British Aerospace HOTOL
- Lockheed SR-71 Blackbird
- North American XB-70 Valkyrie
- Rockwell X-30 National Aerospace Plane
- VentureStar

== Bibliography ==
- Miller, Jay (2001), The X-Planes: X-1 to X-45, Hinckley, UK: Midland.
