= Pratt & Whitney XLR-129 =

American rocket engine design

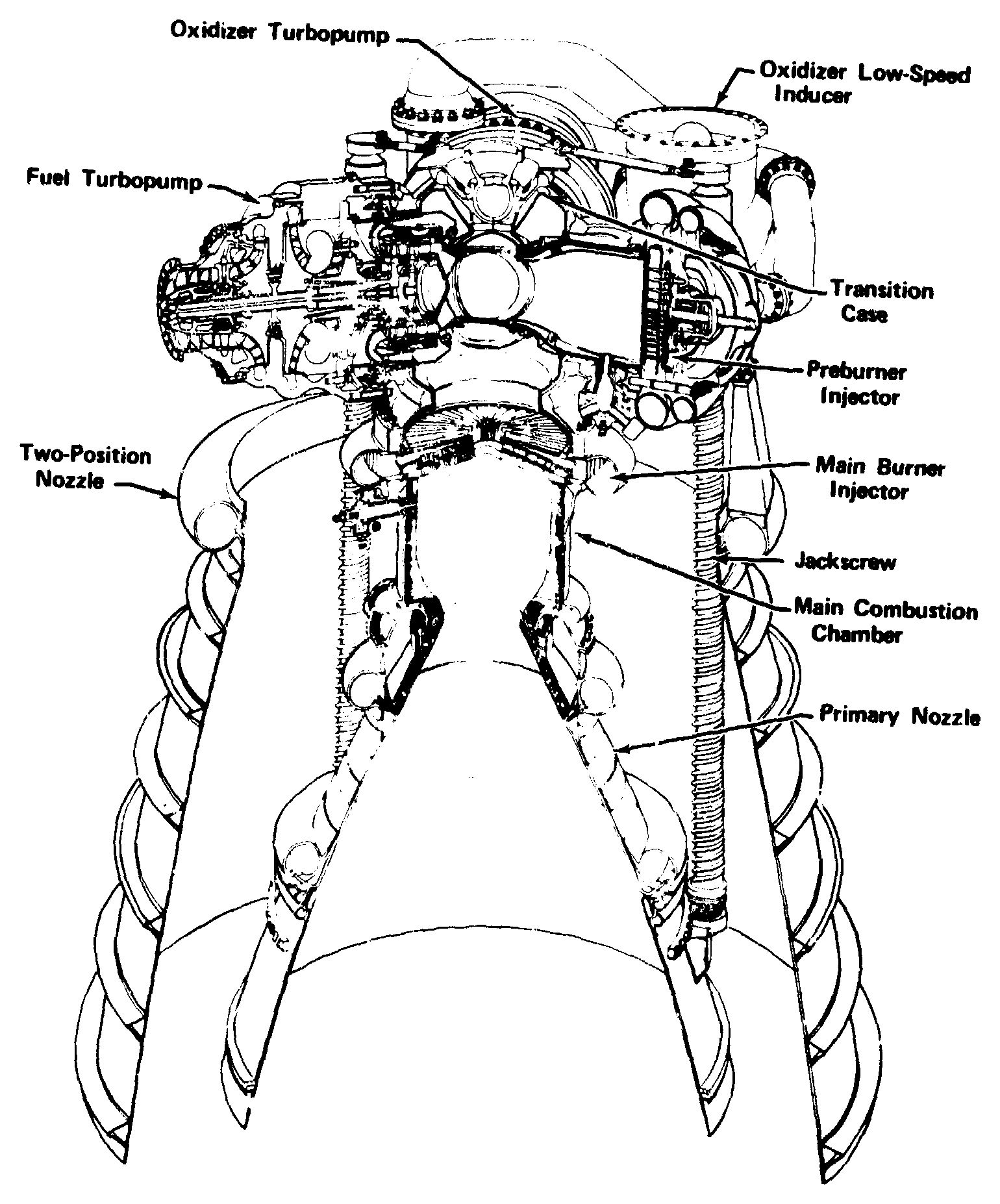
Cut-drawing of XLR-129 demonstrator engine

The XLR-129 was an American rocket engine design that would have used liquid hydrogen and liquid oxygen propellants. It was developed by Pratt & Whitney and initially was to develop 250,000 lbf (1,100 kN) of thrust. It featured an expanding nozzle in order to tune performance over a wide range of altitudes.

The XLR-129 was designed to be reusable and was initially paid for by the US Air Force, for a 1960s program called ISINGLASS, which was to be a manned rocket plane that was intended for surveillance overflights. For the Space Shuttle an attempt was made to increase the thrust to 350,000 lbf (1,600 kN), but in the end Rocketdyne's Space Shuttle Main Engine was used instead.

The XLR-129 program was never completed, no complete engine was ever produced, but many systems were developed and tested.
