= Project Isinglass =

Former planned US Central Intelligence Agency aircraft

General information
- Type: Reconnaissance aircraft
- Status: Cancelled 1967
- Primary user: Central Intelligence Agency
- Number built: 0

Project Isinglass was the code name given to two heavily classified, crewed reconnaissance aircraft studied by the Central Intelligence Agency (CIA) as potential replacements for the Lockheed A-12 and SR-71 during the mid-1960s. The first proposal under the Isinglass name, a high-altitude plane to fly at Mach 4 – Mach 5 (4,900–6,100 km/h; 3,000–3,800 mph), was considered an insufficient advancement over existing aircraft; the second, much more advanced design, sometimes referred to as Project Rheinberry, was an air-launched, Mach 20 (24,500 km/h; 15,200 mph) rocket-powered boost-glide aircraft that would use a very-high-altitude trajectory to avoid defenses. This aircraft was considered too costly for development, and the project was abandoned in 1967.

== Origins ==
Project Isinglass was developed as a result of the vulnerability of existing crewed reconnaissance aircraft, such as the Lockheed U-2 and the Lockheed A-12, to Soviet air defenses in the early 1960s, catalysed by the shooting down in May 1960 of Francis Gary Powers. Although there were continuing plans to overfly the Soviet Union with the A-12 – referred to by the CIA as Project Oxcart – these failed to come to pass, and the CIA began plans for an aircraft with superior performance to replace Oxcart.

== The Convair proposal ==
The initial aircraft proposed under the Project Isinglass name was developed by the Convair division of General Dynamics, and was developed from work done on the Super Hustler, FISH, and Kingfish programs, as well as leveraging off work done on the F-111 tactical bomber. Convair's design utilised avionics and hydraulics systems that had been developed for use by the F-111, and was intended to be capable of cruising at speeds of Mach 4 to Mach 5, at an altitude of 98,000 ft (30 km). The feasibility study conducted by General Dynamics was completed in the fall of 1964; the aircraft was determined to be too costly, and was also still considered potentially vulnerable to projected Soviet air defense capabilities, so the project was halted.

== The McDonnell proposal ==
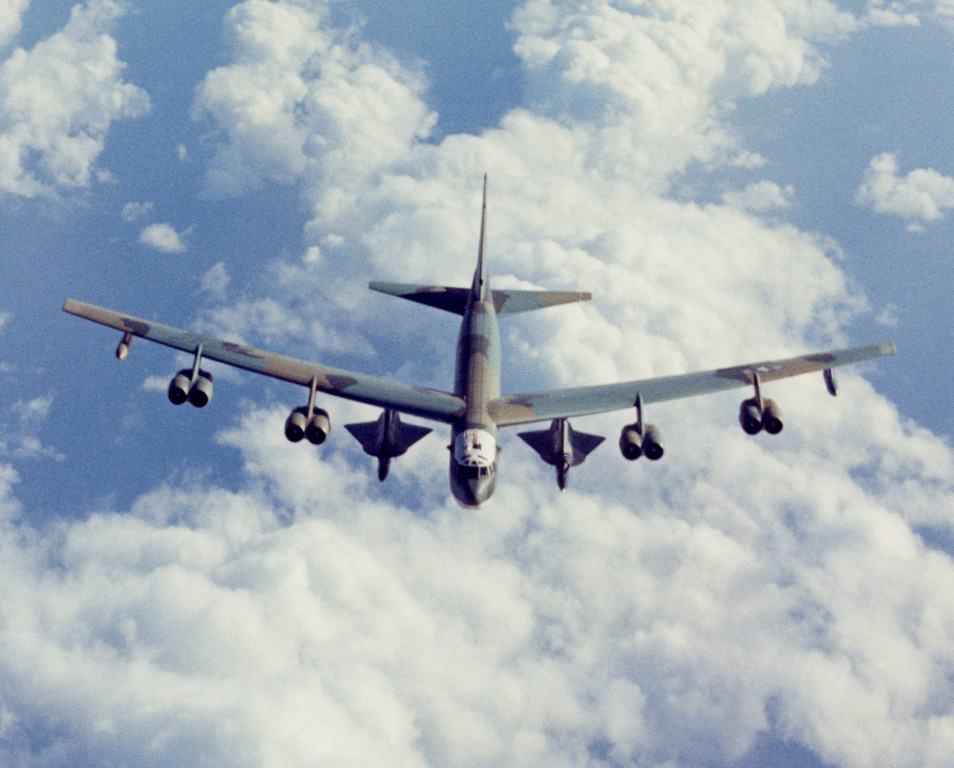
A B-52 carrying two D-21 drones; Isinglass would have been carried and launched in this fashion

=== Design and development ===
The Model 192 completed by McDonnell Aircraft in 1965 is usually considered part of Project Isinglass, however some documents refer to the aircraft as having been codenamed Project Rheinberry. McDonnell's proposed boost-glide aircraft, submitted to the CIA independently of the Convair Isinglass proposals, featured a small, crewed, rocket-powered craft with a high lift-to-drag ratio that would be air-launched by a B-52 bomber while flying over the Atlantic Ocean. The aircraft would ignite its rocket engine and adopt a trajectory that would take it over the Soviet Union at speeds of Mach 20 (Note: A retired CIA officer interviewed about the project places the intended speed of the craft at Mach 22, but publicly available contemporaneous documents place it at Mach 20.) and at an altitude of over 200,000 feet (61 km), before descending over the Pacific Ocean to a landing at Groom Lake, Nevada, as a glider, landing on the lake bed using a skid landing gear.

The Isinglass/Rheinberry concept was considered to be superior to spy satellites in a number of ways, including rapid turnaround time and quick response capability. As there was little funding to be had from the CIA budget, McDonnell developed the aircraft using its own funds, although technical support gleaned from Oxcart was supplied by the CIA. The McDonnell Model 192 had a shape similar to that of the Space Shuttle, albeit much reduced in size. A 1/3 cross-sectional model of the aircraft was constructed to illustrate the principles used in its construction.

Simulations showed that the aircraft would be essentially unstoppable by existing or projected air defenses; even surface-to-air missiles armed with nuclear warheads could do no better than force the aircraft to change course to avoid the fringe effects of the explosions.

=== Cancellation ===
Following fourteen months of work, McDonnell had developed the aircraft to the point where serious proposals were made for its construction. Neither the CIA nor the National Reconnaissance Office had an official requirement for such an aircraft. The projected cost of the aircraft was astronomical: the cost for eight aircraft was projected to be $2.6 billion USD in 1965 dollars (inflation adjusted US$ 26.56 billion in 2025), a sum considered to be far too high for the available budget. There also were concerns that the aircraft's trajectory could be mistaken for that of an incoming ballistic missile.

When the CIA failed to receive approval for funding, McDonnell approached the U.S. Air Force with the project. The Air Force proved uninterested in adopting the CIA project, despite the support of General Bernard Schriever, chief of the Air Force Systems Command. In late 1967 Isinglass was terminated, with an unsuccessful effort to revive the project in 1968.

== Engine development ==
Although the development of the Isinglass/Rheinberry aircraft was conducted using McDonnell's own funding, the United States Air Force's Air Force Rocket Propulsion Laboratory did fund the development of the aircraft's intended engine, the Pratt & Whitney XLR-129, intended to be a reusable rocket engine. To be powered by liquid hydrogen and liquid oxygen and producing 250,000 lb_{f} (1,100 kN) thrust at full throttle. Development of the XLR-129 continued after the cancellation of Project Isinglass, and was considered for use by the Space Shuttle, but was cancelled in the early 1970s.

== See also ==
- Aurora – Rumored aircraft
- Blackstar (spacecraft)
- NASA X-43 – Unmanned US experimental hypersonic aircraft, 1991-2000

Related development

- Convair Kingfish

Aircraft of comparable role, configuration, and era

- Boeing X-20 Dyna-Soar
- Lockheed CL-400 Suntan
- Lockheed SR-71 Blackbird
- Tsybin RSR – 1959 reconnaissance aircraft prototype by Tsybin

Related lists

- List of military aircraft of the United States
