= Sputnik (rocket) =

Small carrier rocket

- Sputnik rocket
- Function: Early (first) carrier rocket
- Manufacturer: OKB-1
- Country of origin: USSR

Size
- Height: 8K71PS: 30 m (98 ft); 8A91: 31.1 m (102 ft)
- Diameter: 2.99 m (9 ft 10 in)
- Width: 10.303 m (33.80 ft)
- Mass: 8K71PS: 267,000 kg (589,000 lb); 8A91: 269,300 kg (593,700 lb)
- Stages: 2

Capacity

Payload to LEO
- Mass: 8K71PS: 500 kg (1,100 lb); 8A91: 1,327 kg (2,926 lb)

Associated rockets
- Family: R-7
- Comparable: Vanguard; Juno I

Launch history
- Status: Retired
- Launch sites: Baikonur, Site 1/5
- Total launches: 4 (8K71PS: 2, 8A91: 2)
- Success(es): 3
- Failure: 1 (8A91)
- First flight: 8K71PS: 4 October 1957; 8A91: 27 April 1958
- Last flight: 8K71PS: 3 November 1957; 8A91: 15 May 1958
- Carries passengers or cargo: Sputnik 1 Sputnik 2 Sputnik 3

Boosters (First stage) – Block B, V, G & D (Note: This is a transliteration of the second through fifth letters of the Cyrillic alphabet (Б, В, Г, Д). A sense-for-sense translation would correspond to the second through fifth letters of the Latin alphabet, 'Block B, C, D & E'.)
- No. boosters: 4
- Powered by: 1 × RD-107
- Maximum thrust: 970 kN (220,000 lb_{f})
- Specific impulse: 306 s (3.00 km/s)
- Burn time: 120 seconds
- Propellant: LOX / Kerosene

Second stage (core) – Block A
- Powered by: 1 × RD-108
- Maximum thrust: 912 kN (205,000 lb_{f})
- Specific impulse: 308 s (3.02 km/s)
- Burn time: 330 seconds
- Propellant: LOX / Kerosene

The Sputnik rocket was an uncrewed orbital carrier rocket designed by Sergei Korolev in the Soviet Union, derived from the R-7 Semyorka ICBM. On 4 October 1957, it was used to perform the world's first satellite launch, placing Sputnik 1 into a low Earth orbit.

Two versions of the Sputnik were built, the Sputnik-PS (GRAU index 8K71PS), which was used to launch Sputnik 1 and later Sputnik 2, and the Sputnik (8A91), which failed to launch a satellite in April 1958, and subsequently launched Sputnik 3 on 15 May 1958.

A later member of the R-7 family, the Polyot, used the same configuration as the Sputnik rocket, but was constructed from Voskhod components. Because of the similarity, the Polyot was sometimes known as the Sputnik 11A59.

== Specifications ==
- First Stage: Block B, V, G, D (four strap-on boosters)
  - Gross mass: 43 tonnes (95,000 lb)
  - Empty mass: 3.4 tonnes (7,500 lb)
  - Thrust (vac.): 4 × 389 kilonewtons (87,000 lb_{f})
  - Isp (SL): 250 seconds (2.5 km/s)
  - Isp (vac.): 306 seconds (3.00 km/s)
  - Burn time: 120 seconds
  - Diameter: 2.68 metres (8 ft 10 in)
  - Width: 2.68 metres (8 ft 10 in)
  - Length without nozzles: 1.92 metres (6 ft 4 in)
  - Propellants: LOX / Kerosene
  - Engines: 1 × RD-107-8D74PS per booster = 4
- Second Stage: Block A (core stage)
  - Gross mass: 94 tonnes (207,000 lb)
  - Empty mass: 7.495 tonnes (16,520 lb)
  - Thrust (vac.): 970 kilonewtons (220,000 lb_{f})
  - Isp (SL): 241 seconds (2.36 km/s)
  - Isp (vac.): 308 seconds (3.02 km/s)
  - Burn time: 310 seconds (5 minutes, 10 seconds)
  - Diameter: 2.95 metres (9 ft 8 in)
  - Width: 2.95 metres (9 ft 8 in)
  - Length: 2.8 metres (9 ft 2 in)
  - Propellants: LOX / Kerosene
  - Engine: 1 × RD-108-8D75PS
- Total mass: 267 tonnes (589,000 lb)
- Total width: 10.303 metres (33.80 ft)
- LEO payload: 500 kilograms (1,100 lb)
- Total liftoff thrust: 3,890 kilonewtons (870,000 lb_{f})

== Sputnik 8A91 ==
The Sputnik 8A91 had more powerful 8D76 and 8D77 engines installed, increasing its payload capacity, and allowing it to launch much heavier satellites than Sputnik 1 and Sputnik 2. It was launched two times, in 1958. The first launch, on 27 April, failed due to vibrations that unexpectedly occurred during the flight along the longitudinal axis of the rocket. On 15 May, it successfully launched Sputnik 3.

=== Sputnik specifications ===
- First Stage: Block B, V, G, D (four strap-on boosters), 4 × Sputnik 8A91-0
  - Gross mass: 43 tonnes (95,000 lb)
  - Empty mass: 3.4 tonnes (7,500 lb)
  - Thrust (vac.): 4 × 389 kilonewtons (87,000 lb_{f})
  - Isp (SL): 252 seconds (2.47 km/s)
  - Isp (vac.): 310 seconds (3.0 km/s)
  - Burn time: 130 seconds (2 minutes, 10 second)
  - Diameter: 2.68 metres (8 ft 10 in)
  - Width: 2.68 metres (8 ft 10 in)
  - Length without nozzles: 1.92 metres (6 ft 4 in)
  - Propellants: LOX / Kerosene
  - Engines: 1 × RD-107-8D76 per booster = 4
- Second Stage: Block A (core stage), Sputnik 8A91-1
  - Gross mass: 95 tonnes (209,000 lb)
  - Empty mass: 7.1 tonnes (16,000 lb)
  - Thrust (vac.): 804 kilonewtons (181,000 lb_{f})
  - Isp (SL): 246 seconds (2.41 km/s)
  - Isp (vac.): 315 seconds (3.09 km/s)
  - Burn time: 360 seconds (6 minutes)
  - Diameter: 2.95 metres (9 ft 8 in)
  - Width: 2.95 metres (9 ft 8 in)
  - Length: 2.8 metres (9 ft 2 in)
  - Propellants: LOX / Kerosene
  - Engine: 1 × RD-108-8D77
- Total mass: 269.3 tonnes (594,000 lb)
- Total width: 10.303 metres (33.80 ft)
- LEO payload: 1,327 kilograms (2,926 lb)
- Total liftoff thrust: 3,784 kilonewtons (851,000 lb_{f})

== See also ==
SATCAT (No. 1. The satellite has SATCAT No. 2.)
