= Soyuz/Vostok =

Soviet expendable carrier rocket

Vostok-2 (11A510)
- Function: Small-lift launch vehicle
- Manufacturer: OKB-1
- Country of origin: Soviet Union

Size
- Stages: 4

Capacity

Payload to LEO
- Mass: 4,500 kg (9,900 lb)

Associated rockets
- Family: R-7

Launch history
- Status: Retired
- Launch sites: Baikonur, Site 31/6
- Total launches: 2
- Success(es): 2
- First flight: 27 December 1965
- Last flight: 20 July 1966
- Carries passengers or cargo: US-A

Boosters (First stage) – Block B, V, G & D (Note: This is a transliteration of the second through fifth letters of the Cyrillic alphabet (Б, В, Г, Д). A sense-for-sense translation would correspond to the second through fifth letters of the Latin alphabet, 'Block B, C, D & E'.)
- No. boosters: 4
- Powered by: 1 × RD-107
- Maximum thrust: 994.3 kN (223,500 lb_{f})
- Total thrust: 3,977.2 kN (894,100 lb_{f})
- Specific impulse: 315 s (3.09 km/s)
- Burn time: 118 seconds
- Propellant: LOX / RP-1

Second stage (core) – Block A
- Powered by: 1 × RD-108
- Maximum thrust: 977.7 kN (219,800 lb_{f})
- Specific impulse: 315 s (3.09 km/s)
- Burn time: 292 seconds
- Propellant: LOX / RP-1

Third stage
- Powered by: 1 × RD-0109
- Maximum thrust: 54.5 kN (12,300 lb_{f})
- Specific impulse: 365 s (3.58 km/s)
- Burn time: 365 seconds
- Propellant: LOX / RP-1

Fourth stage – Unknown

The Soyuz/Vostok (GRAU index: 11A510) was an interim expendable carrier rocket used by the Soviet Union in 1965 and 1966. Two were launched with prototype US-A satellites.

The Soyuz/Vostok was launched from Site 31/6 at the Baikonur Cosmodrome. It consisted of the boosters (first stage) and second stage (core) from a Soyuz rocket combined with the third stage of the Vostok-2, and an unknown fourth stage. Along with the Voskhod-derived Polyot, it was built as an interim between the cancellation of the UR-200 development programme, and the introduction of the Tsyklon-2, which took over US-A launches once it entered service.
