= Polyot (rocket) =

Soviet rocket

Polyot (11A59)
- Polyot rocket
- Function: Small-lift launch vehicle
- Manufacturer: OKB-1
- Country of origin: Soviet Union

Size
- Height: 30 m (98 ft)
- Diameter: 2.99 m (9 ft 10 in)
- Mass: 277,000 kg (611,000 lb)
- Stages: 1

Capacity

Payload to LEO
- Altitude: 300 km (190 mi)
- Orbital inclination: 59°
- Mass: 1,400 kg (3,100 lb)

Associated rockets
- Family: R-7

Launch history
- Status: Retired
- Launch sites: Baikonur, Site 31/6
- Total launches: 2
- Success(es): 2
- First flight: 1 November 1963
- Last flight: 12 April 1964

Boosters (First stage) – Block B, V, G & D (Note: This is a transliteration of the second through fifth letters of the Cyrillic alphabet (Б, В, Г, Д). A sense-for-sense translation would correspond to the second through fifth letters of the Latin alphabet, 'Block B, C, D & E'.)
- No. boosters: 4
- Powered by: 1 × RD-107-8D74K
- Maximum thrust: 995.3 kN (223,800 lb_{f})
- Total thrust: 3,981.2 kN (895,000 lb_{f})
- Specific impulse: 257 s (2.52 km/s)
- Burn time: 119 seconds
- Propellant: LOX / RP-1

Second stage (core) – Block A
- Powered by: 1 × RD-108
- Maximum thrust: 294 kN (66,000 lb_{f})
- Specific impulse: 330 s (3.2 km/s)
- Burn time: 240 seconds
- Propellant: LOX / RP-1

The Polyot (Russian: Полёт, lit. 'flight', GRAU index: 11A59) was an interim orbital carrier rocket, built to test ASAT spacecraft. It was required as a stopgap after the cancellation of the UR-200 programme, but before the Tsyklon could enter service. Only two were ever launched, the first on 1 November 1963, and the last on 12 April 1964. Both of these flights were successful.

The rocket consisted of a core stage, and four boosters, which were taken from a Voskhod 11A57 rocket. It was capable of delivering a 1,400 kilograms (3,100 lb) payload into a 300 kilometres (190 mi) by 59° Low Earth orbit.

It is a member of the R-7 family, and the final two-stage R-7 rocket used.

== See also ==
=== Comparable rockets ===
- Tsyklon
- UR-200

=== Related developments ===
- R-7 Semyorka
- Vostok rocket
- Voskhod rocket
- Molniya rocket
- Soyuz rocket

=== Associated spacecraft ===
- ASAT
