= R-7A Semyorka =

Soviet ICBM

- A 2-view diagram of the R-7A Semyorka, with parts of the R-7 shown for comparison.
- Function: ICBM
- Country of origin: USSR

Associated rockets
- Family: R-7

Launch history
- Status: Retired
- Launch sites: Baikonur, Sites 1/5 & 31/6; Plesetsk, Sites 41/1, 16/2, 43/3 & 43/4
- Total launches: 28
- Success(es): 25
- Failure(s): 3
- First flight: 23 December 1959
- Last flight: 25 July 1967

The R-7A Semyorka, GRAU index 8K74, was an early Soviet intercontinental ballistic missile derived from the earlier R-7 Semyorka. It was the only member of the R-7 family of rockets to be deployed as an operational missile. The R-7A first flew on 23 December 1959, entered service on 31 December of the same year, and was formally accepted on 20 January 1960. It was declared fully operational on 12 September 1960 and was retired from service in 1968.

Twenty eight test launches were conducted with three failures. Most test launches occurred from Sites 1/5 and 31/6 at the Baikonur Cosmodrome. The main operational base for R-7A missiles was Plesetsk Cosmodrome, where four launch pads were used at Sites 41/1, 16/2, 43/3 and 43/4. Baikonur Site 31/6 was also used for operational missiles. Another base near Krasnoyarsk was proposed, but later cancelled.

The R-7A was designed to carry a nuclear warhead; however, there was only one occasion where a live warhead was loaded onto a missile, during the Cuban Missile Crisis. After the missile had been armed, it was rolled out to Site 41/1 at Plesetsk, and would have had a response time of 8-12 hours, should a launch have been ordered. In the event of nuclear war, other missiles would have been armed as required, in accordance with the Soviet policy of storing missiles and warheads separately.
