= SL-4 =

SL-4 may refer to:

- The Voskhod rocket, type 11A57, primarily used between 1963 and 1966
- The Soyuz rocket, type 11A511, used from 1966 to present
