= Vostok (rocket family) =

Series of six crewed and uncrewed Soviet orbiting spacecraft

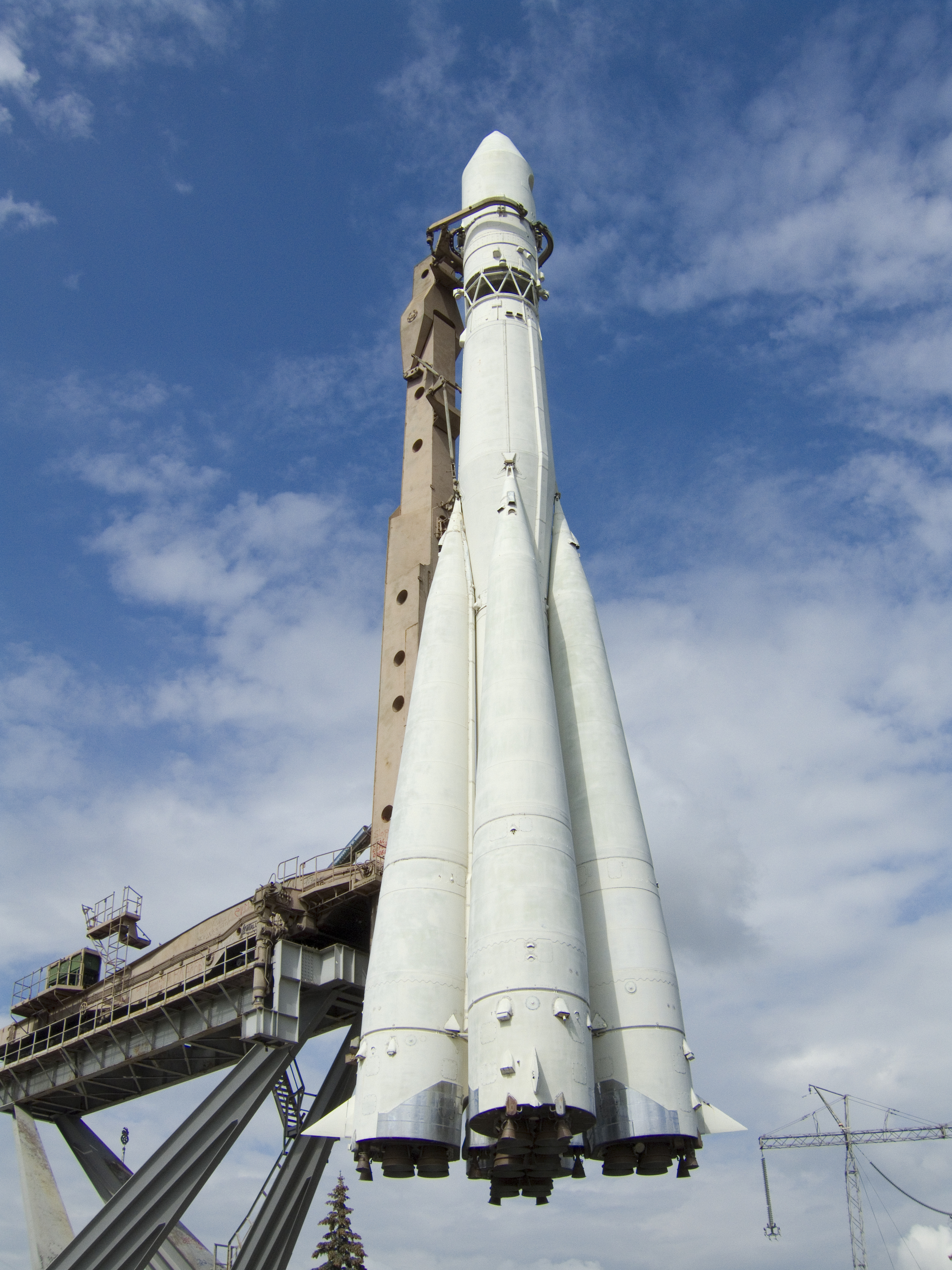
- Vostok 8K72K rocket on display in Moscow at the Exhibition of Achievements of National Economy
- Function: Small-lift launch vehicle
- Manufacturer: OKB-1 / RKTs Progress
- Country of origin: Soviet Union

Size
- Mass: 280,000–290,000 kg (620,000–640,000 lb)
- Stages: 3

Capacity

Payload to LEO
- Mass: 4,725 kg (10,417 lb)

Associated rockets
- Family: R-7
- Comparable: Atlas; Titan

Launch history
- Status: Retired
- Launch sites: Baikonur: LC-1/5, 31/6; Plesetsk: LC-41/1, 43/3, 43/4
- Total launches: Vostok-L: 4 Vostok-K: 13; Vostok-2: 45; Vostok-2M: 94; Soyuz/Vostok: 2
- Success(es): Vostok-L: 3 Vostok-K: 11; Vostok-2: 40; Vostok-2M: 92; Soyuz/Vostok: 2
- Failure(s): Vostok-L: 1 Vostok-K: 2 Vostok-2: 5 Vostok-2M: 2
- First flight: 15 May 1960 (Vostok-L)
- Last flight: 29 August 1991 (Vostok-2M)
- Carries passengers or cargo: Vostok; Zenit; Meteor

Boosters (First stage) – Block B, V, G & D (Note: This is a transliteration of the second through fifth letters of the Cyrillic alphabet (Б, В, Г, Д). A sense-for-sense translation would correspond to the second through fifth letters of the Latin alphabet, 'Block B, C, D & E'.)
- No. boosters: 4
- Powered by: 1 × RD-107-8D74-1959
- Maximum thrust: 970.86 kN (218,260 lb_{f})
- Total thrust: 3,883.44 kN (873,030 lb_{f})
- Specific impulse: 256 s (2.51 km/s)
- Burn time: 118 seconds
- Propellant: LOX / Kerosene

Second stage (core) – Block A
- Powered by: 1 × RD-108-8D75-1959
- Maximum thrust: 912 kN (205,000 lb_{f})
- Specific impulse: 248 s (2.43 km/s)
- Burn time: 301 seconds
- Propellant: LOX / Kerosene

Third stage – Block E (Note: This is a transliteration of the sixth letter of the Cyrillic alphabet (E). A sense-for-sense translation would correspond to the sixth letter of the Latin alphabet, 'Block F'.)
- Powered by: 1 × RD-0109
- Maximum thrust: 54.5 kN (12,300 lb_{f})
- Specific impulse: 326 s (3.20 km/s)
- Burn time: 365 seconds
- Propellant: LOX / Kerosene

Vostok (Russian: Восток, lit. 'East') was a family of rockets derived from the Soviet R-7 Semyorka ICBM and was designed for the human spaceflight programme. This family of rockets launched the first artificial satellite (Sputnik 1) and the first crewed spacecraft (Vostok) in human history. It was a subset of the R-7 family of rockets.

On March 18, 1980, a Vostok-2M rocket exploded on its launch pad at Plesetsk during a fueling operation, killing 48 people. An investigation into a similar – but avoided – accident revealed that the substitution of lead-based for tin-based solder in hydrogen peroxide filters allowed the breakdown of the H_{2}O_{2}, thus causing the resultant explosion.

== Variants ==
The major versions of the rocket were:

- Luna 8K72 – used to launch the early Luna spacecraft
- Vostok-L 8K72 – Variant of the Luna, used to launch prototype Vostok spacecraft
- Vostok-K 8K72K – a refined version of the above. This was the version actually used for human spaceflight
- Vostok-2 8A92 – used for launching Zenit reconnaissance satellites throughout the 1960s
- Vostok-2M 8A92M – modified version for launching Meteor weather satellites into higher orbits.
- Soyuz/Vostok 11A110 – hybrid of Soyuz and Vostok rockets used as an interim for two launches

=== Vostok 8K72K ===
- First Stage — Block B, V, G, D (four strap-on boosters)
  - Gross mass: 43,300 kg
  - Empty mass: 3,710 kg
  - Thrust (vac): 4 x 99,000 kgf (971 kN) = 3.88 MN
  - Isp: 313 seconds (3.07 km/s)
  - Burn time: 118 s
  - Isp(sl): 256 seconds (2.51 km/s)
  - Diameter: 2.68 m
  - Span: 8.35 m
  - Length: 19.00 m
  - Propellants: Lox/Kerosene
  - Engines: 1 x RD-107-8D74-1959 per booster = 4
- Second Stage — Block A (core stage)
  - Gross mass: 100,400 kg
  - Empty mass: 6,800 kg
  - Thrust (vac): 912 kN
  - Isp: 315 seconds (3.09 km/s)
  - Burn time: 301 s
  - Isp(sl): 248 seconds (2.43 km/s)
  - Diameter: 2.99 m
  - Length: 28.00 m
  - Propellants: Lox/Kerosene
  - Engine: 1 x RD-108-8D75-1959
- Third Stage — Block E
  - Gross mass: 7,775 kg
  - Empty mass: 1,440 kg
  - Thrust (vac): 54.5 kN
  - Isp: 326 seconds (3.20 km/s)
  - Burn time: 365 s
  - Diameter: 2.56 m
  - Span: 2.56 m
  - Length: 2.84 m
  - Propellants: Lox/Kerosene
  - Engine: 1 x RD-0109

== Gallery ==
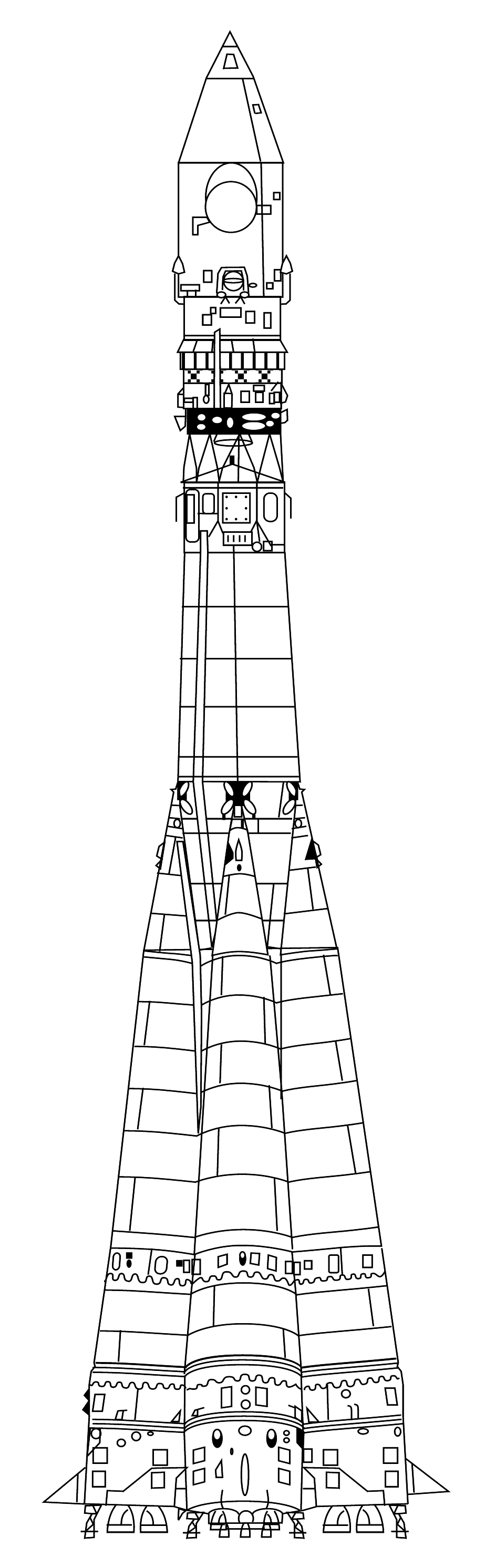
Vostok rocket

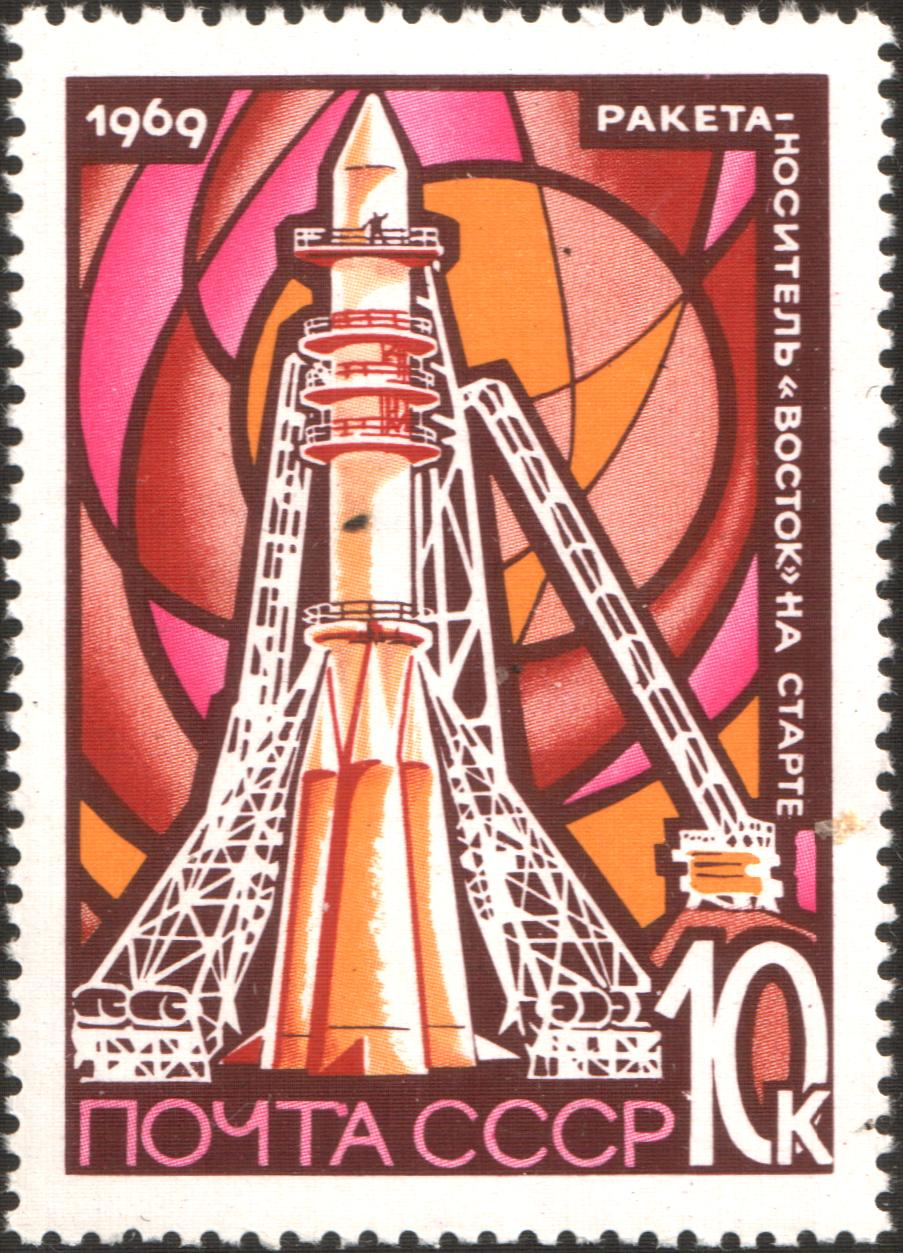
Vostok rocket

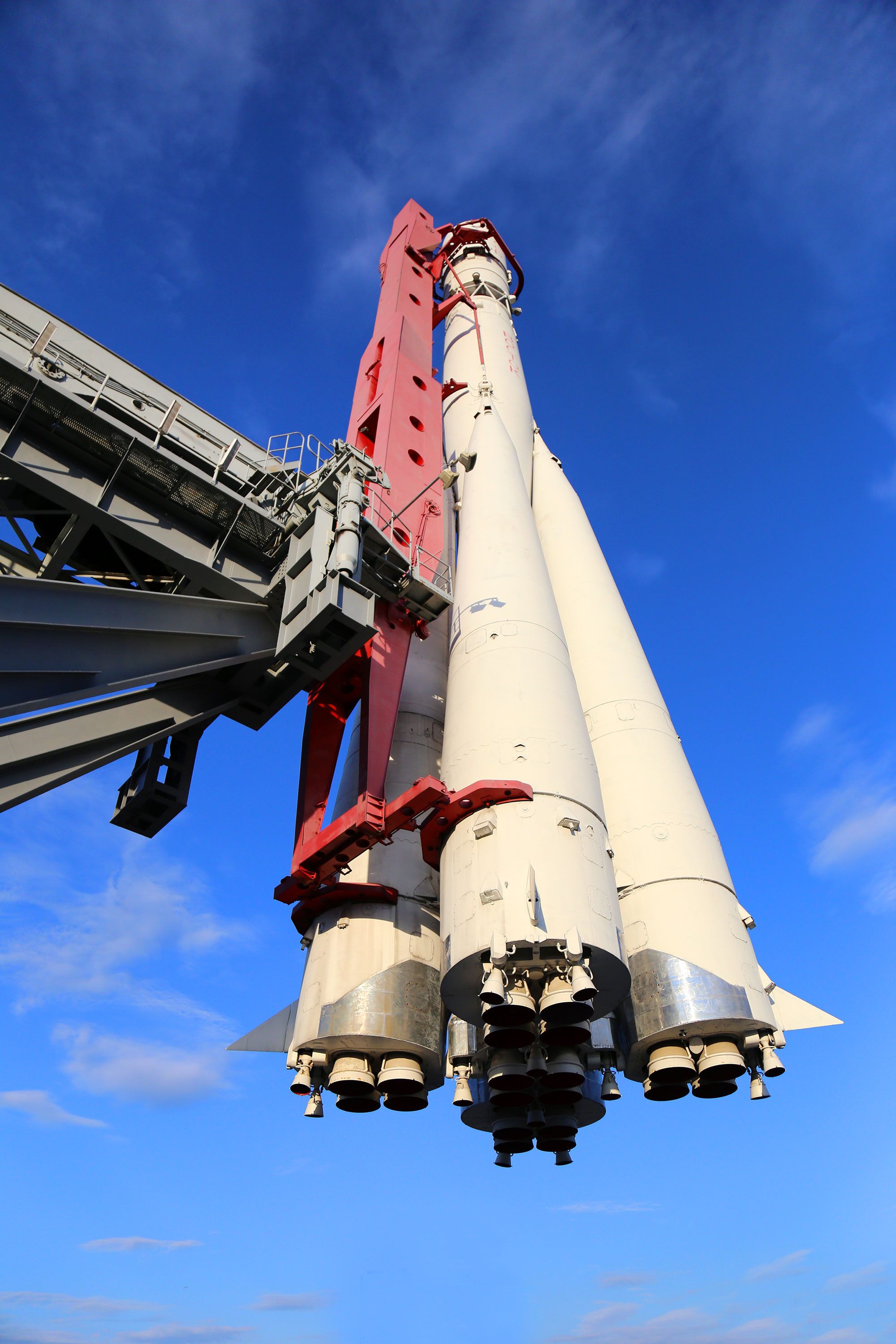
Vostok Rocket, VDNKh, Moscow, Russia

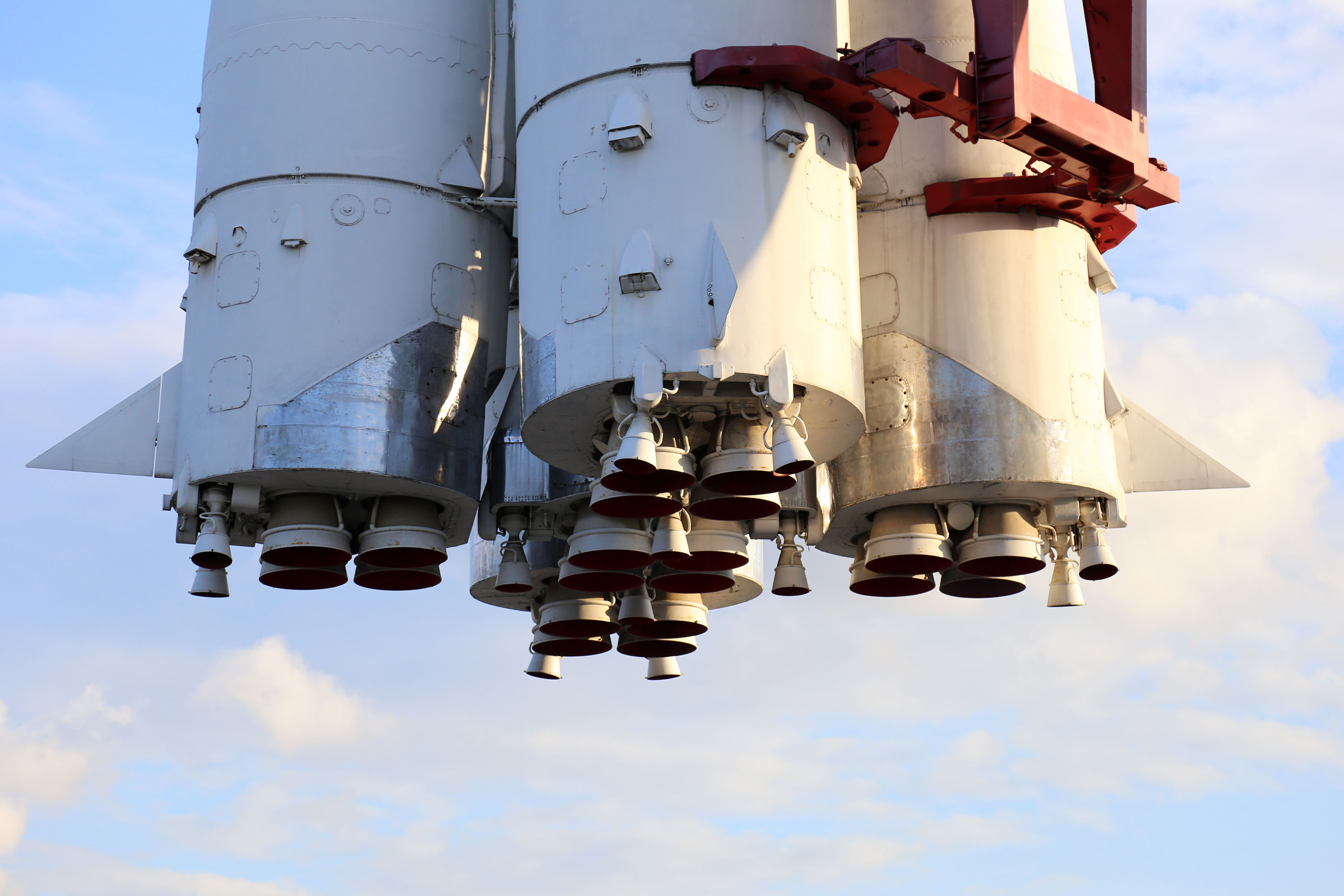
Vostok Rocket, VDNKh, Moscow, Russia

== See also ==
- Vostok 1
- Vostok programme
- Vostok spacecraft
