= Anatoliy Daron =

Russian rocket engineer and scientist (1926–2020)

Anatoliy Davidovich Daron (26 April 1926 – 24 June 2020) was a Russian rocket engineer and scientist, who created the engines for the rockets that delivered the first satellite and the first Soviet cosmonaut, Yuri Gagarin, into space.

Daron made a significant contribution to the development of the first experimental chambers KS-50 and ED-140. He was a leading designer in the development of the RD-107 and RD-108 liquid-propellant rocket engines for the R-7 rocket family, as well as the RD-270 for the UR-700 launch vehicle.

== Biography ==
Daron was born in Odesa, Ukraine to a Jewish family. When he was 12, his family fled Odesa to Kislovodsk during World War II to escape the advance of the Romanian Army.

In 1948, Daron graduated from the Moscow Aviation Institute, specializing in liquid propellant for rockets. He became the lead engineer of the liquid propellant rocket engines of the Experimental Design Bureau No. 456 (OKB-456). He developed the RD-107 and RD-108 for the R-7, providing the Soviet Union with ICBM capability.

Daron's engines were also used for the Sputnik rocket and for all Soviet Union piloted spacecraft; Vostok, Voskhod, and Soyuz. In 1957, he was also part of the Soviet nuclear program.

In 1998, the Russian Federation permitted Daron to go to the United States for heart surgery. He stayed there for the rest of his life.
