= Sputnik 3 =

Soviet satellite

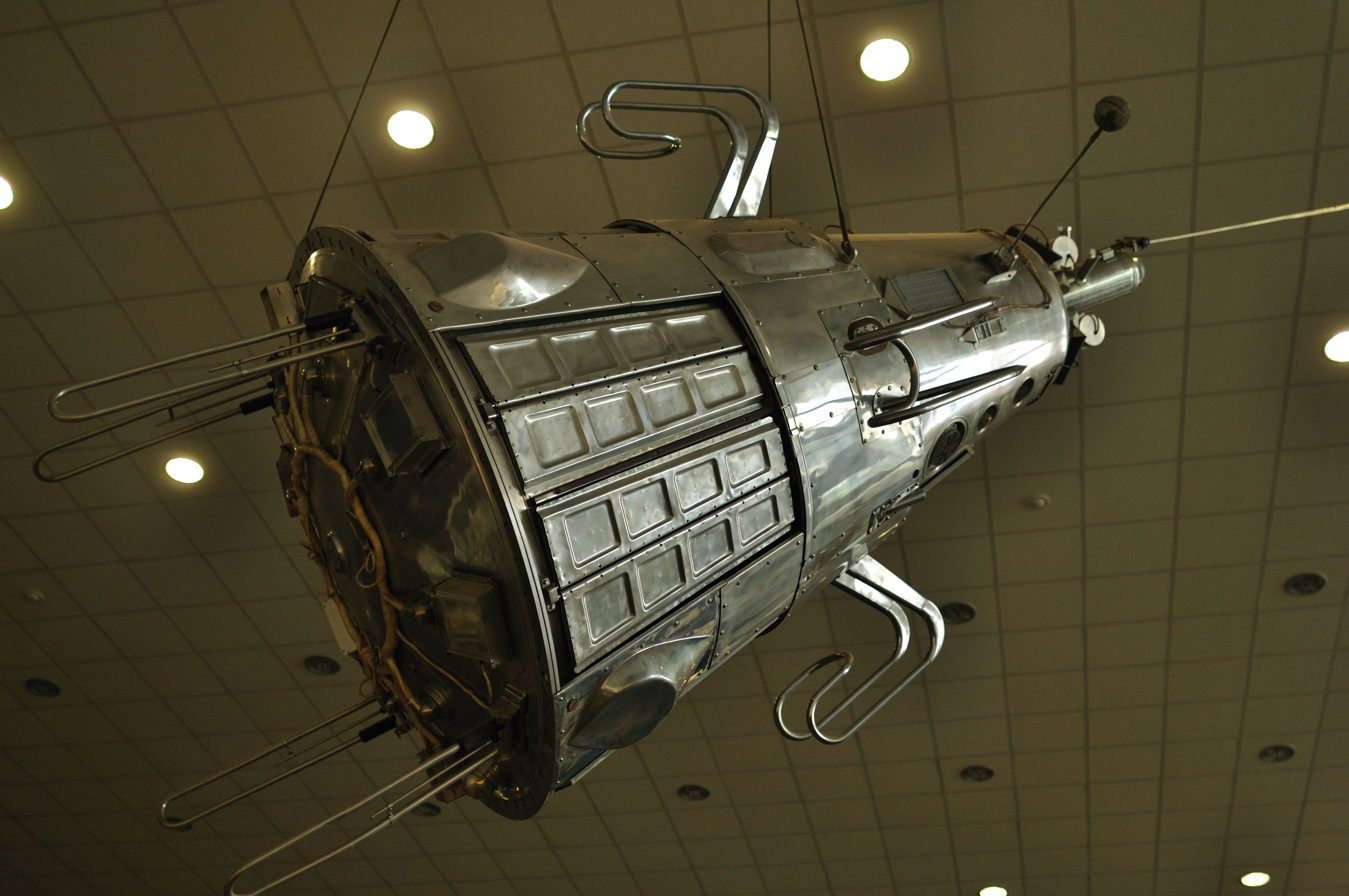
- A model of Sputnik 3 in the Tsiolkovsky State Museum of the History of Cosmonautics
- Mission type: Earth Science
- Operator: OKB-1
- Harvard designation: 1958 Delta 2
- COSPAR ID: 1958-004B
- SATCAT no.: 00008
- Website: NASA NSSDC Master Catalog
- Mission duration: 692 days

Spacecraft properties
- Manufacturer: Korolev Design Bureau
- Launch mass: 1,327 kilograms (2,926 lb)

Start of mission
- Launch date: 15 May 1958, 07:12:00 UTC
- Rocket: Sputnik 8A91
- Launch site: Baikonur 1/5

End of mission
- Decay date: April 6, 1960

Orbital parameters
- Reference system: Geocentric
- Regime: Low Earth
- Semi-major axis: 7,418.7 kilometres (4,609.8 mi)
- Eccentricity: 0.110932
- Perigee altitude: 217 kilometres (135 mi)
- Apogee altitude: 1,864 kilometres (1,158 mi)
- Inclination: 65.18°
- Period: 105.9 minutes
- Epoch: 15 May 1958 07:12:00 UTC

Instruments
Quadrupole Mass Spectrometer	Composition of the upper atmosphere
Ionization and Magnetic Manometer	Pressure of the upper atmosphere
Geiger counters	Charged particles
Piezo-Electric Meteorite Counter	Micrometeoroids
Fluxgate Magnetometer	Magnetic field
Field Mill Electrometer	Electric field

Universal newsreel about the Soviet Union's Industrial Exhibition in 1958 featuring a replica of Sputnik 3

Sputnik 3 (Russian: Спутник-3, Satellite 3) was a Soviet satellite launched on 15 May 1958 from Baikonur Cosmodrome by a modified R-7/SS-6 ICBM. The scientific satellite carried a large array of instruments for geophysical research of the upper atmosphere and near space.

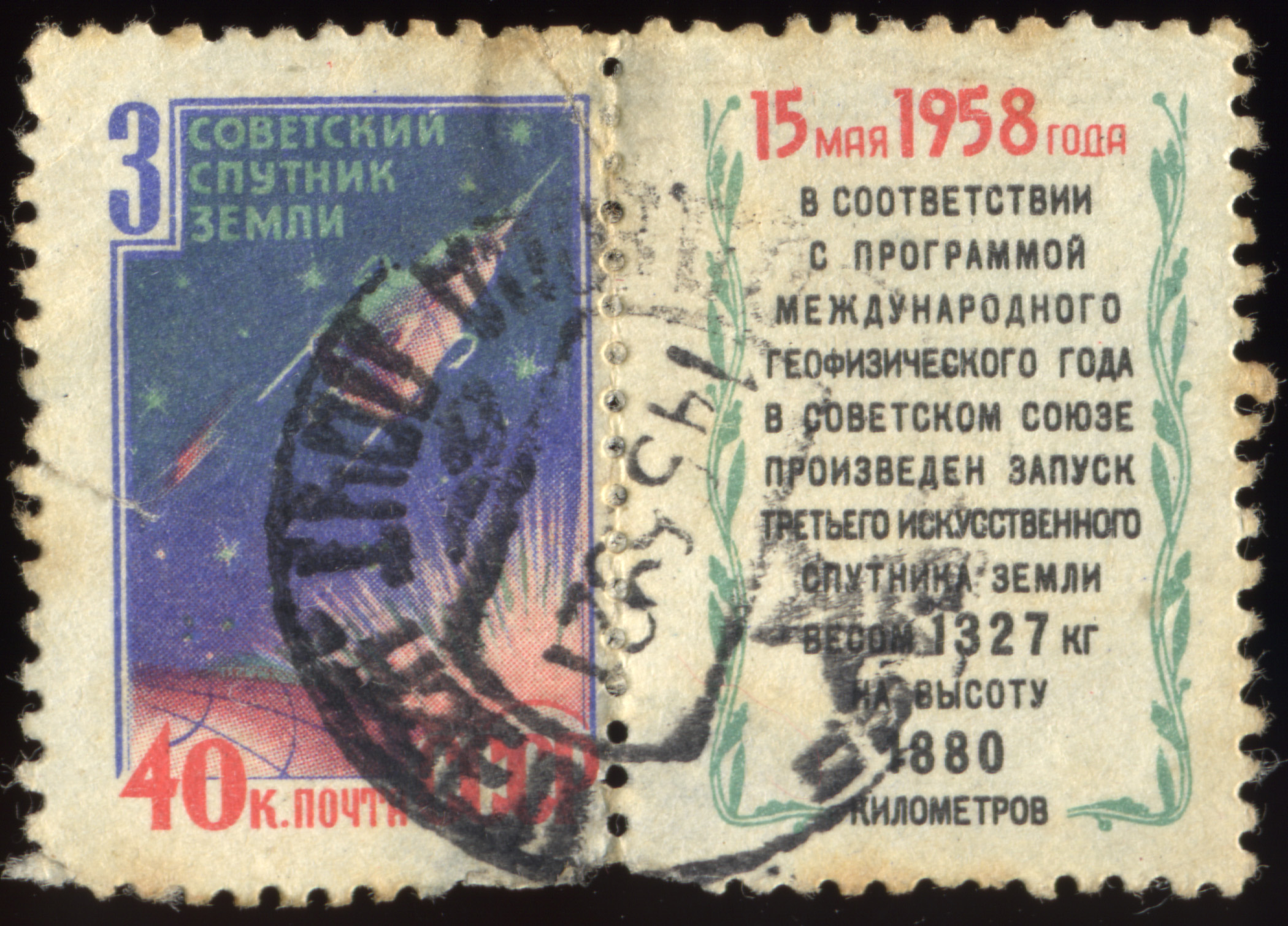
1958 Soviet Union stamp

Sputnik 3 was the only Soviet satellite launched in 1958. Like its American counterpart, Vanguard 1, Sputnik 3 reached orbit during the International Geophysical Year.

== History ==
On 30 January 1956, the USSR Council of Ministers approved a project to launch an artificial Earth satellite using the R-7 rocket. Nicknamed "Object D", it would be the fifth type of payload built for the R-7 intercontinental ballistic missile, also known by its GURVO designation as 8K71. The original plan envisioned a sophisticated laboratory limited to 1,000 to 1,400 kg, of which 200 to 300 kg would be scientific instruments. It was intended to be launched during the International Geophysical Year as the first satellite by the Soviet Union but ended up being the third due to problems developing the extensive scientific experiments and their telemetry system. Despite earlier work done by Mikhail Tikhonravov, much of the satellite's design had little precedent. The creation and use of pressurized equipment, long-range communications systems, automated switches, and a metal construct to work in Earth orbit were all uncharted territories. By July 1956, OKB-1 had completed the preliminary design, but modifications to the R-7 for a satellite launch was ready before Object D could be finished. Worried at the prospect of the United States launching a satellite before he could, Sergei Korolev decided that the relatively simple "Prosteyshiy Sputnik-1" ("Simplest Satellite 1", or PS-1), also known as Sputnik 1, would be the first satellite to be launched instead. Sputnik 2 (PS-2) was also ready and therefore launched earlier than Object D.

== Spacecraft ==
While no Soviet satellite had been in orbit since the end of Sputnik 2 in April 1958, Sputnik 3 weighed about 100 times as much as the heaviest of the three active American satellites, and exceeded their combined scientific-data abilities. It was an automatic scientific laboratory spacecraft. It was conically shaped and was 3.57 m (11.7 ft) long and 1.73 m (5.68 ft) wide at its base. The satellite weighed 1,327 kg (1.46 tons) and carried twelve scientific instruments. After 692 days in orbit and completing thousands of orbits, Sputnik 3 reentered the atmosphere and burned up on 6 April 1960. It was powered by silver-zinc batteries and silicon solar cells.

== Launch ==
Sputnik 3 was launched by a modified R-7 Semyorka missile developed for satellite launches, the Sputnik 8A91.

The 8A91 was a transitional design between the initial 8K71 test model R-7 and the operational 8K74, which had yet to fly. Improvements in manufacturing processes were used to reduce the gauge of the slosh baffles in the propellant tanks and cut down on weight. The engines were slightly more powerful and the changes in mass resulted in modifications to the flight plan--the core stage would be throttled down and the strap-ons throttled up 25% prior to their jettison. An interstage section replaced the radio equipment bay at the top of the booster, and the telemetry package was also moved here.

The launch was planned for 20 April, but technical delays meant that several more days were needed. On 27 April, the 8A91 booster lifted from LC-1 and all appeared normal for over a minute into the launch. Around 1 1/2 minutes, things went awry. The strap-on boosters broke away from the core and the entire launch vehicle tumbled to earth 224 km (139 mi) downrange. Ground crews monitoring radar tracking data from the booster noticed the trajectory angle change to negative numbers, followed by a complete loss of signal. The last data packet received indicated that the booster had flown only 227 kilometers at signal loss.

Telemetry data indicated that abnormal vibrations began affecting the booster at T+90 seconds and vehicle breakup occurred seven seconds later. A search plane located the impact site. It was not clear what had caused the vibrations, but the decision was made to go ahead with the backup booster and satellite. The engines would be throttled down at T+85 seconds in the hope of reducing structural loads. Since the booster did not carry sufficient instrumentation to determine the source of the vibrations, which ultimately proved to be a phenomenon resulting from the propellant tanks emptying, it would end up being a recurring problem on lunar probe launches later in the year.

The satellite had separated from the launch vehicle and was recovered near the crash site largely intact. It was taken back to the Baikonur Cosmodrome for refurbishment, but an electrical short started a fire inside the electronics compartment and it could not be reused.

After this setback, Korolev informed his close associates that a substantial bonus would be forthcoming if the launch crew would stay at the firing range and expedite the preparation of the next R-7.

The backup booster and satellite were launched successfully on the morning of 15 May, specifically chosen as it was the anniversary of the R-7's maiden flight. On the downside, telemetry data indicated that vibration affected the launch vehicle again and it came close to meeting the same fate as its predecessor.

== Mission ==
Sputnik 3 included twelve scientific instruments that provided data on pressure and composition of the upper atmosphere, concentration of charged particles, photons in cosmic rays, heavy nuclei in cosmic rays, magnetic and electrostatic fields, and meteoric particles. The onboard Tral-D tape recorder, intended to store data for later transmission to Earth failed, limiting data to what could be gathered while the satellite was directly visible from ground stations. Because of this failure, Sputnik 3 was unable to map the Van Allen radiation belt. Instead, the unexpectedly high electron counts were interpreted as secondary emission (electrons dislodged from the Sputnik's hull by high energy electrons in the satellite's orbital path).

== See also ==
- Modified R-7/SS-6 ICBM
- List of uncrewed spacecraft by program
- Timeline of artificial satellites and space probes
