= Baikonur Cosmodrome Site 31 =

Roscosmos launch site, Kazakhstan

Coordinates: 45°59′46″N 63°33′51″E

Site 31/6
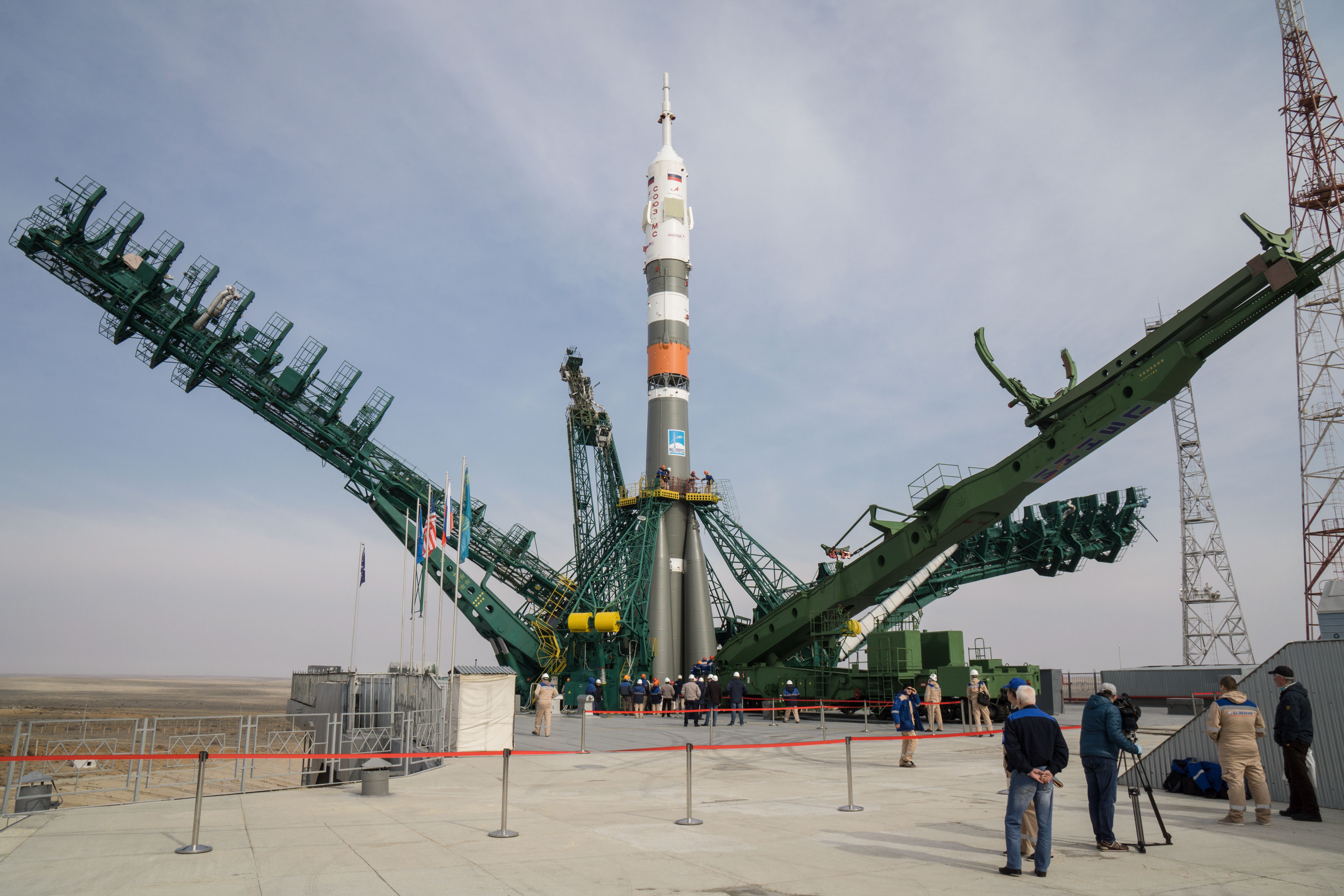
- A Soyuz-2.1a rocket carrying the Soyuz MS-16 spacecraft as it was erected at Site 31/6
- Interactive map of Site 31/6
- Launch site: Baikonur Cosmodrome
- Location: Kazakhstan
- Time zone: UTC+5 (AQTT)
- Operator: Strategic Missile Forces; Russian Aerospace Forces; Roscosmos
- Launch pad: 1
- Orbital inclination range: 49–99°
Launch history
- Status: Active
- Launches: 448
- First launch: 14 January 1961; R-7A
- Last launch: 16 September 2026; Soyuz-2.1b (Progress MS-35)
- Associated rockets: Current: Soyuz-2.1a, Soyuz-2.1b; Retired: R-7A, Vostok, Voskhod, Polyot, Molniya, Soyuz, Soyuz-L, Soyuz-U, Soyuz-U2, Soyuz-FG

Baikonur Site 31, also designated as Site 31/6, is a launch complex at the Baikonur Cosmodrome in Kazakhstan. It supports Soyuz-2 launches for both crewed and uncrewed missions. The site was first utilized on 14 January 1961 for a test flight of the R-7A, an intercontinental ballistic missile on which the Soyuz rocket family was based. Since 2020, following Roscosmos' transition from the Soyuz-FG to the Soyuz-2 rocket for crewed missions, Site 31/6 has become Russia's only operational facility for crewed Soyuz flights to the International Space Station (ISS). This shift occurred after Site 1/5, also known as Gagarin's Start, failed to secure funding for upgrades to accommodate the slightly larger Soyuz-2 rocket. Before that, Site 31/6 only saw a handful of crewed flights when Site 1/5 was unavailable.

== History ==
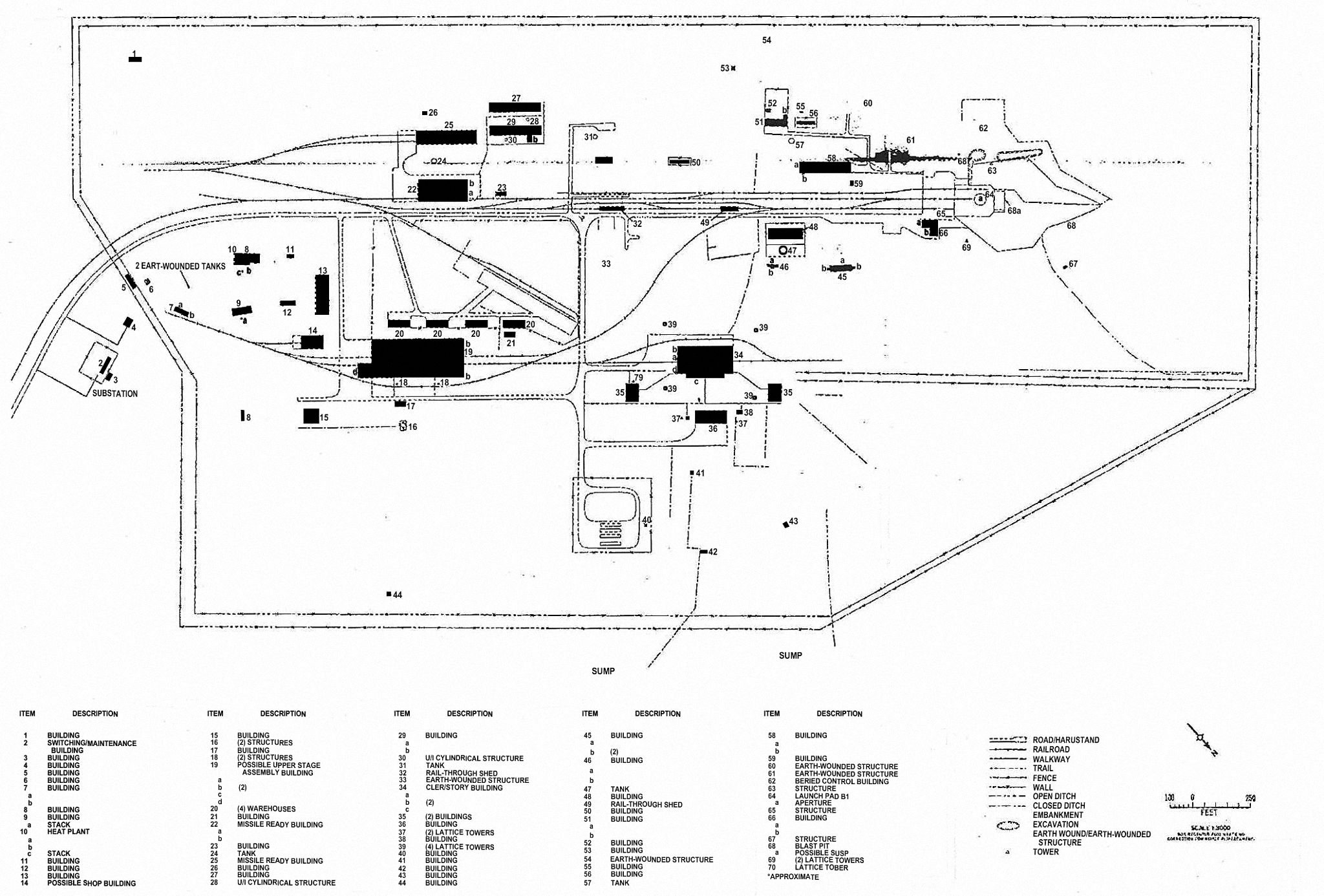
A diagram showing the layout of site 31/6.

=== R-7 launch site ===
Construction of Site 31/6 at Baikonur began in late 1958 as a second launch complex for the R-7 intercontinental ballistic missile (ICBM) at the cosmodrome. The facility was designated as Pad No. 6 for the R-7 programme. The numbering of the sites reflected Baikonur's role as a secondary ICBM base, with the primary being the Plesetsk Cosmodrome, which featured four launch pads.

While Site 1/5 was primarily a test facility, Site 31/6 was designed as an operational "battle station" for the R-7, equipped with specialized infrastructure. This included an assembly building, a processing facility for nuclear warheads, a diesel-powered energy plant, and a nearby residential complex. Drawing on the experience gained during the construction of Site 1/5, engineers made several design improvements for Site 31/6. The flame trench was scaled down, and assembly and support facilities were closer to the launch pad to improve efficiency and streamline operations. Construction was completed by the end of 1960, and the first R-7 ICBM successfully launched from Site 31/6 on 27 February 1961.

=== Spacecraft launch site ===
As the R-7's role as an ICBM diminished, Site 31/6 was repurposed to support spacecraft launches, including those carrying cosmonauts. By 1966, a dedicated fueling station had been established to support crewed spacecraft and satellite operations. The site played a role in preparing early Soyuz spacecraft, including the original Soyuz 7K-OK and the circumlunar 7K-L1 vehicles.

Site 31/6 experienced an on-pad explosion in December 1966 that killed three during the Soyuz 7K-OK No.1 mission. It resumed operations in January 1969, launching the Soyuz 4 mission.

Following the explosion of Soyuz 7K-ST No.16L at Site 1/5 in 1983, Site 31/6 was used again for crewed missions, launching Soyuz T-10, T-11, and T-12 in 1984. Even after the repairs to Site 1/5 were completed, Site 31/6 remained in use as a backup, hosting 12 of the 100 Russian crewed launches by 2006.

=== Soyuz-2 upgrades ===
Site 31/6 was selected to receive upgrades to accommodate the larger, modernized Soyuz-2 rocket. This work was completed between 2007 and 2008, and included overhauling the fuelling system, building a modernized flight control bunker, and air-conditioning and communications systems to support payload integration. Launches from Site 31/6 resumed in 2009 with Progress M-66, followed by Progress M-07M in 2010 and Progress M-15M in 2012. In 2012, crewed launches resumed with the successful liftoff of Soyuz TMA-06M, following the completion of further upgrades. While Roscosmos had originally planned to upgrade Site 1/5 to support Soyuz-2 launches, that plan was eventually cancelled, leaving Site 31/6 as Russia's only operational crewed launch facility.

=== Service platform collapse ===
The launch pad at Site 31/6 was damaged on 27 November 2025 during the launch of Soyuz MS-28 to the International Space Station. Images released after liftoff showed the mobile service platform collapsed into the flame trench beneath the pad, temporarily rendering Russia's only operational crewed launch facility unusable and forcing the postponement of the next planned launch from the site, Progress MS-33.

The replacement platform had reportedly been ordered in 1971 and delivered from the New Kramatorsk Machinebuilding Factory in Ukraine to Baikonur in 2013 after decades in storage. Believed to be an older version, its installation required significant modifications. The platform was installed at Site 31 by 10 February 2026. According to Roscosmos, approximately 150 workers prepared and repainted 2,350 square metres (25,300 sq ft) of metal, replacing attachment hardware, upgrading and calibrating electrical systems, and inspecting or servicing all mechanisms. The most complex phase involved installing elements up to 19 metres (62 ft) in length and weighing as much as 17 tonnes (37,000 lb).

On 3 March 2026, Roscosmos reported that repairs had been completed, with Progress MS-33 rescheduled for launch on 22 March 2026.

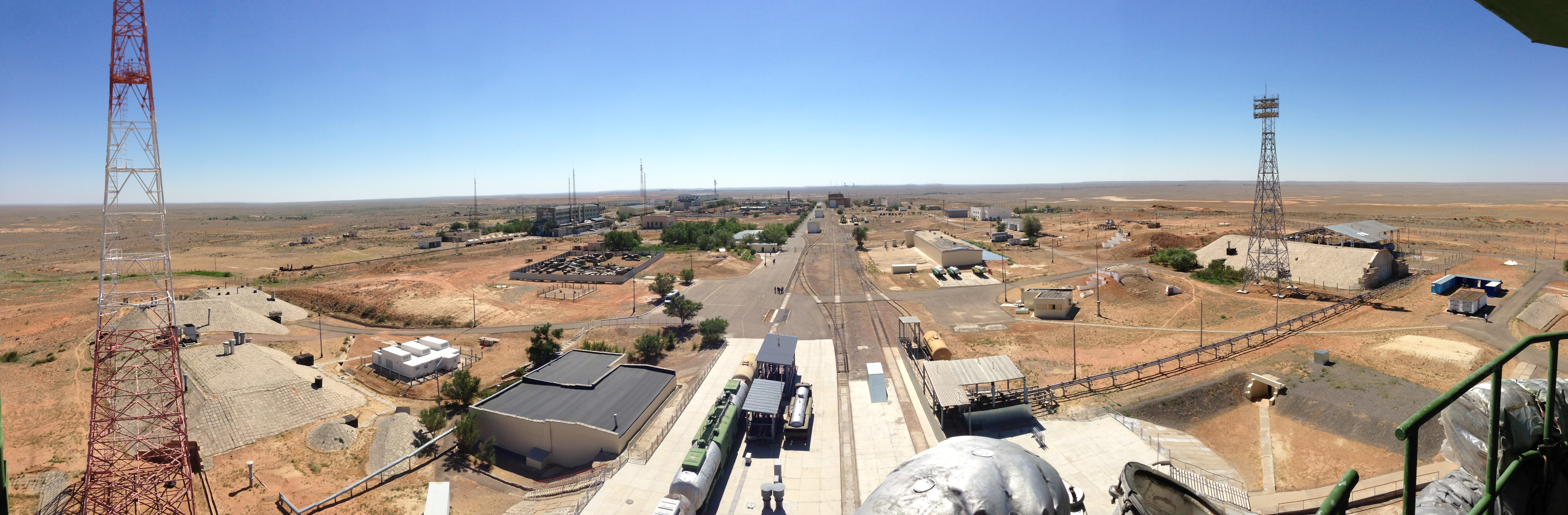
A panorama of the Baikonur Cosmodrome Site 31 taken from atop the Soyuz support structure. Zenit launch pad can be seen in the distance.
