= RD-107 =

Russian rocket engine

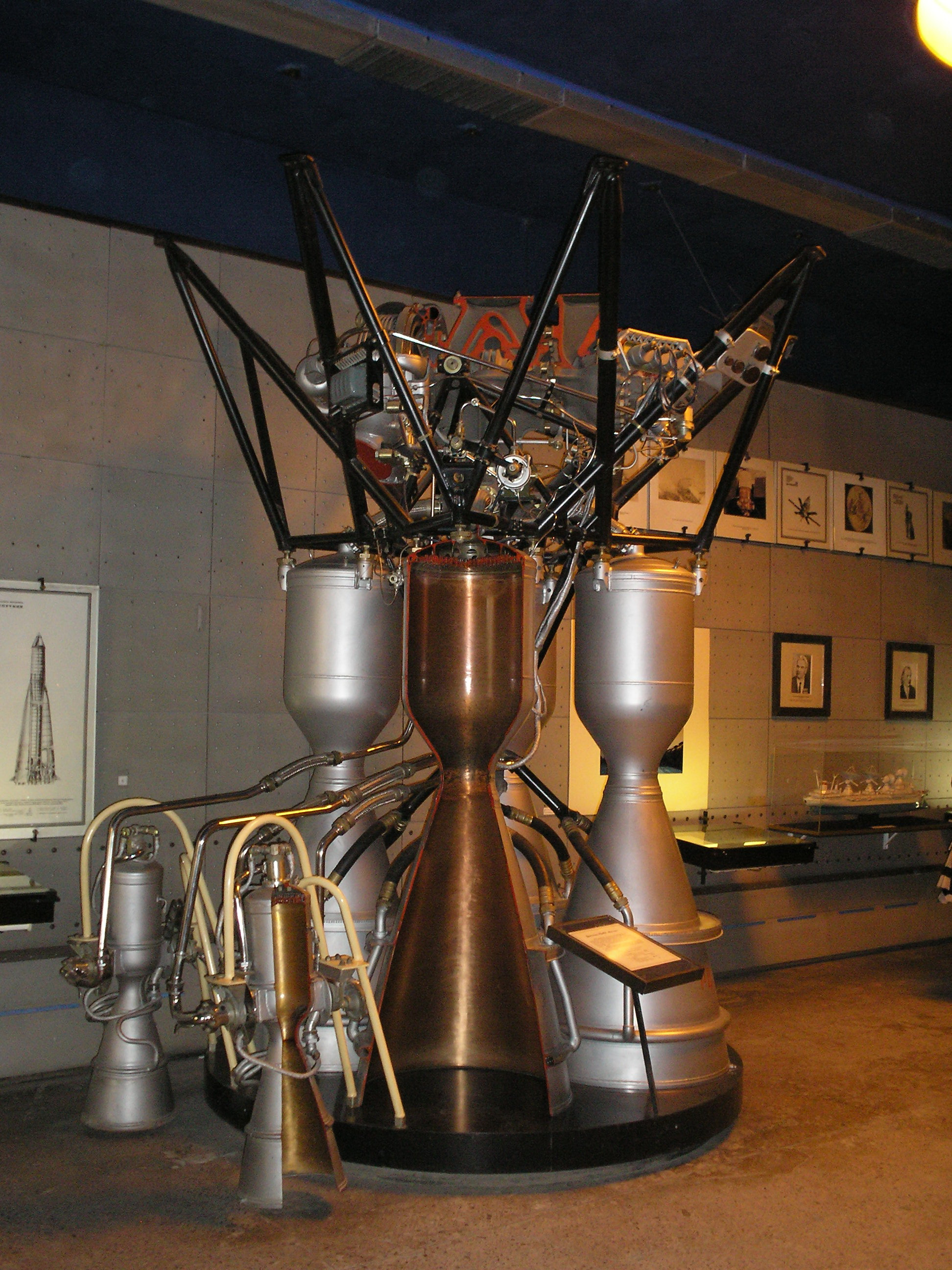
- RD-107 engine on display at the Museum of Space and Missile Technology in Saint Petersburg.
- Country of origin: Soviet Union; Russia
- Designer: OKB-456
- Manufacturer: JSC Kuznetsov
- Application: Booster/first stage
- Associated LV: R-7 family
- Predecessor: RD-105
- Status: In production

Liquid-fuel engine
- Propellant: LOX / RG-1
- Cycle: Gas-generator

Performance
- Thrust, vacuum: 1,020 kN (230,000 lb_{f})
- Thrust, sea-level: 839 kN (189,000 lb_{f})
- Specific impulse, vacuum: 320.2 s (3.140 km/s)
- Specific impulse, sea-level: 263.3 s (2.582 km/s)

Dimensions
- Dry mass: 1,190 kg (2,620 lb)

References
- Notes: Performance figures are for RD-107A

The RD-107 (Russian: Ракетный Двигатель-107, romanized: Raketnyy Dvigatel-107, lit. 'Rocket Engine 107') and its sibling, the RD-108, are a type of rocket engine used on the R-7 rocket family. RD-107 engines are used in each booster and the RD-108 is used in the central core. The engines have four main combustion chambers (each with a nozzle) and either two (RD-107) or four (RD-108) vernier chambers.

The engines were first developed in the mid-1950s to launch the R-7 Semyorka, the first intercontinental ballistic missile. The R-7 was later adapted into space launch vehicles and the engines have been improved over several generations. The most recent versions are the RD-107A and RD-108A engines are used to launch the Soyuz-2, which is in active service as of 2024. An unusual feature of these engines is the turbines, driven by the catalytic decomposition of H_{2}O_{2}.

== Design ==
Turbopump schematic of the NPO Energomash RD-107 rocket engine.

The RD-107 was designed under the direction of Valentin Glushko at the Experimental Design Bureau (OKB-456) between 1954 and 1957. It uses liquid oxygen and highly refined kerosene (RG-1) as propellants operating in a gas-generator cycle. As was typical by all the descendants of the V-2 rocket technology, the turbine is driven by steam generated by catalytic decomposition of H_{2}O_{2}. The steam generator uses solid F-30-P-G catalyst. This consists of variable-sized porous oxidized iron pellets, half of which are coated in a mixture of potassium permanganate and sodium. Each engine uses four fixed main combustion chambers. The RD-107 has an additional two vernier combustion chambers that can thrust vector in a single plane to supply attitude control. The RD-108 has four verniers to supply full vector control to the Blok-A stage. The single-axle turbopump unit includes the steam driven turbine, an oxidizer pump, a fuel pump, and a nitrogen gas generator for tank pressurization.

The RD-107 engines are used in each of the boosters of the Soyuz-2 rocket, and a single RD-108 is used in the Blok-A stage (the central 1st stage).

One important innovation of this engine was the capability to use variable mixture ratio between fuel and oxidizer. The natural variations in manufacturing between each engine meant that without an active propellant consumption control, each booster could deplete oxygen and fuel at a different rate. This might result in as much as tens of tonnes of unused propellant near the end of the burn. It would generate enormous stress on the structure and cause difficulties in steering due to the mass imbalance. The mixture ratio control system was developed to ensure the simultaneous consumption of propellant mass among the four R-7 boosters.

== Production ==
The RD-107 and RD-108 engines are produced at the JSC Kuznetsov plant in Samara, Russia, under the supervision of the Privolzhskiy branch of NPO Energomash, also known as the Volga branch. The Privolzhsky branch was organized as a branch of OKB-456 in 1958, specifically for the manufacture of RD-107 and RD-108 engines. The branch was led by Y.D. Solovjev until 1960, then by R.I. Zelenev until 1975, then by A.F. Udalov until 1978, and is currently led by A.A. Ganin.

== Versions ==
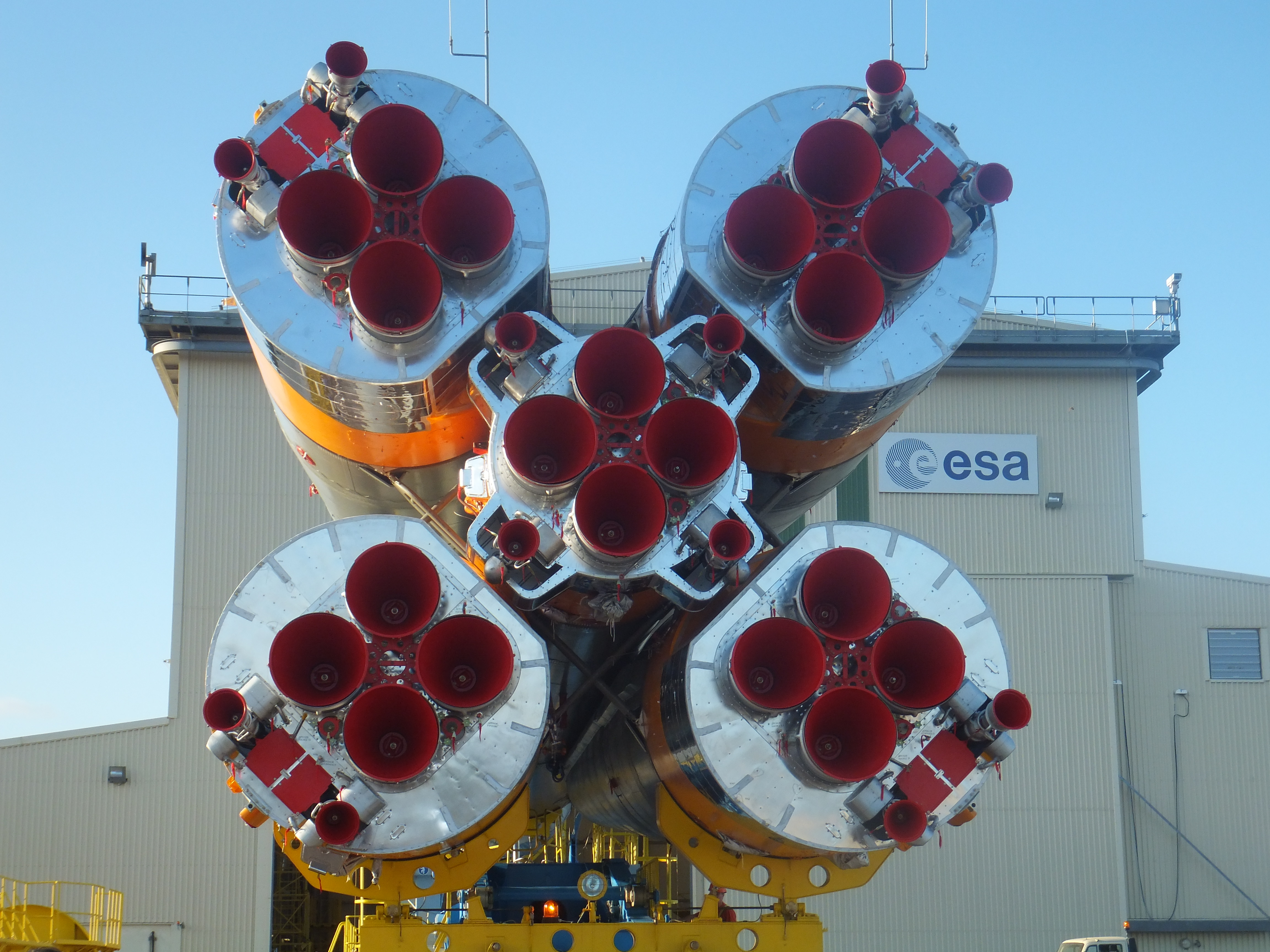
Bottom of the Soyuz-2 showing the RD-107 engines in each booster and the RD-108 on the central core. Each has four nozzles and either two (RD-107) or four (RD-108) vernier nozzles.

=== RD-107 variants ===
Modifications to the RD-107 design have led to production of several distinct versions of the engine:

- RD-107 (GRAU index: 8D74): Original version. Used on ICBM versions of the R-7, Sputnik, Luna, and Vostok rockets.
- RD-107K (GRAU index: 8D74K): Improved version of the RD-107. Used on the Molniya, Vostok-2, Vostok-2M, and Voskhod rockets.
- RD-107MM (GRAU index: 8D728 or 8D74M): Increased thrust over the RD-107K by 5%. Used on the Molniya-M and Soyuz universally adopted on R-7 vehicles in 1966.
- RD-117 (GRAU index: 11D511): Improved structural changes. Used on the Soyuz-U and Soyuz-U2 rockets.
- RD-107А (GRAU index: 14D22): Improved version of the RD-117 with new injector design. Replaced 260 two-component centrifugal injectors with more than a thousand one-component injectors that provided finer aeration of propellant for more thorough burning, reducing high-frequency vibrations inside the combustion chambers and increasing specific impulse by about 5 seconds (0.049 km/s), or five percent. Used on the Soyuz-FG, Soyuz-ST-A and Soyuz-ST-B rockets.
- RD-107А (GRAU index: 14D22KhZ): Chemical ignited version of the RD-107A. Used on the Soyuz-2.1a and Soyuz-2.1b rockets.

RD-107 family of engines
Engine	RD-107	RD-107K	RD-107MM	RD-117	RD-107A	RD-107A
GRAU index	8D74	8D74K	8D728 / 8D74M	11D511	14D22	14D22KhZ
Development	1954–1959	Unknown	1965–1976	1969–1975	1993–2001	2001–2004
Engine cycle	Liquid propellant rocket engine burning RG-1/LOX in a gas-generator cycle with the turbine driven by steam generated by catalytic decomposition of H_{2}O_{2}					
Nozzles	Four main combustion chambers and two vernier thruster combustion chambers for attitude control					
Combustion chamber pressure	5.88 MPa (853 psi)	5.88 MPa (853 psi)	5.85 MPa (848 psi)	5.32 MPa (772 psi)	6 MPa (870 psi)	
Thrust, at sea level	813.98 kN (182,990 lbf)	818.88 kN (184,090 lbf)	755.14 kN (169,760 lbf)	778.68 kN (175,050 lbf)	839.48 kN (188,720 lbf)	
Thrust, in vacuum	1,000.31 kN (224,880 lbf)	995.41 kN (223,780 lbf)	921.86 kN (207,240 lbf)	Unknown	1,019.93 kN (229,290 lbf)	
Specific impulse, at sea level	256 s (2.51 km/s)	256.2 s (2.512 km/s)	257 s (2.52 km/s)	253 s (2.48 km/s)	263.3 s (2.582 km/s)	
Specific impulse, in vacuum	313 s (3.07 km/s)	313.3 s (3.072 km/s)	314 s (3.08 km/s)	316 s (3.10 km/s)	320.2 s (3.140 km/s)	
Height	2,865 mm (112.8 in)				2,578 mm (101.5 in)	
Diameter	1,850 mm (73 in)					
Intended use	R-7; Sputnik; Vostok; Voskhod	Molniya	Molniya-M; Soyuz	Soyuz-U; Soyuz-U2	Soyuz-FG; Soyuz‑ST‑A; Soyuz‑ST‑B	Soyuz‑2.1a; Soyuz‑2.1b
Status	Retired	Retired	Retired	Retired	Retired	In production
Ignition	Pyrotechnic					Hypergolic
References	Unless otherwise noted:					

=== RD-108 variants ===
Similar modifications have led to several distinct versions of the RD-108:

- RD-108 (GRAU index: 8D75): Original version. Used on the R-7, Sputnik, Vostok and Voskhod rockets.
- RD-108K (GRAU index: 8D75K): Improved version of the RD-108. Used on the Molniya rocket.
- RD-108MM (GRAU index: 8D727 or 8D75M): Increased thrust over the RD-108K by 5%. Used on the Molniya-M and Soyuz rockets.
- RD-118 (GRAU index: 11D512): Improved structural changes. Used on the Soyuz-U rocket.
- RD-118PF (GRAU index: 11D512PF): Variant of the RD-118 optimized to run on Syntin fuel rather than RG-1. It used selected injectors to minimize instabilities without changing constructions methods, but it required a significant number of engines produced to get injectors that complied with the stringent specifications. Used on the Soyuz-U2 rocket.
- RD-108A (GRAU index: 14D21): Improved version of the RD-118 with new injector design. Replaced 260 two-component centrifugal injectors with more than a thousand one-component injectors that provided finer aeration of propellant for more thorough burning, reducing high-frequency vibrations inside the combustion chambers and increasing specific impulse by about 5 seconds (0.049 km/s), or five percent. Used on the Soyuz-FG, Soyuz-ST-A and Soyuz-ST-B rockets.
- RD-108A (GRAU index: 14D21KhZ): Chemical ignited variant of the RD-108A. Used on the Soyuz-2.1a and Soyuz-2.1b rockets.

RD-108 family of engines
Engine	RD-108	RD-108K	RD-108MM	RD-118	RD-118PF	RD-108A	RD-108A
GRAU index	8D75	8D75K	8D727 / 8D75M	11D512	11D512PF	14D21	14D21KhZ
Development	1954–1959	Unknown	1965–1976	1969–1975	1979–1981	1993–2001	2001–2004
Engine cycle	Liquid propellant rocket engine burning RG-1/LOX in the gas-generator cycle with the turbine driven by steam generated by catalytic decomposition of H_{2}O_{2}						
Propellant	RG-1/LOX				Syntin/LOX	RG-1/LOX	
Nozzles	Four main combustion chambers and four vernier thruster combustion chambers for attitude control						
Combustion chamber pressure	5.10 MPa (740 psi)	5.10 MPa (740 psi)	5.32 MPa (772 psi)	5.85 MPa (848 psi)	5.39 MPa (782 psi)	5.44 MPa (789 psi)	
Thrust, at sea level	745.33 kN (167,560 lbf)	745.33 kN (167,560 lbf)	676.68 kN (152,120 lbf)	818.88 kN (184,090 lbf)	Unknown	792.41 kN (178,140 lbf)	
Thrust, in vacuum	941.47 kN (211,650 lbf)	941.47 kN (211,650 lbf)	833.60 kN (187,400 lbf)	1,000.31 kN (224,880 lbf)	Unknown	921.86 kN (207,240 lbf)	
Specific impulse, at sea level	248 s (2.43 km/s)	248.2 s (2.434 km/s)	253 s (2.48 km/s)	257 s (2.52 km/s)	263.5 s (2.584 km/s)	257.7 s (2.527 km/s)	
Specific impulse, in vacuum	315 s (3.09 km/s)	314.2 s (3.081 km/s)	316 s (3.10 km/s)	314 s (3.08 km/s)	Unknown	320.6 s (3.144 km/s)	
Height	2,865 mm (112.8 in)						
Diameter	1,950 mm (77 in)						
Intended use	R-7; Sputnik; Vostok; Voskhod	Molniya	Molniya-M; Soyuz	Soyuz-U	Soyuz-U2	Soyuz-FG; Soyuz‑ST‑A; Soyuz‑ST‑B	Soyuz‑2.1a; Soyuz‑2.1b
Status	Retired	Retired	Retired	Retired	Retired	Retired	In production
Ignition	Pyrotechnic						Hypergolic
References	Unless otherwise noted:						

Work on the 14D21 and 14D22 engines started in 1986, with a preliminary design completed in 1993. These engines incorporate a new injector head design to increase specific impulse. The first launch of a Progress cargo spacecraft using a launch vehicle equipped with these engines took place in May 2001. The first human spaceflight launch utilizing these engines took place in October 2002.

== See also ==
- Anatoliy Daron
