= R-7 Semyorka =

First Intercontinental ballistic missile

R-7A
- A 2-view drawing of the R-7 Semyorka (NATO code-name SS-6 Sapwood)
- Type: Ballistic missile
- Place of origin: Soviet Union

Service history
- In service: 9 February 1959 – 1968
- Used by: Strategic Missile Troops
- Wars: Cold War

Production history
- Designer: Sergei Korolev
- Designed: From 1953
- Variants: See Variants

Specifications
- Mass: 280 metric tons (280 long tons; 310 short tons)
- Height: 37 m (121 ft)
- Diameter: 10.3 m (34 ft)
- Effective firing range: 8,000–8,800 km (5,000–5,500 mi)
- Warhead: A single KB-11-derived, 5,300–5,500 kg (11,700–12,100 lb), 7.27 m (23.9 ft) diameter, 3 to 5 Mt, thermonuclear warhead
- Engine: 4x jettisonable four-chamber RD-107 engines on boosters each with 2x vernier rocket engines, plus 1x four-chamber RD-108 engine on the central core with 4x vernier rocket engines.: RD-107 4x 907.4 kN (203,992 lbf); RD-108 1x 907.4 kN (203,992 lbf); Vernier 12x 38.259 kN (8,601 lbf)
- Propellant: LOX/T-1
- Steering system: 12x vernier thrusters arranged around the booster clusters and the core engines
- Accuracy: 2.5–5.0 km (1.6–3.1 mi), max. deviation: 10 km (6.2 mi)

The R-7 Semyorka (Russian: Р-7 Семёрка, lit. 'number seven', GRAU index: 8K71) was a Soviet missile developed during the Cold War, and the world's first intercontinental ballistic missile. The basis for the R-7 rocket family, it was adapted into the world's first orbital launch vehicle, Sputnik, and the crewed orbital launch vehicles Vostok. R-7 derivatives are the most launched rocket family ever with over 2,000 flights as of 2026, primarily Soyuz variants.

Developed by OKB-1 under Sergei Korolev, the R-7 used a kerolox propellant, with a 37 meter-tall core stage powered by the four-chamber RD-108 engine, and four boosters each powered by one four-chamber RD-107 engines. It carried a thermonuclear warhead of between three and five megatons, based on the RDS-37 design. The R-7 made 28 launches between 1957 and 1961. A derivative, the R-7A, was operational from 1960 to 1968. Western Cold War espionage did not discover the R-7 until its launch, later giving it the NATO reporting name SS-6 Sapwood. In August 1957, it was first tested successfully, flying 6,000 km from Baikonur Cosmodrome to Kura Missile Test Range.

Up to six R-7 units were operationally deployed from late 1959, by the newly-formed Strategic Rocket Forces, at five launch sites, one launch pad at Baikonur and four at Plesetsk Cosmodrome. The Soviet Armed Forces initially planned to deploy fifty launch pads for the Soviet nuclear forces. However, the missile's preparation time of 20 hours, maximum alert duration of 24 hours due to liquid oxygen usage, and American Lockheed U-2 spy plane flights, made this infeasible; experts have called its ICBM role as a "blunder" and a "monster". Instead it was R-16 ICBM, developed by the OKB-586 bureau under Mikhail Yangel, which was the first Soviet ICBM deployed en masse, with over 200 units by 1965.

Despite its weakness as an ICBM, some American intelligence reports estimated hundreds of R-7s within a few years, beginning fears of a missile gap. The US responded with a Strategic Air Command continuous 24/7 nuclear alert, which lasted another 34 years until 1991, its first ICBM deployment, the SM-65D Atlas, and the deployment of PGM-17 Thor intermediate-range ballistic missiles in the United Kingdom within range of Moscow.

It became the basis for the R-7 family which includes Sputnik, Luna, Molniya, Vostok, and Voskhod space launchers, as well as later Soyuz variants. These produced the bulk of early Soviet Space Race achievements, such as the Luna 2 and Luna 3 Moon probes. Various modifications are still in use and it has become the world's most reliable space launcher.

== Description ==
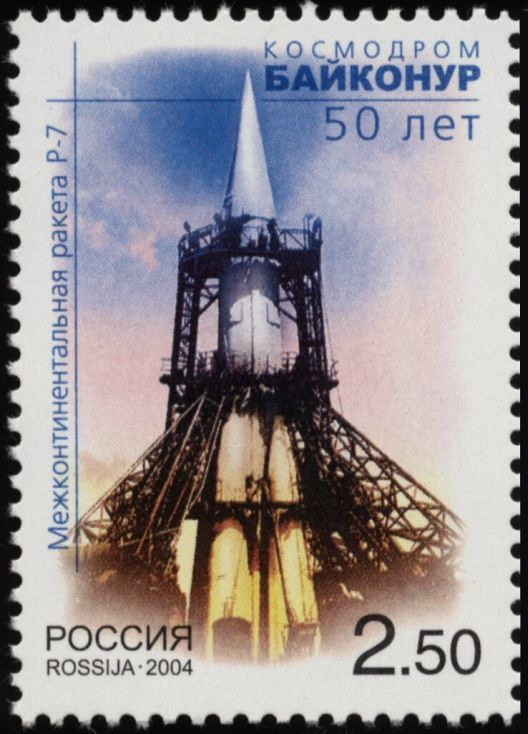
R-7 Semyorka photographed at Baikonur on a Russian stamp from 2004

The R-7 was 34 m (112 ft) long, 10.3 m (34 ft) in diameter and weighed 280 metric tons (280 long tons; 310 short tons); it had a single stage with four strap on boosters powered by rocket engines using liquid oxygen (LOX) and kerosene and capable of delivering its payload up to 8,000 km (5,000 mi), with an accuracy (CEP) of around 5 km (3.1 mi). A single thermonuclear warhead could be carried with a nominal yield of 3 megatons of TNT. The launch was boosted by four strap-on liquid rocket boosters with a central 'sustainer' engine powering the central core. Each strap-on booster included two vernier thrusters and the core stage included four. The guidance system was inertial with radio control of the vernier thrusters.

The widely used nickname for the R-7 launcher, "Semyorka", is a rough translation of "old number seven" in Russian.

== Development ==
R-7 prototype

Design work began in 1953 at OKB-1 in Kaliningrad in Moscow Oblast (presently Korolyov, Moscow Oblast) and other divisions with the requirement for a missile with a launch mass of 170 to 200 tons, range of 8,500 km and carrying a 3,000 kg (6,600 lb) nuclear warhead, powerful enough to launch a nuclear warhead against the United States. In late 1953 the warhead's mass was increased to 5.5 to 6 tons to accommodate the then planned thermonuclear bomb. On 20 May 1954 the USSR Council of Ministers approved the development of the R-7.

The principle of a staged missile, also known as a "rocket packet", was first proposed by Mikhail Tikhonravov at NII-4 in 1947. Korolev became aware of this proposal in 1948 and supported further base studies at NII-4 in 1949–50. This was further refined by Dmitry Okhotsimsky's Department of Applied Mathematics in 1951 and expanded by Korolev's OKB-1 in 1952–53, which concluded that a core and four strap on boosters as the preferred model, which the R-7 used.

To lift the 5.5 ton payload required a redesign of the existing RD-105 and RD-106 engines. Valentin Glushko's OKB-456 combined four combustion chambers using a single turbo pump, which provided a cumulative higher thrust than a single engine. Other advantages included an overall lower engine weight and simpler design, test and construction, via standardisation. The main engines for the central core and strap on boosters all used the four combustion chamber configuration. The four strap on propulsion engines were powered by the RD-107 engine providing a sea level thrust of 83 tons, each with two vernier engines to assist with steering. The central core's RD-108 engine provided sea level thrust of 75 tons and included four vernier engines utilized for steering.

The rocket had some key features to it that made it unique. Instead of using jet vanes for control, which increased resistance generated at the engine nozzle exhaust outlet, the R-7 used special control engines for steering. These same engines served as the last stage's vernier thrusters. Because of clustered design, each booster had its own propellant tanks. The design team had to develop a system to regulate the propellant component consumption ratio and to synchronize the consumption between the boosters.

Instead of a free-standing missile which was launched from a horizontal pad, it turned out that assembling a cluster of a central core and four boosters on the pad is almost impossible without it falling apart. Also, a wind gust could knock the unfuelled missile off of the pad. The solution was to eliminate the pad and to suspend the entire rocket in the trusses that bear both vertical weight load as well as horizontal wind forces. The launch system simulated flight conditions with strap-on boosters pushing the central core forward.

== Testing ==
The existing testing site at Kapustin Yar was inadequate for the testing required for the R-7. Therefore a new site in Kazakhstan that would eventually become the Baikonur Cosmodrome was approved on 12 February 1955.

In the event of a launch malfunction, it would be necessary to shut down the propulsion system to prevent a malfunctioning missile from landing in a populated location. Originally, a setup similar to the flight termination system on American missiles was considered; this involved placing explosive charges on the core and strap-ons and detonating them after an in-flight missile break-up. It was also thought of having a ground controller issue a manual cutoff command to the missile. These ideas were discarded in favor of an automated malfunction detection system (AVD) that would monitor missile pitch and yaw angle, turbopump rotation speed, and engine chamber pressure, and send a command to terminate thrust if any of these deviated from their operating parameters. The R-7 would then simply fall and impact the ground. The decision to abandon the explosive charges was made mere days before the initial R-7 test flight. The AVD could not send a cutoff command until a certain point had passed during launch to prevent a pad fallback. The exact timing of this varied widely, but was 12 seconds on the first test missiles--on later R-7 vehicles it could be as long as 50 seconds since different payload and upper stage combinations had different weight and mass, which affected how long it would take to get away from the pad area.

The first series of test commenced when a flight-ready vehicle was delivered on 1 May 1957, and flown on 15 May. At 9:00 PM local time, the first R-7 was launched. The core and strap-ons ignited and the launcher arms released the missile properly. A column of flames appeared at ignition and climbed nearly halfway up the strap-ons but died down as the missile began to lift. It climbed into the night sky and headed downrange. At 103 seconds, the engines shut down and the flight terminated with an impact 400 kilometres (250 mi; 220 nmi) downrange. Initial suspicion was a malfunction of the AVD that resulted in an erroneous cutoff command, but examination of telemetry found that a fire started in the thrust section of the Blok D strap-on. Temperature probes found that the fire went off-scale and at 98 seconds the Blok D lost thrust and broke away from the stack. The unbalanced thrust caused the core and remaining strap-ons to pitch over and trigger the AVD to terminate the flight. Postflight examination found that a fuel feed line had leaked and started a fire in the Blok D at engine start. The R-7 had flown for more than a minute and a half before the Blok D failed and the core stage had performed flawlessly until flight termination. The flight nonetheless demonstrated that the R-7 was aerodynamically sound and would lift and fly. The cause of the fuel line leak was traced to vibration-induced damage caused during rail transport of the missile from the factory at Kuybyshev--ever since 1950, it had been mandated to perform pneumatic testing on R-1 and R-2 missiles to check for potential transport damage, but this step had been forgotten for the R-7. Additional thermal insulation was added to the missile wiring to guard against fire damage. The second missile took three attempts to launch due to a faulty circuit preventing the main LOX valve in the Blok V strap-on from opening and an improperly installed nitrogen purge valve. The fourth attempt on July 12 finally resulted in a launch. This time the R-7 only flew for 38 seconds before it began rolling uncontrollably. The strap-ons broke away from the stack and the AVD sent a command to terminate thrust. Postflight analysis found that an additional instrument was added to the roll stabilization circuit that had caused the malfunction. The exact reason for the failure was unclear, but concluded due to foreign debris causing a short. The instrument was removed on subsequent launches.

The first successful long flight, of 6,000 kilometres (3,700 mi; 3,200 nmi), was made on 21 August 1957 with the missile reaching the target at Kamchatka, however the dummy warhead disintegrated in the upper atmosphere. Five days later, TASS announced that the Soviet Union had successfully tested the worlds's first intercontinental ballistic missile. A second successful test took place on 7 September 1957, with the missile again travelling 6,000 km (3,700 mi; 3,200 nmi). However again the dummy warhead disintegrated in the upper atmosphere. The first series of tests concluded on 10 July 1958.

The second test series incorporating improvements commenced on 24 December 1958 and concluded on 27 December 1959. Seven of the eight test launches were successful. Problems were resolved during these intensive tests and the missile was declared operational on 20 January 1960.

== Operational history ==
A modified version of the missile (8K71PS) launched the world's first satellite into orbit when Sputnik 1 lifted off from Baikonur on 4 October 1957. Sputnik 2 followed on 3 November 1957. Sputnik (8A91) subsequently launched Sputnik 3 on 15 May 1958.

The first strategic-missile unit went on alert status on 15 December 1959 at Plesetsk in the north-west of the USSR. An improved version, the R-7A with a lighter warhead, all inertial guidance system and a range of 12,000 km, became the standard version once it reached operational status on 12 September 1960.

The costs of the system were high, mostly due to the difficulty of constructing in remote areas the large launch sites required. Besides the cost, the missile system faced other operational challenges. With the U-2 overflights, the huge R-7 launch complexes could not be hidden and therefore could be expected to be destroyed quickly in any nuclear war. Also, the R-7 took almost twenty hours to prepare for launching, and it could not be left on alert for more than a day due to its cryogenic fuel system. Therefore, the Soviet force could not be kept on permanent alert and could have been subject to an air strike before launching. These issues meant that the original planned fifty launch complexes were reduced to six, five for strategic forces, Site 31 at Baikonur and Sites 16, 41 and 43 (2 pads) at Plesetsk and one for space launches at Site 1, Baikonur.

The limitations of the R-7 pushed the Soviet Union into rapidly developing second-generation missiles which would be more viable weapons systems, particularly the R-16. The R-7 was phased out of military service by mid-1968.

While the R-7 turned out to be impractical as a weapon, it became the basis for a series of highly successful Soviet expendable space launch vehicles, including Vostok family of launchers, Molniya and Soyuz family of launchers. As of 2025, a modified and modernized version, the Soyuz-2 remains in service, and R-7-based rockets have been launched over 1,840 times. The R-7 is also a record holder in terms of longevity, with more than 50 years of service with its various modifications and is one of the world's most reliable space launchers.

== Operators ==
Soviet Union
The Strategic Missile Troops was the only operator of the Semyorka.

== See also ==
- List of missiles
- R-7 space launchers
- Soviet rocketry
- Timeline of Russian innovation

== Cited sources ==
- Chertok, Boris (2005). Rockets and People Volumes 1–4. National Aeronautics and Space Administration.
- Siddiqi, Asif (2000). Challenge to Apollo : the Soviet Union and the space race, 1945–1974 (PDF). Washington, D.C.: National Aeronautics and Space Administration, NASA History Div.
