= R-7 (rocket family) =

Family of space launch vehicles developed by the Soviet Union (later Russia)

R-7 Semyorka and its variants used as launchers in the early Soviet space program

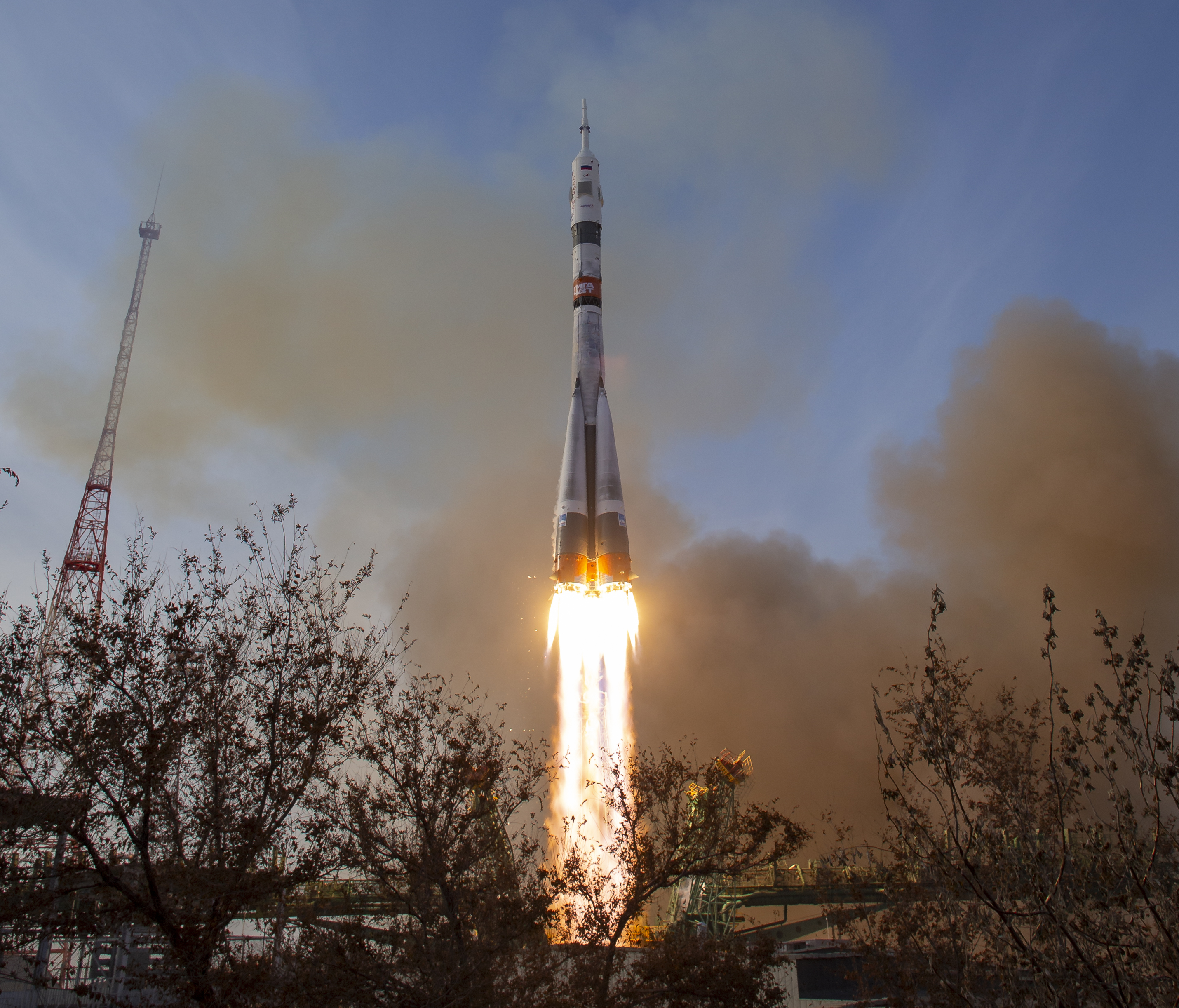
A Soyuz-2.1a launch for Expedition 74 in 2024. It remains a contemporary utilization of the R-7 platform.

The R-7 (Russian: Р-7) rocket family is a series of launch vehicles descended from the Soviet R-7 Semyorka, developed in the 1950s as the world's first intercontinental ballistic missile (ICBM). While the R-7 proved impractical as a weapon, it became a cornerstone of the Soviet and subsequent Russian space programs. Over time, its design was largely standardized into the Soyuz rocket, which continues to operate in its modernized form, the Soyuz-2. More R-7 rockets have been launched than any other family of orbital rockets.

== Background ==
The R-7, developed by OKB-1 in Kaliningrad, a Soviet design bureau led by rocket pioneer Sergei Korolev, was the world's first intercontinental ballistic missile (ICBM). Initially designed to deliver nuclear warheads to American targets, it was first successfully tested on 21 August 1957.

The R-7's basic design comprises a central core stage (Block A) and four strap-on boosters (Block B, V, G, and D), fueled by refined kerosene (RG-1), mixed with cryogenic liquid oxygen (LOX) as the oxidizer. Its stage numbering differs from conventional rockets: the boosters are considered the first stage, and the core stage is the second, though they ignite simultaneously at liftoff. The boosters burn for approximately two minutes before jettisoning, while the core stage continues to burn for about five minutes.

The R-7's impracticality as a weapon became quickly apparent. Its huge launch complexes were vulnerable to attack, the 10 hours it took to prepare for launch hindered its operational readiness, and its reliance on a cryogenic oxidizer meant that it could not be left on alert for more than an hour.

However, due to the weight of Soviet nuclear warheads, the R-7 possessed a significantly greater payload capacity than early U.S. ICBMs. This advantage made the R-7 suitable for space launch missions, giving the Soviet Union a substantial head start in the Space Race. An unmodified R-7 launched Sputnik 1, the world's first artificial satellite. With the addition of upper stages, the R-7 spawned numerous variants, each optimized for specific missions. The Vostok variant carried the first human into orbit, Yuri Gagarin. Other variants, such as Luna, Voshkod, and Molniya, were used for lunar probes, reconnaissance satellites, and communications satellites. Later modifications were standardized around multipurpose Soyuz design, first used in 1966. Its modernized version, the Soyuz-2, continues to serve as a workhorse for the Russian space program.

Production of the R-7 family moved to the Progress Aviation Factory in Samara, Russia, in 1959. Over time, complete responsibility for the entire R-7 family shifted from the main OKB-1 office in Kaliningrad to Samara. The design facilities in Samara evolved from an OKB-1 subsidiary into the independent Central Specialized Design Bureau (TsSKB) in 1974. TsSKB and the Progress factory collaborated on the design, development, and production of Soyuz rockets. In 1996, TsSKB and the Progress factory merged to form a single company, Rocket and Space Centre "Progress" (RKTs Progress).

R-7 rockets are launched from the Baikonur Cosmodrome, Plesetsk Cosmodrome, and Vostochny Cosmodrome and were previously launched from the Guiana Space Centre between 2011 and 2022.

== Summary of variants ==
All the R-7 family rockets are listed here by date of introduction. Most of the early R-7 variants have been retired. Active versions (as of 2022) are shown in green.

Name	GRAU index	Function	N° Stages (Note: Including boosters)	Maiden flight	Final flight	Launches (Note: As of 22 May 2020)			Remarks
Name	GRAU index	Function	N° Stages	Maiden flight	Final flight	Total	Success	Failure (+ partial)	Remarks
R-7 Semyorka	8K71	ICBM	2	15 May 1957	27 February 1961	27	18	9	World's first ICBM
Sputnik-PS	8K71PS	Carrier rocket	2	4 October 1957	3 November 1957	2	2	0	World's first carrier rocket Launched Sputnik 1 and Sputnik 2
Sputnik	8A91	Carrier rocket	2	27 April 1958	15 May 1958	2	1	1	Launched Sputnik 3
Luna	8K72	Carrier rocket	3	23 September 1958	16 April 1960	9	2	7	Launched first Lunar probes
R-7A Semyorka	8K74	ICBM	2	23 December 1959	25 July 1967	21	18	3	The only operational ICBM version. Improved range and guidance system. Only 6 launch positions were available. Used as a base for 11A57 and later mods
Vostok-L	8K72L	Carrier rocket	3	15 May 1960	1 December 1960	4	3	1	Variant of Luna, used to launch prototype Vostok spacecraft
Molniya	8K78	Carrier rocket	4	20 January 1960	3 December 1965	26	12	14	Designed to send payloads out of LEO
Vostok-K	8K72K	Carrier rocket	3	22 December 1960	10 July 1964	13	11	2	Used for crewed Vostok missions First rocket to launch a man into space
Molniya-L	8K78L	Carrier rocket	4	Unbuilt					
Vostok-2	8A92	Carrier rocket	3	1 June 1962	12 May 1967	45	40	5	Used for launching Zenit reconnaissance satellites throughout the 1960s
Polyot	11A59	Carrier rocket	2	1 November 1963	12 April 1964	2	2	0	
Voskhod	11A57	Carrier rocket	3	16 November 1963	29 June 1976	300	277	23	Launched crewed Voskhod 1 and Voskhod 2 missions
Molniya-M	8K78M	Carrier rocket	4	4 October 1965	30 September 2010	297	276	21	Improved version of Molniya
Vostok-2M	8A92M	Carrier rocket	3	28 August 1964	29 August 1991	94	92	2	Modified version for launching Meteor weather satellites into higher orbits
Soyuz/Vostok	11A510	Carrier rocket	4	27 December 1965	20 July 1966	2	2	0	Launched with prototype US-A satellites
Soyuz	11A511	Carrier rocket	3	28 November 1966	24 May 1975	30	28	2	Used for crewed Soyuz launches.
Soyuz-B	11K55	Carrier rocket	3	Unbuilt					
Soyuz-V	11K56	Carrier rocket	3	Unbuilt					
Soyuz-R	11A514	Carrier rocket	3	Unbuilt					
Soyuz-L	11A511L	Carrier rocket	3	24 November 1970	12 August 1971	3	3	0	Created to test the LK lunar lander in LEO
Soyuz-M	11A511M	Carrier rocket	3	27 December 1971	31 March 1976	8	8	0	Built to launch crewed Soyuz 7K-VI spacecraft, eventually used to launch reconnaissance satellites
Soyuz-U	11A511U	Carrier rocket	3 or 4	18 May 1973	22 February 2017	786	765	22	Single most launched carrier rocket ever built Used for crewed Soyuz launches.
Soyuz-U2	11A511U2	Carrier rocket	3	23 December 1982	3 September 1995	72	72	0	Used for crewed Soyuz launches.
Soyuz-FG	11A511U-FG	Carrier rocket	3 or 4	20 May 2001	25 September 2019	70	69	1	Used for crewed Soyuz launches.
Soyuz-2.1a / Soyuz-ST-A	14A14A	Carrier rocket	3 or 4	8 November 2004	Active	75	72	2+1p	Used for crewed Soyuz launches from Soyuz MS-16 on 9 April 2020. In August 2019 the booster lofted the uncrewed Soyuz MS-14 into orbit in order to test the spacecraft on the new rocket.
Soyuz-2.1b / Soyuz-ST-B	14A14B	Carrier rocket	3 or 4	27 December 2006	Active	90	87	2+1p	
Soyuz-2.1v	14A15	Carrier rocket	3	28 December 2013	5 February 2025	13	12	1p	1st stage uses a completely new design utilizing NK-33 engine from the N1 Moon launcher and vernier thrusters RD-0110R without side boosters.

== Korolev Cross ==
The Korolev Cross as observed during the launch of Soyuz MS-27.

The Korolev Cross is a visual phenomenon observed in the smoke plumes of the R-7 series rockets during separation of the four liquid-fueled booster rockets attached to the core stage. As the boosters fall away from the rocket, they pitch over symmetrically due to aerodynamic forces acting upon them, forming a cross-like shape behind the rocket. The effect is named after Sergei Korolev, the designer of the R-7 rocket. When the rocket is launched into clear skies, the effect can be seen from the ground at the launch site.

== See also ==
- 1957 in spaceflight
- List of R-7 launches
- Comparison of orbital launchers families
- Soviet rocketry
