= Gagarin's Start =

Launch site at Baikonur Cosmodrome in Kazakhstan

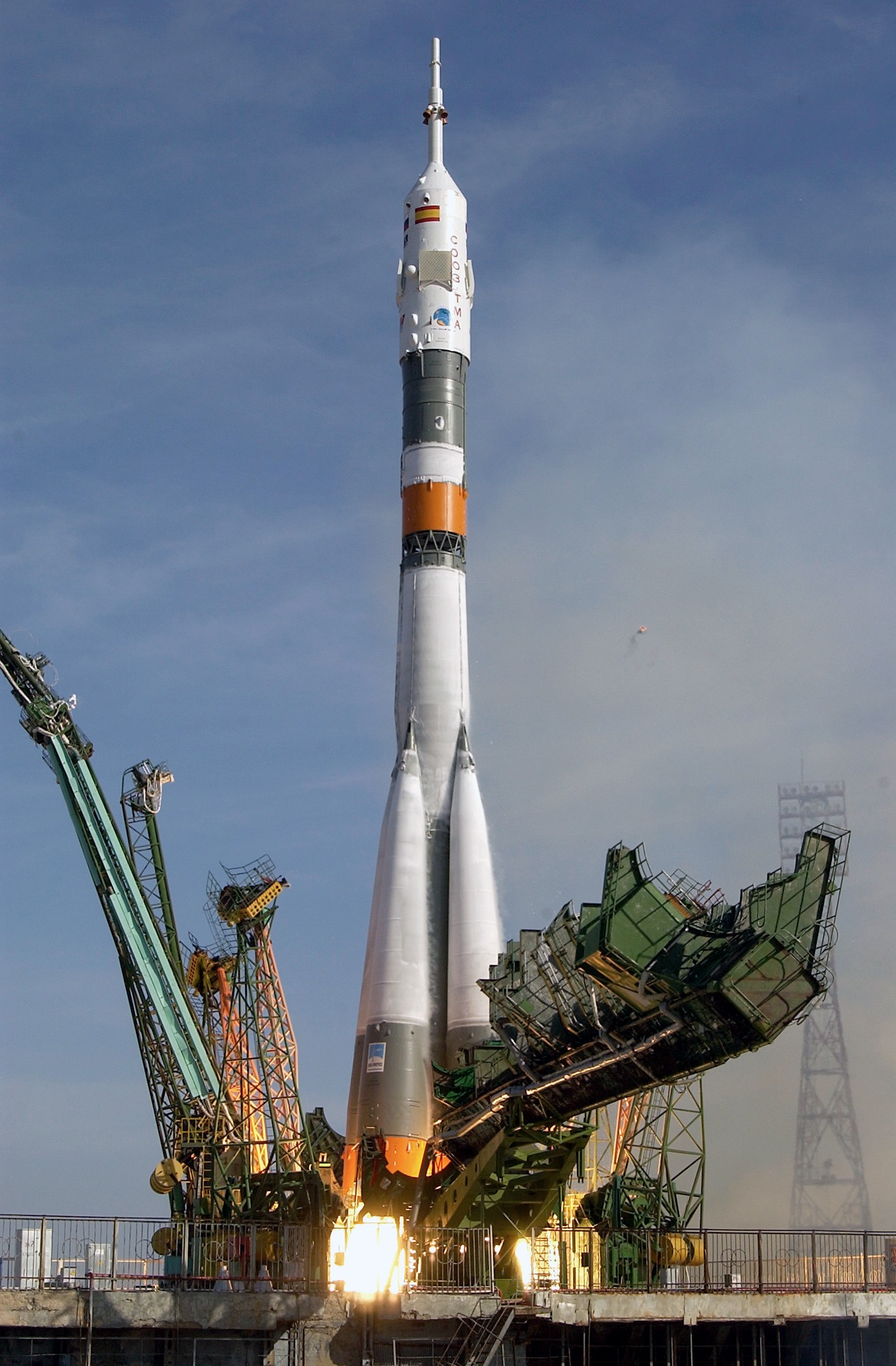
- Soyuz TMA-3 is launched from Gagarin's Start
- Interactive map of Gagarin's Start
- Launch site: Baikonur Cosmodrome
- Location: 45°55′13″N 63°20′32″E
- Short name: LC-1/5
- Operator: Soviet space program, Roscosmos
- Total launches: 520
- Launch pad: 1
- Orbital inclination range: 49° – 99°
Launch history
- Status: Decommissioned
- Launches: 520
- First launch: 15 May 1957; R-7
- Last launch: 25 September 2019; Soyuz-FG / Soyuz MS-15
- Associated rockets: R-7, Vostok, Voskhod, Molniya, Soyuz, Soyuz-U, Soyuz-U2, Soyuz-FG

Gagarin's Start (Russian: Гагаринский старт, Gagarinskiy start) also known as Baikonur Site 1 or Site 1/5 is a retired launch site at the Baikonur Cosmodrome in Kazakhstan that was used by the Soviet space program and Roscosmos.

== History ==
=== 20th century ===
The launchpad for the world's first human spaceflight made by Yuri Gagarin on Vostok 1 in 1961, the site was referred to as Site No.1 (Площадка №1, Ploshchadka No. 1) as the first one of its kind. It is also sometimes referred to as NIIP-5 LC1, Baikonur LC1, LC-1/5, LC-1, Pad 1/5 or GIK-5 LC1.

At Baikonur, site numbers refer to facilities. Site 0 was the construction headquarters and residential area and, as the first major project, this launch pad was named Site 1. Its processing facilities were called Site 2 and its oxygen/nitrogen plant was Site 3. The facility was later designated as Pad No. 5 for the R-7 programme. The numbering of the sites reflected Baikonur's role as a secondary ICBM base, with the primary being the Plesetsk Cosmodrome, which featured four launch pads.

On 17 March 1954, the Council of Ministers ordered several ministries to select a site for a proving ground to test the R-7 rocket by 1 January 1955. A special reconnaissance commission considered several possible geographic regions and selected Tyuratam in the Kazakh SSR. This selection was approved on 12 February 1955 by the Council of Ministers, with a completion of construction targeted for 1958. Work on the construction of Site No.1 began on 20 July 1955 by military engineers. Day and night more than 60 powerful trucks worked at the site; 15,000 cubic metres (20,000 cu yd) of earth were excavated and removed per day, with the total volume estimated to be 750,000 cubic metres (980,000 cu yd). During winter explosives were widely utilised. By the end of October 1956, all primary buildings and installation of infrastructure for R-7 tests were completed. The Installation and Testing Building (Монтажно-испытательный корпус, Montazhno-ispytatel'nyj korpus) named "Site No.2" was built and a special railway completed from there to Site No.1 where the launch pad for the rocket was located. By April 1957, all remaining work was completed and the site was ready for launches.

The R-7 missile made its maiden voyage from LC-1 on 15 May 1957. On 4 October 1957, the pad was used to launch the world's first artificial satellite, Sputnik 1. Crewed spaceflights launched from the site include Yuri Gagarin's flight, Valentina Tereshkova's flight, and numerous other human spaceflight missions, including all Soviet and Russian crewed spaceflights to Mir. The pad was also used to launch Luna program spacecraft, Mars probe program spacecraft, Venera program spacecraft, many Cosmos satellites and others. From 1957 through 1966 the site hosted ready-to-launch strategic nuclear ICBMs in addition to spacecraft launches; by the 2000s there had been more than 400 launches from the site. The 500th launch from this site was of Soyuz TMA-18M on 2 September 2015.

In 1961, the growing launch schedule of the Soviet space program resulted in the opening of a sister pad at Baikonur, LC-31/6. LC-1 was the primary facility for human spaceflight launches, with occasional Soyuz flights from LC-31/6. LC-1 was damaged several times by booster explosions during the early years.

The pad underwent a year-long renovation program in 1969–70 to support Zenit reconnaissance satellite launches; during this time all R-7 launches from Baikonur were carried out from LC-31.

=== 21st century ===
As of 2016, the most recent accident to occur on or around the pad was the attempted launch of Soyuz T-10-1 in September 1983, which ended disastrously when the booster caught fire during prelaunch preparations and exploded, causing severe damage that left LC-1 inoperable for almost a year. The first launch from the rehabilitated pad was a Yantar reconnaissance satellite in July 1984, but it did not host a manned launch again until Soyuz T-13 in June 1985, nearly two years after the Soyuz T-10-1 disaster.

In 2019, Gagarin's Start hosted its last two crewed launches in July and September before its planned modernisation for Soyuz-2 rockets with a planned first launch at 2023. After the retirement of Gagarin's Start, crewed missions are launched from Site 31.

The last launch from Gagarin's Start was the Soyuz MS-15 flight to ISS on 25 September 2019, the first crewed mission from Site 31 since 2012 was Soyuz MS-16 on 9 April 2020.

Gagarin's Start failed to receive funding to modernize it for the slightly larger Soyuz-2 rocket due to the reorientation of Russian space launches to the Vostochny cosmodrome. In 2023, it was announced that the Russian and Kazakhstan authorities plan to deactivate the site as a retired space launch pad and add it to the Baikonur Cosmodrome's museum complex.

== Gallery ==
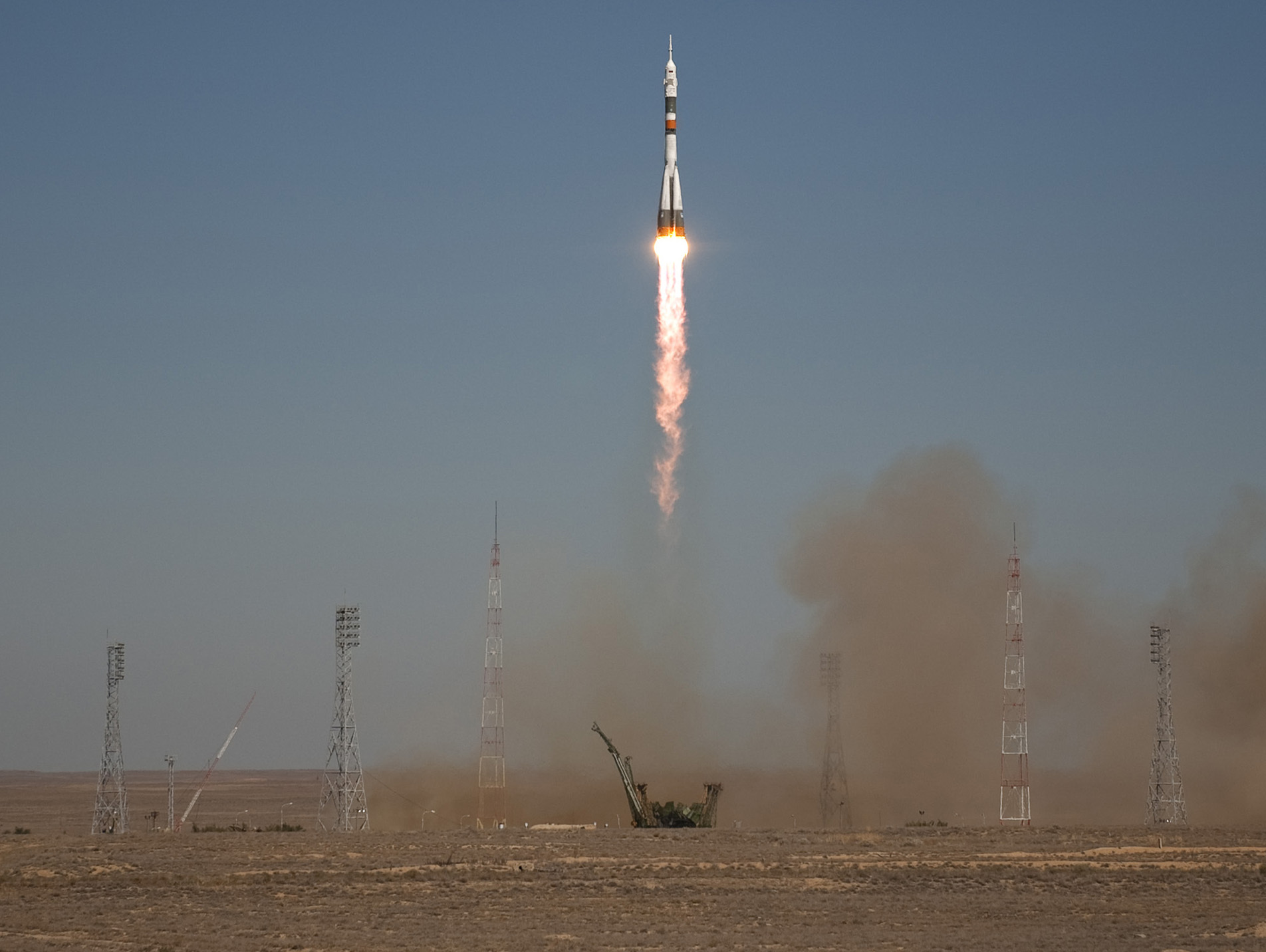
Soyuz TMA-16 launches from Gagarin's Start on 30 September 2009, on its way to the International Space Station.

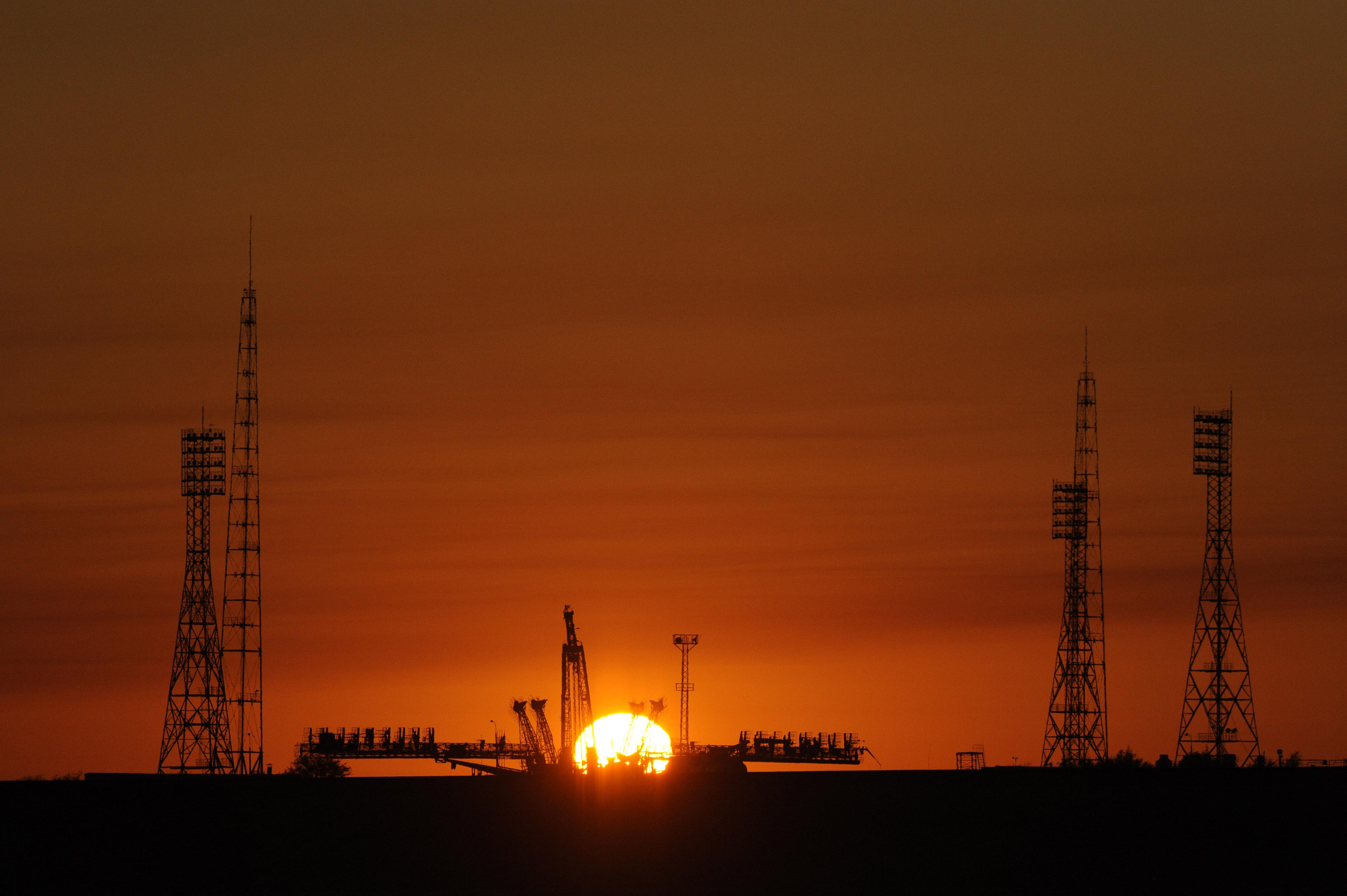
Sunrise at the launch pad prior to the rollout of Soyuz TMA-13, 10 October 2008.

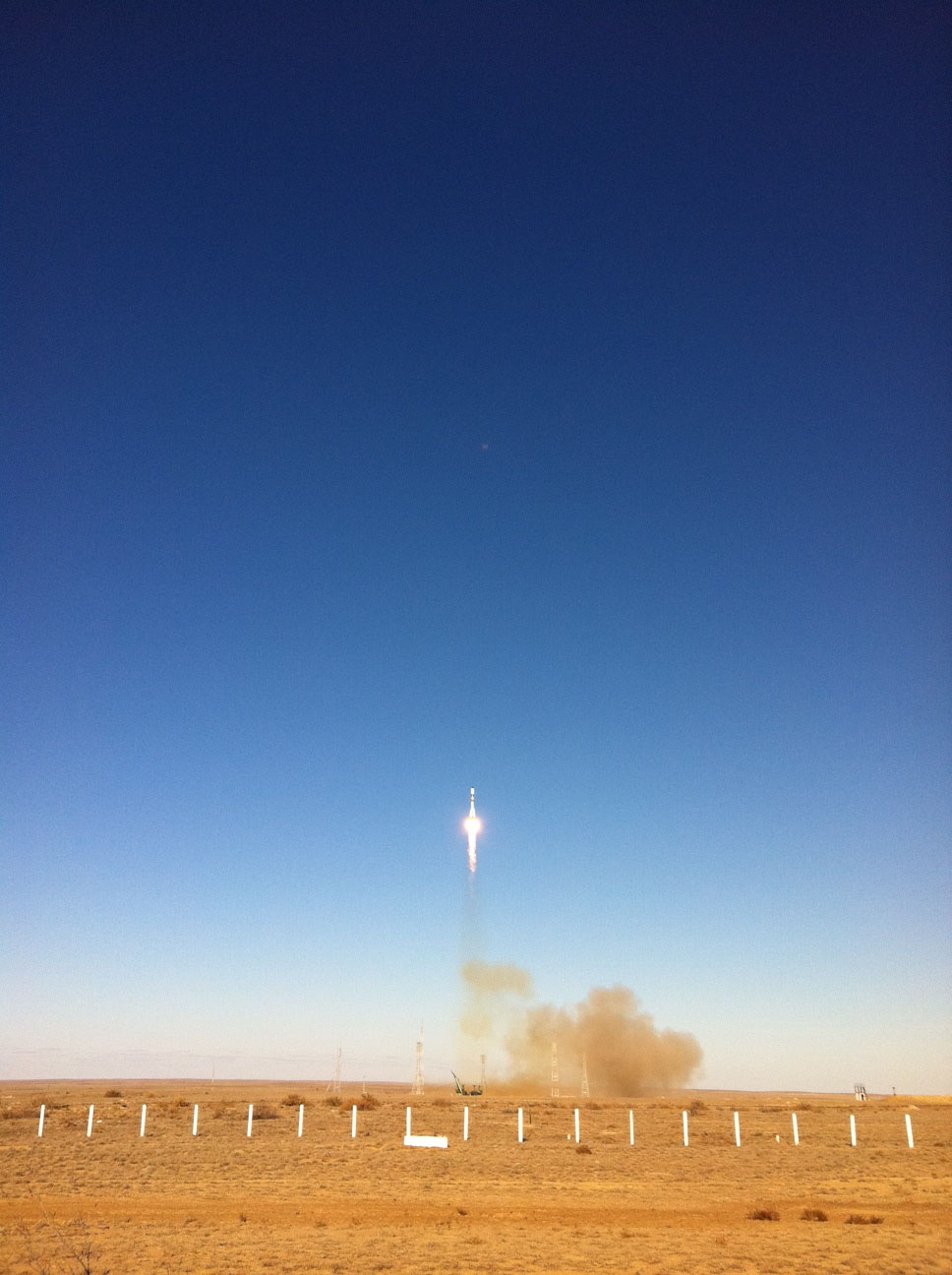
Progress M-13M launches on 30 October 2011.

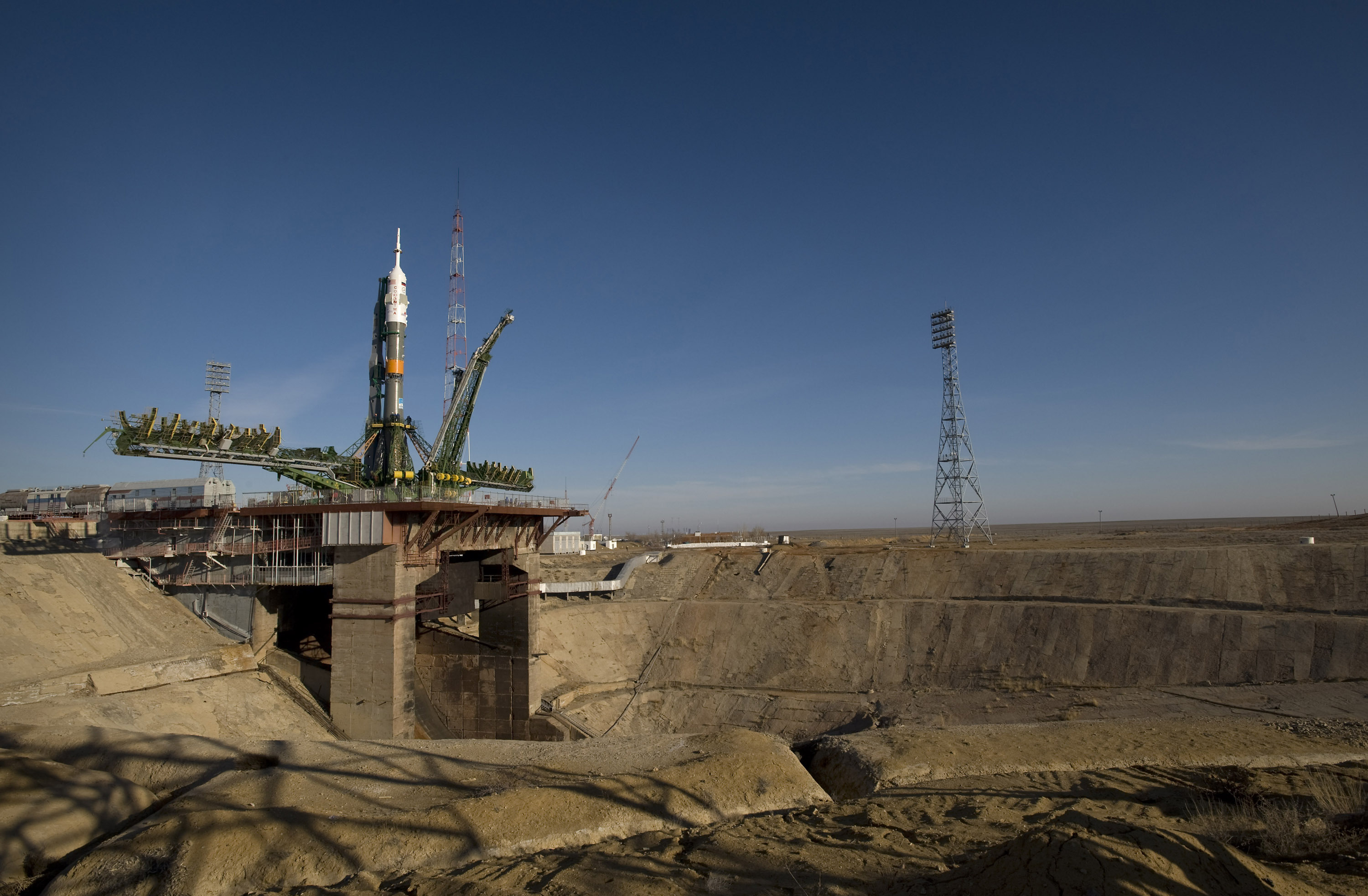
The Flame deflector for Gagarin's Start

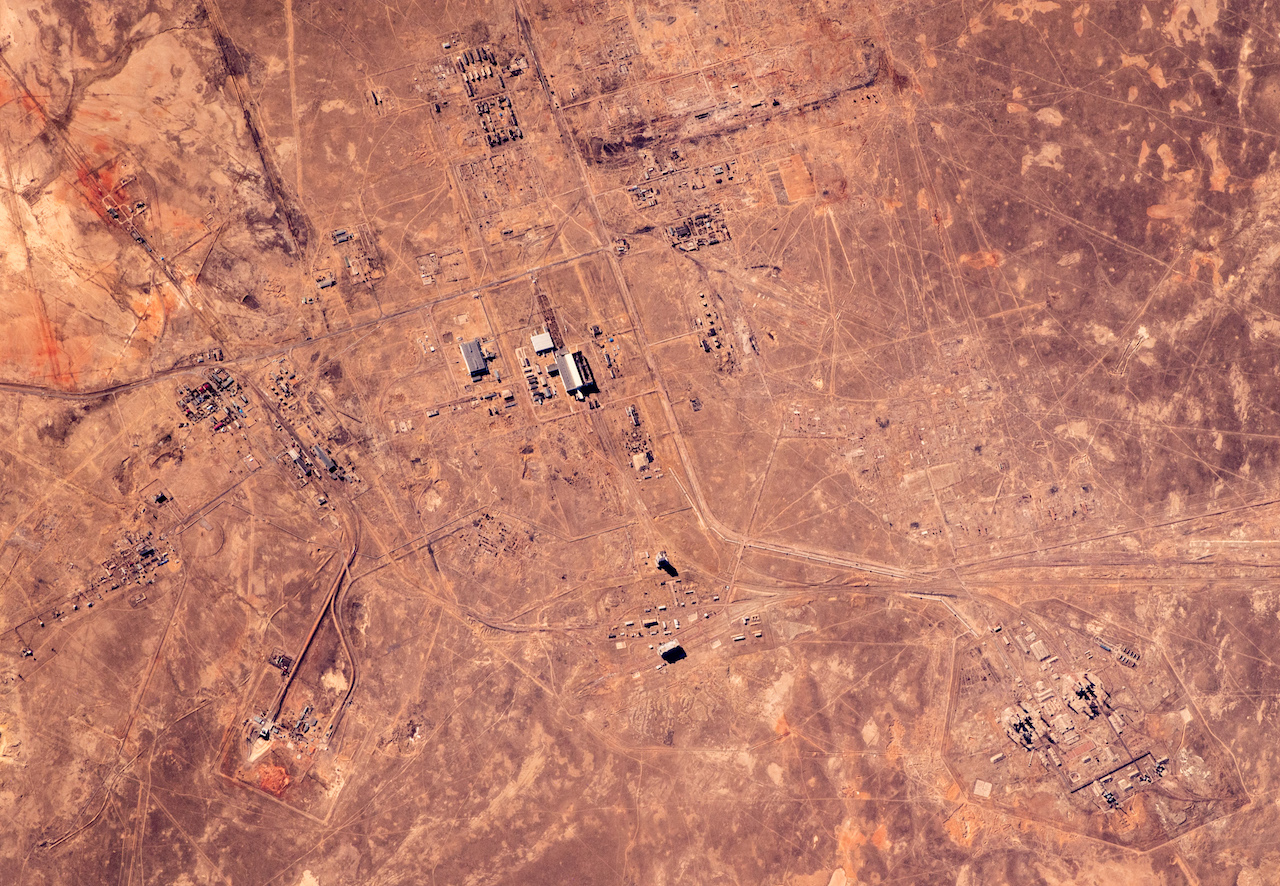
A Soyuz on Gagarin's Start, 2018, satellite photo

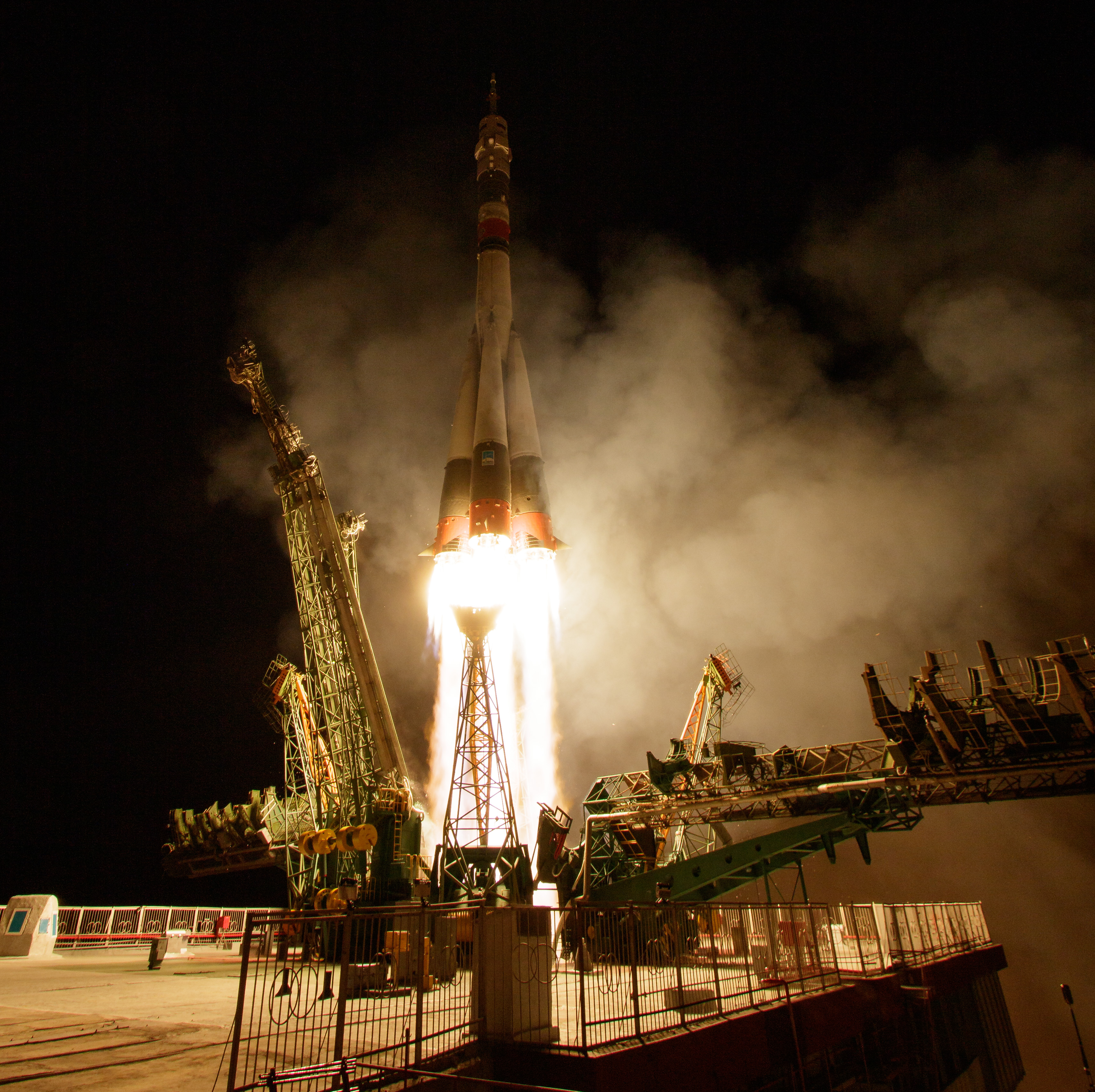
Soyuz MS-15, the final launch from Site 1/5

== See also ==
- Baikonur Cosmodrome Site 31
- Cape Canaveral Launch Complex 14, the equivalent for the United States' first human spaceflights
