= Voskhod (rocket) =

Russian rocket

Voskhod (R-7 11A57)
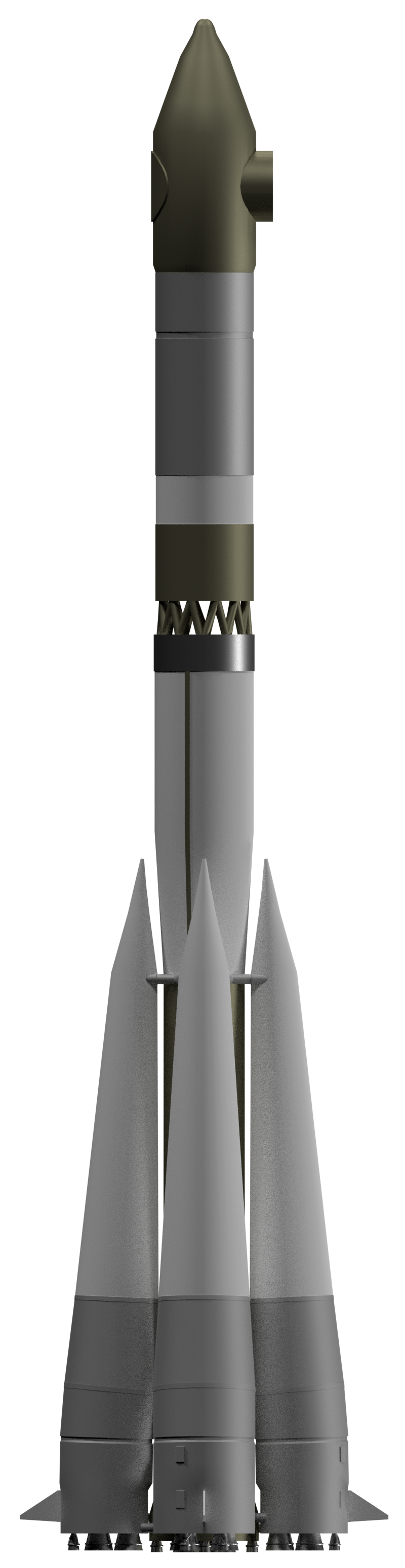
- Voskhod rocket
- Function: Medium-lift launch vehicle
- Manufacturer: OKB-1
- Country of origin: Soviet Union

Size
- Height: 30.84 m (101.2 ft)
- Diameter: 2.99 m (9.8 ft)
- Mass: 298,400 kg (657,900 lb)
- Stages: 3

Capacity

Payload to LEO
- Mass: 5,900 kg (13,000 lb)

Associated rockets
- Family: R-7

Launch history
- Status: Retired
- Launch sites: Baikonur, Sites 1/5 & 31/6; Plesetsk, Site 41/1
- Total launches: 300
- Success(es): 287
- Failure: 13
- First flight: 16 November 1963
- Last flight: 29 June 1976
- Carries passengers or cargo: Voskhod spacecraft Zenit (satellite)

Boosters (First stage) – Block B, V, G & D (Note: This is a transliteration of the second through fifth letters of the Cyrillic alphabet (Б, В, Г, Д). A sense-for-sense translation would correspond to the second through fifth letters of the Latin alphabet, 'Block B, C, D & E'.)
- No. boosters: 4
- Powered by: 1 × RD-107
- Maximum thrust: 995.4 kN (223,800 lb_{f})
- Total thrust: 3,981.6 kN (895,100 lb_{f})
- Specific impulse: 257 s (2.52 km/s)
- Burn time: 119 seconds
- Propellant: LOX / RP-1

Second stage (core) – Block A
- Powered by: 1 × RD-108
- Maximum thrust: 941 kN (212,000 lb_{f})
- Specific impulse: 248 s (2.43 km/s)
- Burn time: 301 seconds
- Propellant: LOX / RP-1

Third stage – Block I (Note: This is a transliteration of the tenth letter of the Cyrillic alphabet (И), which also carries the numerical value 10 in Cyrillic numerals. A sense-for-sense translation would use a Roman numeral, 'Block X'.)
- Powered by: 1 × RD-0107
- Maximum thrust: 294 kN (66,000 lb_{f})
- Specific impulse: 330 s (3.2 km/s)
- Burn time: 240 seconds
- Propellant: LOX / RP-1

Interactive 3D model of the Voskhod rocket

Voskhod (Russian: Восход, lit. 'ascent/dawn', GRAU index: 11A57, Sheldon: A-2, DoD: SL-4) was Soviet medium-lift launch vehicle, a derivative of the R-7, an ICBM. The Voskhod rocket was designed for the human spaceflight programme but later used for launching Zenit reconnaissance satellites. It was essentially an 8K78/8K78M minus the Blok L stage and spec-wise was a halfway between the two boosters, with the former's older, lower-spec engines and the latter's improved Blok I design. Its first flight was on 16 November 1963 when it successfully launched a Zenit satellite from LC-1/5 at Baikonur. Boosters used in the Voskhod program had a man-rated version of the RD-0107 engine; this version was known as the RD-0108.

Starting in 1966, the 11A57 adopted the standardized 11A511 core with the more powerful 8D74M first stage engines, however the Blok I stage continued using the RD-0107 engine rather than the RD-0110. Around 300 were flown from Baikonur and Plesetsk through 1976, almost all of them used to launch Zenit reconnaissance satellites (one exception was the Intercosmos 6 satellite in 1973).

The newer 11A511U core had been introduced in 1973, but the existing stock of 11A57s took another three years to use up.

The rocket had a streak of 86 consecutive successful launches between 11 September 1967 and 9 July 1970.

== See also ==
- Voskhod programme
