= March 18 =

March 18 this year in various calendars
- Wednesday, 18 March 2026
Akan	Fowukuo
Armenian	1 Ahekani 1475
Aztec	Huei Tecuilhuitl 7, 3 Cuāuhtli
Babylonian	28 Shabatu, 2336 SE
Balinese pawukon	Luang, Pepet, Pasah, Jaya, Wage, Tungleh, Buda of Kelawu, Kala, Dangu, Pati
Bengali	4 Chaitro, BS 1432
Chinese	Yin Metal Rabbit・Wall Mansion; Fire Horse Year, Month 1, Day 30 (Jingzhe, 2 days until Chunfen)
Common Era	18 March 2026 CE
Coptic	9 Paremhat, AM 1742
Egyptian	6 Mesori, 2774 NE
Ethiopian	9 Magābit, 2018 Amätä Məhrät
French Republican	Décade III, Octidi de Ventôse de l'Année 234 de la République
Gregorian	18 March, AD 2026
Hebrew	29 Adar, AM 5786
Hindu	Pūrvabhādrapada・Sādhya; Solar: 5 Caitra, 1947 SE; Lunisolar: Caturdaśī, Kṛishna pakṣa of Phālguna, 2082 VE; Rāudra・5126 KY・1,872,652
Icelandic	Miðvikudagur, 25 Góa 2025
Islamic	29 Ramadan, AH 1447 (using tabular method)
ISO week date	2026-W12-3
Japanese	30 Mutsuki, Reiwa 8 (Keichitsu, 2 days until Shunbun)
Julian	5 March, AD 2026 (AM 7534)
Julian day	2461118
Korean	30 Horangidal, 4359 DE
Maya	13.0.13.7.15; 13 Cumku, 3 Men
Roman	ante diem III Nonas Martias, MMDCCLXXIX AUC
Solar Hijri	27 Esfand, SH 1404
Tibetan	30 mchu, me pho rta 2153 or 1772 or 1000

<<	March					>>
Su	Mo	Tu	We	Th	Fr	Sa
1	2	3	4	5	6	7
8	9	10	11	12	13	14
15	16	17	18	19	20	21
22	23	24	25	26	27	28
29	30	31
2026

March 18 in recent years
2026 (Wednesday)
2025 (Tuesday)
2024 (Monday)
2023 (Saturday)
2022 (Friday)
2021 (Thursday)
2020 (Wednesday)
2019 (Monday)
2018 (Sunday)
2017 (Saturday)

March 18 is the 77th day of the year (78th in leap years) in the Gregorian calendar; 288 days remain until the end of the year.

== Events ==
=== Pre-1600 ===
- 37 – Roman Senate annuls Tiberius' will and proclaims Gaius Julius Caesar Augustus Germanicus (aka Caligula = Little Boots) emperor.
- 417 – Pope Zosimus is elected following the death of Pope Innocent I.
- 1068 – An earthquake in the Levant and the Arabian Peninsula leaves up to 20,000 dead.
- 1229 – Frederick II, Holy Roman Emperor, declares himself King of Jerusalem in the Sixth Crusade.
- 1241 – First Mongol invasion of Poland: Mongols overwhelm Polish armies in Kraków in the Battle of Chmielnik and plunder the city.
- 1314 – Jacques de Molay, the 23rd and final Grand Master of the Knights Templar, is burned at the stake.
- 1438 – Albert II of Habsburg becomes King of the Romans.
- 1571 – Valletta is made the capital city of Malta.

=== 1601–1900 ===
- 1608 – Susenyos is formally crowned Emperor of Ethiopia.
- 1644 – The Third Anglo-Powhatan War begins in the Colony of Virginia.
- 1673 – English lord John Berkeley sells his half of New Jersey to the Quakers.
- 1741 – New York governor George Clarke's complex at Fort George is burned in an arson attack, starting the New York Conspiracy of 1741.
- 1766 – American Revolution: The British Parliament repeals the Stamp Act.
- 1793 – The first modern republic in Germany, the Republic of Mainz, is declared by Andreas Joseph Hofmann.
- 1793 – Flanders Campaign of the French Revolution, Battle of Neerwinden.
- 1834 – Six farm labourers from Tolpuddle, Dorset, England are sentenced to be transported to Australia for forming a trade union.
- 1848 – The premiere of William Henry Fry's Leonora in Philadelphia is the first known performance of a grand opera by an American composer.
- 1848 – Revolutions of 1848: A rebellion arises in Milan which in five days of street fighting drove Marshal Radetzky and his Austrian soldiers from the city.
- 1861 – Spain would annex annex the Dominican Republic, which would last for four years.
- 1865 – American Civil War: The Congress of the Confederate States adjourns for the last time.
- 1871 – Declaration of the Paris Commune; President of the French Republic, Adolphe Thiers, orders the evacuation of Paris.
- 1899 – Phoebe, a satellite of Saturn, becomes the first to be discovered with photographs, taken in August 1898, by William Henry Pickering.

=== 1901–present ===
- 1901 – The Kumasi Mutiny of 1901 begins.
- 1902 – Macario Sakay issues Presidential Order No. 1 of his Tagalog Republic.
- 1913 – King George I of Greece is assassinated in the recently liberated city of Thessaloniki.
- 1915 – World War I: During the Battle of Gallipoli, three battleships are sunk during a failed British and French naval attack on the Dardanelles.
- 1921 – The second Peace of Riga is signed between Poland and the Soviet Union.
- 1921 – The Kronstadt rebellion is suppressed by the Red Army.
- 1921 – Mongolian Revolution of 1921: The Mongolian People's Army defeats local Chinese forces at Altanbulag, Selenge (then known as Maimachen). This battle was seen as the birthday of the People's Army and completed the expulsion of Chinese militants in Mongolia.
- 1922 – In India, Mohandas Gandhi is sentenced to six years in prison for civil disobedience, of which he serves only two.
- 1925 – The 1925 Tri-State tornado hits the Midwestern states of Missouri, Illinois, and Indiana, killing 695 people.
- 1937 – The New London School explosion in New London, Texas, kills 300 people, mostly children.
- 1937 – Spanish Civil War: Spanish Republican forces defeat the Italians at the Battle of Guadalajara.
- 1938 – Mexico creates Pemex by expropriating all foreign-owned oil reserves and facilities.
- 1940 – World War II: Adolf Hitler and Benito Mussolini meet at the Brenner Pass in the Alps and agree to form an alliance against France and the United Kingdom.
- 1942 – The War Relocation Authority is established in the United States to take Japanese Americans into custody.
- 1944 – Mount Vesuvius in Italy erupts, killing 26 people, causing thousands to flee their homes, and destroying dozens of Allied bombers.
- 1945 – World War II: 40th Infantry Division, spearheaded by the 185th US Infantry Regiment, lands unopposed in Tigbauan, forcing the Japanese forces to surrender and General Macario Peralta and Gen. Gen. Eichelberger to declare the Liberation of Panay, Romblon and Guimaras.
- 1948 – Soviet consultants leave Yugoslavia in the first sign of the Tito–Stalin split.
- 1953 – An earthquake hits western Turkey, killing at least 1,070 people.
- 1959 – The Hawaii Admission Act is signed into law.
- 1962 – The Évian Accords end the Algerian War of Independence, which had begun in 1954.
- 1965 – Cosmonaut Alexei Leonov, leaving his spacecraft Voskhod 2 for 12 minutes, becomes the first person to walk in space.
- 1966 – United Arab Airlines Flight 749 crashes on approach to Cairo International Airport in Cairo, Egypt, killing 30 people.
- 1967 – The supertanker Torrey Canyon runs aground off the Cornish coast.
- 1968 – Gold standard: The U.S. Congress repeals the requirement for a gold reserve to back US currency.
- 1969 – The United States begins secretly bombing the Sihanouk Trail in Cambodia, used by communist forces to infiltrate South Vietnam.
- 1970 – Lon Nol ousts Prince Norodom Sihanouk of Cambodia.
- 1971 – Peru: A landslide crashes into Yanawayin Lake, killing 200 people at the mining camp of Chungar.
- 1974 – Güzel İstanbul, a nude sculpture by Gürdal Duyar in Istanbul, is torn down in the middle of the night.
- 1980 – A Vostok-2M rocket at Plesetsk Cosmodrome Site 43 explodes during a fueling operation, killing 48 people.
- 1990 – Germans in the German Democratic Republic vote in the first democratic elections in the former communist dictatorship.
- 1990 – In the largest art theft in US history, 12 paintings, collectively worth around $500 million, are stolen from the Isabella Stewart Gardner Museum in Boston.
- 1994 – Bosnia's Bosniaks and Croats sign the Washington Agreement, ending war between the Croatian Republic of Herzeg-Bosnia and the Republic of Bosnia and Herzegovina, and establishing the Federation of Bosnia and Herzegovina.
- 1996 – A nightclub fire in Quezon City, Philippines kills 162 people.
- 1997 – The tail of a Russian Antonov An-24 charter plane breaks off while en route to Turkey, causing the plane to crash and killing all 50 people on board.
- 2014 – The parliaments of Russia and Crimea sign an accession treaty.
- 2015 – The Bardo National Museum in Tunisia is attacked by gunmen. Twenty-four people, almost all tourists, are killed, and at least 50 other people are wounded.
- 2025 – Israel launches widespread aerial bombardments and attacks on the Gaza Strip, killing at least 591 people, including children.

== Births ==
=== Pre-1600 ===
- 1075 – Al-Zamakhshari, Persian scholar and theologian (died 1144)
- 1495 – Mary Tudor, Queen of France (died 1533)
- 1548 – Cornelis Ketel, Dutch painter (died 1616)
- 1552 – Polykarp Leyser the Elder, German theologian (died 1610)
- 1554 – Josias I, Count of Waldeck-Eisenberg, Count of Waldeck-Eisenberg (died 1588)
- 1555 – Francis, Duke of Anjou (died 1584)
- 1578 – Adam Elsheimer, German painter (died 1610)
- 1590 – Manuel de Faria e Sousa, Portuguese historian and poet (died 1649)
- 1597 – Jérôme le Royer de la Dauversière, French religious leader, founded the Société Notre-Dame de Montréal (died 1659)

=== 1601–1900 ===
- 1609 – Frederick III of Denmark (died 1670)
- 1634 – Madame de La Fayette, French author (died 1693)
- 1640 – Philippe de La Hire, French mathematician and astronomer (died 1719)
- 1657 – Giuseppe Ottavio Pitoni, Italian organist and composer (died 1743)
- 1690 – Christian Goldbach, Prussian-German mathematician and academic (died 1764)
- 1701 – Niclas Sahlgren, Swedish businessman and philanthropist, co-founded the Swedish East India Company (died 1776)
- 1733 – Christoph Friedrich Nicolai, German author and bookseller (died 1811)
- 1780 – Miloš Obrenović, Serbian prince (died 1860)
- 1782 – John C. Calhoun, American lawyer and politician, 7th Vice President of the United States (died 1850)
- 1789 – Charlotte Elliott, English poet, hymn writer, editor (died 1871)
- 1798 – Francis Lieber, German-American jurist and philosopher (died 1872)
- 1800 – Harriet Smithson, Irish actress, the first wife and muse of Hector Berlioz (died 1854)
- 1813 – Christian Friedrich Hebbel, German poet and playwright (died 1864)
- 1819 – James McCulloch, Scottish-Australian politician, 5th Premier of Victoria (died 1893)
- 1820 – John Plankinton, American businessman, industrialist, and philanthropist (died 1891)
- 1823 – Antoine Chanzy, French general (died 1883)
- 1828 – Randal Cremer, English activist and politician, Nobel Prize laureate (died 1908)
- 1837 – Grover Cleveland, American lawyer and politician, 22nd and 24th President of the United States (died 1908)
- 1842 – Stéphane Mallarmé, French poet and critic (died 1898)
- 1844 – Nikolai Rimsky-Korsakov, Russian composer and academic (died 1908)
- 1845 – Kicking Bear, Native American tribal leader (died 1904)
- 1857 – Harriet Converse Moody, American businesswoman and arts patron (died 1932)
- 1858 – Rudolf Diesel, German engineer, invented the Diesel engine (died 1913)
- 1862 – Eugène Jansson, Swedish painter (died 1915)
- 1863 – William Sulzer, American lawyer and politician, 39th Governor of New York (died 1941)
- 1865 – Carl Erik Johan Mannerheim, Finnish nobleman and banker (died 1915)
- 1869 – Neville Chamberlain, English businessman and politician, Prime Minister of the United Kingdom (died 1940)
- 1870 – Agnes Sime Baxter, Canadian mathematician (died 1917)
- 1874 – Nikolai Berdyaev, Russian-French philosopher and theologian (died 1948)
- 1877 – Edgar Cayce, American mystic and psychic (died 1945)
- 1877 – Clem Hill, Australian cricketer and engineer (died 1945)
- 1880 – Kalle Hakala, Finnish politician (died 1947)
- 1882 – Gian Francesco Malipiero, Italian composer and educator (died 1973)
- 1884 – Bernard Cronin, English-Australian journalist and author (died 1968)
- 1886 – Edward Everett Horton, American actor, singer, and dancer (died 1970)
- 1890 – Henri Decoin, French director and screenwriter (died 1969)
- 1893 – Costante Girardengo, Italian cyclist (died 1978)
- 1893 – Wilfred Owen, English soldier and poet (died 1918)
- 1899 – Marjorie Abbatt, English toy-maker and businesswoman (died 1991)

=== 1901–present ===
- 1901 – Manly Palmer Hall, Canadian mystic, author and philosopher (died 1990)
- 1903 – Galeazzo Ciano, Italian journalist and politician, Italian Minister of Foreign Affairs (died 1944)
- 1903 – E. O. Plauen, German cartoonist (died 1944)
- 1904 – Srečko Kosovel, Slovenian poet and author (died 1926)
- 1905 – Thomas Townsend Brown, American physicist and engineer (died 1985)
- 1905 – Robert Donat, English actor (died 1958)
- 1907 – John Zachary Young, English zoologist and neurophysiologist (died 1997)
- 1908 – Loulou Gasté, French composer (died 1995)
- 1909 – Ernest Gallo, American businessman, co-founded the E & J Gallo Winery (died 2007)
- 1911 – Smiley Burnette, American singer-songwriter and actor (died 1967)
- 1913 – René Clément, French director and screenwriter (died 1996)
- 1913 – Werner Mölders, German colonel and pilot (died 1941)
- 1915 – Richard Condon, American author and screenwriter (died 1996)
- 1918 – Mitchell WerBell III, American mercenary (died 1983)
- 1922 – Egon Bahr, German journalist and politician, Federal Minister for Special Affairs of Germany (died 2015)
- 1922 – Seymour Martin Lipset, American sociologist and academic (died 2006)
- 1922 – Suzanne Perlman, Hungarian-Dutch visual artist (died 2020)
- 1922 – Fred Shuttlesworth, American activist, co-founded the Southern Christian Leadership Conference (died 2011)
- 1923 – Andy Granatelli, American race car driver and businessman (died 2013)
- 1925 – Alessandro Alessandroni, Italian musician (died 2017)
- 1926 – Peter Graves, American actor and director (died 2010)
- 1927 – John Kander, American pianist and composer
- 1928 – Miguel Poblet, Spanish cyclist (died 2013)
- 1928 – Fidel V. Ramos, Filipino general and politician, 12th President of the Philippines (died 2022)
- 1929 – Samuel Pisar, Polish-American lawyer and author (died 2015)
- 1930 – James J. Andrews, American mathematician and academic (died 1998)
- 1932 – John Updike, American novelist, short story writer, and critic (died 2009)
- 1933 – Unita Blackwell, American civil rights activist and politician (died 2019)
- 1934 – Roy Chapman, English footballer and manager (died 1983)
- 1934 – Charley Pride, American country music singer and musician (died 2020)
- 1935 – Ole Barndorff-Nielsen, Danish mathematician and statistician (died 2022)
- 1935 – Frances Cress Welsing, American psychiatrist and author (died 2016)
- 1936 – F. W. de Klerk, South African lawyer and politician, former State President of South Africa, Nobel Prize laureate (died 2021)
- 1937 – Rudi Altig, German cyclist and sportscaster (died 2016)
- 1937 – Mark Donohue, American race car driver (died 1975)
- 1938 – Carl Gottlieb, American actor and screenwriter
- 1938 – Shashi Kapoor, Indian actor and producer (died 2017)
- 1938 – Timo Mäkinen, Finnish racing driver (died 2017)
- 1938 – Machiko Soga, Japanese actress (died 2006)
- 1939 – Ron Atkinson, English footballer and manager
- 1941 – Wilson Pickett, American singer-songwriter (died 2006)
- 1942 – Kathleen Collins, American filmmaker and playwright (died 1988)
- 1942 – Jeff Mullins, American basketball player and coach
- 1944 – Amnon Lipkin-Shahak, Israeli general and politician, 22nd Transportation Minister of Israel (died 2012)
- 1945 – Hiroh Kikai, Japanese photographer (died 2020)
- 1945 – Susan Tyrrell, American actress (died 2012)
- 1946 – Michel Leclère, French racing driver
- 1947 – Patrick Chesnais, French actor, director, and screenwriter
- 1947 – David Lloyd, English cricketer, journalist, and sportscaster
- 1947 – Drew Struzan, American artist, illustrator and poster/cover designer (died 2025)
- 1948 – Guy Lapointe, Canadian ice hockey player and coach
- 1948 – Brian Lloyd, Welsh footballer
- 1948 – Eknath Solkar, Indian cricketer (died 2005)
- 1949 – Åse Kleveland, Norwegian singer and politician, Norwegian Minister of Culture
- 1950 – Brad Dourif, American actor
- 1950 – Linda Partridge, English geneticist and academic
- 1950 – Larry Perkins, Australian race car driver
- 1951 – Ben Cohen, American businessman and philanthropist, co-founded Ben and Jerry's
- 1951 – Bill Frisell, American guitarist and composer
- 1952 – Pat Eddery, Irish jockey and trainer (died 2015)
- 1953 – Franz Wright, Austrian-American poet and translator (died 2015)
- 1953 – Takashi Yoshimatsu, Japanese composer
- 1956 – Rick Martel, Canadian wrestler
- 1956 – Deborah Jeane Palfrey, American madam (died 2008)
- 1956 – Ingemar Stenmark, Swedish skier
- 1957 – Christer Fuglesang, Swedish physicist and astronaut
- 1958 – Richard de Zoysa, Sri Lankan journalist and author (died 1990)
- 1959 – Luc Besson, French director, producer, and screenwriter, founded EuropaCorp
- 1959 – Irene Cara, American singer-songwriter and actress (died 2022)
- 1960 – Richard Biggs, American actor (died 2004)
- 1960 – Guy Carbonneau, Canadian ice hockey player and coach
- 1960 – James Plaskett, Cypriot-English chess player
- 1961 – Grant Hart, American singer-songwriter and guitarist (died 2017)
- 1961 – Geoffrey Owens, American actor
- 1962 – Thomas Ian Griffith, American actor, producer, screenwriter, musician and martial artist
- 1962 – James McMurtry, American singer-songwriter, guitarist, and actor
- 1962 – Mike Rowe, American television personality
- 1962 – Etsushi Toyokawa, Japanese actor and director
- 1962 – Volker Weidler, German race car driver and engineer
- 1963 – Jeff LaBar, American guitarist (died 2021)
- 1963 – Vanessa L. Williams, American model, actress, and singer
- 1964 – Bonnie Blair, American speed skater
- 1964 – Alex Caffi, Italian race car driver
- 1964 – Jo Churchill, British politician
- 1964 – Isabel Noronha, Mozambican film director
- 1964 – Courtney Pine, English saxophonist and clarinet player
- 1965 – David Cubitt, English-Canadian actor
- 1966 – Jerry Cantrell, American singer-songwriter and guitarist
- 1966 – Peter Jones, English businessman
- 1966 – Brian Watts, Canadian golfer
- 1967 – Miki Berenyi, English singer-songwriter and guitarist
- 1968 – Miguel Herrera, Mexican footballer and manager
- 1968 – Temur Ketsbaia, Georgian footballer and manager
- 1968 – Paul Marsden, English businessman and politician
- 1969 – Michael Bergin, American actor
- 1969 – Andy Cutting, English accordion player and composer
- 1969 – Vasyl Ivanchuk, Ukrainian chess player
- 1969 – Shaun Udal, English cricketer
- 1970 – Katy Gallagher, Australian politician
- 1970 – Queen Latifah, American rapper, producer, and actress
- 1971 – Wayne Arthurs, Australian tennis player
- 1971 – Mike Bell, American wrestler (died 2008)
- 1971 – Mariaan de Swardt, South African-American tennis player, coach, and sportscaster
- 1971 – Kitty Ussher, English economist and politician
- 1972 – Dane Cook, American comedian, actor, director, and producer
- 1972 – Reince Priebus, American lawyer and politician
- 1973 – Luci Christian, American voice actress and screenwriter
- 1974 – Laure Savasta, French basketball player, coach, and sportscaster
- 1974 – Stuart Zender, English bass player, songwriter, and producer
- 1975 – Sutton Foster, American actress, singer, and dancer
- 1975 – Brian Griese, American football player and sportscaster
- 1975 – Kimmo Timonen, Finnish ice hockey player
- 1975 – Tomas Žvirgždauskas, Lithuanian footballer
- 1976 – Giovanna Antonelli, Brazilian actress and producer
- 1976 – Tomo Ohka, Japanese baseball player
- 1976 – Scott Podsednik, American baseball player
- 1976 – Mike Quackenbush, American wrestler, trainer, and author, founded Chikara wrestling promotion
- 1977 – Zdeno Chára, Slovak ice hockey player
- 1977 – Danny Murphy, English footballer and sportscaster
- 1977 – Fernando Rodney, Dominican-American baseball player
- 1977 – Willy Sagnol, French footballer and manager
- 1977 – Terrmel Sledge, American baseball player and coach
- 1978 – Jan Bulis, Czech ice hockey player
- 1978 – Fernandão, Brazilian footballer and manager (died 2014)
- 1978 – Brooke Hanson, Australian swimmer
- 1978 – Hu Jun, Chinese actor
- 1978 – Brian Scalabrine, American basketball player, coach, and sportscaster
- 1978 – Jonas Wallerstedt, Swedish footballer, coach, and manager
- 1979 – Adam Levine, American singer-songwriter, guitarist, and television personality
- 1980 – Sébastien Frey, French footballer
- 1980 – Sophia Myles, English actress
- 1980 – Vitaly Vishnevskiy, Russian ice hockey player
- 1980 – Alexei Yagudin, Russian figure skater
- 1981 – Tora Berger, Norwegian biathlete
- 1981 – Fabian Cancellara, Swiss cyclist
- 1981 – Leslie Djhone, French sprinter
- 1981 – Jang Na-ra, South Korean singer and actress
- 1981 – Kasib Powell, American basketball player
- 1981 – Tom Starke, German footballer
- 1981 – Doug Warren, American soccer player
- 1981 – Lovro Zovko, Croatian tennis player
- 1982 – Chad Cordero, American baseball player
- 1982 – Timo Glock, German race car driver
- 1982 – Matthew Lombardi, Canadian ice hockey player
- 1982 – Mantorras, Angolan footballer
- 1982 – Adam Pally, American actor, director, producer, and screenwriter
- 1983 – Ethan Carter III, American wrestler
- 1983 – Stéphanie Cohen-Aloro, French tennis player
- 1983 – Andy Sonnanstine, American baseball player
- 1983 – Tomasz Stolpa, Polish footballer
- 1984 – Simone Padoin, Italian footballer
- 1984 – Rajeev Ram, American tennis player
- 1984 – Vonzell Solomon, American singer and actress
- 1985 – Ana Beatriz, Brazilian race car driver
- 1985 – Duane Henry, English actor
- 1985 – Marvin Humes, English singer
- 1985 – Vince Lia, Australian footballer
- 1986 – Abdennour Chérif El-Ouazzani, Algerian footballer
- 1986 – Lykke Li, Swedish singer-songwriter
- 1986 – Cory Schneider, American ice hockey player
- 1986 – Eric Wood, American football player and sportscaster
- 1987 – C. J. Miles, American basketball player
- 1987 – Rebecca Soni, American swimmer
- 1989 – Robert Bortuzzo, Canadian ice hockey player
- 1989 – Francesco Checcucci, Italian footballer
- 1989 – Lily Collins, English-American actress
- 1989 – Shreevats Goswami, Indian cricketer
- 1989 – Kana Nishino, Japanese singer-songwriter
- 1989 – Paul Marc Rousseau, Canadian guitarist and producer
- 1989 – Ming Xi, Chinese model
- 1991 – Travis Frederick, American football player
- 1991 – Leury García, Dominican baseball player
- 1991 – Solomon Hill, American basketball player
- 1991 – Dylan Mattingly, American singer-songwriter and guitarist
- 1991 – J. T. Realmuto, American baseball player
- 1992 – Anthony Barr, American football player
- 1992 – Trey Mancini, American baseball player
- 1992 – Ryan Truex, American race car driver
- 1992 – Takuya Terada, Japanese singer, actor, and model
- 1993 – Solo Sikoa, American wrestler
- 1994 – Kris Dunn, American basketball player
- 1994 – Ronnie Stanley, American football player
- 1995 – Irina Bara, Romanian tennis player
- 1995 – Julia Goldani Telles, American actress and dancer
- 1996 – Skal Labissière, Haitian basketball player
- 1997 – Ciara Bravo, American actress
- 1997 – Rieko Ioane, New Zealand rugby union player
- 1997 – Jordan Whitehead, American football player
- 1997 – Ivica Zubac, Croatian basketball player
- 1997 – Cary and Michael Huang, the twins who founded BFDI
- 1998 – Emmanuel Clase, Dominican baseball player
- 1999 – Diogo Dalot, Portuguese footballer
- 2002 – Brenden Rice, American football player

== Deaths ==
=== Pre-1600 ===
- 978 – Edward the Martyr, English king (born 962)
- 1076 – Ermengarde of Anjou, Duchess of Burgundy (born 1018)
- 1086 – Anselm of Lucca, Italian bishop (born 1036)
- 1227 – Pope Honorius III (born 1148)
- 1308 – Yuri I of Galicia
- 1314 – Jacques de Molay, Frankish knight (born 1244)
- 1314 – Geoffroy de Charney, Preceptor of Normandy for the Knights Templar
- 1321 – Matthew III Csák, Hungarian oligarch (born c. 1260/5)
- 1582 – Juan Jauregui, attempted assassin of William I of Orange (born 1562)

=== 1601–1900 ===
- 1675 – Arthur Chichester, 1st Earl of Donegall, Irish soldier (born 1606)
- 1689 – John Dixwell, English soldier and politician (born 1607)
- 1703 – Maria de Dominici, Maltese sculptor and painter (born 1645)
- 1745 – Robert Walpole, English politician, Prime Minister of the United Kingdom (born 1676)
- 1768 – Laurence Sterne, Irish novelist and clergyman (born 1713)
- 1781 – Anne Robert Jacques Turgot, French economist and politician, Controller-General of Finances (born 1727)
- 1793 – Karl Abraham Zedlitz, Prussian minister of education (born 1731)
- 1823 – Jean-Baptiste Bréval, French cellist and composer (born 1753)
- 1835 – Christian Günther von Bernstorff, Danish-Prussian politician and diplomat (born 1769)
- 1845 – Johnny Appleseed, American gardener and missionary (born 1774)
- 1871 – Augustus De Morgan, Indian-English mathematician and academic (born 1806)
- 1898 – Matilda Joslyn Gage, American author and activist (born 1826)
- 1900 – Hjalmar Kiærskou, Danish botanist (born 1835)

=== 1901–present ===
- 1907 – Marcellin Berthelot, French chemist and politician, French Minister of Foreign Affairs (born 1827)
- 1913 – George I of Greece (born 1845)
- 1918 – Henry Janeway Hardenbergh, American architect, designed the Plaza Hotel (born 1847)
- 1930 – Jean Leon Gerome Ferris, American painter (born 1863)
- 1936 – Eleftherios Venizelos, Greek journalist, lawyer, and politician, 93rd Prime Minister of Greece (born 1864)
- 1939 – Henry Simpson Lunn, English businessman, founded Lunn Poly (born 1859)
- 1941 – Henri Cornet, French cyclist (born 1884)
- 1947 – William C. Durant, American businessman, co-founded General Motors and Chevrolet (born 1861)
- 1954 – Walter Mead, English cricketer (born 1868)
- 1956 – Louis Bromfield, American environmentalist and author (born 1896)
- 1962 – Walter W. Bacon, American accountant and politician, 60th Governor of Delaware (born 1880)
- 1963 – C. C. Martindale, English Jesuit priest (born 1879)
- 1964 – Sigfrid Edström, Swedish businessman, 4th President of the International Olympic Committee (born 1870)
- 1965 – Farouk of Egypt (born 1920)
- 1973 – Johannes Aavik, Estonian philologist and poet (born 1880)
- 1977 – Marien Ngouabi, Congolese politician, President of the Republic of the Congo (born 1938)
- 1977 – Carlos Pace, Brazilian race car driver (born 1944)
- 1978 – Leigh Brackett, American author and screenwriter (born 1915)
- 1978 – Peggy Wood, American actress (born 1892)
- 1980 – Erich Fromm, German psychologist and philosopher (born 1900)
- 1980 – Tamara de Lempicka, Polish-American painter (born 1898)
- 1982 – Patrick Smith, Irish farmer and politician, Minister for Agriculture, Food and the Marine (born 1901)
- 1983 – Umberto II of Italy (born 1904)
- 1984 – Charley Lau, American baseball player and coach (born 1933)
- 1986 – Bernard Malamud, American novelist and short story writer (born 1914)
- 1987 – Kari Diesen, Norwegian singer and revue actress (born 1914)
- 1988 – Billy Butterfield, American trumpet player and cornet player (born 1917)
- 1990 – Robin Harris, American comedian (born 1953)
- 1993 – Kenneth E. Boulding, English-American economist and activist (born 1910)
- 1996 – Odysseas Elytis, Greek poet and critic, Nobel Prize laureate (born 1911)
- 2000 – Eberhard Bethge, German theologian and academic (born 1909)
- 2001 – John Phillips, American singer-songwriter and guitarist (born 1935)
- 2002 – R. A. Lafferty, American soldier and author (born 1914)
- 2003 – Karl Kling, German race car driver (born 1910)
- 2003 – Adam Osborne, Thai-English engineer and businessman, founded the Osborne Computer Corporation (born 1939)
- 2004 – Harrison McCain, Canadian businessman, co-founded McCain Foods (born 1927)
- 2006 – Dan Gibson, Canadian photographer and cinematographer (born 1922)
- 2007 – Bob Woolmer, Indian-English cricketer, coach, and sportscaster (born 1948)
- 2008 – Anthony Minghella, English director and screenwriter (born 1954)
- 2009 – Omid Reza Mir Sayafi, Iranian journalist and blogger (born 1980)
- 2009 – Natasha Richardson, English-American actress (born 1963)
- 2010 – Fess Parker, American actor and businessman (born 1924)
- 2011 – Warren Christopher, American lawyer and politician, 63rd United States Secretary of State (born 1925)
- 2012 – Furman Bisher, American journalist and author (born 1918)
- 2012 – William R. Charette, American soldier, Medal of Honor recipient (born 1932)
- 2012 – William G. Moore Jr., American general (born 1920)
- 2012 – George Tupou V of Tonga (born 1948)
- 2013 – Muhammad Mahmood Alam, Pakistani general and pilot (born 1935)
- 2013 – Henry Bromell, American novelist, screenwriter, and director (born 1947)
- 2013 – Clay Ford, American lawyer and politician (born 1938)
- 2014 – Catherine Obianuju Acholonu, Nigerian author, playwright, and academic (born 1951)
- 2014 – Kaiser Kalambo, Zambian footballer, coach, and manager (born 1953)
- 2014 – Lucius Shepard, American author and critic (born 1943)
- 2015 – Zhao Dayu, Chinese footballer and manager (born 1961)
- 2015 – Thomas Hopko, American priest and theologian (born 1939)
- 2015 – Grace Ogot, Kenyan nurse, journalist, and politician (born 1930)
- 2016 – Barry Hines, English author and screenwriter (born 1939)
- 2016 – Jan Němec, Czech director and screenwriter (born 1936)
- 2016 – Tray Walker, American football player (born 1992)
- 2016 – Guido Westerwelle, German lawyer and politician, 15th Vice-Chancellor of Germany (born 1961)
- 2017 – Chuck Berry, American guitarist, singer and songwriter (born 1926)
- 2020 – Alfred Worden, American test pilot, engineer and astronaut (born 1932)
- 2024 – Thomas P. Stafford, American Air Force officer, test pilot, and NASA astronaut (born 1930)
- 2025 – Kanzi, Bonobo research subject (born 1980)
- 2025 – Jessie Hoffman Jr., American convicted murderer (born 1978)

== Holidays and observances ==
- Anniversary of the Oil Expropriation (Mexico)
- Christian feast day:
  - Blessed Aimée-Adèle Le Bouteiller
  - Alexander of Jerusalem
  - Anselm of Lucca
  - Cyril of Jerusalem
  - Edward the Martyr
  - Fridianus
  - Salvator
  - March 18 (Eastern Orthodox liturgics)
- Flag Day (Aruba)
- Gallipoli Memorial Day (Turkey)
- Men's and Soldiers' Day (Mongolia)
- Ordnance Factories' Day (India)
- Sheelah's Day (Ireland, Canada, Australia)
- Teacher's Day (Syria)
