= Balthasar Gérard =

Murderer of Dutch independence leader William the Silent in 1584

Balthazar Gérard
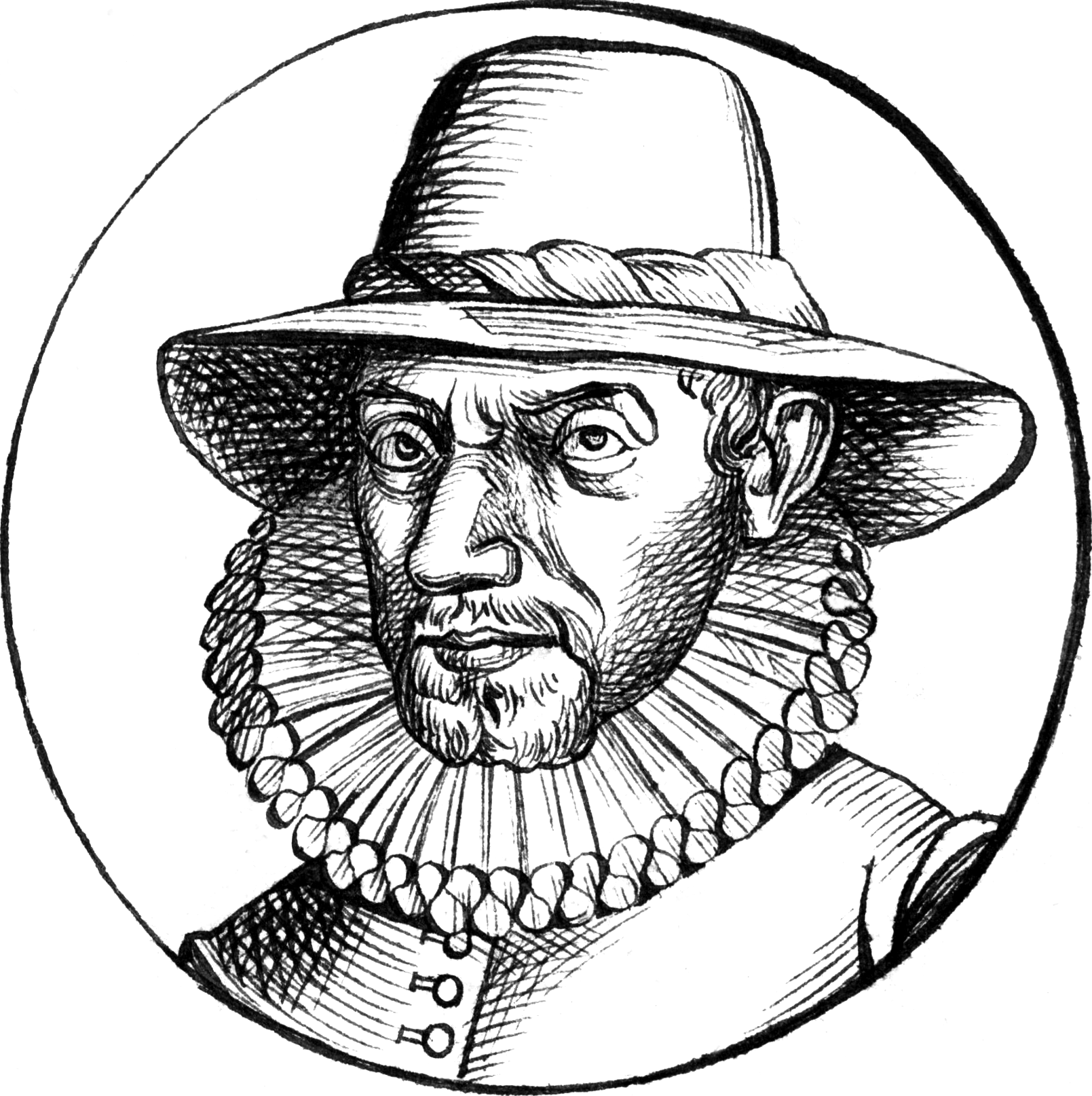
- Portrait of Gérard, c. 16th century. Author unknown. Stedelijk Museum het Prinsenhof, Delft
- Born: c. 1557; Vuillafans, County of Burgundy, Holy Roman Empire
- Died: 14 July 1584 (aged 26–27); Delft, Holland
- Known for: Assassination of William the Silent

Balthazar Gérard (Note: Known in Dutch as Balthasar Gerards or Gerardt.) (c. 1557 – 14 July 1584) was the assassin of the Dutch revolt's leader, William the Silent of the House of Orange.

He was the second recorded person to assassinate a head of state with a firearm.

Gérard was tortured and then executed for the assassination, in a manner considered brutal even by the standards of the 16th century.

== Early life ==
Gérard was born in Vuillafans in the County of Burgundy, shortly after Philip II of Spain's accession, just in time for him to be his subject by birth. His father, Jean Gérard, was somewhat prominent in his community as a landowner and jurist, while his mother, Barbe d'Emskerque (who likely had family roots in the Dutch village of Heemskerk), had 1 sister and 5 brothers, 2 of which went on to become priests, while the other 3 became embroiled in legal battles due to supposed Lutheran sympathies. This family background likely contributed to Balthazar's devout Roman Catholic faith, as well as his decision to study law at the University of Dole.

On 15 March 1580, King Philip had offered a reward of 25,000 crowns, peerage and an inheritable estate to anyone who killed or captured William the Silent, the leader of the Dutch Revolt, to whom he referred in his decree as a "pest on the whole of Christianity and the enemy of the human race". Gérard, who was already a great admirer of King Philip, was thus incited to action.

== Assassination of William the Silent ==
=== Preparations ===
After the reward offered by Philip was published, Gérard left for Luxembourg, where he learned that Juan de Jáuregui had already been preparing to attempt the assassination, but this attempt did not succeed. In March 1584 he went to Trier, where he put his plan before the regent of the Jesuits, but another Jesuit convinced him to change his original scheme and go to the prince of Parma. In Tournai, after holding counsel with a Franciscan, Father Gery, Gérard wrote a letter, a copy of which was deposited with the guardian of the convent, and the original presented personally to the Prince of Parma. In the letter Gérard wrote, in part, "The vassal ought always to prefer justice and the will of the king to his own life."

At first the prince thought him unfit but after consulting Haultepenne and others with the letter he was assigned to Christoffel d'Assonleville, who spoke with Gérard, and asked him to put this in writing, which he did on 11 April 1584. He requested absolution from the prince of Parma "as he was about to keep company for some time with heretics and atheists, and in some sort to conform himself to their customs".

For his first expenses he begged for 50 crowns, which were refused. "I will provide myself out of my own purse", Gérard told Assonleville, "and within six weeks you will hear of me." Assonleville responded: "Go forth, my son ... and if you succeed in your enterprise, the King will fulfill all his promises, and you will gain an immortal name besides." On Sunday, 8 July 1584, Gérard loitered in the courtyard of the Prinsenhof examining the premises. A halberdier asked him why he was waiting there. He excused himself by saying that in his present shabby clothing and without new shoes he was unfit to join the congregation in the church opposite. The halberdier unsuspectingly but generously arranged from the Prince of Orange himself a gift of 50 crowns for Gérard, who the following morning purchased a pair of pistols from a soldier, haggling the price for a long time because the soldier could not supply the particular chopped bullets or slugs he wanted.

=== The shooting ===
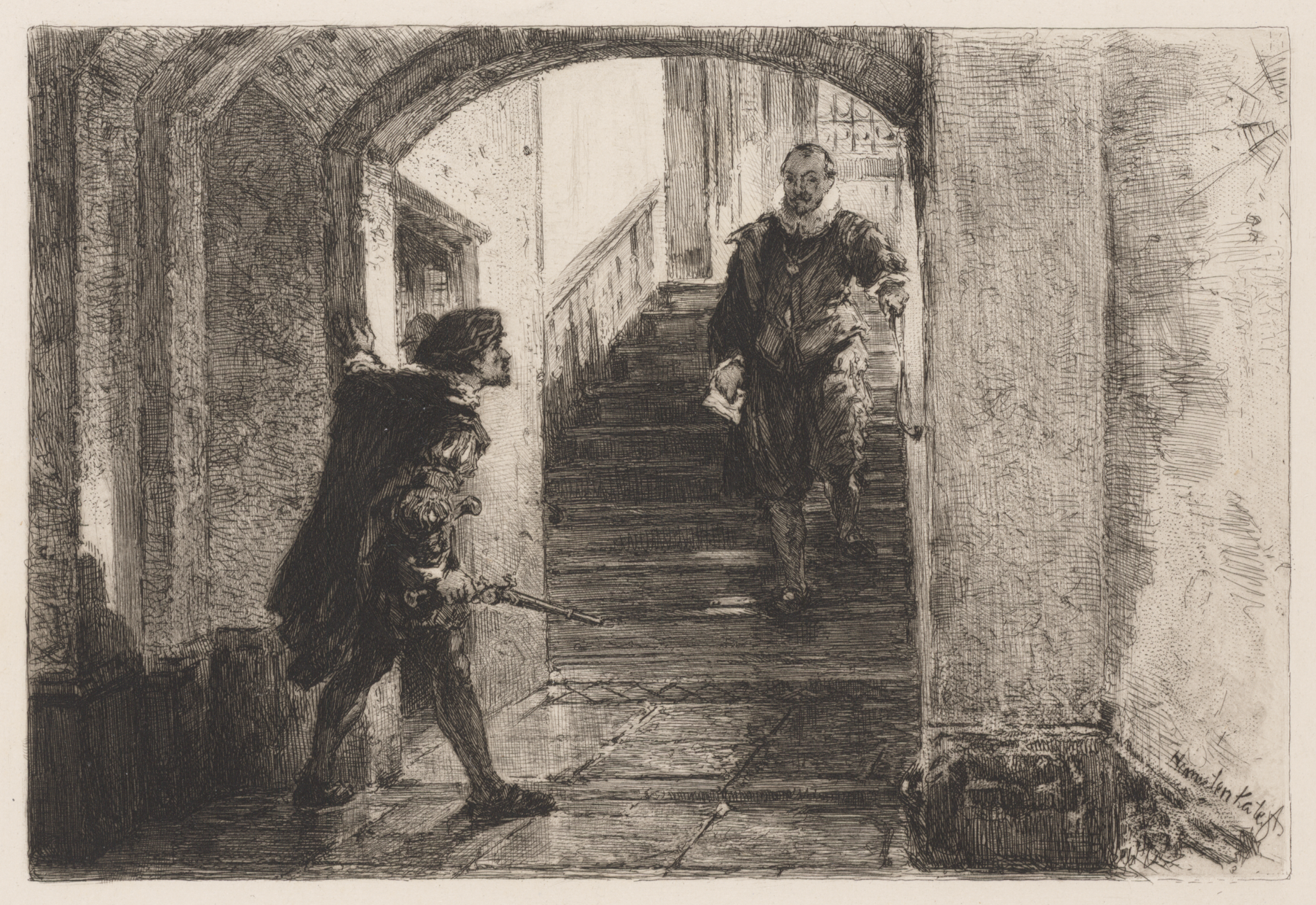
Gérard shooting William the Silent

On 10 July 1584, as William the Silent climbed the stairs to the second floor, he was spoken to by the Welsh captain Roger Williams, who knelt before him. William put his hand on the bowed head of the old captain, at which moment Gérard jumped out of a dark corner. He drew his weapons and fired two shots at the stadtholder. William the Silent collapsed. His sister knelt beside him, but it was too late. The exact story surrounding the last moments before his death are lost to history, but according to legend he was asked whether he commended his soul to Christ, he answered in the affirmative. His last words were, Mon Dieu, ayez pitié de moi et de mon pauvre peuple ("My God, have mercy on me and on my poor people"). The contemporary consensus among Dutch historians is that William the Silent could not have said this, as he was most likely dead at the instant he was shot. However, his legendary final words remain a part of the Dutch historical canon.

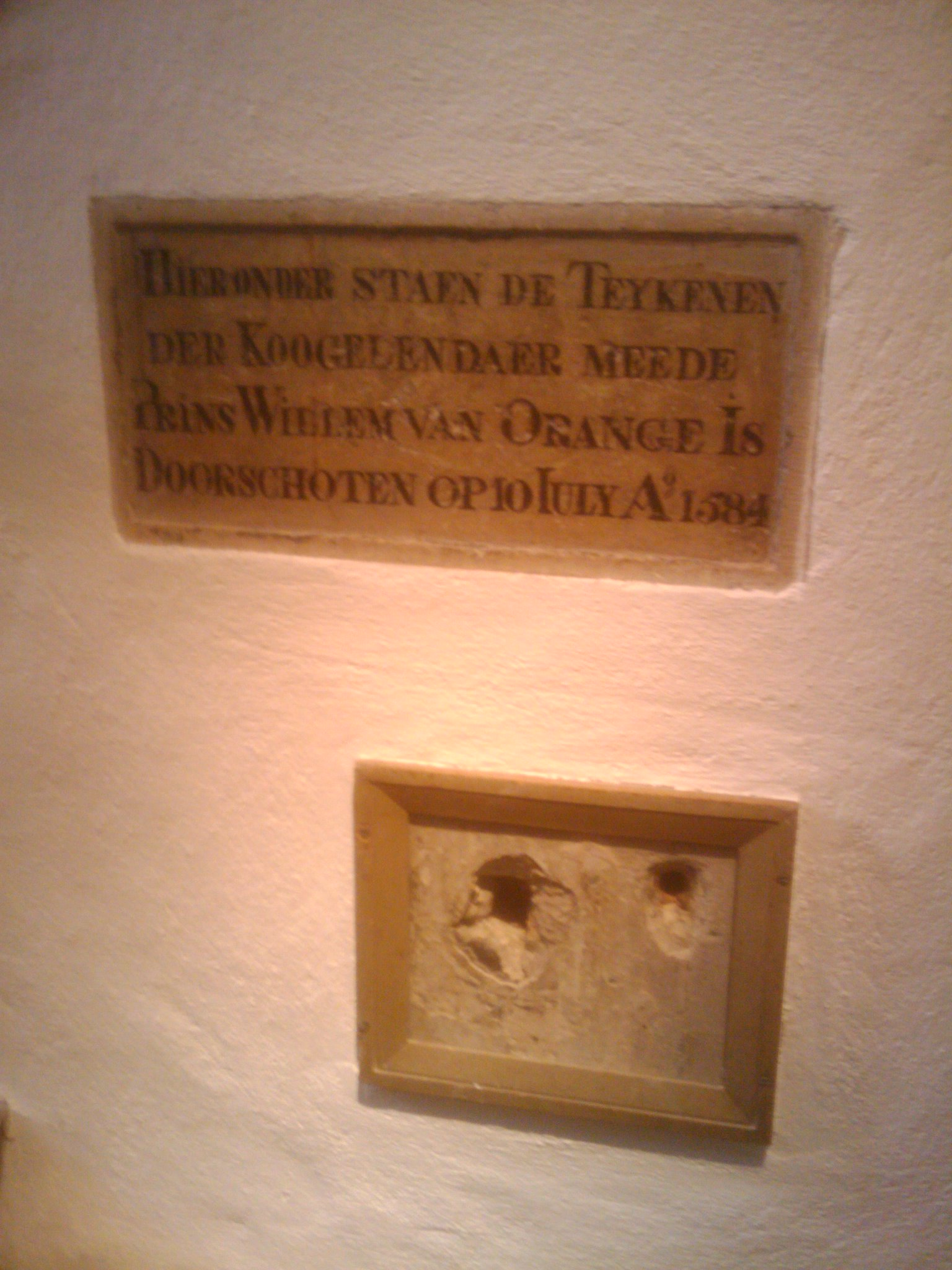
The bullet holes are still visible at the Museum Het Prinsenhof in Delft

Gérard fled through a side door and ran across a narrow lane, pursued by Roger Williams. Gérard had almost reached the ramparts, from which he intended to jump into the moat. On the other side a saddled horse stood ready. A pig's bladder around his waist was intended to help keep him afloat. However, he stumbled over a heap of rubbish. A servant and a halberdier of the prince who had raced after him caught him. When called a traitor by his captors, he is said to have replied, "I am no traitor; I am a loyal servant of my lord." "Which lord?", they asked. "Of my lord and master, the king of Spain". At the same time more pages and halberdiers of the prince appeared and dragged him back to the house under a rain of fists and beatings with the butt of a sword. Hearing his assailants chatter and convinced he heard the prince was still alive, he cried "Cursed be the hand that missed!"

The shooting is notable for being the first recorded political assassination of a head of state with a handheld firearm. After William the Silent's murder, more than 200 years would pass until another head of state was killed by a firearm, when Gustav III, King of Sweden, was fatally wounded at a midnight masquerade in 1792.

== Trial, torture, and execution ==
At the house he immediately underwent a preliminary examination before the city magistrates. Upon being interrogated by the magistrates, he reportedly showed neither despair nor contrition, but rather a quiet exultation, stating: "Like David, he had slain Goliath of Gath."

At his trial, Gérard was sentenced to be tortured and then executed, in a manner considered brutal even by the standards at the time. The magistrates decreed that firstly the right hand of Gérard should be burned off with a red-hot iron, that his flesh should be torn from his bones with pincers in six different places, that he furthermore should be quartered and disemboweled alive, his heart torn from his bosom and flung in his face, and that, finally, his head should be taken off.

Gérard's torture was wrathful and brutal. On the first night of his imprisonment, Gérard was hung on a pole and lashed with a whip. Afterwards, his wounds were smeared with honey, and a goat was brought to lick the honey off the skin with its rough tongue, causing him to be flayed. The goat, however, refused to touch his body but the honey remained on his body for the night. After several other forms of torture, he was left to pass the night with his hands and feet bound together, like a ball, so sleep would be difficult. During the following three days, he was repeatedly mocked and hung on a pole with his hands tied behind his back. Then, a weight of 300 metric pounds (150 kg) was attached to each of his big toes for half an hour. It did not bring about a testimony as to the identity of his accomplices.

Subsequently, Gérard was fitted with shoes made of well-oiled, uncured dog skin; the shoes were two fingers shorter than his feet. In this state, he was put before a fire. When the shoes warmed up, they contracted, crushing the feet inside them to stumps. When the shoes were removed, his half-broiled skin was torn off. After his feet were damaged, his armpits were branded. He was then dressed in a shirt soaked in alcohol. Lastly, burning bacon fat was poured over him and sharp nails were stuck between the flesh and the nails of his hands and feet. Despite the pressure of the investigation, Gérard remained silent, except, allegedly, for the name of Parma, the duchy of the former stewards Alexander Farnese and Margaret of Parma, both enemies of the Protestant Dutch. On 14 July, four days after the assassination, the sentence declared at the trial was carried out and Gérard was executed in the market square of Delft. His severed head was then displayed on a pike behind the Prinsenhof, and his arms and legs displayed on four gates of the city.

== Aftermath ==
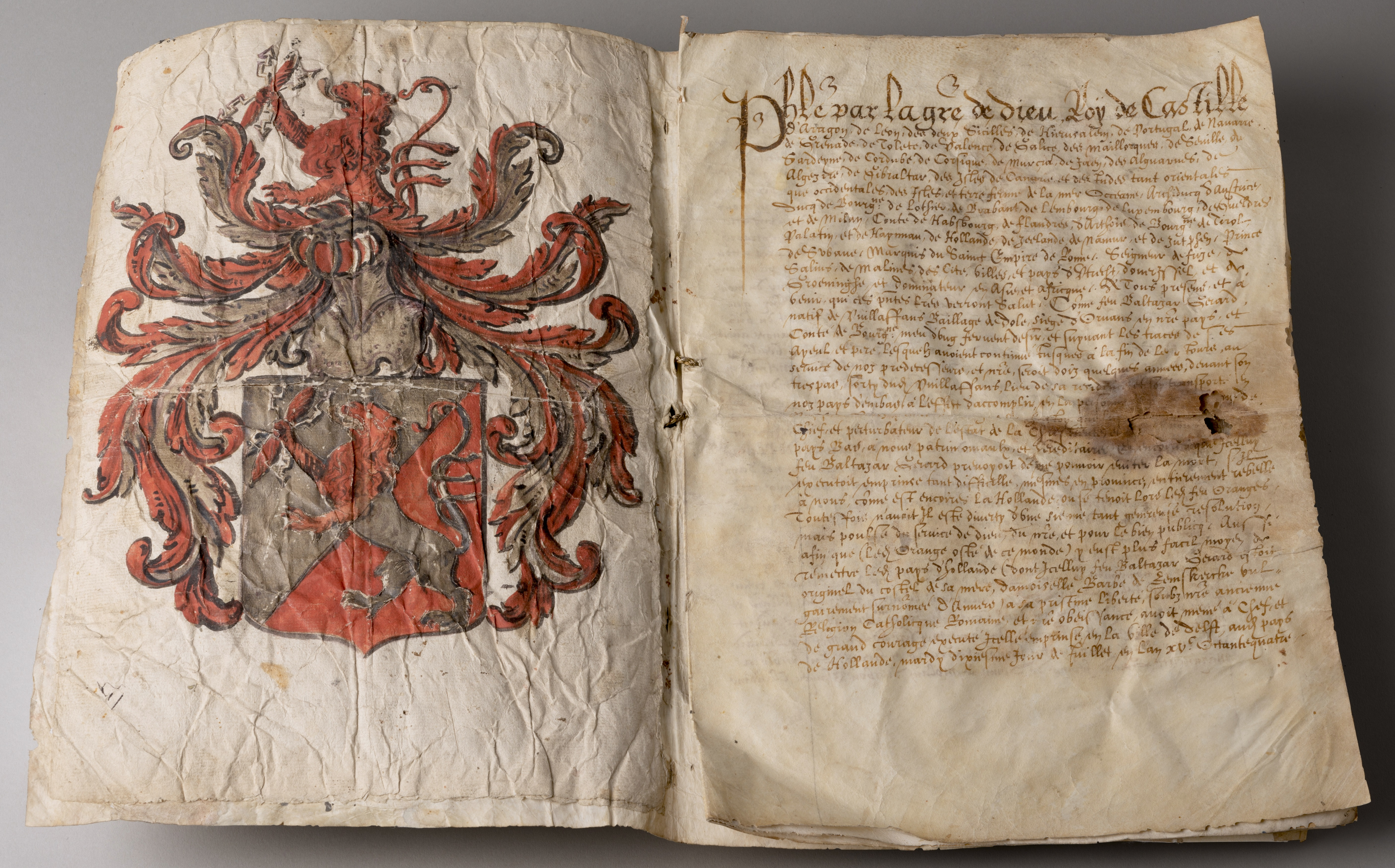
Reward letter of King Philip II of Spain to the family of Balthazar Gérard, 1590

Philip II gave Gérard's family three country estates near Vuillafans, Balthasar's own village, in Lievremont, Hostal, and Dampmartin in the Franche-Comté, and the family was raised to the peerage. The estates were all former properties of the Prince. But the King couldn't pay the promised bounty of 25,000 golden crowns, because the Crown of Spain was on the brink of bankruptcy. However, the estates were in 1595 returned to the Prince's first son, Philip William, who remained a Catholic and could therefore please the Catholic monarchs of Spain and France. The grant served the interests of Philip II, as Phillip William could become a rival to his brothers Maurits and Frederic Henry and a claimant to his properties in the lost United Provinces. As compensation, the family was granted a different estate near Vuillafans instead and 15,000 francs, but the family wasn't able to retain these lands either.

The apostolic vicar Sasbout Vosmeer tried to have Gérard canonized, to which end he removed the dead man's head and showed it to church officials in Rome, but the idea was rejected.

== Legacy ==
The village of Vuillafans renamed the street where Gérard was born "Rue Gérard" in his memory.
