= Museum Het Prinsenhof =

Former monastery and municipal museum in Delft, Netherlands

Coordinates: 52.012°N 4.354°E

File:Prinsenhof Delft.jpg

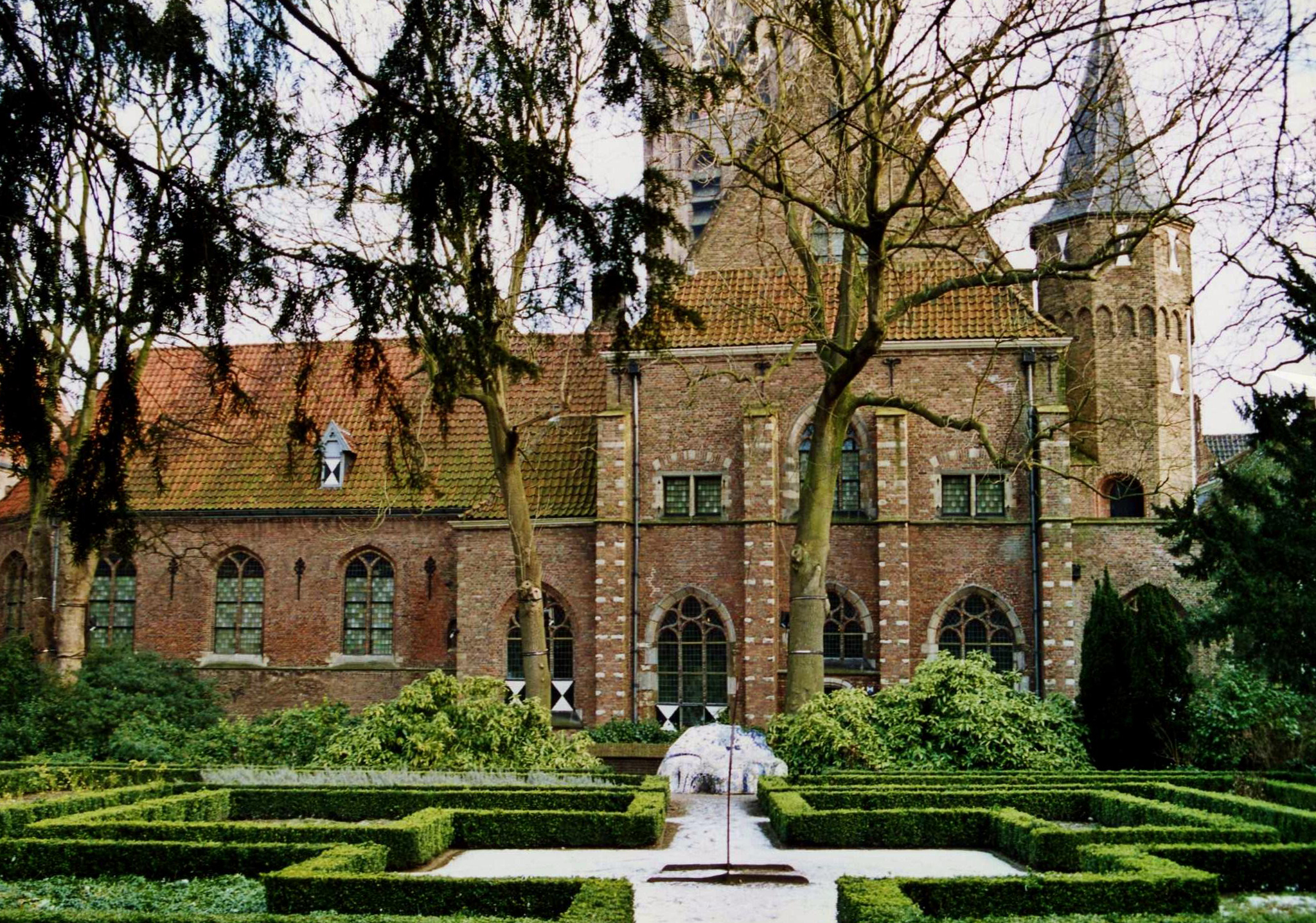
The Prinsenhof in Delft

Het Prinsenhof ("The Court of the Prince") is a museum in the city of Delft in the Netherlands. Formerly the monastery of St Agatha, the building changed purpose over time. The whole building came into the possession of Delft City Council by 1925, who gradually converted the building into a museum. Today, the museum shows a variety of art from Dutch Golden Age paintings, prints, ceramics and contemporary art.

== History of the Building ==
The building was constructed in the Middle Ages as a monastery. Later it served as a residence for the Dutch statesman William the Silent. William was assassinated in the Prinsenhof by Balthasar Gérard in 1584 - the holes in the wall made by the bullets at the main stairs are still visible.

== Organisation ==
The museum receives the majority of its funding from Delft City Council, and had overall costs of 5.834m Euros in 2023. It attracted just over 134,000 visitors in 2023. Janelle Moerman has been the director since 2017.

== Gallery ==
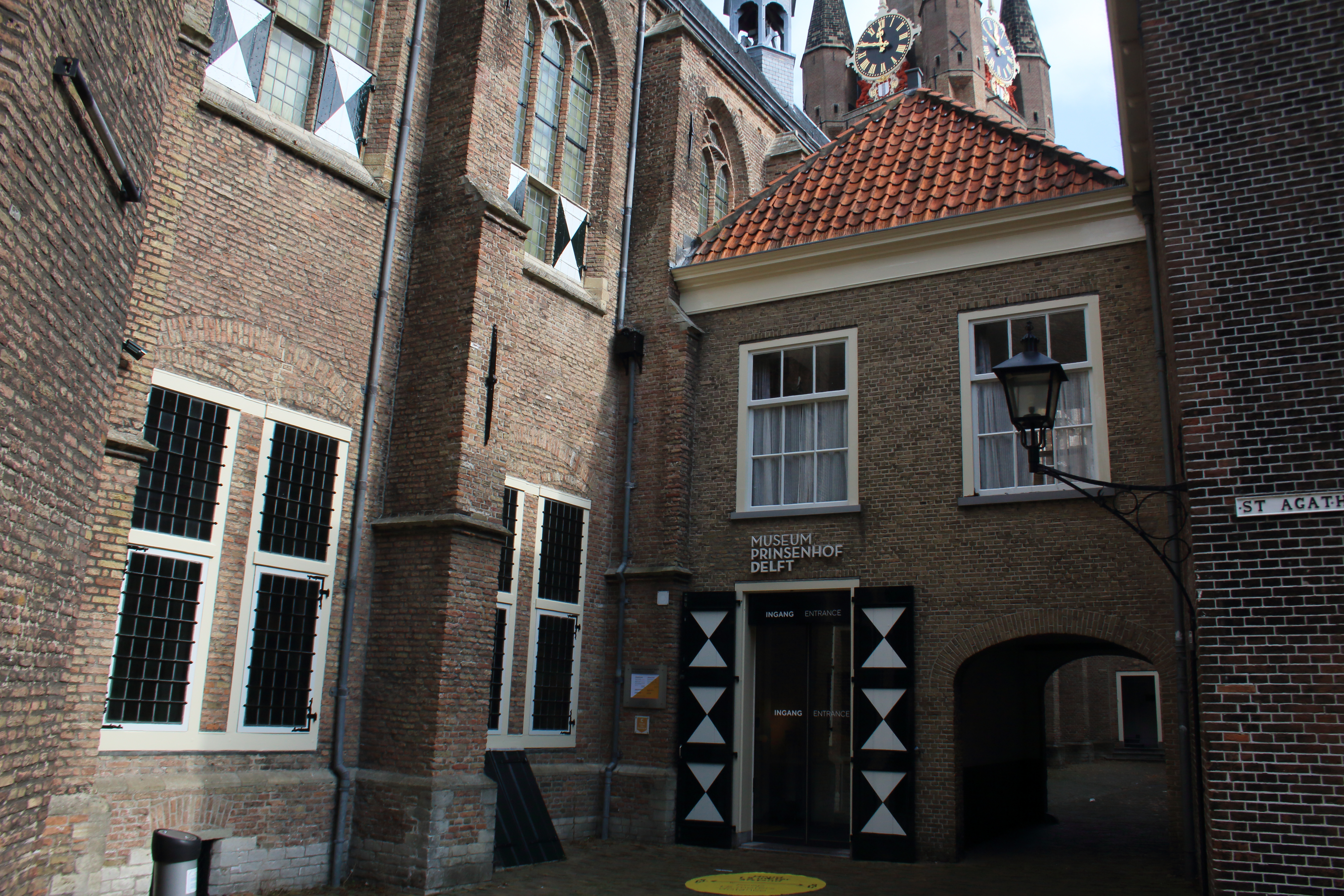
Entrance to the Prinsenhof Museum

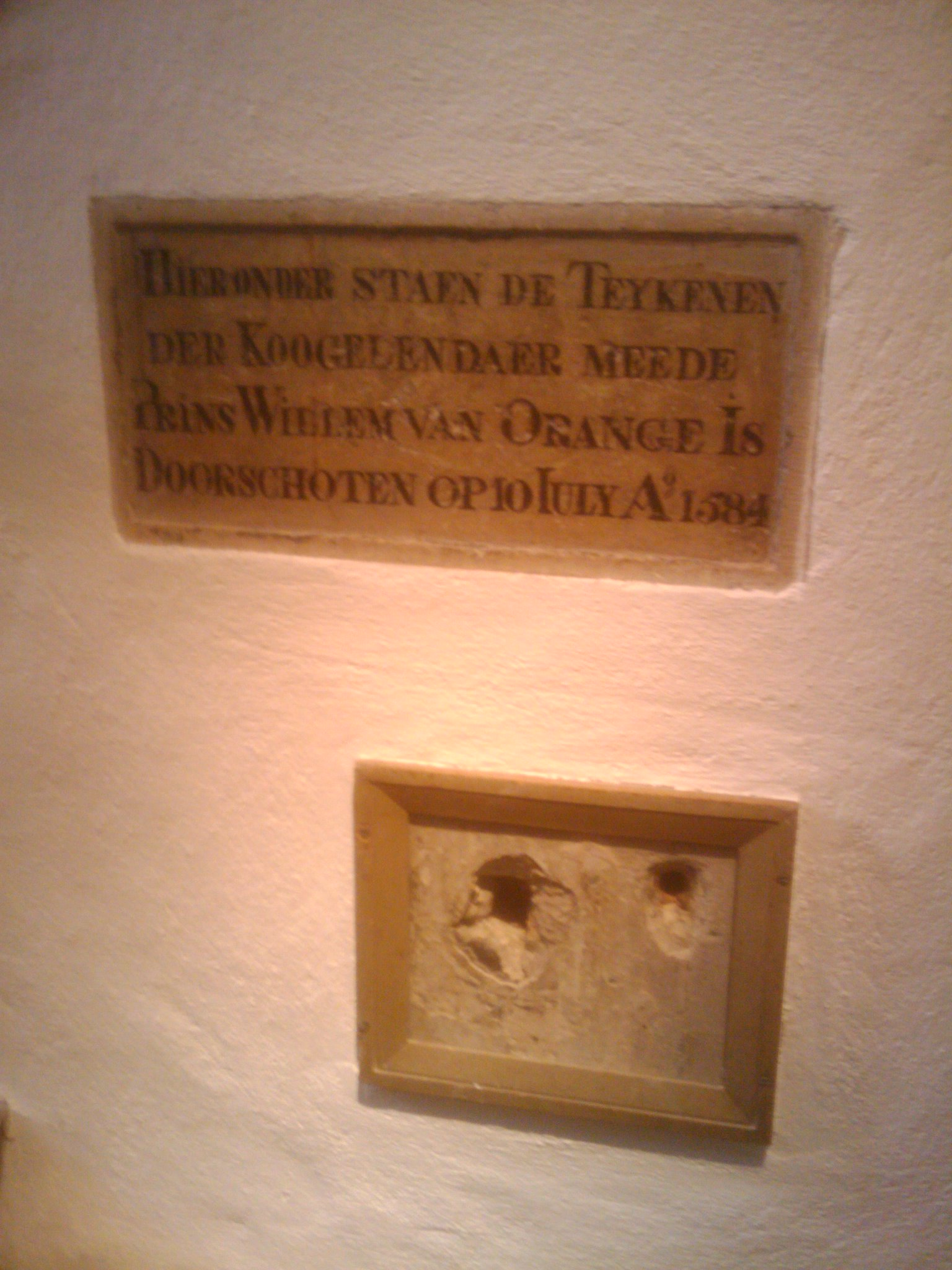
Bullet holes from the assassination of William the Silent at the main stairs of the Prinsenhof

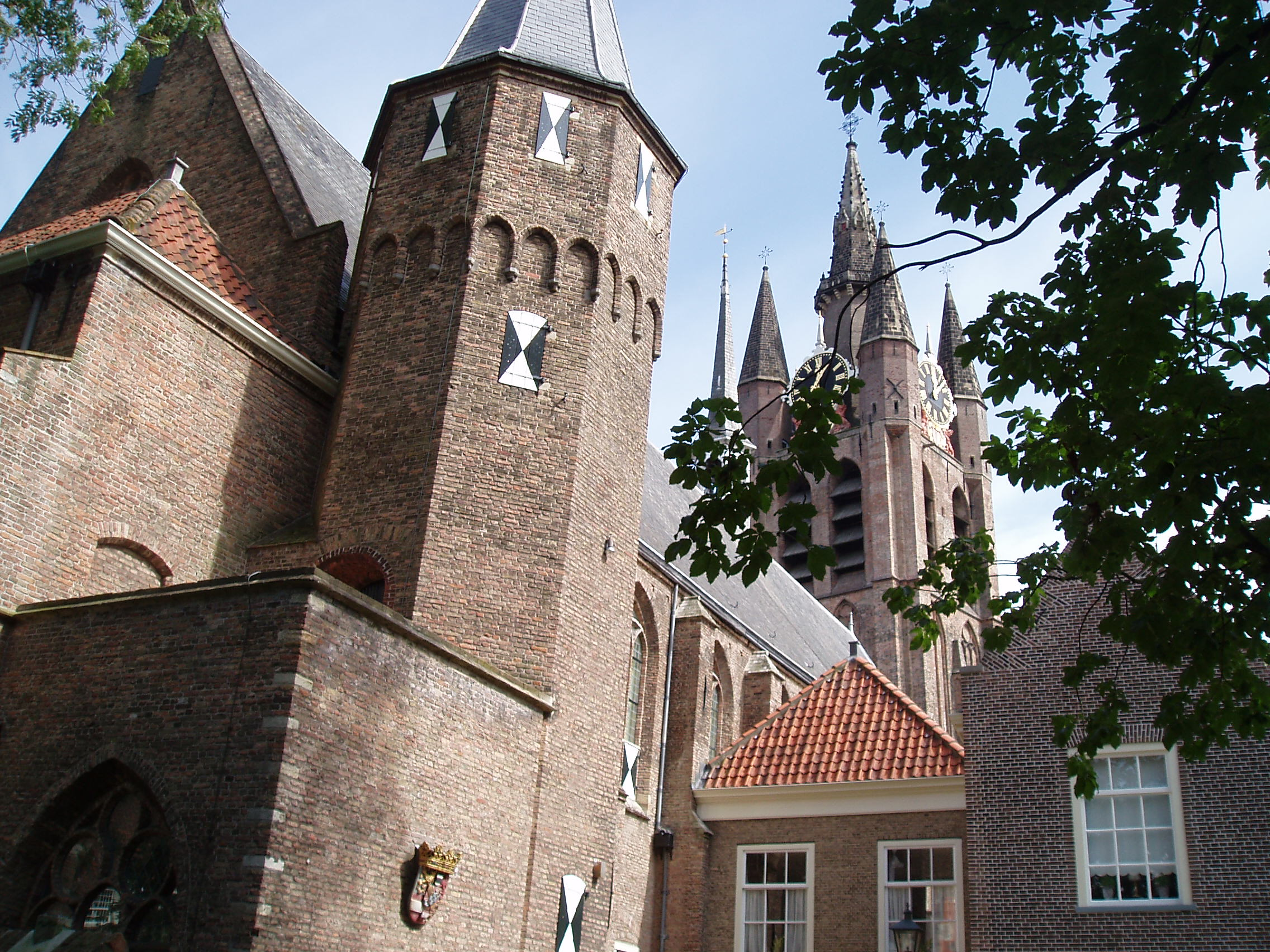
Former St. Agatha church

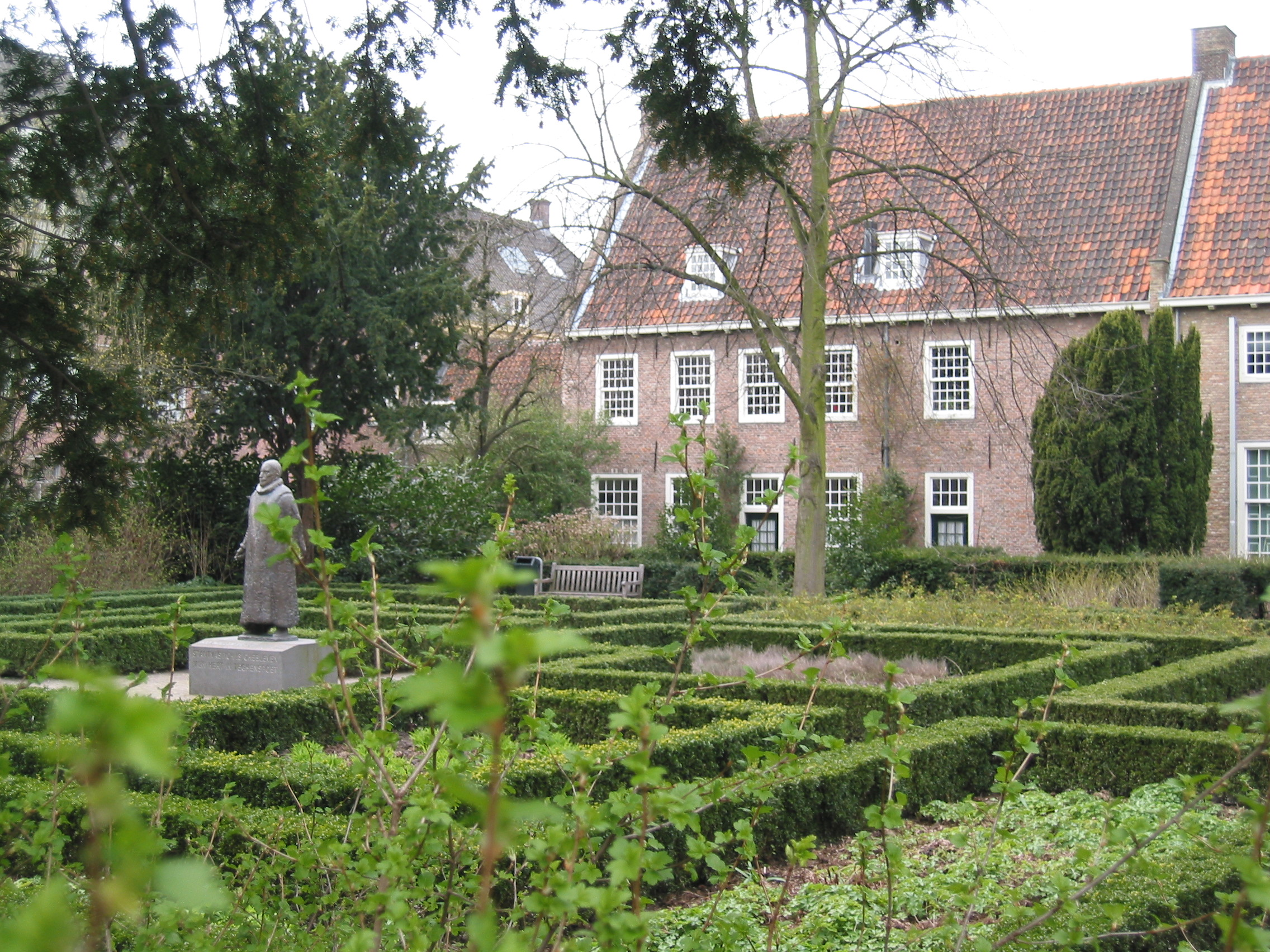
The garden of the Prinsenhof
