= Plesetsk Cosmodrome Site 35 =

Site 35/1
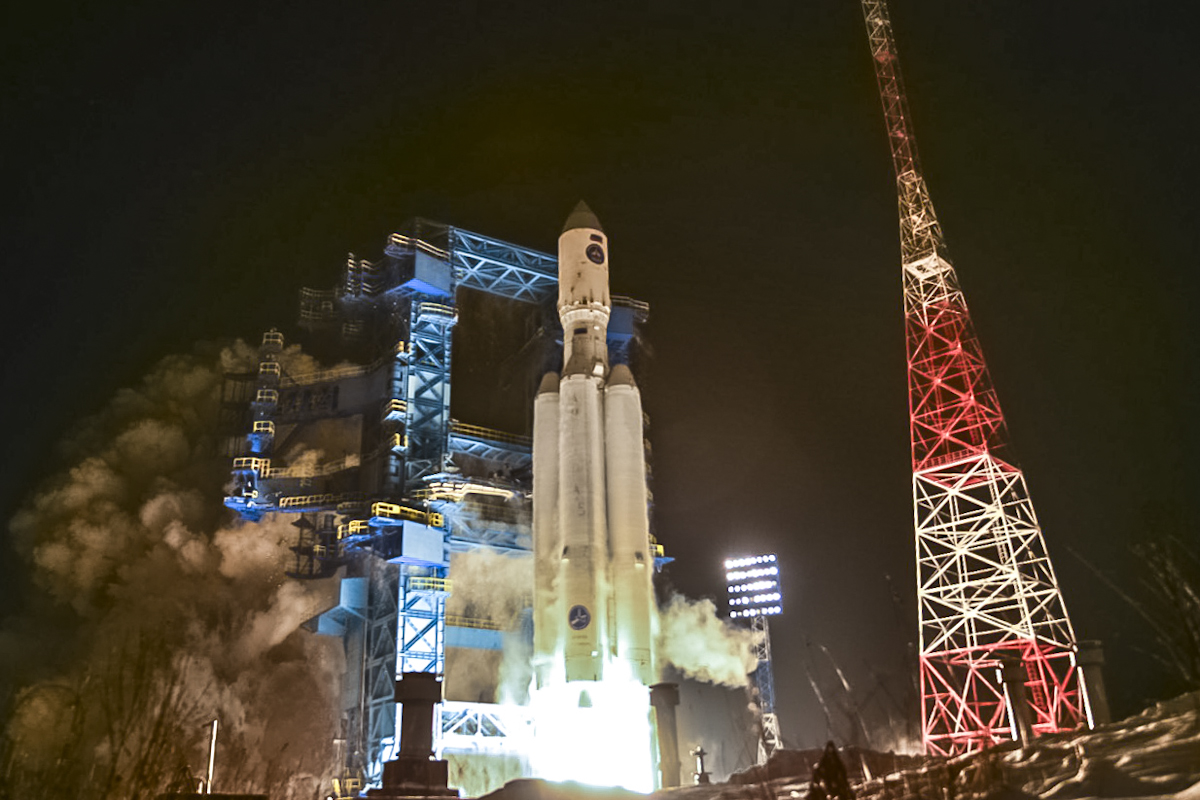
- The second test launch of an Angara A5 rocket from Site 35/1, December 2020
- Launch site: Plesetsk Cosmodrome
- Location: 62°55′38.35″N 40°34′29.63″E
- Operator: Russian Aerospace Defence Forces
- Total launches: 12
- Launch pad: 1
Launch history
- Status: Active
- Launches: 12
- First launch: 9 July 2014; Angara-1.2pp
- Last launch: 23 April 2026; Angara 1.2 (Kosmos Unknown Payloads)
- Associated rockets: Current: Angara; Cancelled: Zenit

Site 35 at the Plesetsk Cosmodrome is a launch complex used by the Angara rocket. The complex has a single launch pad, Site 35/1, which was first used for the maiden flight of the Angara in July 2014.

== Zenit ==
Site 35 was originally intended to support the Zenit rocket, which the Soviet Union saw as a replacement for the R-7 series. The construction of a Zenit launch complex at Plesetsk was authorised in 1976; however, development did not begin until the completion of Site 45 at the Baikonur Cosmodrome, which was also constructed for Zenit. Construction at Site 35 began in the mid-1980s, but the programme was abandoned following the dissolution of the Soviet Union. Following the cancellation of Zenit launches from Plesetsk, Russia had originally planned to use parts constructed for Site 35 to repair one of the Zenit pads at Baikonur that had been heavily damaged when a rocket lost thrust and fell back into the flame trench seconds after launch. Instead, the parts were eventually used on Sea Launch's Odyssey launch platform.

== Angara ==
When Russia began development of the Angara rocket, launch pads at both Plesetsk and Baikonur were planned. Several existing sites at Plesetsk were considered, including Site 41/1, Site 16/2, and Site 32; Site 35/1 was determined to be the most suitable. Construction began in 2004 but was not completed until April 2014. The Angara made its maiden flight—in the one-off Angara-1.2pp configuration—from Site 35/1 on 9 July 2014, flying a successful suborbital test mission. The first orbital launch from the site was the inaugural launch of the Angara A5 on 23 December 2014, which carried a mass simulator. A second orbital test flight of the Angara A5 took place almost six years later, on 14 December 2020.
