= Plesetsk Cosmodrome =

Spaceport in Mirny, Arkhangelsk Oblast, Russia

Plesetsk Cosmodrome
- Космодром «Плесецк»
- Russia
- Great emblem of the Plesetsk Cosmodrome

Site information
- Type: Spaceport
- Owner: Russian Ministry Of Defence
- Controlled by: Russian Space Forces
- Open to the public: No

Location
- Location in Russia##Location in Arkhangelsk Oblast
- Location within Russia Location within Arkhangelsk Oblast
- Coordinates: 62°55′32″N 40°34′40″E

Site history
- Built: 1957
- In use: 1957–present

Plesetsk Cosmodrome (Russian: Космодром «Плесецк», romanized: Kosmodrom "Plesetsk") is a Russian spaceport located in Mirny, Arkhangelsk Oblast, near the town of Plesetsk, from which it takes its name. Until 2025 and the commissioning of the Andøya base in Norway, it was the only operational orbital spaceport in Europe and the northernmost spaceport in the world. Originally developed as an intercontinental ballistic missile (ICBM) site for the R-7 missile, its strategic location approximately 800 kilometres (500 mi) north of Moscow was key to its selection.

Due to its high latitude, Plesetsk is particularly suited for specific types of satellite launches, such as those into Molniya orbits, and historically served as a secondary launch facility. Most Soviet orbital launches were conducted from Baikonur Cosmodrome, located in the Kazakh SSR. However, following the dissolution of the Soviet Union, Baikonur became part of Kazakhstan, which began charging Russia to lease the land for its use. As a result, Plesetsk has seen significantly increased activity since the 2000s, especially for launching military satellites.

== Overview ==
Plesetsk (62°55′32.32″N 40°34′40.36″E) is used especially for military satellites placed into high inclination and polar orbits since the range for falling debris is clear to the north which is largely uninhabited Arctic and polar terrain. It is situated in a region of taiga, or flat terrain with boreal pine forests.

The Soyuz rocket, Cosmos-3M, Rokot, Tsyklon, and Angara are launched from the Plesetsk Cosmodrome. The heavy Proton and Zenit rockets can only be land-launched from Baikonur (Zenit may also be launched at sea). As of 26 December 2017, all Zenit launches are discontinued and all activities are suspended.

== History ==
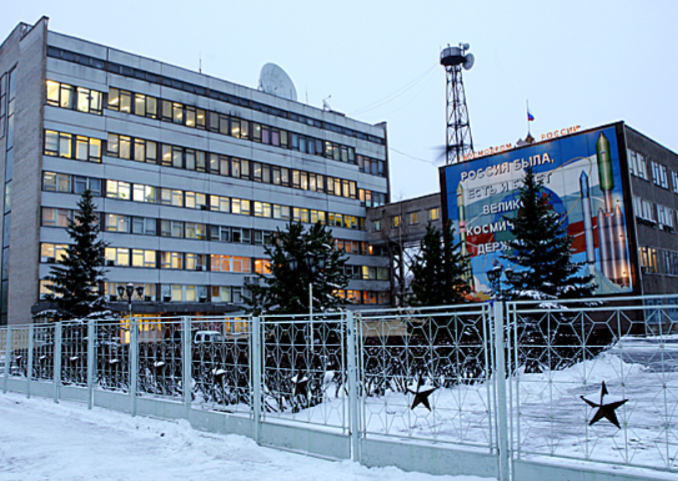
Administrative buildings at the cosmodrome

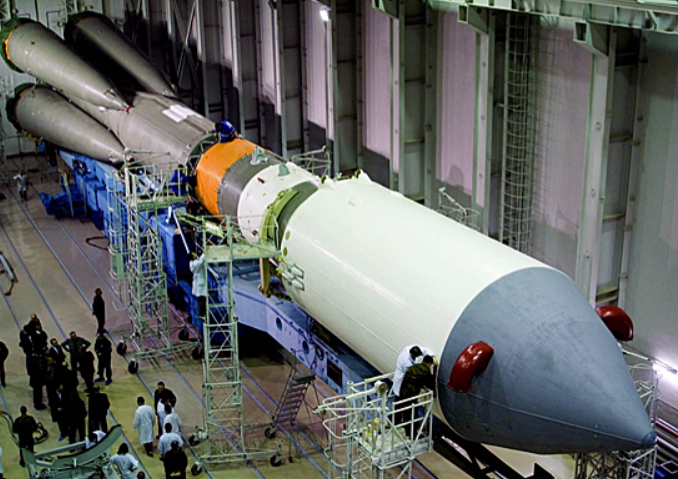
Soyuz rocket in the assembly and test building of the cosmodrome

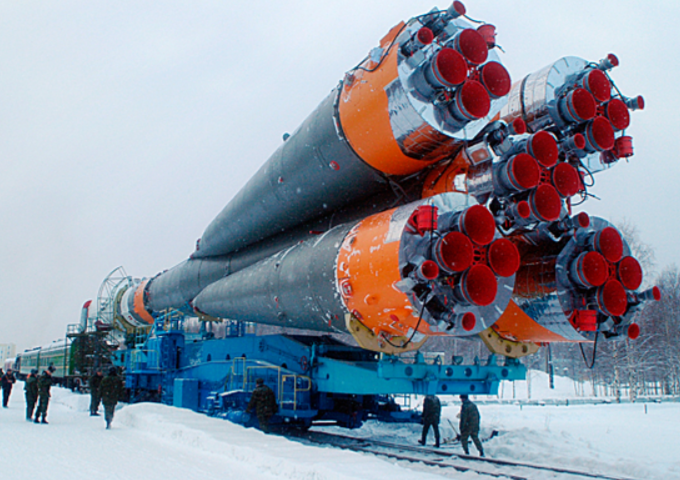
Soyuz rocket being transported to the launch pad

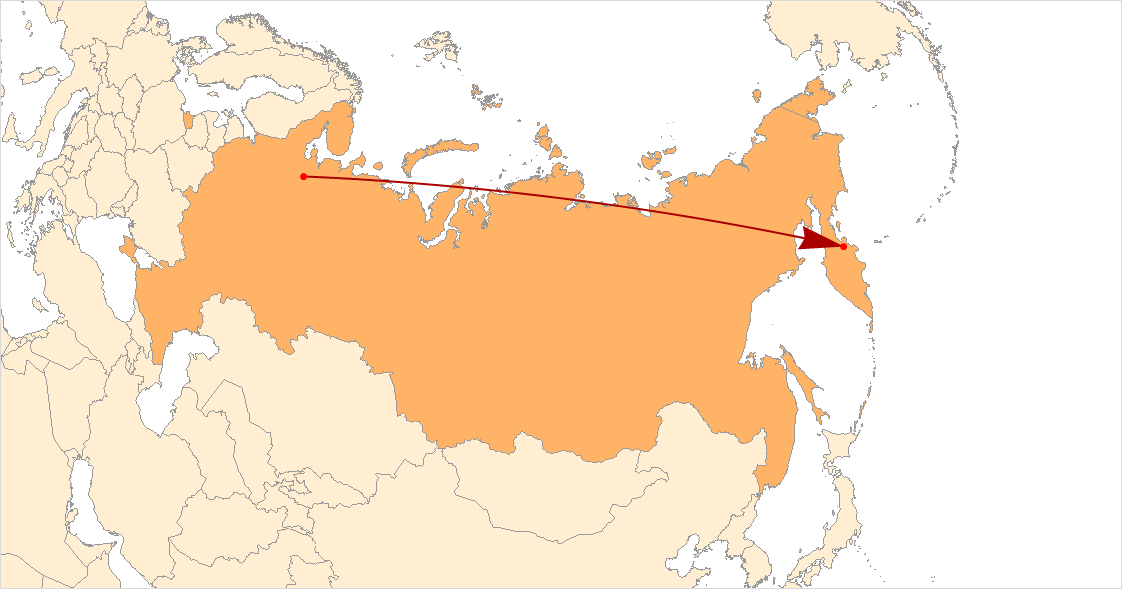
General trajectory of missiles from Plesetsk to the Kura Missile Test Range

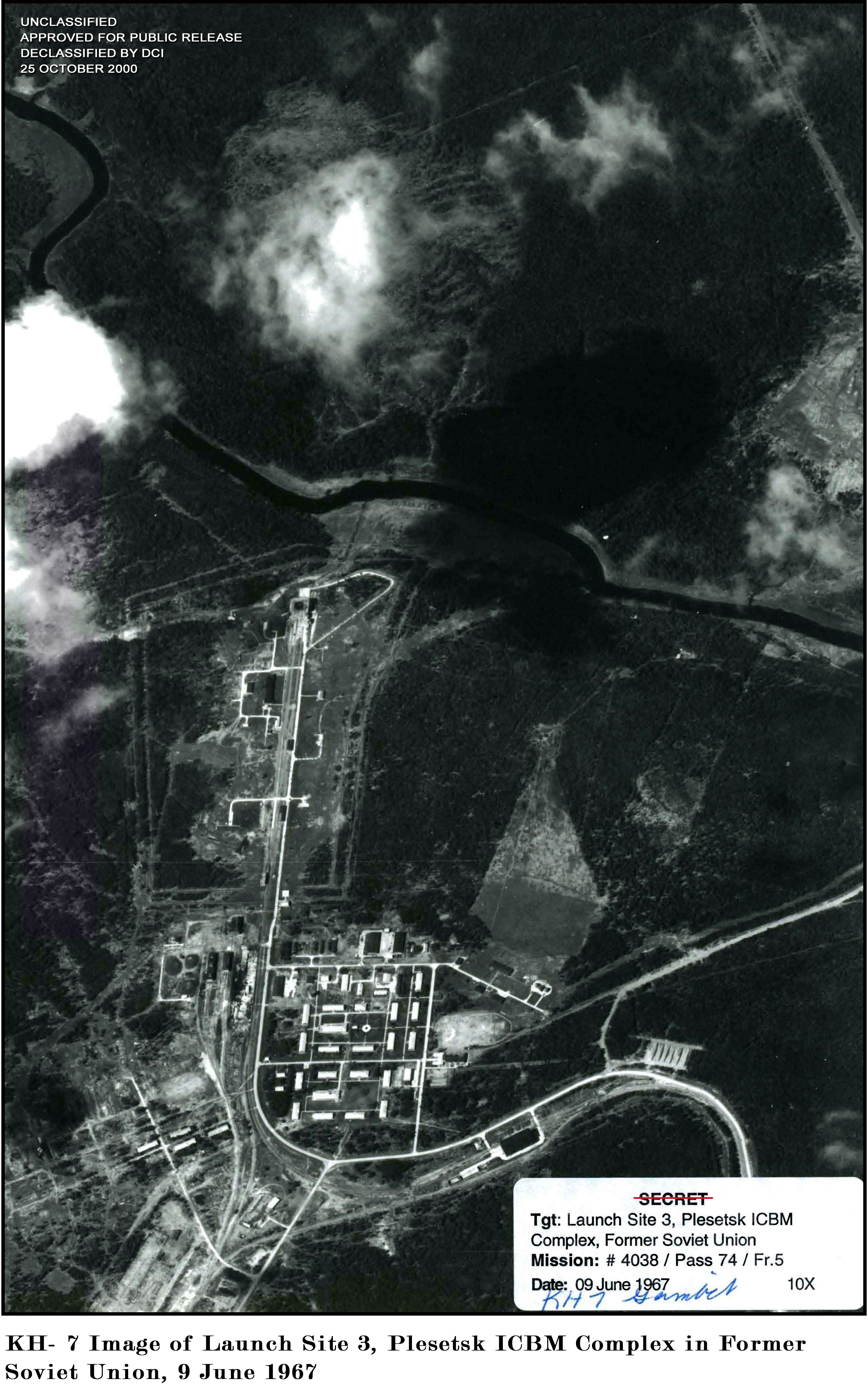
1967 photo of the Cosmodrome taken by a US spy satellite

Plesetsk Cosmodrome was originally developed by the Soviet Union as a launch site for intercontinental ballistic missiles under the leadership and supervision of lieutenant general Galaktion Alpaidze. On 11 January 1957, the Soviet government passed the resolution about the foundation of a special military object with the secret name "Angara". This secret object had to be situated in Plesetsk District, Arkhangelsk Oblast. It was named after the town of Plesetsk. The first Soviet Combat formation of intercontinental ballistic missiles R-7 of general designer Sergei Korolev had to be located in that place, in thick northern taiga to the south of Arkhangelsk. The official birthday of the proving ground was 15 July 1957. That day Colonel Gregorjev assumed his post as the missile unit commander. By 15 July 1961, four missile complexes for R-7 ICBMs were at combat status.

In January 1963, a joint decision of the Central Committee of the Communist Party of the Soviet Union and the USSR Council of Ministers created the "Research Proving Ground missile and space weapons USSR Ministry of Defense" near the Ilez railway station, Velsky District of Arkhangelsk Oblast. In the summer of 1963, the state leadership decided to use the Plesetsk launch facilities for launching spacecraft. In September 1963, the Council of Ministers of the USSR 3rd ALM and NIIP converted to "53 minutes Research Proving Ground". Three test management, employees of combat duty, tests of rocket and space complexes, holding and processing of telemetry and trajectory measurements.

And from 1964, on the basis of rocket connection started the establishment of research proving ground missiles and space weapons. Such conversion were the favourable geographical location and a significant number of systems already deployed by the end of 1964 were on duty, four launchers R-7A, seven PU P-16U, and three PU R-9A. Since then, the landfill has developed in two directions: rocket and space.

17 March 1966 was the space birthday of Plesetsk. That day was the first missile launching of the rocket booster Vostok with space vehicle Kosmos 112. Since that time, the rocket base "Angara" has become Plesetsk Cosmodrome. Construction started in 1957 and it was declared operational for R-7 rockets in December 1959. The urban-type settlement of Plesetsk in Arkhangelsk Oblast had a railway station, essential for the transport of missile components. A new town for the support of the facility was named Mirny, Russian for "peaceful". By 1997, more than 1,500 launches to space had been made from the site, more than from any other launch facility, although the usage has declined significantly since the break-up of the Soviet Union.

Because Plesetsk was used primarily for military launches, especially Zenit photo reconnaissance satellites, which were launched in large numbers during the 1970s-80s, the USSR did not admit to its existence, but it was discovered by British physics teacher Geoffrey Perry and his students at Kettering Grammar School, who carefully analysed the orbit of the Kosmos 112 satellite in 1966 and deduced it had not been launched from Baikonur Cosmodrome. Meteor 1-2 satellite launch from Plesetsk on 6 October 1969 was one of the earliest launches observed and photographed from Finland. After the end of the Cold War, it was learned that the CIA had begun to suspect the existence of an ICBM launch site at Plesetsk in the late 1950s. The Soviet Union did not officially admit the existence of Plesetsk Cosmodrome until 1983.

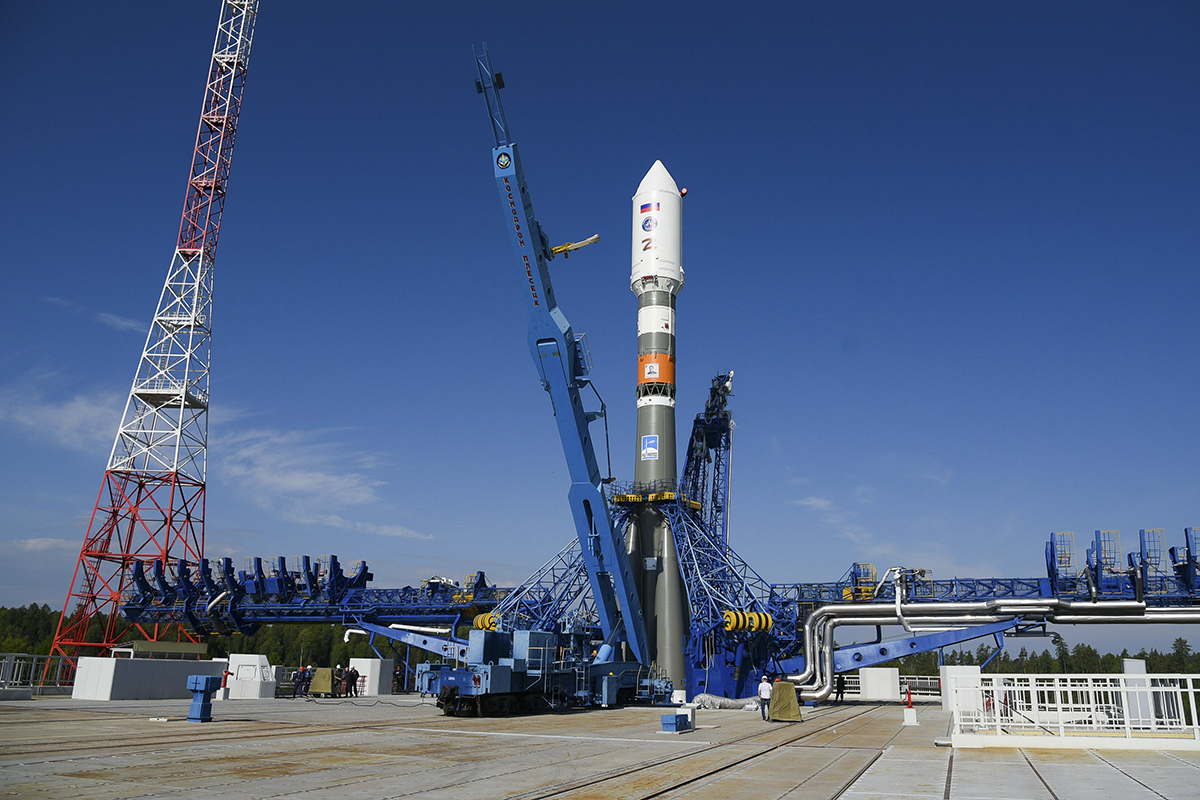
A Soyuz-2.1b rocket being prepared for launch from Site 43/3, August 2023

The use of the cosmodrome will likely increase in the future since there are concerns with security in operating the Baikonur Cosmodrome in now-independent Kazakhstan, which demands rent for its continued use. Plesetsk is not ideally suited for low inclination or geostationary launches because of its high latitude of 62° north (as compared to the Centre Spatial Guyanais at 5° north or the Kennedy Space Center at 28° 31' north). In addition, the high latitude means that lift capacity for boosters launched from Plesetsk is slightly lower than Baikonur launches. By the 2000s, Russia had completely phased out military launches from Baikonur. With some exceptions if for example the Proton-M launcher is needed.

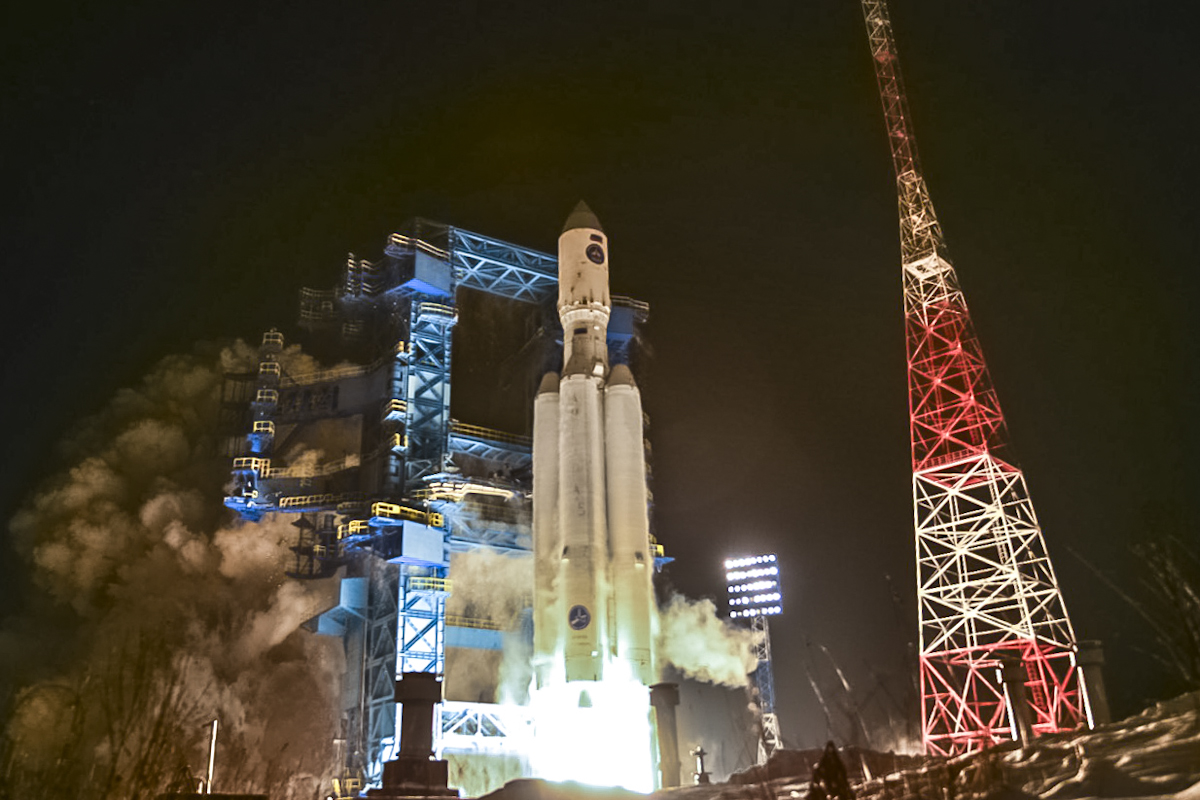
The second test launch of an Angara A5 rocket from Site 35/1, December 2020

The new all-Russian Angara rocket was designed to be launched primarily from Plesetsk (and also eventually from the Vostochny Cosmodrome).

In May 2007, a new ICBM, called the RS-24 has been tested and launched there, and is seen as eventually replacing the aging RS-18/UR-100Ns (SS-19 Stiletto) and RS-20/R-36Ms (SS-18 Satan) that are the backbone of Russia's missile forces.

In September 2011, Space Forces spokesman Colonel Alexei Zolotukhin said Russia will spend over 5 billion rubles (US$170 million) on the development and expansion of the cosmodrome in 2011. This includes the reconstruction of a local motorway and modernising the energy supply system. New facilities will be built, including a dormitory and hospital.

PL-19 Nudol anti-ballistic missile systems are located at the Cosmodrome, at the former launch site of the Tsyklon-2 rocket.

== Launch Sites ==
=== Site 16 (Inactive) ===
Site 16, also known as SK-2, is a launch complex at the Cosmodrome. It consists of a single pad, Site 16/2, and has been used by R-7 derived rockets since 1960. It has launched a total of 136 rockets across its lifespan.

Site 16 was originally built for use by R-7A Semyorka missiles, however no launches were conducted from the complex whilst it was operational. After its retirement from service in 1966, it was cannibalised for parts which were needed to repair Site 31/6 at the Baikonur Cosmodrome following the explosion of a Soyuz-U rocket.

Work to rebuild the complex began in 1979, and was completed in 1981. The first launch from Site 16 was conducted by a Molniya-M with an Oko satellite on 19 February 1981.

Site 16 was used for Soyuz-U and Molniya-M launches. It remained in use until 17 May 2012 when it saw its final launch, Kosmos 2480, a reconnaissance satellite on a Soyuz-U rocket.

=== Site 32 (Inactive) ===
Site 32 at the Cosmodrome is a launch complex formerly used by Tsyklon-3 carrier rockets. It consists of a two launch pads, Site 32/1 and Site 32/2, which were used between 1977 and 2009. It has the GRAU index 11P868.

In 1970, the building of a highly automated launch complex for Tsyklon-3 booster began at Site 32, which was designed by Omsk Transmash Design Bureau led by Chief Designer Vladimir Nikolayevich Chelomey. The first launch from Site 32 was conducted from pad 2 on 24 June 1977, with the first from Site 32/1 following on 23 January 1980. The last launch from Site 32/1 occurred on 28 December 2001. Site 32/2 was retired on 30 January 2009, along with the Tsyklon-3. All 122 Tsyklon-3 launches were conducted from the site. 57 launches were recorded as having been from pad 1 and 65 were recorded from pad 2.

=== Site 35 (Active – Angara) ===
Site 35 at the Plesetsk Cosmodrome is a launch complex used by Russia's Angara rocket. The complex has a single launch pad, Site 35/1, which was first used for the maiden flight of the Angara in July 2014.

Site 35 was originally intended to support the Zenit rocket, which the Soviet Union saw as a replacement for the R-7 series. The construction of a Zenit launch complex at Plesetsk was authorised in 1976; however, development did not begin until the completion of Site 45 at the Baikonur Cosmodrome, which was also constructed for Zenit. Construction at Site 35 began in the mid-1980s, but the programme was abandoned following the dissolution of the Soviet Union.

Following the cancellation of Zenit launches from Plesetsk, Russia had originally planned to use parts constructed for Site 35 to repair one of the Zenit pads at Baikonur that had been heavily damaged when a rocket lost thrust and fell back into the flame trench seconds after launch. Instead, the parts were eventually used on Sea Launch's Odyssey launch platform.

When Russia began development of the Angara rocket, launch pads at both Plesetsk and Baikonur were planned. Several existing sites at Plesetsk were considered, including Site 41/1, Site 16/2, and Site 32; Site 35/1 was determined to be the most suitable. Construction began in 2004 but was not completed until April 2014.

The Angara made its maiden flight—in the one-off Angara-1.2pp configuration—from Site 35/1 on 9 July 2014, flying a successful suborbital test mission. The first orbital launch from the site was the inaugural launch of the Angara A5 on 23 December 2014, which carried a mass simulator. A second orbital test flight of the Angara A5 took place almost six years later, on 14 December 2020.

=== Site 41 (Dismantled) ===
Site 41, also known as Lesobaza and SK-1, was a launch complex at the Plesetsk Cosmodrome in Russia. It consisted of a single pad, Site 41/1, and was used by R-7 derived rockets between 1959 and 1989.

Site 41 was originally built for use by R-7A Semyorka missiles. During the Cuban Missile Crisis, an armed missile was placed on Site 41. It would have had a response time of 8–12 hours should an order have been given to launch it. No launches were conducted from Site 41 whilst it was operational.

In 1963, the complex was converted for use by carrier rockets. The first launch from the complex was a suborbital test of an R-7A Semyorka missile, on 14 December 1965. The first orbital launch from the complex occurred on 17 March 1966, when a Vostok-2 rocket launched Kosmos 112. In total, 308 orbital and two suborbital launches were conducted from the complex, using R-7A, Vostok-2, Vostok-2M, Voskhod and Soyuz-U rockets. The last launch to use the complex was of a Soyuz-U with Bion 9 on 15 September 1989. Since this launch, the pad has been disassembled.

=== Site 43 (Active – Soyuz) ===
Site 43, also known as SK-3 and SK-4, is a launch complex at the Plesetsk Cosmodrome in Russia. It consists of a two pads, Sites 43/3 and 43/4, and has been used by R-7 derived rockets since the early 1960s.

The site was originally built for use by R-7A Semyorka missiles. The first launch to use the complex was an R-7A test on 21 December 1965, from Site 43/3. The first launch from 43/4 followed on 25 July 1967.

After its retirement from service as a missile base, it was converted for use as a space launch complex. The first orbital launch was of a Voskhod rocket with Kosmos 313 on 3 December 1969.

Both pads were damaged by explosions in the 1980s. At 16:01 UTC on 18 March 1980, 48 people were killed when a Vostok-2M exploded during fueling operations at Pad 4. The disaster injured dozens more, while damaging the pad so severely that it was not used again until 1984. On 18 June 1987, a Soyuz-U rocket exploded at liftoff on Pad 3. Both were rebuilt, and are in service as of 2009.

== List of launchpads ==
- Pad 16/2: R-7, Molniya, Soyuz-U – 62.960°N 40.683°E
- Pad 32/1 (inactive since 2001): Tsyklon-3 – 62.907°N 40.787°E
- Pad 32/2 (inactive since 2009): Tsyklon-3 – 62.906°N 40.790°E
- Pad 35/1 (2014- ): Angara (previous development for Zenit) – 62.927°N 40.575°E
- Pad 41/1 (1965–1989): R-7, Vostok-2, Vostok-2M, Voskhod, Soyuz-U – 62.941°N 40.529°E
- Pad 43/3: R-7, Vostok-2M, Voskhod, Molniya-M, Soyuz-U – 62.927°N 40.450°E
- Pad 43/4: R-7, Vostok-2M, Voskhod, Molniya-M, Soyuz-U, Soyuz-M, Soyuz-2, Soyuz-2-1v – 62.929°N 40.457°E
- Pad 131/1 (1967–1969): Kosmos-3M, R-14 – 62.910°N 40.694°E
- Pad 132/1: Kosmos-3, Kosmos-3M – 62.883°N 40.869°E
- Pad 132/2: Kosmos-3, Kosmos-3M – 62.883°N 40.872°E
- Pad 133/1: Kosmos-2I – 62.887°N 40.847°E
- Pad 133/3: Kosmos-3M, Rokot – 62.887°N 40.850°E
- Pad 167: mobile ICBM: Topol/Topol-M/RS-24 – 63.008379°N 41.547953°E
- Pad 168: mobile ICBM: Topol – 63.008509°N 41.554723°E

== List of active launch silos ==
- Plesetsk Cosmodrome Site Yubileynaya: ICBM: Topol-M/RS-24 – 62.889450°N 41.759721°E
- Plesetsk Cosmodrome Site Yuzhnaya: ICBM: Topol-M/RS-24 – 62.870510°N 41.780921°E

== Accidents ==
FIRMS imagery of the 20 and 21 September 2024 fire at a Plesetsk test site

- On 26 June 1973, 9 people were killed by an explosion of Kosmos-3M rocket, ready for launch.
- On 18 March 1980, 48 people were killed by an explosion of a Vostok-2M rocket with a Tselina satellite, during a fuelling operation.
- On 15 October 2002, a Soyuz-U carrying the ESA Foton-M1 project failed to launch and exploded, killing one.
- On 19 or 20 September 2024, a test of an RS-28 Sarmat failed destroying a launch silo with its surrounding facilities and causing a fire detected by NASA's FIRMS. Maxar imagery showed a 62 m (203 ft) wide crater where the launch silo had been.

== See also ==
- Vostochny Cosmodrome
- Baikonur Cosmodrome
- Svobodny Cosmodrome
- Kapustin Yar
