= Angara-1.2pp =

Russian rocket mission

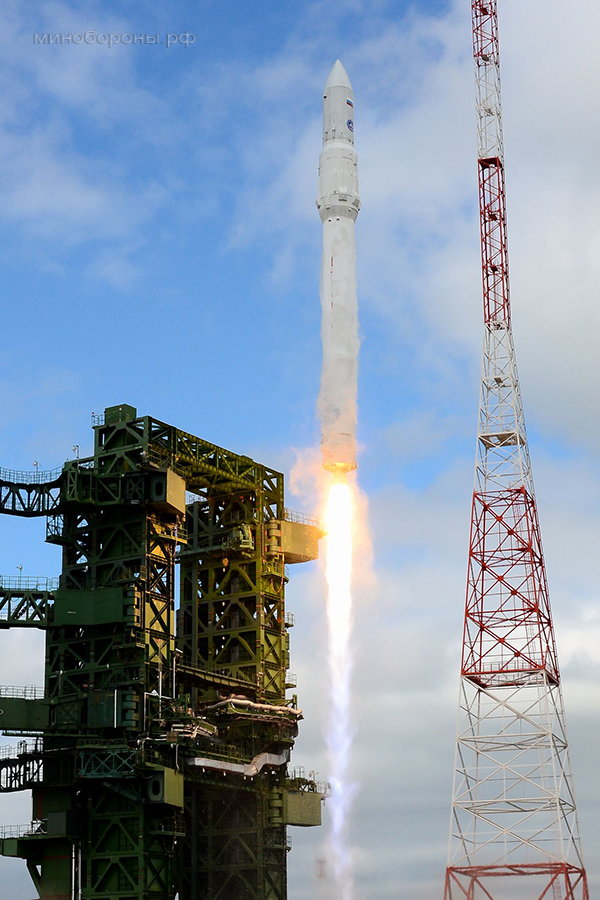
- Angara-1.2pp during test flight
- Mission type: Test flight
- Operator: Khrunichev/VKO
- Mission duration: 21 minutes
- Range: 5,700 kilometres (3,500 mi)

Start of mission
- Launch date: 9 July 2014, 12:00 UTC
- Rocket: Angara-1.2pp
- Launch site: Plesetsk 35/1
- Contractor: Khrunichev

Payload
- Mass simulator
- Mass: 1,430 kilograms (3,150 lb)

The flight of Angara-1.2pp (Russian: Ангара-1.2 первого пуска; Angara-1.2 pervogo puska meaning Angara-1.2 first launch) was the maiden flight of Russia's Angara series of rockets. This flight was conducted successfully on 9 July 2014. A unique configuration with parts taken from the Angara-1 and Angara-A5 rockets, the suborbital mission served to flight test each of the new stages developed for the rocket ahead of its operational use.

== Background ==
The Angara is the first new rocket built by Russia since the end of the Soviet Union, and is intended to replace several older rockets including the Proton-M, Zenit and Rokot, as well as ensure independent Russian access to geosynchronous orbit from Plesetsk. The development of the Angara launch vehicle was first approved in 1992.

The Angara-1.2pp rocket consisted of two Universal Rocket Modules (URMs), a URM-1 first stage and a URM-2 second stage. Although it was the first full Angara to fly, three modified URM-1 stages had previously been used in Naro-1 launches; a joint project between Russia and South Korea. It was the first flight for the full power RD-191 engine; the Naro launches used a reduced thrust variant, the RD-151. This was also the first flight for the URM-2, though its RD-0124A engine was an almost identical derivative of the RD-0124 used on Soyuz-2 rockets.

The configuration used for the 1.2pp flight was unique to that mission. For orbital launches the URM-2 upper stage will only be flown on the Angara A5, which will have four additional URM-1 boosters to provide additional thrust. The operational Angara-1.2 will make use of a modified Blok-I stage which is also used by the Soyuz-2-1b and Soyuz-2-1v.

== Flight ==
Angara-1.2pp was launched at 12:00 UTC (16:00 local time) on 9 July 2014. It flew from Site 35/1 at the Plesetsk Cosmodrome following an eastward suborbital trajectory 5,700 kilometres (3,500 mi) over northern Russia and the Barents Sea towards the Kura Test Range, where the flight concluded 22 minutes later with reentry and the impact of any surviving debris. Launches from Plesetsk to Kura are often used for Russian missile tests, so this trajectory allowed the rocket to be tracked by existing systems during its flight. Shortly after launch the Russian military confirmed that the launch had been successful.

An earlier attempt to launch the rocket had been made on 27 June; however, the launch was scrubbed in the late stages of the countdown. The launch, which had been scheduled for 11:15, was called off with 79 seconds left to go, after a problem with a pump caused a loss of oxidiser pressure. The rocket was subsequently removed from the launch pad and returned to its hangar for repairs.

Date/time (UTC)	Configuration	Serial number	Launch pad	Outcome
Date/time (UTC)	Payload	Separation orbit	Operator	Function
Date/time (UTC)	Remarks			
9 July 2014; 12:00 UTC	Angara 1.2PP	71601	Plesetsk Cosmodrome, Site 35	Success
9 July 2014; 12:00 UTC	1,430 kg (3,150 lb) mass simulator	Suborbital	Roscosmos	Suborbital test flight
9 July 2014; 12:00 UTC	Non-standard Angara 1.2PP allowed flight testing of both URM-1 and URM-2			

== See also ==
- Angara-1.2
- Angara A5
