= Vostok-2M =

Soviet Union space launch vehicle, 1964–1991

Vostok-2M (8A92M)
- Vostok-2M rocket
- Function: Small-lift launch vehicle
- Manufacturer: OKB-1
- Country of origin: Soviet Union

Size
- Stages: 3

Capacity

Payload to SSO
- Mass: 3,800 kg (8,400 lb)

Associated rockets
- Family: R-7

Launch history
- Status: Retired
- Launch sites: Baikonur, Site 31/6; Plesetsk, Sites 41/1, 16/2, 43/3 & 43/4
- Total launches: 93
- Success(es): 92
- Failure: 1
- First flight: 28 August 1964
- Last flight: 29 August 1991
- Carries passengers or cargo: Meteor · Resurs · Tselina-D

Boosters (First stage) – Block B, V, G & D (Note: This is a transliteration of the second through fifth letters of the Cyrillic alphabet (Б, В, Г, Д). A sense-for-sense translation would correspond to the second through fifth letters of the Latin alphabet, 'Block B, C, D & E'.)
- No. boosters: 4
- Powered by: 1 × RD-107-8D74K
- Maximum thrust: 995.3 kN (223,800 lb_{f})
- Total thrust: 3,981.2 kN (895,000 lb_{f})
- Burn time: 120 seconds
- Propellant: LOX / RP-1

Second stage (core) – Block A
- Powered by: 1 × RD-108-8D75K
- Maximum thrust: 940.4 kN (211,400 lb_{f})
- Burn time: 305 seconds
- Propellant: LOX / RP-1

Third stage
- Powered by: 1 × RD-0109
- Maximum thrust: 54.52 kN (12,260 lb_{f})
- Burn time: 400 seconds
- Propellant: LOX / RP-1

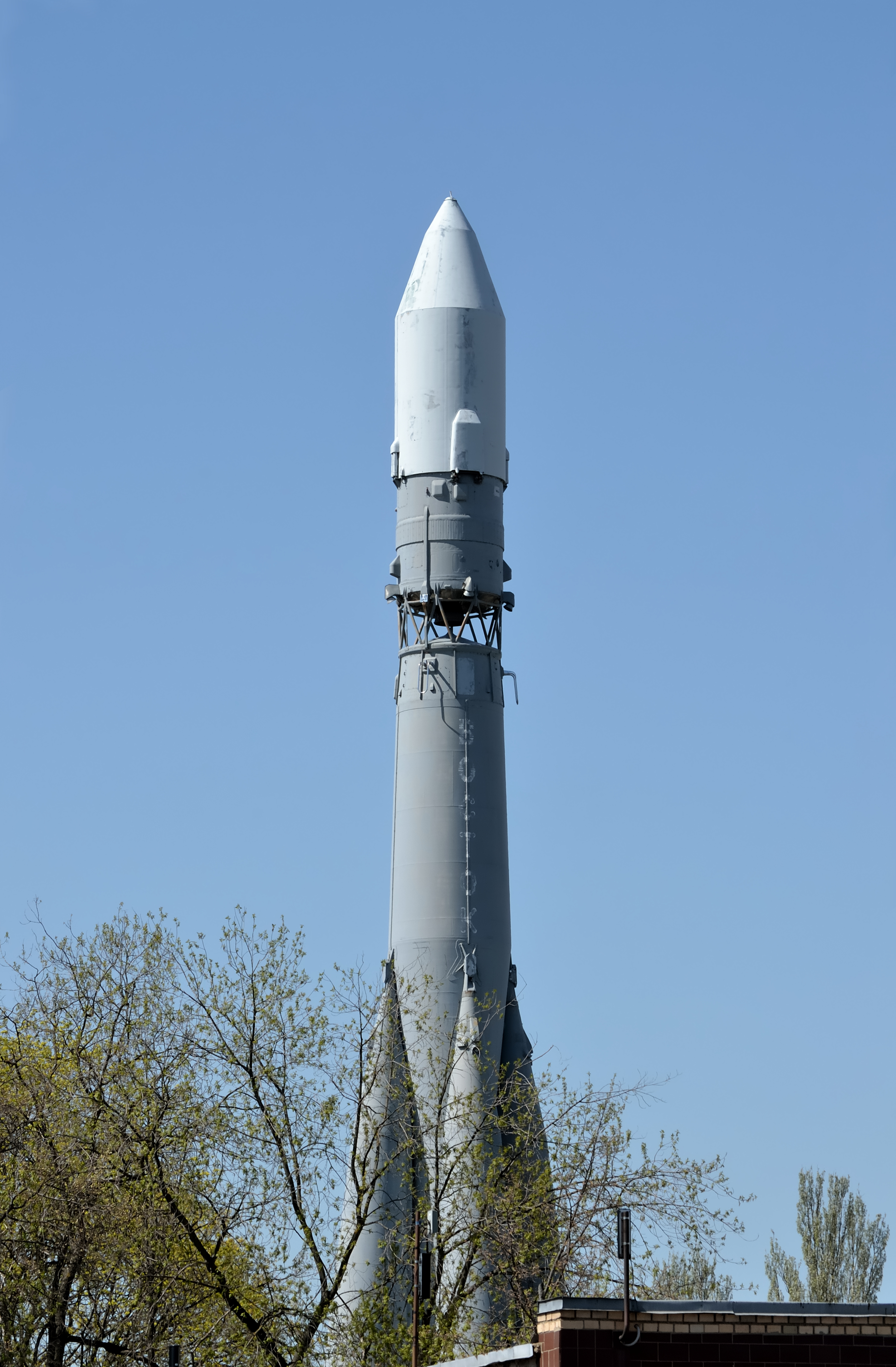
Vostok-2M in Korolyov, Moscow Oblast

Vostok-2M (Russian: Восток-2M, lit. 'East-2M', GRAU index: 8A92M) was an expendable carrier rocket used by the Soviet Union between 1964 and 1991. Ninety-three were launched, of which one failed. Another was destroyed before launch. It was originally built as a specialised version of the earlier Vostok-2, for injecting lighter payloads into higher Sun-synchronous orbits. It was a member of the R-7 family of rockets, and the last Vostok.

The Vostok-2M was similar to the Vostok-2 booster but the adapter portion of the Blok E stage remained attached to the payload and the guidance system was modified specially to assist in putting payloads in sun-synchronous orbits. Vehicles flown in 1967 and later used the 8D74M engines or the 11D511 in 1973 and later.

The Vostok-2M made its maiden flight on 28 August 1964 from Site 31/6 at the Baikonur Cosmodrome, successfully placing Kosmos 44, a Meteor weather satellite into orbit. A total of 93 were launched from 1964 to '91. Its only launch failure occurred on 1 February 1969, when the launch of a Meteor failed due to an upper stage problem.

At 16:01 GMT on 18 March 1980, a Vostok-2M exploded during fueling at Plesetsk Site 43/4, ahead of the launch of a Tselina-D satellite, killing 48 people who were working on the rocket at the time. A filter in a hydrogen peroxide tank of the third stage had accidentally been soldered with lead instead of tin, with the catalytically active lead solder on the filter causing the explosion upon contact hydrogen peroxide. As a consequence, the H_{2}O_{2} broke down, overheated, and melted the solder, causing pieces to fall into the H_{2}O_{2} storage tank and cause a runaway chemical reaction. This led to a fire inside the third stage and eventual explosion which resulted in the complete destruction of the launch vehicle and severe pad damage (LC-43 did not host another launch for three years).

Vostok-2M launches occurred from Site 31/6 at Baikonur, and Sites 41/1, 16/2, 43/3 and 43/4 at Plesetsk. The Vostok-2M was retired in 1991 in favour of standardization on the Soyuz-U and U2 rockets. The final flight was conducted on 29 August and carried the IRS-1B satellite for the Indian Space Research Organization.
