= Juan de Jáuregui (assassin) =

Attempted assassin of William of Orange (1562–1582)

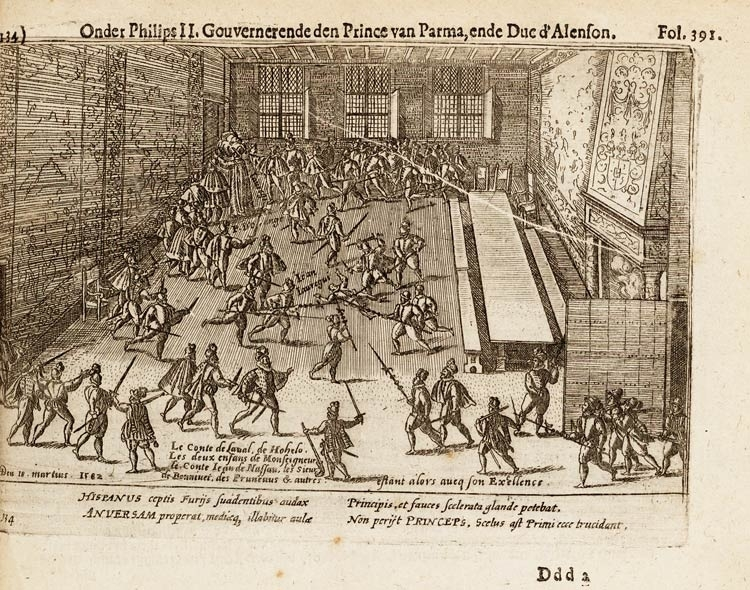
Juan de Jáuregui attempting to assassinate William the Silent, prince of Orange, by Frans Hogenberg, 1582 (published in 1616)

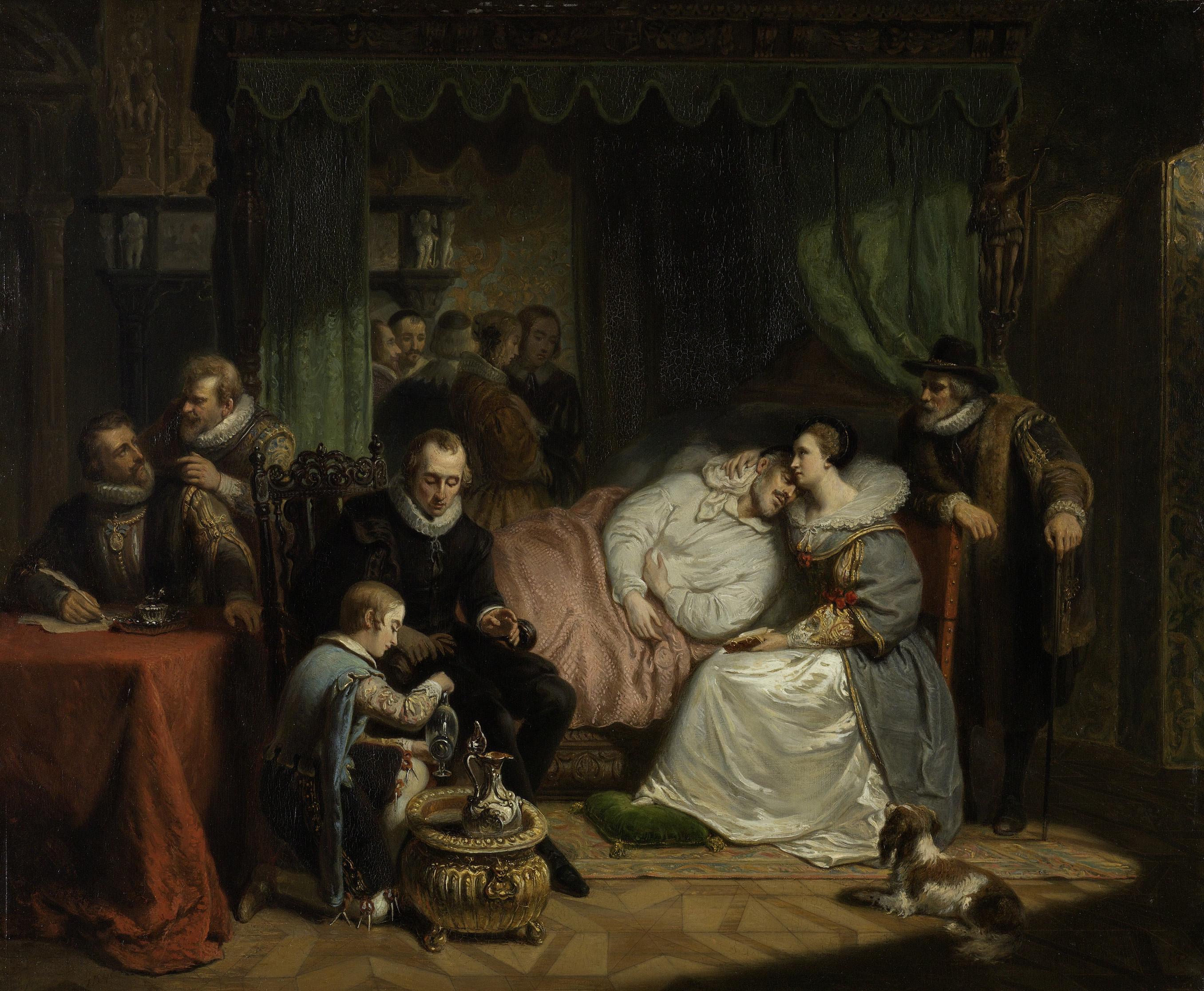
Prince William I after the failed assassination attempt by Jean Jaurequi in 1582, nursed by Charlotte de Bourbon, history painting by Nicolaas Pieneman, 1840.

Juan de Jáuregui (Bilbao, 1562 – Antwerpen, March 18, 1582) was a Biscayan accounting assistant known for his unsuccessful 1582 assassination attempt in Antwerp upon William the Silent, Prince of Orange.

In 1582, Jáuregui was in the service of a Spanish fur merchant, Gaspar de Añastro from Vitoria, who resided at Antwerp. De Añastro had lost three ships, and was tempted by the reward that Philip II of Spain had promised in a 1580 Ban for the assassination of William, the leader of the uprising against Spanish Habsburg control of the Spanish Netherlands.

Philip offered 25,000 crowns and the habit of the Order of Santiago to whoever should kill the Prince of Orange. De Añastro lacked the courage to undertake the task personally. Instead, with the help of his 19-year-old cashier Antonio de Venero of Bilbao, and the Dominican friar Antonio Timmerman from Dunkirk, he persuaded his poor accounting assistant Jáuregui to attempt the murder in exchange for 2,877 crowns. Jáuregui had been convinced not only that heaven would smile on his attempt, but that he would become invisible immediately afterwards, and thus escape easily.

On Sunday, March 18, 1582, as the Prince came out of his dining-room at the Prince's castle in Antwerp, Jáuregui offered him a petition. As soon as William took it into his hand Jáuregui fired a pistol at his head. Although the pistol was badly designed and malfunctioned, a bullet pierced the Prince's neck below the right ear and passed out at the left jawbone. A knight in the Prince's retinue instantly transfixed Jáuregui with his sword, and the attempted assassin was set upon and killed by the halberdiers.

Upon a search on the corpse, he was found to carry two pieces of castor fur, several crosses and amulets, a green wax candle—which held associations as typical accoutrements of wizardry—and several papers written in Spanish.

Though wounded, William survived. His recovery was slow, and he was nursed by his wife Charlotte of Bourbon—until her death on May 5—and his sister Mary of Nassau.

William asked a merciful execution for the surviving conspirators. Venero and Timmerman were garotted on March 28, then decapitated and quartered for exhibition. De Añastro, however, escaped punishment. He had left for Wallonia on March 13. Despite William's survival, he claimed the reward before Alessandro Farnese, Duke of Parma and Piacenza, and received the rewards Promised in Philip's Ban of 1580: 25,000 crowns, noble title, and pardon.

The case was published in French, Flemish and Spanish by Christopher Plantin as Bref recueil de l'assassinat, commis en la personne du Très Illustre Prince, Monseigneur le Prince d'Orange, Conte de Nassau, Marquis de la Vere, etc par Iean Iauregui Espaignol, Antwerp, 1582.

Among the published writings, there was a religious vouch promising donations to Jesus Christ, Our Lady of Begoña, Our Lady of Arantzazu, Our Lady of Guadalupe at Hondarribia, and the Christ of Burgos. There also was a letter appealing to the goodwill of the Antwerpers.

William was finally shot dead by the French Catholic Balthasar Gérard on 10 July 1584.
