= 1980 Plesetsk launch pad disaster =

Vostok-2M rocket explosion during refueling

Coordinates: 62°55′43″N 40°27′24″E

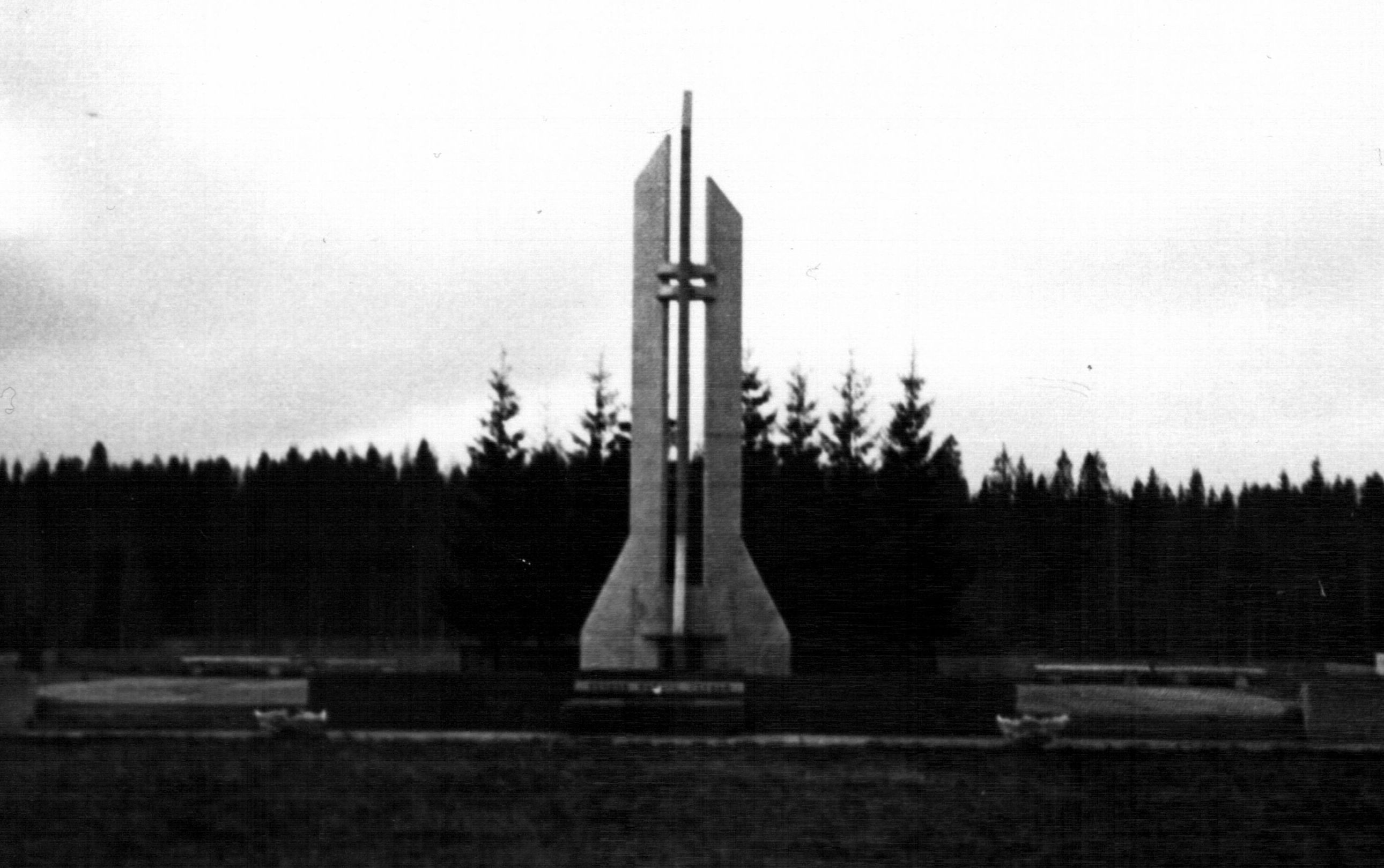
- Memorial to victims of the disaster
- Date: 18 March 1980, 19:01 MSK (16:01 UTC)
- Location: Plesetsk Cosmodrome, Site 43/4
- Deaths: 48 (Note: Initially after the events were declassified the New York Times and several other sources reported 50 deaths instead of 48; after more information about the event became available the death toll was amended to 48.)
- Injuries: 87 (43 seriously)

The 1980 Plesetsk launch pad disaster was the explosion of a Vostok-2M rocket carrying a Tselina-D satellite during fueling at Site 43/4 of the Plesetsk Cosmodrome in the town of Mirny in the Soviet Union at 19:01 local time (16:01 UTC) on 18 March 1980, two hours and fifteen minutes before the intended launch time. Forty-four people were killed in the initial fire and four more soon died in the hospital from burns. It is the third deadliest space exploration-related disaster in history.

== Sequence of events ==
On 17 March the rocket was installed at the launch site. Various preliminary tests conducted before the fueling went as expected and without problem. The Vostok-2M had been flying for 16 years with only a single in-flight failure and this vehicle, S/N 78055-330, would have been the 70th one launched. The launch of the rocket was scheduled to take place at 21:16 on 18 March. Several hours before the intended launch, the tanks were filled with RP-1 at 19:00 and preceded by the addition of liquid oxygen and liquid nitrogen to side tanks. After the addition of hydrogen peroxide was completed, a huge explosion at the site was witnessed at 19:01 MSK; 44 people in the area were killed and another 43 required hospitalization for burns, four of whom later died while in the hospital. Many of the survivors suffered severe burns and lung damage. Over 80% of surviving eyewitnesses to the disaster reported that the first explosion originated from the Block E stage. Fire crept down the side of the rocket and rapidly ignited the core stage and strap-ons. The 300 tons of fuel destroyed the launch pad and surrounding area. The intense heat of the fire caused the metal support structures on LC-43/4 to glow red. The pad was left a twisted mass of rubble. It took a few days to remove all the dead from the pad area during which time small fires continued to burn. LC-43/4 was not used again for four years. Another Vostok-2M vehicle successfully launched a Tselina-D satellite from LC-43/3 on 4 June and completed the mission the 18 March launch was supposed to have done.

== Aftermath ==
=== Initial investigation ===
The official investigation responsible for determining the cause of the disaster headed by Leonid Smirnov assigned blame to the crew that was killed at the site of the fire by specifically stating the official cause as "explosion (inflammation) of material soaked in liquid oxygen as a result of unauthorized actions of one of the members of the ground crew." The investigative committee was under political pressure to blame the launch crews, many of whom were dead and couldn't defend themselves, rather than the workforce at the Khrunichiev plant in Samara where R-7 vehicles were assembled. However, less than a year later, on 23 July 1981 after a second disaster of the same cause was narrowly avoided, it was discovered that a design flaw in the fuel filters of the rocket were likely the cause of the 1980 disaster, although it was impossible to confirm which type of filters were used in the rocket that exploded. The catalytically active lead solder on the filters would cause an explosion upon contact with hydrogen peroxide.

=== Cover-up ===
The disaster was not reported in Soviet media at the time and was not publicly admitted to until the Glasnost era nine years later. Pravda reported that the launch of the rocket was a success and did not say anything about the explosion. It was only in 1999, almost two decades after the disaster, that an investigative committee ruled that the cause of the disaster was "probably" use of lead solder in the fuel filters.
