= List of R-7 launches (1957–1959) =

This is a list of launches made by the R-7 Semyorka ICBM, and its derivatives between 1957 and 1959. All launches are orbital satellite launches, unless stated otherwise.

Date and time (GMT)	Configuration	Serial number	Launch site	Result	Payload	Remarks
== 1957 ==
15 May 1957, 16:01	R-7 Semyorka (8K71)	M1-5	LC-1/5, Baikonur	Failure	N/A	Flight test, maiden flight of R-7. Fire in the Blok D strap-on led to premature separation at T+88 seconds and vehicle breakup.
12 July 1957, 12:53	R-7 Semyorka (8K71)	M1-7	LC-1/5, Baikonur	Failure	N/A	Electrical failure caused the vehicle to roll at high speed, resulting in breakup at T+32 seconds.
21 August 1957, 12:25	R-7 Semyorka (8K71)	M1-8	LC-1/5, Baikonur	Successful	N/A	ICBM test - World's first missile flight to achieve intercontinental range.
7 September 1957, 11:39	R-7 Semyorka (8K71)	M1-9	LC-1/5, Baikonur	Successful	N/A	ICBM test
4 October 1957, 19:28	Sputnik-PS (8K71PS)	M1-1PS	LC-1/5, Baikonur	Successful	Sputnik 1	World's first orbital launch Maiden flight of Sputnik 8K71PS
3 November 1957, 02:30	Sputnik-PS (8K71PS)	M1-2PS	LC-1/5, Baikonur	Successful	Sputnik 2	First animal in orbit (Laika); Final flight of Sputnik 8K71PS
== 1958 ==
29 January 1958, 21:15	R-7 Semyorka (8K71)	M1-11	LC-1/5, Baikonur	Failure	N/A	ICBM test. Improper separation of the strap-ons at staging damaged plumbing in the core stage. Vehicle lost thrust and the warhead impacted far off-target.
29 March 1958, 14:40	R-7 Semyorka (8K71)	M1-10	LC-1/5, Baikonur	Successful	N/A	ICBM test
4 April 1958, 15:30	R-7 Semyorka (8K71)	M1-12	LC-1/5, Baikonur	Successful	N/A	ICBM test
27 April 1958, 09:01	Sputnik (8A91)	B1-2	LC-1/5, Baikonur	Failure	D1 s/n. 1	Longitudinal vibration in strap-ons results in disintegration of the vehicle at T+88 seconds Maiden flight of Sputnik 8A91
15 May 1958, 07:00	Sputnik (8A91)	B1-1	LC-1/5, Baikonur	Successful	Sputnik 3	Final flight of Sputnik rocket
24 May 1958, 10:30	R-7 Semyorka (8K71)	B1-3	LC-1/5, Baikonur	Failure	N/A	Luna 8K72 test with dummy Blok E stage. Blok A shut down prematurely and upper stage separation failed.
10 July 1958, 07:42	R-7 Semyorka (8K71)	B1-4	LC-1/5, Baikonur	Failure	N/A	Luna 8K72 test with dummy Blok E stage. Blok D engine failed at liftoff due to high frequency combustion instability and broke off the stack. The rest of the vehicle flew until T+40 seconds when stability was lost and it crashed 66 km downrange.
23 September 1958, 07:40	Luna (8K72)	B1-3	LC-1/5, Baikonur	Failure	Luna E-1 No.1	Excessive vibration caused the booster to disintegrate 92 seconds into flight Maiden flight of Luna 8K72.
11 October 1958, 21:42	Luna (8K72)	B1-4	LC-1/5, Baikonur	Failure	Luna E-1 No.2	Excessive vibration caused the booster to disintegrate 104 seconds into flight.
4 December 1958, 18:18	Luna (8K72)	B1-5	LC-1/5, Baikonur	Failure	Luna E-1 No.3	Loss of hydrogen peroxide lubricant to the core stage turbopumps at T+245 seconds. Vehicle lost thrust and impacted downrange.
24 December 1958, 16:00	R-7 Semyorka (8K71)	B3-16	LC-1/5, Baikonur	Failure	N/A	ICBM test. Loss of hydrogen peroxide lubricant in the Blok V strap-on, which separated 13 seconds prior to normal cutoff and staging. Manual shutoff command issued at T+130 seconds.
== 1959 ==
2 January 1959, 16:41	Luna (8K72)	B1-6	LC-1/5, Baikonur	Partial failure	Luna 1	Guidance system malfunction First human-made object to reach the escape velocity of the Earth
17 March 1959, 01:46	R-7 Semyorka (8K71)	041081	LC-1/5, Baikonur	Successful	N/A	ICBM test
25 March 1959, 05:25	R-7 Semyorka (8K71)	I3-18	LC-1/5, Baikonur	Successful	N/A	ICBM test
30 March 1959, 22:53	R-7 Semyorka (8K71)	I3-20	LC-1/5, Baikonur	Failure	N/A	ICBM test. Loss of hydrogen peroxide lubricant at T+280 seconds. Core stage lost thrust.
9 May 1959, 18:59	R-7 Semyorka (8K71)	I3-21	LC-1/5, Baikonur	Successful	N/A	ICBM test
30 May 1959, 21:42	R-7 Semyorka (8K71)	I3-22	LC-1/5, Baikonur	Failure	N/A	ICBM test. Partial failure. Core stage engines failed to shut off on schedule and the warhead overshot its target by 1890 km.
9 June 1959, 20:34	R-7 Semyorka (8K71)	I3-23	LC-1/5, Baikonur	Failure	N/A	ICBM test, missed target
18 June 1959, 08:08	Luna (8K72)	I1-7	LC-1/5, Baikonur	Failure	Luna E-1A No.1	Spilled gyroscope led to control failure at T+153 seconds.
18 July 1959, 18:15	R-7 Semyorka (8K71)	I3-24	LC-1/5, Baikonur	Successful	N/A	ICBM test
30 July 1959, 04:00	R-7 Semyorka (8K71)	041082	LC-1/5, Baikonur	Successful	N/A	ICBM test
13 August 1959, 23:14	R-7 Semyorka (8K71)	I3-25	LC-1/5, Baikonur	Successful	N/A	ICBM test
12 September 1959, 06:39	Luna (8K72)	I1-7B	LC-1/5, Baikonur	Successful	Luna 2	
18 September 1959, 16:02	R-7 Semyorka (8K71)	I1-1T	LC-1/5, Baikonur	Successful	N/A	ICBM test
4 October 1959, 00:43	Luna (8K72)	I1-8	LC-1/5, Baikonur	Successful	Luna 3	
22 October 1959, 17:30	R-7 Semyorka (8K71)	267432	LC-1/5, Baikonur	Successful	N/A	ICBM test
25 October 1959, 17:32	R-7 Semyorka (8K71)	267434	LC-1/5, Baikonur	Successful	N/A	ICBM test
1 November 1959, 21:23	R-7 Semyorka (8K71)	267431	LC-1/5, Baikonur	Successful	N/A	ICBM test
20 November 1959, 21:06	R-7 Semyorka (8K71)	I2-1T	LC-1/5, Baikonur	Successful	N/A	ICBM test
27 November 1959, 01:12	R-7 Semyorka (8K71)	267433	LC-1/5, Baikonur	Successful	N/A	ICBM test
23 December 1959, 19:05	R-7A Semyorka (8K74)	I1-1	LC-1/5, Baikonur	Failure	N/A	ICBM test, Maiden flight of R-7A, Thrust vectoring failed
