= List of R-7 launches (1960–1964) =

This is a list of launches made by the R-7 Semyorka ICBM, and its derivatives between 1960 and 1964. All launches are orbital satellite launches, unless stated otherwise.

| Date and time (GMT) | Configuration | Serial number | Launch site | Result | Payload | Remarks |
|---|---|---|---|---|---|---|
== 1960 ==
| 20 January 1960, 16:35 | R-7A Semyorka (8K74) | I1-2 | LC-1/5, Baikonur | Successful | N/A | ICBM test Battleship Blok I stage |
| 24 January 1960, 16:15 | R-7A Semyorka (8K74) | I1-3 | LC-1/5, Baikonur | Failure | N/A | ICBM test. Blok B vernier exploded due to improper preflight procedure. Strap-on broke off the stack and the missile disintegrated T+31 seconds. |
| 31 January 1960, 16:17 | R-7A Semyorka (8K74) | I1-2 | LC-1/5, Baikonur | Successful | N/A | ICBM test Battleship Blok I stage |
| 17 March 1960, 23:55 | R-7A Semyorka (8K74) | I1-5 | LC-1/5, Baikonur | Successful | N/A | ICBM test |
| 24 March 1960, 02:06 | R-7A Semyorka (8K74) | L1-5 | LC-1/5, Baikonur | Successful | N/A | ICBM test |
| 15 April 1960, 15:06 | Luna (8K72) | I1-9 | LC-1/5, Baikonur | Failure | Luna E-3 No.1 | Blok E cut off two seconds early due to ground crews forgetting to fill the RP-1 tank completely. |
| 16 April 1960, 16:07 | Luna (8K72) | L1-9A | LC-1/5, Baikonur | Failure | Luna E-3 No.2 | Blok B strap-on developed insufficient thrust and tore away from the booster at liftoff. The vehicle disintegrated. |
| 15 May 1960, 00:00 | Vostok-L (8K72L) | L1-11 | LC-1/5, Baikonur | Successful | Korabl-Sputnik 1 (Vostok) | Maiden flight of Vostok-L 8K72L. Spacecraft not recovered due to reentry malfunction. |
| 4 June 1960, 15:49 | R-7 Semyorka (8K71) | L1-9 | LC-1/5, Baikonur | Successful | N/A | ICBM test |
| 5 July 1960, 15:56 | R-7A Semyorka (8K74) | I1-6 | LC-1/5, Baikonur | Successful | N/A | ICBM test |
| 7 July 1960, 16:15 | R-7A Semyorka (8K74) | I1-7 | LC-1/5, Baikonur | Successful | N/A | ICBM test |
| 28 July 1960, 09:31 | Vostok-L (8K72L) | L1-10 | LC-1/5, Baikonur | Failure | Korabl-Sputnik (Vostok) | Combustion instability caused engine failure and explosion in the Blok G strap-on T+23 seconds. The launcher disintegrated at T+38 seconds. |
| 19 August 1960, 08:44 | Vostok-L (8K72L) | L1-12 | LC-1/5, Baikonur | Successful | Korabl-Sputnik 2 (Vostok) | |
| 10 October 1960, 14:27 | Molniya (8K78) | L1-4M | LC-1/5, Baikonur | Failure | Mars 1M No.1 | Blok I pitch control failure T+309 seconds. Automatic shutdown commanded T+325 seconds Maiden flight of Molniya 8K78 |
| 14 October 1960, 13:51 | Molniya (8K78) | L1-5M | LC-1/5, Baikonur | Failure | Mars 1M No.2 | Blok I failed to start due to a frozen RP-1 duct |
| 1 December 1960, 07:30 | Vostok-L (8K72L) | L1-13 | LC-1/5, Baikonur | Successful | Korabl-Sputnik 3 (Vostok) | Improper reentry resulted in spacecraft destruction |
| 22 December 1960, 07:45 | Vostok-K (8K72K) | L1-13A | LC-1/5, Baikonur | Failure | Korabl-Sputnik (Vostok) | Blok E gas generator failure T+422 seconds Maiden flight of Vostok-K 8K72K |
== 1961 ==
| 14 January 1961, 16:15 | R-7A Semyorka (8K74) | | LC-31/6, Baikonur | Successful | N/A | ICBM test, First launch from LC-31 |
| 4 February 1961, 01:18 | Molniya (8K78) | L1-7 | LC-1/5, Baikonur | Failure | Tyazhely Sputnik (Venera) | Venus probe Blok L could not be started due to a power failure |
| 12 February 1961, 00:34 | Molniya (8K78) | L1-6 | LC-1/5, Baikonur | Successful | Venera 1 | First successful Venus mission |
| 13 February 1961, 04:39 | R-7A Semyorka (8K74) | I1-3T | LC-31/6, Baikonur | Successful | N/A | ICBM test |
| 27 February 1961, 00:52 | R-7 Semyorka (8K71) | L2-1 | LC-31/6, Baikonur | Successful | N/A | ICBM test Final flight of R-7 Semyorka 8K71. |
| 9 March 1961, 06:29 | Vostok-K (8K72K) | E103-14 | LC-1/5, Baikonur | Successful | Korabl-Sputnik 4 (Vostok) | |
| 25 March 1961, 05:54 | Vostok-K (8K72K) | E103-15 | LC-1/5, Baikonur | Successful | Korabl-Sputnik 5 (Vostok) | |
| 12 April 1961, 06:07 | Vostok-K (8K72K) | E103-16 | LC-1/5, Baikonur | Successful | Vostok 1 | First crewed spaceflight, 1 cosmonaut, Yuri Gagarin |
| 14 April 1961, 19:24 | R-7A Semyorka (8K74) | | LC-31/6, Baikonur | Failure | N/A | ICBM test. Core stage lost thrust due to steam generator failure. Warhead landed 2,380 km downrange. |
| 15 June 1961, 05:45 | R-7A Semyorka (8K74) | E15001-06 | LC-31/6, Baikonur | Successful | N/A | ICBM test |
| 4 July 1961, 04:00 | R-7A Semyorka (8K74) | I2-4 | LC-31/6, Baikonur | Successful | N/A | ICBM test |
| 4 July 1961, 20:20 | R-7A Semyorka (8K74) | I2-2 | LC-31/6, Baikonur | Successful | N/A | ICBM test |
| 6 August 1961, 06:00 | Vostok-K (8K72K) | E103-17 | LC-1/5, Baikonur | Successful | Vostok 2 | Crewed orbital flight, 1 cosmonaut, Gherman Titov |
| 21 September 1961, 16:30 | R-7A Semyorka (8K74) | E15003-03 | LC-31/6, Baikonur | Successful | N/A | ICBM test |
| 29 November 1961, 08:15 | R-7A Semyorka (8K74) | | LC-31/6, Baikonur | Successful | N/A | ICBM test |
| 11 December 1961, 09:39 | Vostok-K (8K72K) | E103-21 | LC-1/5, Baikonur | Failure | Zenit-2 | Blok E lost thrust T+399 seconds due to damaged plumbing. Spacecraft intentionally blown up by self-destruct system. |
== 1962 ==
| 26 April 1962, 10:02 | Vostok-K (8K72K) | E103-20 | LC-1/5, Baikonur | Successful | Kosmos 4 (Zenit-2) | |
| 1 June 1962, 09:38 | Vostok-2 (8A92) | E15000-01 | LC-1/5, Baikonur | Failure | Zenit-2 | First use of Vostok-2 8A92. Blok D strap-on shut down at liftoff due to malfunction of an electrical cutoff switch. The launch vehicle crashed near the pad. |
| 2 June 1962, 16:36 | R-7A Semyorka (8K74) | | LC-31/6, Baikonur | Successful | N/A | ICBM test |
| 28 July 1962, 09:18 | Vostok-2 (8A92) | T15000-07 | LC-1/5, Baikonur | Successful | Kosmos 7 (Zenit-2) | |
| 11 August 1962, 08:30 | Vostok-K (8K72K) | E103-23 | LC-1/5, Baikonur | Successful | Vostok 3 | Crewed orbital flight, 1 cosmonaut, Andrian Nikolayev |
| 12 August 1962, 08:02 | Vostok-K (8K72K) | E103-22 | LC-1/5, Baikonur | Successful | Vostok 4 | Crewed orbital flight, 1 cosmonaut, Pavel Popovich |
| 25 August 1962, 02:56 | Molniya (8K78) | T103-12 | LC-1/5, Baikonur | Failure | Venera 2MV-1 No.1 (Venera) | One of the Blok L ullage motors failed to ignited, causing the stage to tumble. The main engine then cut off 45 seconds later, leaving the spacecraft stranded in Earth orbit. |
| 1 September 1962, 02:12 | Molniya (8K78) | T103-13 | LC-1/5, Baikonur | Failure | Venera 2MV-1 No.2 (Venera) | Blok L failed to ignite due to a stuck fuel valve. |
| 12 September 1962, 00:59 | Molniya (8K78) | T103-14 | LC-1/5, Baikonur | Failure | Venera 2MV-2 No.1 (Venera) | Following cutoff of the Blok I stage, one of the oxidizer valves failed to close, allowing LOX to flow into the combustion chamber of one of the vernier thrusters. The thruster then exploded, causing the rocket to tumble out of control. Resultant cavitation in the upper stage turbopump caused the upper stage engine to fail less than a second after ignition. |
| 27 September 1962, 09:40 | Vostok-2 (8A92) | T15000-06 | LC-1/5, Baikonur | Successful | Kosmos 9 (Zenit-2) | |
| 17 October 1962, 09:21 | Vostok-2 (8A92) | E15000-03 | LC-1/5, Baikonur | Successful | Kosmos 10 (Zenit-2) | |
| 24 October 1962, 17:55 | Molniya (8K78) | T103-15 | LC-1/5, Baikonur | Failure | Mars 2MV-4 No.1 (Mars) | Blok L engine disintegrated after 16 seconds of burn time due to loss of turbopump lubricant. |
| 1 November 1962, 16:14 | Molniya (8K78) | T103-16 | LC-1/5, Baikonur | Successful | Mars 1 | Spacecraft later failed due to loss of signal. No data returned during Mars fly-by |
| 4 November 1962, 15:35 | Molniya (8K78) | T103-17 | LC-1/5, Baikonur | Failure | Mars 2MV-3 No.1 (Mars) | Strong vibration during the Blok I burn caused by fuel pump cavitation loosened the igniter in the Blok L engine, preventing it from being started. |
| 22 December 1962, 09:24 | Vostok-2 (8A92) | T15000-10 | LC-1/5, Baikonur | Successful | Kosmos 12 (Zenit-2) | |
== 1963 ==
| 4 January 1963, 07:49 | Molniya (8K78) | T103-09 | LC-1/5, Baikonur | Failure | Luna E-6 No.2 (Luna) | Blok L failed to start as the ignition command was never received due to possible contamination of the probe's control system |
| 3 February 1963, 09:29 | Molniya (8K78) | T103-10 | LC-1/5, Baikonur | Failure | Luna E-6 No.3 | Blok I pitch control failed T+295 seconds due to improper gyroscope alignment |
| 21 March 1963, 08:24 | Vostok-2 (8A92) | T15001-01 | LC-1/5, Baikonur | Successful | Kosmos 13 (Zenit-2) | |
| 2 April 1963, 08:16 | Molniya (8K78) | T103-11 | LC-1/5, Baikonur | Successful | Luna 4 | Spacecraft later failed to land on Moon |
| 22 April 1963, 08:24 | Vostok-2 (8A92) | T15000-08 | LC-1/5, Baikonur | Successful | Kosmos 15 (Zenit-2) | |
| 22 April 1963, 12:32 | R-7A Semyorka (8K74) | | LC-31/6, Baikonur | Successful | N/A | ICBM test |
| 28 April 1963, 08:50 | Vostok-2 (8A92) | E15000-02 | LC-1/5, Baikonur | Successful | Kosmos 16 (Zenit-2) | |
| 18 May 1963, 07:41 | R-7A Semyorka (8K74) | | LC-31/6, Baikonur | Successful | N/A | ICBM test |
| 24 May 1963, 10:34 | Vostok-2 (8A92) | E15000-12 | LC-1/5, Baikonur | Successful | Kosmos 18 (Zenit-2) | |
| 14 June 1963, 11:59 | Vostok-K (8K72K) | E103-24 | LC-1/5, Baikonur | Successful | Vostok 5 | Crewed orbital flight, 1 cosmonaut, Valery Bykovsky |
| 16 June 1963, 09:29 | Vostok-K (8K72K) | E103-25 | LC-1/5, Baikonur | Successful | Vostok 6 | Crewed orbital flight, 1 cosmonaut, Valentina Tereshkova; First woman in space |
| 10 July 1963 | Vostok-2 (8A92) | E15000-04 | LC-1/5, Baikonur | Failure | Zenit-2 | Blok B strap-on shut down at liftoff due to hydrogen peroxide pump malfunction. Vehicle crashed near the pad. |
| 14 October 1963, 13:56 | R-7A Semyorka (8K74) | | LC-31/6, Baikonur | Successful | N/A | ICBM test |
| 18 October 1963, 09:30 | Vostok-2 (8A92) | G15001-01 | LC-1/5, Baikonur | Successful | Kosmos 20 (Zenit-2) | |
| 1 November 1963, 08:56 | Polyot (11A59) | E15003-02A | LC-31/6, Baikonur | Successful | Polyot 1 | Maiden flight of Polyot 11A59 |
| 11 November 1963, 06:23 | Molniya (8K78) | G15000-17 | LC-1/5, Baikonur | Failure | Kosmos 21 (Venera) | Improper separation of the Blok I and L resulted in the latter tumbling and shutting down after only 13 seconds of burn time. |
| 16 November 1963, 10:34 | Voskhod (11A57) | G15000-06 | LC-1/5, Baikonur | Successful | Kosmos 22 (Zenit-4) | Maiden flight of Voskhod 11A57 |
| 28 November 1963, 09:20 | Vostok-2 (8A92) | G15001-02 | LC-1/5, Baikonur | Failure | Zenit-2 | Blok E lost thrust T+483 seconds |
| 19 December 1963, 09:29 | Vostok-2 (8A92) | G15001-03 | LC-1/5, Baikonur | Successful | Kosmos 24 (Zenit-2) | |
== 1964 ==
| 30 January 1964, 09:45 | Vostok-K (8K72K) | G103-18 | LC-1/5, Baikonur | Successful | Elektron-1 | |
| 30 January 1964, 09:45 | Vostok-K (8K72K) | G103-18 | LC-1/5, Baikonur | Successful | Elektron-2 | |
| 19 February 1964, 05:37 | Molniya (8K78) | T15000-26 | LC-1/5, Baikonur | Failure | Zond 3MV-1 No.2 | Blok I failed to start due to a frozen RP-1 line |
| 21 March 1964, 08:14 | Molniya (8K78) | T15000-20 | LC-1/5, Baikonur | Failure | Luna E-6 No.6 | Stuck engine valve in the Blok I stage caused low thrust and premature shutdown at T+489 seconds. |
| 27 March 1964, 03:24 | Molniya (8K78) | G15000-27 | LC-1/5, Baikonur | Failure | Kosmos 27 (Venera) | Control system malfunction causes loss of Blok L stability and engine shutdown |
| 2 April 1964, 02:42 | Molniya (8K78) | G15000-28 | LC-1/5, Baikonur | Successful | Zond 1 | |
| 4 April 1964, 09:45 | Vostok-2 (8A92) | G15001-04 | LC-31/6, Baikonur | Successful | Kosmos 28 (Zenit-2) | |
| 12 April 1964, 09:31 | Polyot (11A59) | T15001-04A | LC-1/5, Baikonur | Successful | Polyot-2 | Final flight of Polyot 11A59 |
| 20 April 1964, 08:08 | Molniya (8K78) | T15000-21 | LC-1/5, Baikonur | Failure | Luna E-6 No.5 | Launch vehicle control system power loss caused premature engine shutdown T+340 seconds |
| 25 April 1964, 10:21 | Vostok-2 (8A92) | R15001-01 | LC-31/6, Baikonur | Successful | Kosmos 29 (Zenit-2) | |
| 18 May 1964, 09:42 | Voskhod (11A57) | G15000-12 | LC-1/5, Baikonur | Successful | Kosmos 30 (Zenit-4) | |
| 3 June 1964, 06:04 | R-7A Semyorka (8K74) | | LC-31/6, Baikonur | Successful | N/A | ICBM test |
| 4 June 1964, 04:00 | Molniya (8K78) | G103-18 | LC-1/5, Baikonur | Failure | Molniya-1 | Blok A propellant utilization malfunction results in excessive RP-1 consumption and premature shutdown T+287 seconds Also identified as Zond 1964A, a failed Lunar flyby |
| 10 June 1964, 10:48 | Vostok-2 (8A92) | R15001-02 | LC-31/6, Baikonur | Successful | Kosmos 32 (Zenit-2) | |
| 23 June 1964, 10:19 | Vostok-2 (8A92) | G15001-05 | LC-31/6, Baikonur | Successful | Kosmos 33 (Zenit-2) | |
| 1 July 1964, 11:16 | Voskhod (11A57) | T15000-04 | LC-1/5, Baikonur | Successful | Kosmos 34 (Zenit-4) | |
| 10 July 1964, 21:51 | Vostok-K (8K72K) | G103-19 | LC-1/5, Baikonur | Successful | Elektron-3 | Final flight of Vostok-K 8K72K |
| 10 July 1964, 21:51 | Vostok-K (8K72K) | G103-19 | LC-1/5, Baikonur | Successful | Elektron-4 | Final flight of Vostok-K 8K72K |
| 15 July 1964, 11:27 | Vostok-2 (8A92) | R15001-03 | LC-31/6, Baikonur | Successful | Kosmos 35 (Zenit-2) | |
| 27 July 1964, 14:00 | R-7A Semyorka (8K74) | | LC-31/6, Baikonur | Successful | N/A | ICBM test |
| 14 August 1964, 09:36 | Vostok-2 (8A92) | R15001-04 | LC-31/6, Baikonur | Successful | Kosmos 37 (Zenit-2) | |
| 22 August 1964, 07:21 | Molniya (8K78) | G103-19 | LC-1/5, Baikonur | Successful | Kosmos 41 (Molniya-1) | |
| 28 August 1964, 16:19 | Vostok-2M (8A92M) | T15000-05 | LC-31/6, Baikonur | Successful | Kosmos 44 (Meteor) | Maiden flight of Vostok-2M 8A92M |
| 13 September 1964, 09:45 | Voskhod (11A57) | R15001-01 | LC-1/5, Baikonur | Successful | Kosmos 45 (Zenit-4) | |
| 24 September 1964, 12:04 | Vostok-2 (8A92) | R15001-05 | LC-31/6, Baikonur | Successful | Kosmos 46 (Zenit-2) | |
| 6 October 1964, 07:12 | Voskhod (11A57) | R15000-02 | LC-1/5, Baikonur | Successful | Kosmos 47 (Voskhod) | |
| 12 October 1964, 07:30 | Voskhod (11A57) | R15000-04 | LC-1/5, Baikonur | Successful | Voskhod 1 | Crewed orbital flight, 3 cosmonauts First multi-person spaceflight |
| 14 October 1964, 09:50 | Vostok-2 (8A92) | R15002-01 | LC-31/6, Baikonur | Successful | Kosmos 48 (Zenit-2) | |
| 28 October 1964, 10:48 | Vostok-2 (8A92) | R15002-02 | LC-31/6, Baikonur | Successful | Kosmos 50 (Zenit-2) | |
| 30 November 1964, 13:25 | Molniya (8K78) | G15000-29 | LC-1/5, Baikonur | Successful | Zond 2 | |
