= RD-0109 =

Rocket engine

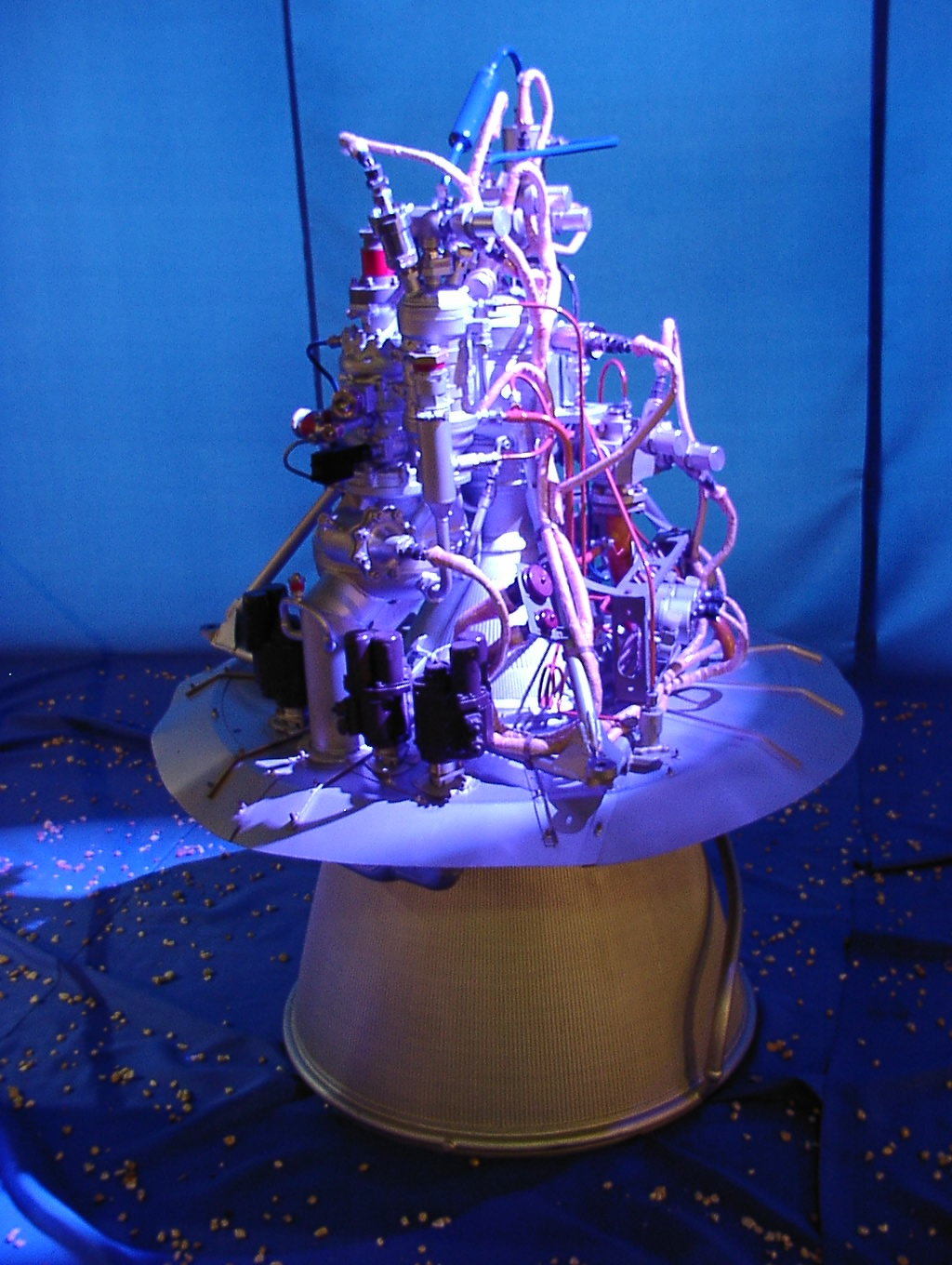
- Country of origin: Soviet Union
- First flight: 1960-12-22
- Last flight: 1991-08-29
- Designer: OKB-154, S.A. Kosberg
- Manufacturer: Voronezh Mechanical Plant
- Application: Upper Stage
- Associated LV: Vostok
- Predecessor: RD-0105
- Successor: RD-0108
- Status: Retired

Liquid-fuel engine
- Propellant: LOX / RG-1
- Cycle: Gas Generator

Configuration
- Chamber: 1

Performance
- Thrust, vacuum: 54.5 kilonewtons (12,300 lbf)
- Chamber pressure: 5 megapascals (730 psi)
- Specific impulse, vacuum: 323.5 seconds
- Burn time: 430s

Dimensions
- Length: 1,555 millimetres (61.2 in)
- Diameter: 733 millimetres (28.9 in)
- Dry mass: 121 kilograms (267 lb)

Used in
- Vostok Block-E

RD-0105
- Country of origin: USSR
- First flight: 1959-01-02
- Last flight: 1960-12-01
- Designer: OKB-154, S.A. Kosberg
- Manufacturer: Voronezh Mechanical Plant
- Application: Upper Stage
- Associated LV: Vostok 8K72
- Successor: RD-0109
- Status: Retired

Liquid-fuel engine
- Propellant: LOX / RG-1
- Cycle: Gas Generator

Configuration
- Chamber: 1

Performance
- Thrust, vacuum: 49.4 kilonewtons (11,100 lbf)
- Chamber pressure: 4.5 megapascals (650 psi)
- Specific impulse, vacuum: 316 seconds
- Burn time: 454s

Dimensions
- Length: 494 millimetres (19.4 in)
- Diameter: 733 millimetres (28.9 in)
- Dry mass: 130 kilograms (290 lb)

Used in
- Vostok Block-E

The RD-0109 is a rocket engine burning liquid oxygen and kerosene in a gas generator combustion cycle. It has single nozzle and is an evolution of the RD-0105. It was the engine used on the Vostok Block-E that launched Yuri Gagarin to orbit.

== Development ==
After the success of Sputnik 1, Korolev sent series of letters to the Central Committee of the Communist Party of the Soviet Union proposing a bold plan to send robotic spacecraft to Mars and Venus. As part of such plan, a fourth stage was needed to enhance the three stage R-7 rocket and enable it to send useful payloads to those high energy destinations. This fourth stage was called Block-E, and its development started during 1958.

Korolev's OKB-1 design bureau initially competed two projects for the Block-E propulsion: 8K72, using the S.A. Kosberg's OKB-154 RD-0105, and the 8K73, using Glushko's OKB-456 RD-109 engine. Due to the complication of developing that latter, Kosberg got the contract.

Since the February 20, 1958 order of development, it took nine months to develop the engine. It was done by using RD-0102 assemblies and combustion chamber. Fifty eight static tests were conducted with 27 engines.

Between 1959 and 1960 the engine was modified to improve reliability for crewed flight. Thrust was also increased 2%, thanks to improved injection elements. It also introduced an innovation attributed to S.A. Kosbergs in its construction, that has been a staple of Soviet (and later Russian) engines. It used a corrugated metal construction for the cooling jackets, with the lower section of the nozzle lacking an external liner, to save weight. This led to a 9.3% weight reduction even with the increased thrust. This new version was christened as the RD-0109 and entered service on the December 22, 1960, launch of a (Vostok) spacecraft aboard a Vostok-K 8K72K.

The RD-0109 is the basis for the Brazilian Space Agency L75 engine project.

== History ==
While the first launches for Sputnik 1 satellites could be done with the two stage booster Sputnik, to achieve escape velocity required by the Luna programme, a third stage was needed. The task of developing the specified engine was entrusted to OKB-154 (KBKhA), which did the job in 9 months. The engine received intra name RO-5.

The first flight of a Luna 8K72, which included the new Block-E stage propelled by the RD-0105 was on September 23, 1958. It was supposed to launch the Luna E-1 No.1 probe, but ended 92 seconds after launch when the rocket broke up from longitudinal vibration, causing the strap-ons to separate from the vehicle, which then crashed downrange. Neither was successful the second flight of a Luna 8K72 (October 11, 1958), which was to launch the Luna E-1 No.2 probe and ended 104 seconds after launch when the rocket again disintegrated from vibration. The third flight of a Luna 8K72 (December 4, 1958), which was to launch the Luna E-1 No.3 probe, also ended 245 seconds after launch when the Block-I core stage shut down from loss of engine lubricant.

On January 2, 1959, as part of the Luna 8K72's Block-E stage, the engine RD-0105 finally performed its first successful mission, the launch of Luna 1. It was also the first deep space engine ignition, the first spacecraft to reach escape velocity and, while the spacecraft missed the Moon with which it was supposed to crash, it became the first human made object to enter a heliocentric orbit.

On September 14, 1959, the RD-0105 propelled Luna 2 towards the Moon. It was the first spacecraft to reach the surface of the Moon, and the first man-made object to land on another celestial body. It took with it a pennant with the State Emblem of the USSR.

On August 19, 1960, the RD-0105 propelled Korabl-Sputnik 2 mission. It was the third Vostok spacecraft and the first spaceflight to send animals into orbit and return them safely back to Earth.

On December 22, 1960, the RD-0109 had its first flight on a Vostok-K Block-E. Regrettably, the gas generator of the rocket third stage suffered a failure and the RD-0109 could not prove itself in flight. That chance came with the second Vostok-K launch, where the RD-0109 successfully launched the Korabl-Sputnik 4 mission to orbit.

On April 12, 1961, the RD-0109, as part of the Block-E stage of the Vostok-K 8K72K rocket, propelled the historic Vostok 1 to orbit making Yuri Gagarin the first human to go to outer space and the first to orbit the Earth.

On June 16, 1963, the RD-0109 propelled the Vostok 6 making Valentina V. Tereshkova the first woman to orbit Earth.

== Versions ==
Improvement and modifications required to comply with the man rating of the RD-0105 led it to have two versions:

- RD-0105 (GRAU Index: 8D714), also known as RD-448 or RO-05. Was the first version but had some reliability issues. Used on the Luna and Vostok-L 8K72 rockets.
- RD-0109 (GRAU Index: 8D719). Improved and more reliable version which was used on the rest of the Vostok family.

== See also ==
- Luna - The first launch vehicle that used the RD-0105 and the first to send object beyond Earth orbit.
- Vostok - The launch vehicle that enabled Yuri Gagarin to be the first human to orbit Earth.
- KBKhA - The RD-0105/RD-0109 design bureau.
- Voronezh Mechanical Plant - A space hardware manufacturer company that manufactured the RD-0109.
