= Luna 4 =

Space probe

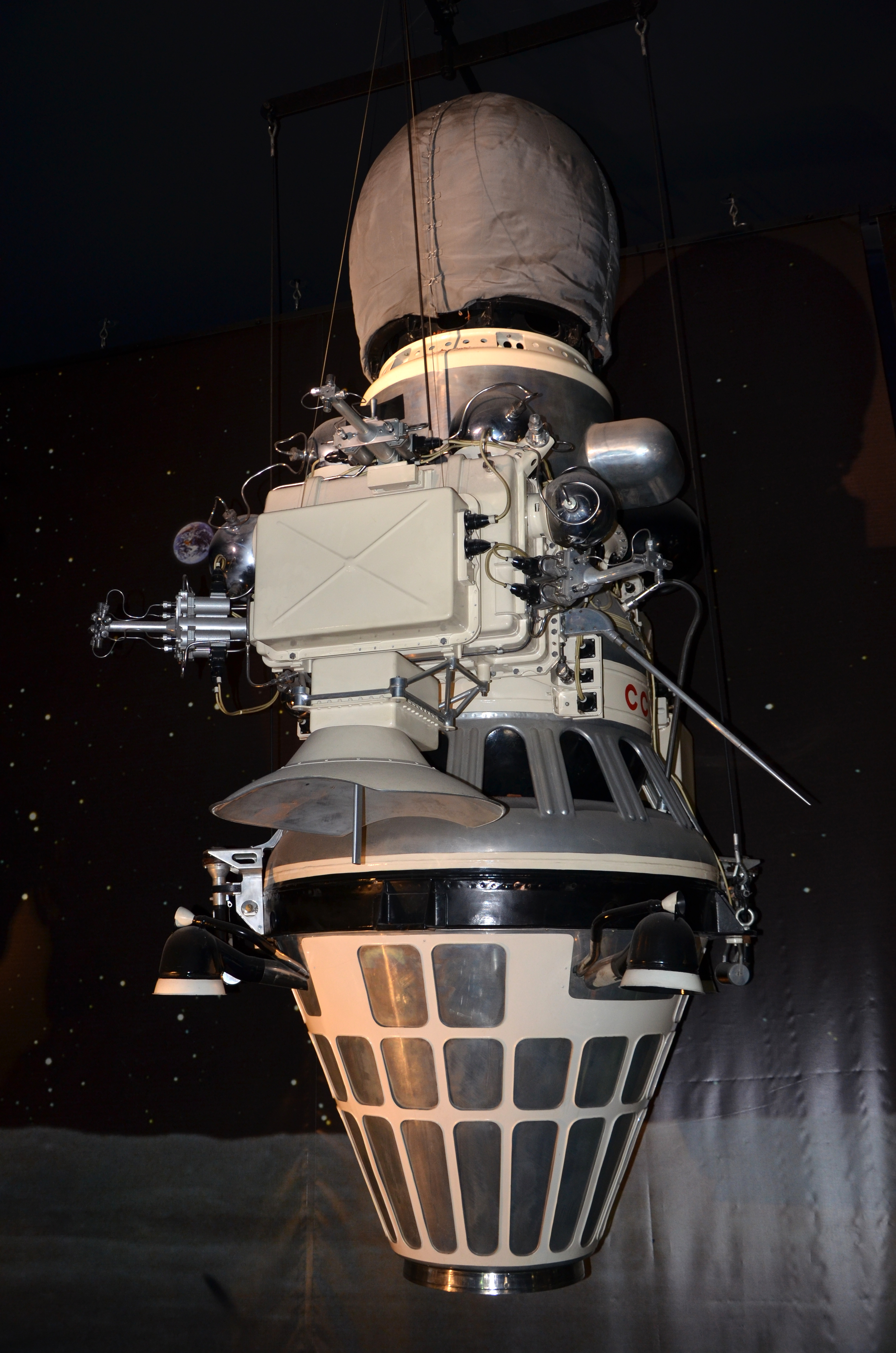
- Mockup of the Luna 9 (a Ye-6 series), Museum of Air and Space Paris, Le Bourget (France)
- Mission type: Lunar lander
- Operator: Soviet space program
- COSPAR ID: 1963-008B
- SATCAT no.: 566
- Mission duration: 13 days (launch to last contact)

Spacecraft properties
- Spacecraft: Ye-6 No.4
- Manufacturer: OKB-1
- Launch mass: 1,422 kilograms (3,135 lb)

Start of mission
- Launch date: April 2, 1963, 08:04:00 UTC
- Rocket: Molniya-L 8K78/E6
- Launch site: Baikonur 1/5

End of mission
- Last contact: April 15, 1963

Orbital parameters
- Periapsis altitude: 690,000 km (430,000 mi)
- Apoapsis altitude: 89,250 km (55,460 mi)
- Epoch: April 2, 1963

Lunar flyby (failed landing)
- Closest approach: April 5, 1963, 13:25 UT
- Distance: 8,400 kilometres (5,200 mi)

Luna 4, or E-6 No.4 (Ye-6 series), sometimes known in the West as Lunik 4, was a Soviet spacecraft launched in 1963 as part of the Luna program to attempt the first soft landing on the Moon. Following a successful launch, the spacecraft failed to perform a course correction and as a result it missed the Moon, remaining instead in Earth orbit before possibly transitioning into a solar orbit. Though the mission was unsuccessful, it nevertheless marked a new epoch in the Space Race, which culminated in the successful landing of Luna 9 in 1966.

== Background ==
On the heels of the successful Luna 3 mission, which returned the first images of the Far Side of the Moon, the Soviet Union turned its attention to learning more about the lunar surface and whether it was solid enough to land and build structures upon. To this end, on 10 December 1959, Soviet Premier Nikita Khrushchev signed a resolution of the Central Committee and Council of Ministers for the creation of a lunar soft lander equipped with scientific instrumentation and a television. This task was assigned to a group led by Nikolay Beresnev, working in the section of Mikhail Tikhonravov's department at OKB-1 run by Gleb Maksimov. OKB-1 chief Sergei Korolev took a personal hand in leading the project initially before handing the reins to Beresnev. By 1963, de facto management of the project had devolved onto Boris Chertok. The working designation was Ye-6 ("Ye" being the letter in the alphabet succeeding "D", the designation given to the satellite project that became Sputnik 3).

Because of the complexity of the Ye-6 spacecraft, its mass was too great for the three-stage Luna (rocket) that had launched the previous Luna probes. The Ye-6 instead would be launched on the 8K78 booster which allowed a larger payload and provided the ability to put the probe in a parking orbit rather than the inaccurate direct ascent of the first generation Luna probes, although of the first ten 8K78 launch attempts, only two (Mars 1 and Venera 1) succeeded, the rest failing to reach orbit or being unable to leave LEO. Combined with the advanced nature of the lander, the Ye-6 team estimated that the mission had a 10% chance of success.

== Spacecraft ==
The Ye-6 spacecraft consisted of a stack of three cylindrical modules, with a height of 2.7 m (8 ft 10 in) and a launch mass of 1,422 kg (3,135 lb). The first module was the Isayev rocket module, which held the main engine, used for mid-course correction and the descent to landing, four thrusters for attitude control, and two cruise modules. The main engine propellant was hypergolic, consisting of nitric acid and amine and producing a thrust of about 45,000 N. The four thrusters were mounted on outriggers and could produce 245 N each. A 5 m (16 ft) boom would be deployed from the bottom of the spacecraft, used to trigger the final landing sequence. The second module was a hermetically sealed pressurized compartment that held the propellant and oxygen and contained communication, attitude orientation, an altimeter, and the onboard control system ("I-100").

Luna 4 carried an astronavigation system so that it could autonomously change course midflight. This device (SAN) was derived from similar systems developed for aircraft. The spacecraft's autonomous control system, gyroscopes, control and logic circuits were all combined in the 80 kg (180 lb) I-100 package that also controlled aspects of the Molniya rocket's third and fourth stages; this was a weight-saving measure that, nevertheless, was conducive to failures, as had occurred when similar solutions had been applied to the Mars and Venera spacecraft.

The third module was the lunar lander, a 58 cm (23 in) diameter sphere protected by two hemispherical airbags. The 105 kg (231 lb) sphere had a hermetically sealed compartment that held communications apparatus, batteries, thermal control systems, a timer, and the science experiments. The top of the sphere had four petals, which would open up on landing, allowing deployment of four 75 cm (30 in) whip antennas and the lander camera turret. Control of the lander was done by the timing device onboard or by communication from Earth. The batteries were designed to operate for a total of 5 hours over about 4 days.

The scientific payload comprised an imaging system and an SBM-10 radiation detector. The latter was a gas-discharge counter, 50 mm (2.0 in) long and 10 mm (0.39 in) in diameter, heavily shielded on one side. Radiation counts were telemetered continuously with a statistical accuracy of about 0.1%.

The mission plan was to initialize the landing sequence at an altitude of about 8,300 km (5,200 mi). At 70 km (43 mi) to 75 km (47 mi) altitude the cruise modules would be jettisoned, the main engine would start, the radar altimeter would be activated, and the lander airbags would inflate. At 250 m (820 ft) to 265 m (869 ft) altitude the main engine would shut off and the four thrusters would ignite. The 5 m (16 ft) meter boom would touch the surface first, causing the ejection of the lander, which would hit the surface, cushioned by the airbags, at about 15 m/s (49 ft/s). The airbags would deflate, the petals would open, causing the sphere to be oriented correctly, and the antennas and instruments could be deployed.

== Mission ==
After a development process fraught with technical and jurisdictional delays, the first flight version of the Ye-6 was built in December 1962. Launches on 4 January 1963 (Luna E-6 No.2) and 3 February 1963 (Luna E-6 No.3) failed—one was stuck in LEO and another failed to reach orbit.

Luna 4 was launched by a Molniya-L carrier rocket at 08:16:37 UTC on April 2, 1963. Launch occurred from Site 1/5 at the Baikonur Cosmodrome, and the mission was tracked and controlled from Simferopol, including the 32 metres (105 ft) parabolic antenna sited there. After reaching an initial parking orbit of 167 by 182 kilometres (104 by 113 mi), the rocket's upper stage restarted to place Luna 4 onto a translunar trajectory.

Luna 4's initial trajectory was according to plan, but due to a failure of the Yupiter astronavigation system, most likely due to thermal control problems, the spacecraft could not be oriented properly for the planned midcourse correction burn. As a result, Luna 4 missed the Moon by about 8,400 kilometres (5,200 mi) at 13:25 UT on April 5, 1963. It then entered a barycentric 90,000 km (56,000 mi) × 700,000 km (430,000 mi) Earth orbit.

Although coverage of the flight was front page news outside of the USSR, details released by TASS, the Soviet news agency, were scant. This irritated Chertok and his team, who felt the secrecy "belittle[d] the real significance of the space program and generate[d] doubt among the public as to its practicality."

Despite (and in some ways because of) the relative lack of information, Western scientists were able to deduce much about the Luna 4 (known as "Lunik 4") mission. For instance, logic dictated that the next step after the prior lunar missions would be either a lunar orbiter or a soft-lander. The comparatively long mission length of 3.5 days implied a larger payload, supporting this belief. That Luna 4 missed the Moon, and by a wider margin than Luna 1 and Luna 3, thus suggested a mission failure.

Additional evidence was provided by Radio Moscow's virtual silence regarding the flight as well as the cancellation of the television program "Hitting the Moon", scheduled for 7:45pm Moscow time on April 5, coinciding with Luna 4's arrival at the Moon. A poetry program and a piano interlude were played instead. TASS reports on the probe were uncharacteristically brief, and the last mention of the probe in the newspaper Pravda was a short reference within a general article on the Moon, which was published April 7.

== Results and status ==
The spacecraft transmitted at 183.6 MHz until 15 April. French and Italian astronomers reported reception of pictures of the Moon taken by Luna 4. A 2.6 metres (8 ft 6 in) telescope in Russia photographed Luna 4 early in its flight when it appeared as a 14th magnitude object. Though Luna 4 did not land on the Moon, it did return data on the radiation environment in cislunar space. The spacecraft reported variations in the radiation flux over time comparable to those measured by previous missions, but with smoother transition times. Because Luna 4, unlike its predecessors, was launched during the least active part of the solar 11 year cycle, it was conjectured that, rather than being caused by sporadic solar outbursts, that the more gentle variations detected by Luna 4 might instead be caused by changes in local magnetic field effects—normally undetectable in more active times. Luna 4 also discovered that the Earth's geomagnetic tail seeped out at least as far as lunar orbit.

Luna 4's path appears to have been perturbed such that it now orbits the Sun rather than the Earth. The Ye-6 program was ultimately successful, with the 12th in the series, Luna 9, landing on the Moon on 3 February 1966.

== See also ==
- List of missions to the Moon
