= Pogo oscillation =

Type of vibration in a rocket engine

Pogo oscillation is a self-excited type of vibration in liquid-propellant rocket engines caused by combustion instability. The unstable combustion results in variations in engine thrust, causing variation in the acceleration exerted upon the vehicle's flexible structure, which in turn causes variations in engine propellant pressure and flow rate, closing the self-excitation cycle.

The name is metaphorical, comparing the longitudinal axis vibration to the bouncing of a pogo stick. Pogo oscillation places stress on the vehicle frame, which can be dangerous if excessive.‍

== Origin ==
NASA Associate Administrator for Manned Space Flight George Mueller explained Apollo 6's pogo oscillation to a congressional hearing:‍

Pogo arises fundamentally because you have thrust fluctuations in the engines. Those are normal characteristics of engines. All engines have what you might call noise in their output because the combustion is not quite uniform, so you have this fluctuation in thrust of the first stage as a normal characteristic of all engine burning.

Now, in turn, the engine is fed through a pipe that takes the fuel out of the tanks and feeds it into the engine. That pipe's length is something like an organ pipe so it has a certain resonance frequency of its own and it really turns out that it will oscillate just like an organ pipe does.

The structure of the vehicle is much like a tuning fork, so if you strike it right, it will oscillate up and down longitudinally. In a gross sense it is the interaction between the various frequencies that causes the vehicle to oscillate.

In general, pogo oscillation occurs when a surge in combustion chamber pressure increases back pressure against the fuel coming into the engine. This reduces fuel flow and thus chamber pressure. The reduced chamber pressure in turn reduces back pressure at the fuel pump, causing more fuel to come in and repeating the cycle. In this way, a rocket engine experiencing pogo oscillations is conceptually operating somewhat like a pulsejet or pulse detonation engine.

If the pulse cycle happens to match a resonance frequency of the rocket, dangerous oscillations can occur through positive feedback, which can, in extreme cases, tear the vehicle apart. Other situations that can induce fuel pressure fluctuations include flexing of fuel pipes.‍‍

Pogo oscillation plagued the Titan II first stage during its development, which delayed man-rating the rocket for the Gemini program. The Saturn V first stage (S-IC) experienced severe pogo oscillation on the flight of Apollo 6, which damaged the S-II and S-IVB stages and likely would have triggered an abort if the flight had carried a crew. The second stage (S-II) had less-intense pogo on other flights.

The oscillations during Apollo 13's ascent caused the center engine to shut down about two minutes earlier than planned. The resulting loss in thrust was compensated for by longer burns from the second and third stages.

== Hazard ==
If the oscillation is left unchecked, failures can result. One case occurred in the middle J-2 engine of the second stage (S-II) of the Apollo 13 lunar mission in 1970. In this case, the engine shut down before the oscillations could cause damage to the vehicle. The later events in this mission, which forced an abort of the planned lunar landing, overshadowed the pogo problem. Pogo also was experienced in the S-IC first stage of the uncrewed Apollo 6 test flight in 1968.‍

One of the Soviet Union's N1-L3 rocket test flights suffered pogo oscillations in the first stage on February 21, 1969. The launch vehicle reached initial engine cutoff, but exploded 107 seconds after liftoff and disintegrated. There are other cases during uncrewed launches in the 1950s and 1960s where the pogo effect caused catastrophic launch failures, such as the first Soviet lunar mission, Luna E-1 No.1, and Luna E-1 No.2, in September and October 1958.‍‍

Modern vibration analysis methods can account for the pogo oscillation to ensure that it is far from the vehicle's resonant frequencies. Suppression methods include damping mechanisms or bellows in propellant lines. The Space Shuttle main engines each had a damper in the liquid oxygen line, but not in the hydrogen fuel line.

== See also ==
- Damping – Influence on an oscillating physical system which reduces or prevents its oscillation
- Feedback – Process where information about current status is used to influence future status
- Resonance – Physical characteristic of oscillating systems
- Slosh dynamics – Movement of liquid inside another moving object
- Vibration analysis – Mechanical oscillations about an equilibrium point
