= List of R-7 launches =

This is a list of launches conducted by the R-7 Semyorka ICBM, and its derivatives. All listed launches are orbital satellite launches unless otherwise noted.

Due to the size of the list, it has been split into several smaller articles:

- List of R-7 launches (1957–1959)
- List of R-7 launches (1960–1964)
- List of R-7 launches (1965–1969)
- List of R-7 launches (1970–1974)
- List of R-7 launches (1975–1979)
- List of R-7 launches (1980–1984)
- List of R-7 launches (1985–1989)
- List of R-7 launches (1990–1994)
- List of R-7 launches (1995–1999)
- List of R-7 launches (2000–2004)
- List of R-7 launches (2005–2009)
- List of R-7 launches (2010–2014)
- List of R-7 launches (2015–2019)
- List of R-7 launches (2020–2024)
- List of R-7 launches (2025–2029)
- Failure
- Partial failure
- Success
- Scheduled

Statistics are up-to-date as of 3 April 2026.
