= Mars 1M No.1 =

Soviet Mars spacecraft

1M No.1
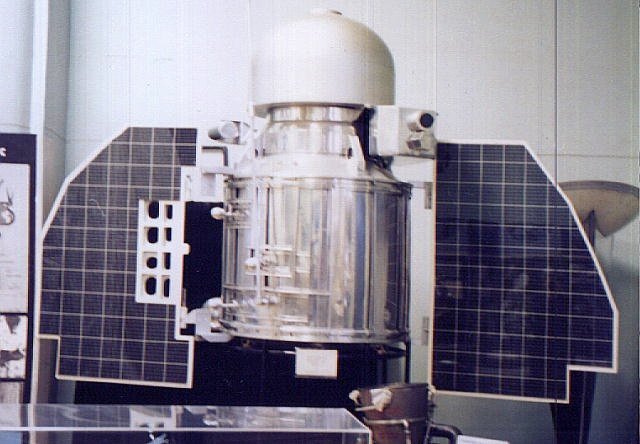
- A Mars 1M spacecraft
- Names: Marsnik-1, Korabl-4, Mars 1960A
- Mission type: Mars flyby
- Mission duration: Failed to orbit
- Apogee: 120 kilometres (75 mi)

Spacecraft properties
- Spacecraft type: Mars 1M
- Manufacturer: OKB-1
- Launch mass: 650 kilograms (1,430 lb)
- Payload mass: 10 kilograms (22 lb)

Start of mission
- Launch date: 10 October 1960, 14:27:49 UTC
- Rocket: Molniya 8K78/L1-4M
- Launch site: Baikonur 1/5

Instruments
- 1) Ultraviolet Spectrometer (Removed) 2) Radiation Detector 3) Ion traps 4) Magnetometer 5) Micrometeorite detector 6) Cosmic-Ray Detectors 7) Television Imaging System (Removed) 8) Spectroreflectometer (Removed)

Mars 1M No.1, designated Mars 1960A by NASA analysts and dubbed Marsnik 1 by the Western media, was the first spacecraft launched as part of the Soviet Union's Mars programme. A Mars 1M spacecraft, it was intended for conducting flight testing system and to study the interplanetary environment between Earth and Mars, but was lost in a launch failure before it could begin its mission.

== Background ==
The successes of Luna 2 and Luna 3 in 1959 raised Soviet morale especially as the United States had yet to make a successful lunar mission (and in fact would not until 1965). Two follow-ups to Luna 3 in April 1960 failed due to launch vehicle malfunctions, but program planners promised Soviet premier Nikita Khrushchev further "space firsts", including missions to Mars and Venus. The 8K72 rocket used for the Luna missions was inadequate to send a payload to either planet, so an entirely new, more powerful R-7 derivative had to be developed. A ten month crash program resulted in the 8K78, later known as "Molniya" booster, which incorporated an R-7 core with more powerful first stage engines and a bigger upper stage, the Blok I. It also included a fourth stage, the Blok L, which would be fired in a parking orbit and allow a more accurate trajectory than the direct ascent of the Luna missions.

With the more capable launch vehicle, Sergei Korolev, the head of the Soviet space program, unveiled a plan to attach landers to the 1M probes in February 1960, less than a year before the launch of the spacecraft. They were described as being the size of a television and weighing no more than 285 kilograms (628 lb). They would be carried by the 1M probes and be detached just before the flyby to make their descent to Mars. In the summer of 1960, models of the landers were tested at altitudes of 50 kilometres (31 mi) using sounding rockets. However, in the end, this plan proved to be too ambitious and was delayed to later Mars missions.

The two Mars probes were delivered to the Baikonur Cosmodrome on 30 August 1960. Ground testing of the probes on 9 September resulted in multiple failures of various systems and components. Due to the numerous problems, it was impossible to launch during the optimal period of the Mars window in late September. The Blok L stage was also delayed as it had not been certified but appeared to work well during preliminary ground tests. The 8K78 rocket was erected on LC-1 on 8 October. The optimal launch window would have been from 20 September to 25 September but the delay meant that the size of the payload had to be reduced. The camera and another instrument designed to test for the presence of life on Mars were removed due to malfunctions and weight limitations. The spacecraft would reach nearest approach to Mars on 13 May 1961.

== Launch ==
Mars 1M No.1 was the payload of the Molniya 8K78 rocket's maiden flight. The rocket, which had serial number L1-4M, was a new derivative of the R-7 series, with a Blok-I third stage replacing the Blok-E used on the Vostok, and a new Blok-L fourth stage. The vehicle lifted off from Site 1/5 at the Baikonur Cosmodrome at 14:27:49 UTC on 10 October 1960 and steered downrange smoothly. The new 8D74K engines in the first stage worked well and everything went according to plan through core stage burn.

== Scientific Instruments ==
- Ultraviolet Spectrometer (Removed)
- Radiation Detector
- Ion traps
- Magnetometer
- Micrometeorite Detector
- Cosmic-Ray Detectors
- Television Imaging System (Removed)
- Spectroreflectometer (Removed)

Television Imaging System, UV Spectrometer and Spectroreflectometer were removed due to mass constraints.

A "possibly apocryphal story" states that after being removed from the spacecraft, the Spectroreflectometer failed to detect life.

== End of mission ==
It was determined that during the course of the second stage of flight, at T+309.9 seconds, a resonant vibration in the third stage of the rocket caused the malfunction of a gyroscope and it damaged the attitude control system of the carrier rocket. Following this issue, the horizon sensor disconnected from the booster and the rocket descended from its normal flight path angle by 7° in pitch. As a consequence, the rocket's third stage was commanded to stop ignition after five minutes and 24 seconds of flight. During this stage the spacecraft flew to an altitude of 120 kilometres (75 mi) before re-entry. Thereafter, the spacecraft re-entered the atmosphere and disintegrated with its debris falling over Siberia 4,800 kilometres (3,000 mi) down range. It failed to achieve low Earth orbit.

== See also ==
- List of missions to Mars
- Magazine "Новости космонавтики" on the soviet spacecraft to mars
