= Lloyd Mallan =

American science writer (1914–1973)

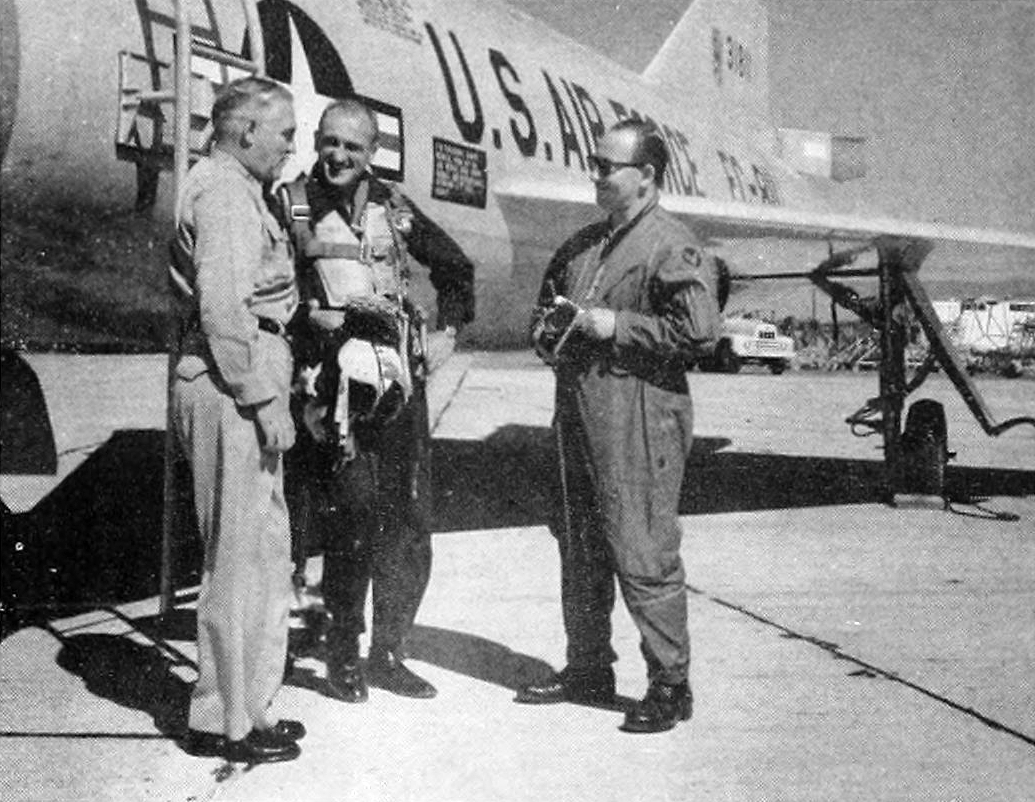
Mallan (right) and Maj. Gen. Robert Burns, USAF, Commander APGC (left), discuss Firebee intercept flights with Maj. Robert T. Goetz, USAF c. 1958

Lloyd Mallan (1914-1973) was a 20th-century American science writer. His works were controversial in that they often went against scientific consensus at the time.

== Early life ==
Mallan was born in Pittsburgh, PA in 1914. He attended Carnegie Tech as a night student.

== Career ==
Mallan joined the Communist party in 1932 and went to Spain from 1937 to 1938 to fight with the Loyalists against the Fascists in the Spanish Civil War. He was a member of the Abraham Lincoln Brigade, a group of American volunteers fighting against the fascists.

After returning from the war, he was a writer and translator. In 1939 he wrote a piece on the assassinated poet Federico García Lorca that "helped shape the public [US] image of him".

Mallan became a full time freelance writer and popularizer of science, and especially space technology, in the 1950s. His works included:

- An article The Big Red Lie, published in the April 11, 1959, issue of True magazine. This article argued that the Soviet Union had fabricated the story that their Luna 1 probe launched in 1959 had flown past the moon. Congressional hearings were held in part due to the popularity of this position. The hearings ultimately concluded that the mission had occurred based on expert testimony and the receipt of radio waves from the probe by US radio antennas.
- An article, Did the Russians Fake the Moon Photos? in Popular Photography, April 1960, claimed that the photos of the far side of the Moon taken by the Soviet Luna 3 spacecraft were faked and were in fact paintings. This view later debunked as better photos of the lunar far side became available.
- The book Peace is a Three-edged Sword, published in 1964, that claims that an accidental nuclear war, such as that depicted in the then-popular movie Dr. Strangelove, is impossible. The conclusion was based on Mallan's interviews of multiple US scientists and military personnel.
- The book It Is Safe to Smoke, published in 1967, that purports to find that charcoal filters in cigarettes makes them safe to smoke.
