= Soviet Mountains =

The Soviet Mountains (Montes Sovietici) were announced to have been discovered on the far side of the Moon, but they never actually existed. Photographs from the Apollo 8 mission showed that this feature is mainly due to crater rays.

In 1959, the Soviet lunar probe Luna 3 became the first human object to photograph the far side of the Moon. The photos taken at that time were extremely blurry because they were taken from 70,000 km away from the Moon, but some terrain was discovered. One of these is the Soviet Mountains, which stretch from 111°E to 124°E and 5°S latitude. It lies between the Marginal Sea, located on the eastern edge of the Moon, further east of the Smith Sea, and the Sea of Moscow.

Soviet astronomers published the 1960 Atlas of the Far Side of the Moon (Editors: N. P. Balabashov, A. A. Mikhailov, Y. N. Lipsky, Moscow, 1960) and named the terrain he discovered. However, some of these place names ignored the convention of naming on the lunar table, and the Soviet mountain ranges also disregarded the custom of naming mountain ranges on Earth, such as the Alps, after mountain ranges. The International Astronomical Union (IAU) approved the Soviet Union's naming but subsequently established clear rules.

However, subsequent clear photographs revealed that the Soviet mountain range did not exist. There, there was a new, vivid crater called a cat, along with beams of light extending from it, and several small craters connected to create a linear image. It is believed that the angle of light and the blurry photographs made it appear like a mountain range. Additionally, another lunar surface feature called the 'Dream Sea (Mare Desiderii)' was reported in the western southern hemisphere, but subsequent observations failed to confirm this (there is a sea called the 'Wise Sea' in this area, but it is a different entity), and it was confirmed not to exist.

(this is a translation from the japanese wikipedia)
