= Luna E-3 No.1 =

Soviet space probe (Luna 1960A)

- Mission type: Lunar flyby
- Operator: Soviet space program
- Mission duration: Failed to orbit

Spacecraft properties
- Spacecraft type: E-3
- Manufacturer: OKB-1
- Launch mass: 279 kilograms (615 lb)

Start of mission
- Launch date: 15 April 1960, 15:06:45 UTC
- Rocket: Luna 8K72 s/n L1-9
- Launch site: Baikonur 1/5

Luna E-3 No.1, sometimes identified by NASA as Luna 1960A, was a Soviet spacecraft which was lost in a launch failure in 1960. It was a 279-kilogram (615 lb) Luna E-3 spacecraft, the first of two to be launched, both of which were lost in launch failures. It was intended to fly around the Moon on a circumlunar trajectory in order to image the surface of the Moon, including the far side. The E-3 spacecraft were similar in design to the E-2A which had been used for the earlier Luna 3 mission. However, they carried higher resolution cameras, and were intended to make closer flybys.

== Launch ==
Luna E-3 No.1 was launched at 15:06:45 UTC on 15 April 1960, atop a Luna 8K72 carrier rocket, flying from Site 1/5 at the Baikonur Cosmodrome. The core stage and strap-ons of the 8K72 booster performed perfectly and Blok E staging and engine start went well at first, but about halfway through its burn, engine thrust and fuel system pressure began dropping, followed by cutoff. Velocity was about 300 feet per second too low to escape the Earth's gravity, and the Blok E and probe fell back into the atmosphere and burned up. The cause of the failure was unclear until further examination of telemetry data found that the RP-1 tank in the Blok E stage was only partially filled, a careless mistake by pad crews that caused the booster to literally and figuratively run out of gas before it could escape Earth orbit. As a result, the spacecraft failed to achieve orbit. Prior to the release of information about its mission, NASA correctly identified that it had been an attempted circumlunar imagery mission.
