= Luna E-3 No.2 =

Soviet space probe (Luna 1960B)

- Mission type: Lunar flyby
- Operator: Soviet space program
- Mission duration: Failed to orbit

Spacecraft properties
- Spacecraft type: E-3
- Manufacturer: OKB-1
- Launch mass: 279 kilograms (615 lb)

Start of mission
- Launch date: 19 April 1960, 16:07:41 UTC
- Rocket: Luna 8K72 s/n L1-9A
- Launch site: Baikonur 1/5

Luna E-3 No.2, sometimes identified by NASA as Luna 1960B, was a Soviet spacecraft which was lost in a launch failure in 1960. It was a 279-kilogram (615 lb) Luna E-3 spacecraft, the second of two to be launched, both of which were lost in launch failures. It was intended to fly around the moon on a circumlunar trajectory in order to image the surface of the Moon, including the far side. The E-3 spacecraft were similar in design to the E-2A which had been used for the earlier Luna 3 mission. However, they carried higher-resolution cameras, and were intended to make closer flybys.

== Launch ==
Luna E-3 No.2 was launched at 16:07:41 UTC on 19 April 1960, atop a Luna 8K72 carrier rocket, flying from Site 1/5 at the Baikonur Cosmodrome. The Blok-B strap-on booster reached only 75% thrust and broke away from the booster almost immediately at liftoff. The launch vehicle climbed to an altitude of about 200 meters before the imbalanced thrust caused it to pitch over, the remaining strap-ons breaking off and scattering in random directions. Two of them plummeted to the ground while the third flew over the head of terrified spectators before impacting and exploding near the vehicle assembly building, shattering its windows. The core stage continued flying for some distance until crashing into a salt lake about two kilometers from the pad. Considerable damage to launch facilities resulted from this mishap. Prior to the release of information about its mission, NASA correctly identified that it had been an attempted circumlunar imagery mission.
