= Tracking transmitter =

Radio signal intended to aid in locating the broadcaster

A tracking transmitter broadcasts a radio signal which can be detected by a directional antenna (typically a Radio Direction Finder). By rotating the antenna one can determine the direction the signal lies in and of course whatever it may be attached to. The EPIRB is an example of a similar device.

It is commonly used in model rocketry and remote control aircraft to locate lost equipment.

== See also ==
- Homing beacon
- Emergency locator beacon
