= Luna E-1 No.3 =

Lost Soviet spacecraft

E-1 No.3
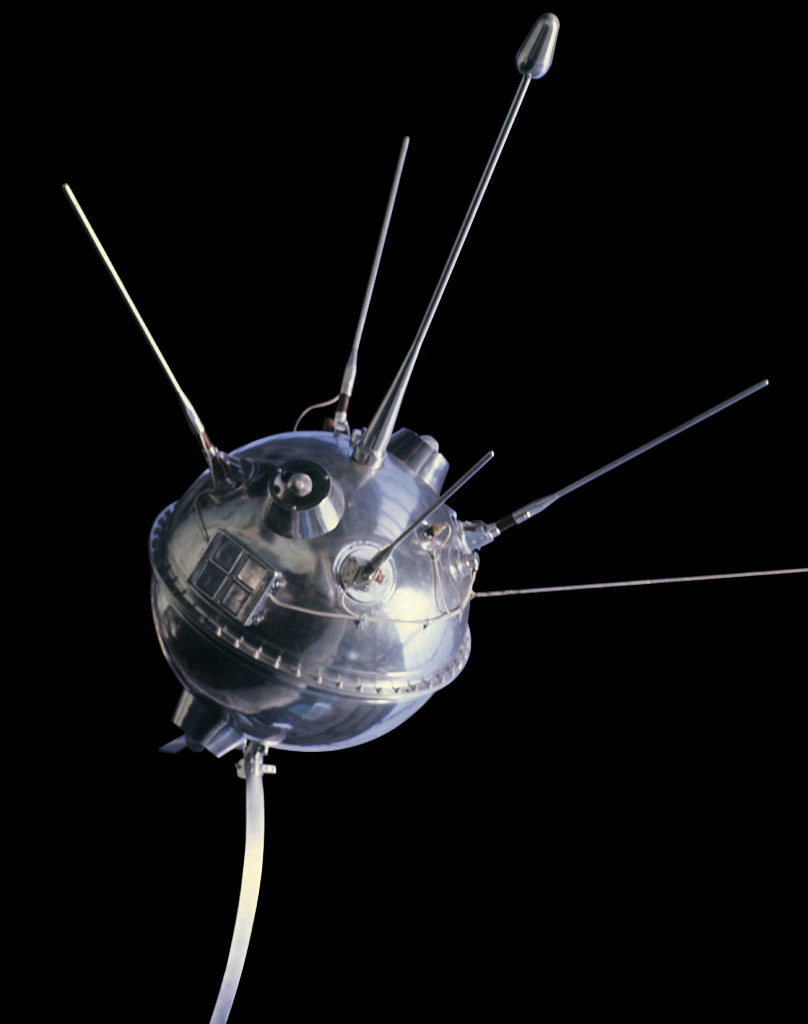
- A replica of an E-1 spacecraft
- Mission type: Lunar impactor
- Operator: Soviet space program
- Mission duration: Failed to orbit

Spacecraft properties
- Manufacturer: OKB-1
- Launch mass: 361 kilograms (796 lb)

Start of mission
- Launch date: 4 December 1958,
- Rocket: Luna 8K72 s/n B1-5
- Launch site: Baikonur 1/5

Luna E-1 No.3, sometimes identified by NASA as Luna 1958C, was a Soviet spacecraft which was lost in a launch failure in 1958. It was a 361-kilogram (796 lb) Luna E-1 spacecraft, the third of four to be launched, all of which were involved in launch failures. It was intended to impact the surface of the Moon, and in doing so become the first man-made object to reach its surface.

The spacecraft was intended to release 1 kilogram (2.2 lb) of sodium, in order to create a cloud of the metal which could be observed from Earth, allowing the spacecraft to be tracked. Prior to the release of information about its mission, NASA correctly identified that it had been an attempted Lunar impact mission.

Luna E-1 No.3 was launched on 4 December 1958 atop a Luna 8K72 carrier rocket, flying from Site 1/5 at the Baikonur Cosmodrome. Modifications to correct the vibration issue on previous launches by installing dampers on the LOX feed lines worked and the booster completed the strap-on burn successfully. However, the launch was another failure as the core stage lost thrust at T+245 seconds. Engine performance fell to 70% and it began deviating from its flight trajectory. The AVD system terminated thrust and the booster fell 4,200 km (2,609 miles) downrange. Investigation found that a gear of the core stage hydrogen peroxide pump was improperly lubricated and failed during flight, causing loss of turbopump performance and engine thrust.
