= Luna 1 =

Soviet spacecraft

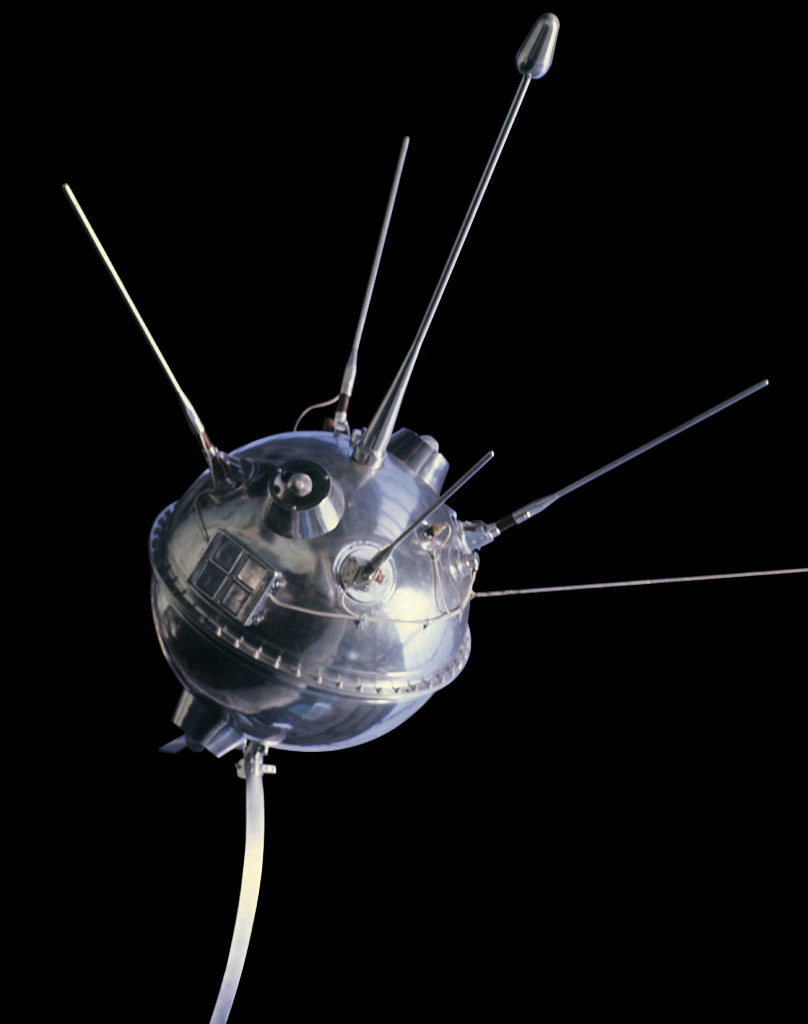
- A museum replica
- Mission type: Lunar impactor
- Operator: Soviet space program
- Harvard designation: 1959 Mu 1
- COSPAR ID: 1959-012A
- SATCAT no.: 00112
- Mission duration: Approximately 62 hours

Spacecraft properties
- Spacecraft type: Ye-1
- Manufacturer: OKB-1
- Launch mass: 361.3 kilograms (797 lb)

Start of mission
- Launch date: 2 January 1959, 16:41:21 UTC
- Rocket: Luna 8K72
- Launch site: Baikonur, Site 1/5

End of mission
- Last contact: 5 January 1959

Orbital parameters
- Reference system: Heliocentric
- Semi-major axis: 1.146 AU
- Eccentricity: 0.14767
- Perihelion altitude: 0.9766 AU
- Aphelion altitude: 1.315 AU
- Inclination: 0.01°
- Period: 450 days
- Epoch: 1 January 1959, 19:00:00 GMT

Lunar flyby (failed impact)
- Closest approach: 4 January 1959
- Distance: 5,995 kilometres (3,725 mi)

Luna 1, also known as Mechta (Russian: Мечта [mʲɪt͡ɕˈta], lit.: Dream), E-1 No.4 and First Lunar Rover, was the first spacecraft to reach the vicinity of Earth's Moon, the first spacecraft to leave Earth's orbit, and the first to be placed in heliocentric orbit. Luna 1 was launched as part of the Soviet Luna programme in 1959.

Initially intended as a Moon impactor, a malfunction in the ground-based control system caused an error in the upper stage rocket's burn time, and the spacecraft missed the Moon by 5,900 km (more than three times the Moon's radius). Nevertheless, Luna 1 became the first human-made object to reach heliocentric orbit and was dubbed "Artificial Planet 1" and renamed Mechta (Dream). Luna 1 was also referred to as the "First Cosmic Ship", in reference to its achievement of Earth escape velocity.

== Spacecraft ==
The satellite and rocket carrying Luna 1 was originally referred to as the Soviet Space Rocket by the Soviet Press. Pravda writer Alexander Kazantsev called it Mechta (Russian: Мечта, meaning 'dream'). Citizens of Moscow unofficially deemed it Lunik, a combination of Luna (Moon) and Sputnik. It was renamed to Luna 1 in 1963.

The spherical satellite was powered by mercury-oxide batteries and silver-zinc accumulators. There were five antennas on one hemisphere, four whip-style and one rigid, for communication purposes. The spacecraft also contained radio equipment including a tracking transmitter and telemetry system. There was no propulsion system.

Luna 1 was designed to impact the Moon, delivering two metallic pennants with the Soviet coat of arms that were included into its payload package. It also had six instruments to study the Moon upon its suicidal approach. The flux-gate magnetometer was triaxial and could measure ± 3000 gammas. It was designed to detect lunar magnetic fields. Two micrometeorite detectors, developed by Tatiana Nazarova of the Vernadsky Institute, were installed on the spacecraft. They each consisted of a metal plate with springs and could detect small impacts. Four ion traps, used to measure solar wind and plasma, were included. They were developed by Konstantin Gringauz. The scientific payload also included two gas-discharge Geiger counters, a sodium-iodide scintillation counter, and a Cherenkov detector. The upper stage of the rocket contained a scintillation counter and 1 kilogram (2.2 lb) of sodium for a gas-dispersion experiment.

The spacecraft weighed 361.3 kilograms (797 lb) at launch, and was about 1.22 metres (4.0 ft) in diameter.

== Launch ==
Luna 1 was launched at 16:41 GMT (22:41 local time) on 2 January 1959 from Site 1/5 at the Baikonur Cosmodrome by a Luna 8K72 rocket. The first three stages operated nominally. The Soviet engineers did not trust automated systems for controlling the engine burns, so they communicated to the rocket via radio. The signal to stop firing the engine Block E stage was delayed, and the prolonged burn imparted an extra 175 metres per second (570 ft/s) to Luna 1.

Consequently Luna 1 missed its target by 5,995 kilometers (3,725 mi). The spacecraft passed within 5,995–6,400 kilometers (3,725–3,977 mi) of the Moon's surface on 4 January after 34 hours of flight, and then became the first human made object to leave Earth's orbit on January 6, 1959. Luna 1 ran out of battery power on 5 January, when it was 597,000 kilometers (371,000 mi) from Earth, making it impossible to track further. The batteries were designed for a minimum of 40 hours but lasted for 62.

Luna 1 became the first artificial object to reach the escape velocity of the Earth, along with its carrier rocket's 1,472-kilogram (3,245 lb) upper stage, which it separated from after being the first spacecraft to reach heliocentric orbit. It remains in orbit around the Sun, between the orbits of Earth and Mars, completing a circuit every 450 days.

== Experiment results ==
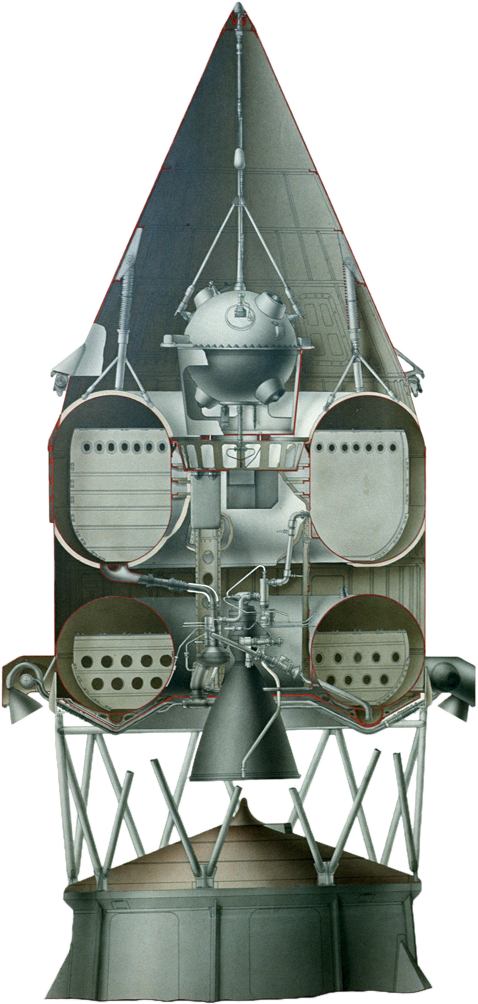
Luna 1 Blok E upper stage and payload configuration.

At 00:57 GMT on 3 January 1959, at a distance of 113,000 kilometres (70,000 mi) from Earth, 1 kilogram (2.2 lb) of sodium gas was released by the spacecraft, forming a cloud behind it to serve as an artificial comet. The cloud was released for two purposes: to allow visual tracking of the spacecraft's trajectory and to observe the behavior of gas in space. This glowing orange trail of gas, visible over the Indian Ocean with the brightness of a sixth-magnitude star for a few minutes, was photographed by Mstislav Gnevyshev at the Mountain Station of the Main Astronomical Observatory of the Academy of Sciences of the USSR near Kislovodsk.

External image
- Image of sodium cloud

While traveling through the outer Van Allen radiation belt, the spacecraft's scintillator made observations indicating that a small number of high-energy particles exist in the outer belt. The measurements obtained during this mission provided new data on the Earth's radiation belt and outer space. The craft was unable to detect a lunar magnetic field which placed an upper limit on its strength of 1/10,000th of Earth's. The first-ever direct observations and measurements of solar wind, a strong flow of ionized plasma emanating from the Sun and streaming through interplanetary space, were performed. The ionized plasma concentration was measured to be some 700 particles per cm^{3} at altitudes of 20,000–25,000 kilometres (12,000–16,000 mi) and 300 to 400 particles per cm^{3} at altitudes of 100,000–50,000 kilometres (62,000–31,000 mi). The spacecraft also marked the first instance of radio communication at the half-million-kilometer distance.

== Reaction ==
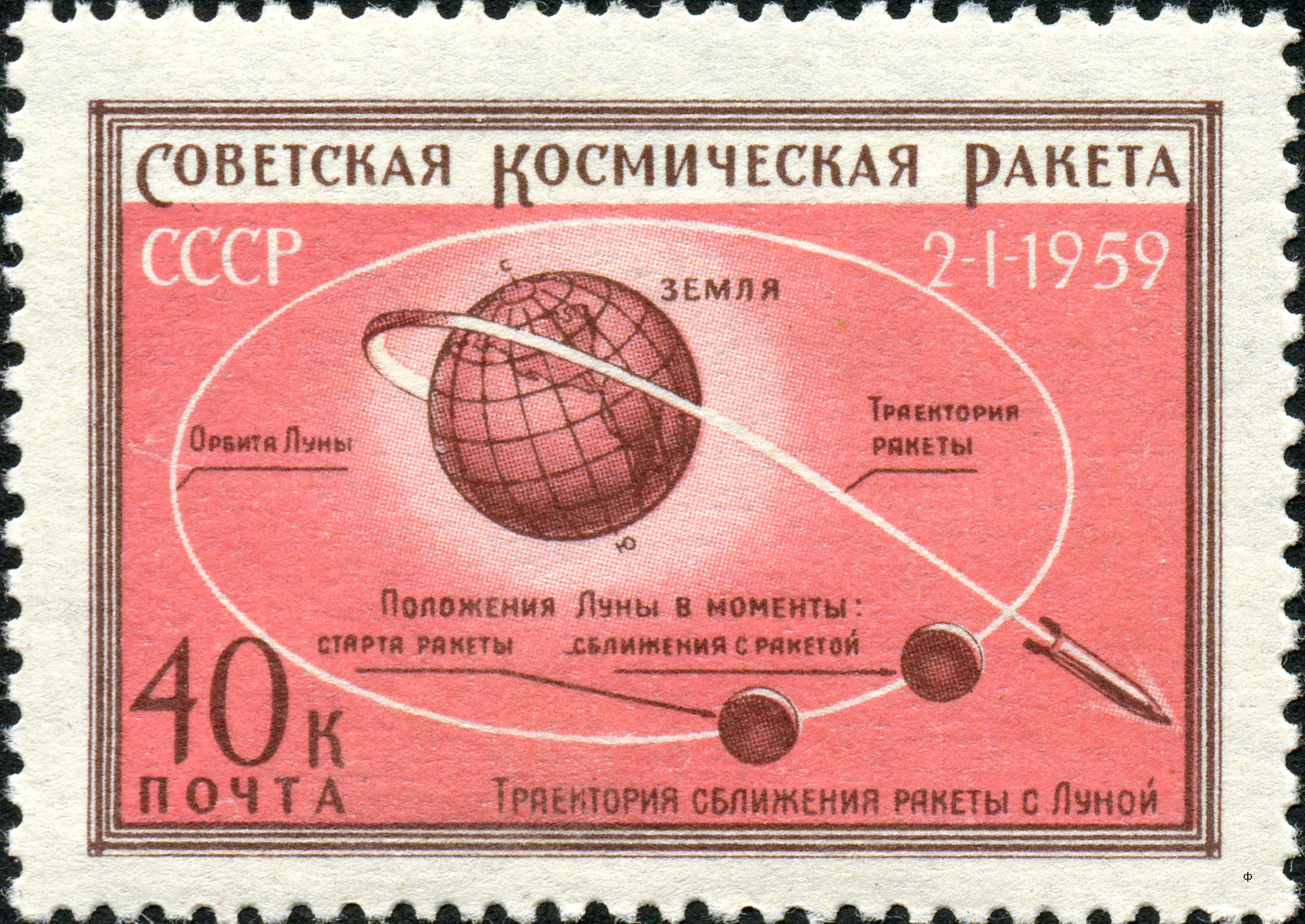
Route of Luna 1 on a Soviet stamp.

Some doubted the veracity of the Soviets' claim of mission success. Lloyd Mallan wrote about it in a book called The Big Red Lie. Many in the West did not receive transmissions from the spacecraft even though the Soviets publicized them before the flight. By the time the Earth rotated so that scientists in the United States could pick up signals from the spacecraft, it was already 171,000 kilometers (106,000 mi) away. In May 1959 several hearings Soviet Space Technology before the Committee on Science and Astronautics and Special Subcommittee on Lunik Probe of the United States House of Representatives attested the achievements of the Soviet mission and its sophisticated guidance technology.

The Soviet Union issued stamps to commemorate their success.

== Subsequent missions ==
Luna 2, the second spacecraft of the Ye-1A series, successfully completed the mission on 13 September 1959.

== See also ==
- Pioneer 4 – a similar NASA mission launched 3 March 1959, two months after Luna 1.
- List of missions to the Moon
