= Luna E-1 No.2 =

1958 Soviet spacecraft

E-1 No.2
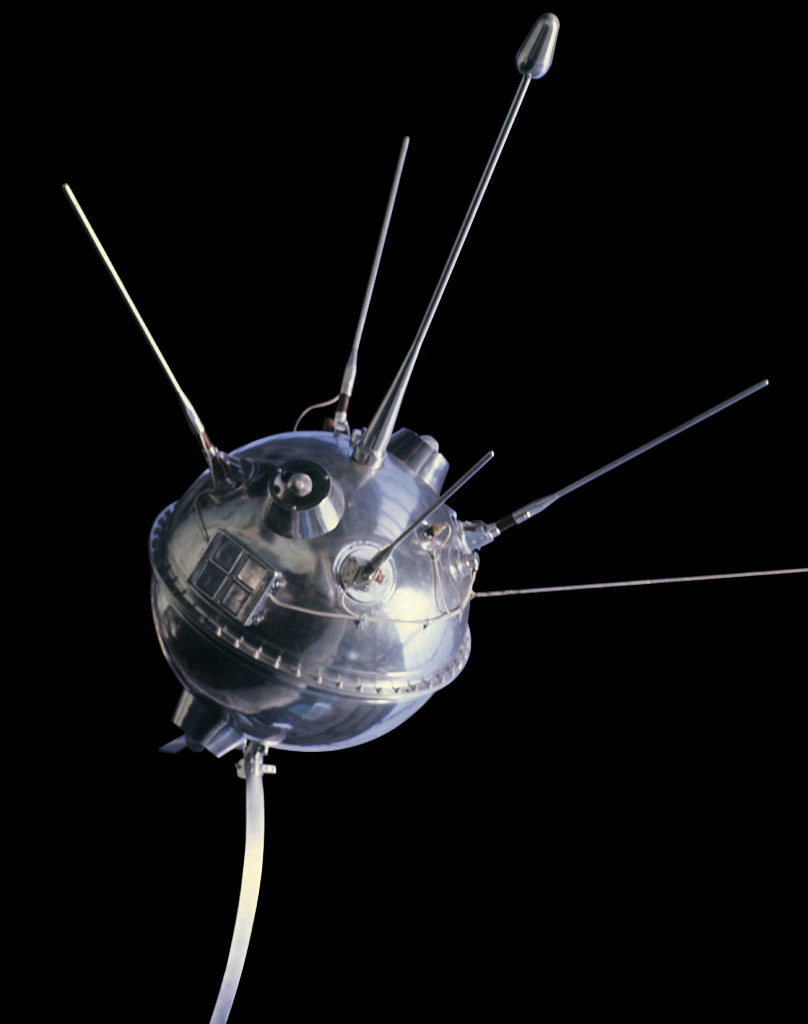
- A replica of an E-1 spacecraft
- Mission type: Lunar impactor
- Operator: Soviet space program
- Mission duration: Failed to orbit

Spacecraft properties
- Manufacturer: OKB-1
- Launch mass: 361 kilograms (796 lb)

Start of mission
- Launch date: 11 October 1958
- Rocket: Luna 8K72 s/n B1-4
- Launch site: Baikonur 1/5

Luna E-1 No.2, sometimes identified by NASA as Luna 1958B, was a Soviet spacecraft which was lost in a launch failure in 1958. It was a 361-kilogram (796 lb) Luna E-1 spacecraft, the second of four to be launched. It was intended to impact the surface of the Moon, and in doing so become the first man-made object to reach its surface.

The spacecraft was intended to release 1 kilogram (2.2 lb) of sodium, in order to create a cloud of the metal which could be observed from Earth, allowing the spacecraft to be tracked. Prior to the release of information about its mission, NASA correctly identified that it had been an attempted Lunar impact mission.

Facing continued political pressure to beat the US, Sergei Korolev lost his temper and exclaimed "Do you think only American rockets explode!?" Once again, he knew that the Pioneer 1 probe was set for launch on October 11, but again decided to wait. Just like with the attempt in August, the US Moon shot failed to attain orbit.

Luna E-1 No.2 was launched on 12 October 1958 atop a Luna 8K72 carrier rocket, flying from Site 1/5 at the Baikonur Cosmodrome. As the Pogo oscillation issue on Luna E-1 No.1 could not be adequately resolved due to the rushed launch schedules, a couple of stopgap measures were tried including disabling the propellant utilization system at T+85 seconds and throttling the engines down to reduce structural loads on the stack. The booster flew until T+104 seconds when it exploded once again from vibration rupturing the propellant lines.
