= Luna E-1 No.1 =

Soviet space probe (Luna 1958A)

E-1 No.1
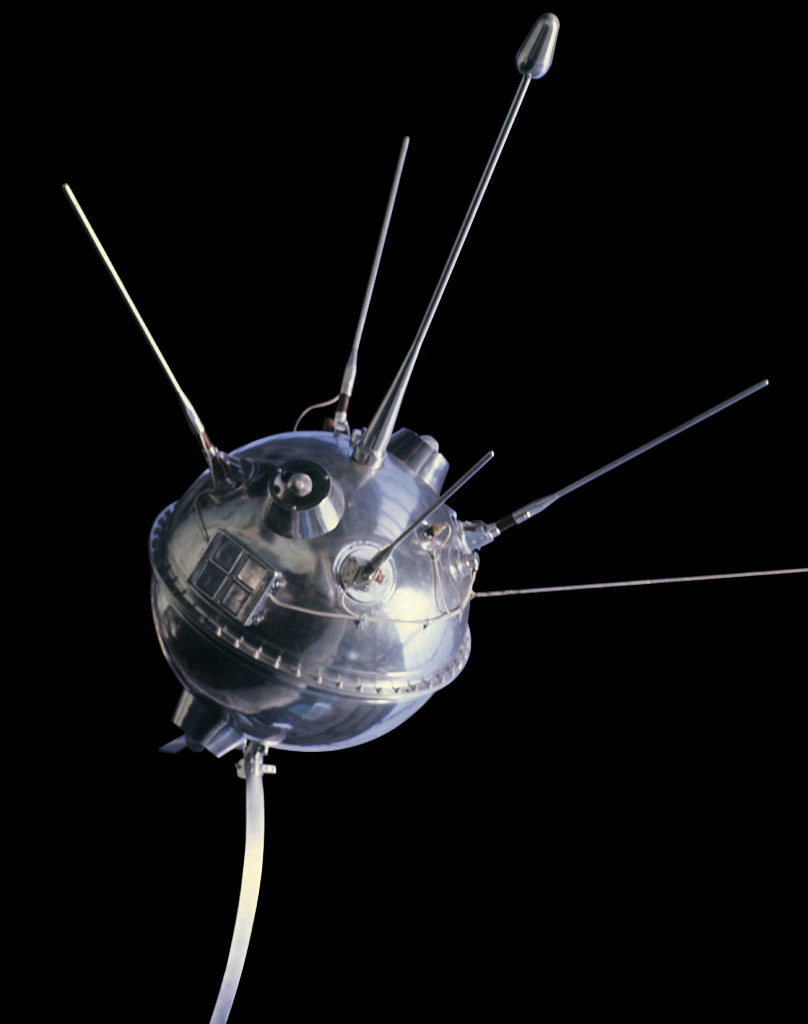
- A replica of an E-1 spacecraft
- Mission type: Lunar impactor
- Operator: Soviet space program
- Mission duration: Failed to orbit

Spacecraft properties
- Manufacturer: OKB-1
- Launch mass: 361 kg

Start of mission
- Launch date: 23 September 1958; 07:40:23 GMT
- Rocket: Luna 8K72 s/n B1-3
- Launch site: Baikonur, Site 1/5

Luna E-1 No.1, sometimes identified by NASA as Luna 1958A, was a Soviet Luna E-1 spacecraft which was intended to impact the Moon. It did not accomplish this objective as it was lost in a launch failure. It was the first of four E-1 missions to be launched.

Luna E-1 No.1 was a 361-kilogram (796 lb) spacecraft which marked the first Soviet attempt to send a spacecraft to the Moon. It was also the first mission of the Luna programme. The spacecraft was intended to release 1 kilogram (2.2 lb) of sodium, in order to create a "comet" of the metal which could be observed from Earth, allowing the spacecraft to be tracked. Prior to the release of information about its mission, NASA correctly identified that it had been an attempted lunar impact mission.

Chief Designer Sergei Korolev's ambitious space plans were being continually frustrated by design changes to the R-7 missile, launch failures, and the fact that the ICBM program took priority. On 10 July 1958, a partial test version of the Luna 8K72 was launched without the Blok E upper stage but with the core and strap-ons of the 8K72 which had thicker-gauge tank walls and the AVD malfunction detection system. Almost immediately at liftoff, the Blok D strap-on suffered an engine malfunction and broke off the booster, impacting on the pad and exploding. The rest of the vehicle crashed a few hundred feet away. This accident, which caused considerable damage to Site 1/5, was traced to high frequency combustion instability in the strap-on RD-107 engines, something that would become a persistent problem on R-7 launches over the next two years. Since the first Luna probe was scheduled for launch in a month, repairs on the pad were done at breakneck speed.

As Korolev knew that the United States was planning to launch a lunar probe on 17 August 1958, he faced considerable pressure getting the Luna and its booster ready for launch. Despite a number of technical issues, the pad crews managed to get the booster ready on the 17 August 1958, but Korolev instead decided to let the US flight go first on the reasoning that the Luna probe had a shorter trajectory to travel and would reach the Moon first. After that launch ended in a booster explosion, he decided to postpone the flight until the glitches with the 8K72 and Luna could be worked out.

Luna E-1 No.1 was launched on 23 September 1958 atop a Luna 8K72 carrier rocket, flying from Site 1/5 at the Baikonur Cosmodrome. The booster lifted and flew until T+92 seconds when it suddenly exploded. This failure was traced to the resonant vibration issue that occurred on Sputnik 3 last spring and thought corrected, but the addition of the Blok E stage increased the length of the booster and moved its center of gravity. As the strap-on propellant tanks began emptying near the end of their burn, increased vibration began to shake them until it finally ruptured the propellant feed lines and caused an explosion.
