= Luna (rocket) =

Model of carrier rocket

Luna (8K727)
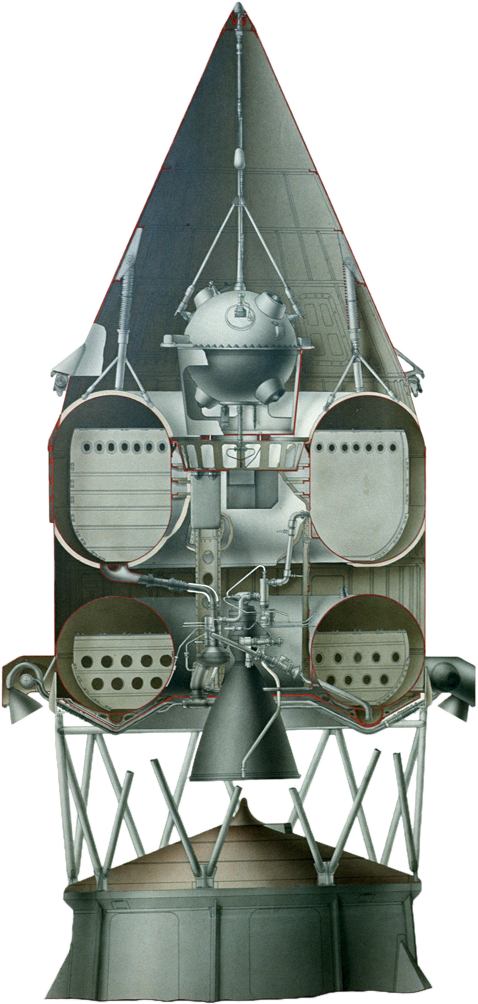
- Block E upper stage, with Luna payload
- Function: Small-lift launch vehicle
- Manufacturer: OKB-1
- Country of origin: Soviet Union

Size
- Mass: 277,000 kg (611,000 lb)
- Stages: 3

Capacity

Payload to LEO
- Mass: 4,000 kg (8,800 lb)

Associated rockets
- Family: R-7

Launch history
- Status: Retired
- Launch sites: Baikonur, Site 1/5
- Total launches: 9
- Failure: 5
- Partial failure: 1
- First flight: 23 September 1958
- Last flight: 16 April 1960
- Carries passengers or cargo: Luna probes

Boosters (First stage) – Block B, V, G & D (Note: This is a transliteration of the second through fifth letters of the Cyrillic alphabet (Б, В, Г, Д). A sense-for-sense translation would correspond to the second through fifth letters of the Latin alphabet, 'Block B, C, D & E'.)
- No. boosters: 4
- Powered by: 1 × RD-107-8D74-1959
- Maximum thrust: 990 kN (220,000 lb_{f})
- Total thrust: 3,960 kN (890,000 lb_{f})
- Burn time: 120 seconds
- Propellant: LOX / Kerosene

Second stage (core) – Block A
- Powered by: 1 × RD-108-8D75-1959
- Maximum thrust: 936.5 kN (210,500 lb_{f})
- Burn time: 320 seconds
- Propellant: LOX / Kerosene

Third stage – Block E (Note: This is a transliteration of the sixth letter of the Cyrillic alphabet (E). A sense-for-sense translation would correspond to the sixth letter of the Latin alphabet, 'Block F'.)
- Powered by: 1 × RD-0105
- Maximum thrust: 49 kN (11,000 lb_{f})
- Burn time: 316 seconds
- Propellant: LOX / Kerosene

The Luna 8K72 vehicles were carrier rockets used by the Soviet Union for nine space probe launch attempts in the Luna programme between 23 September 1958 and 16 April 1960. Like many other Soviet launchers of that era, the Luna 8K72 vehicles were derived from the R-7 Semyorka design, part of the R-7 rocket family, which was also the basis for the Vostok and modern Soyuz rockets.

The 8K72 was the first R-7 variant explicitly designed as a carrier rocket and it incorporated a few features that became standard on all later R-7 carrier rockets including thicker tank walls to support the weight of upper stages and the AVD malfunction detection system, which would terminate engine thrust if the booster's operating parameters (engine performance, electrical power, or flight trajectory) deviated from normal.

== Launches ==
Luna 8K72 was launched nine times from Baikonur LC-1/5:

Launch Date	Serial No.	LS	Payload	Result
23 September 1958	B1-3	Ba LC-1/5	Luna E-1 No.1	Failure
11 October 1958	B1-4	Ba LC-1/5	Luna E-1 No.2	Failure
4 December 1958	B1-5	Ba LC-1/5	Luna E-1 No.3	Failure
2 January 1959	B1-6	Ba LC-1/5	Luna 1	Success
18 June 1959	I1-7	Ba LC-1/5	Luna E-1A No.1	Failure
12 September 1959	I1-7B	Ba LC-1/5	Luna 2	Success
4 October 1959	I1-8	Ba LC-1/5	Luna 3	Success
15 April 1960	L1-9	Ba LC-1/5	Luna E-3 No.1	Partial Failure
16 April 1960	L1-9A	Ba LC-1/5	Luna E-3 No.2	Failure

The first flight of a Luna 8K72 (September 1958), which was to launch the Luna E-1 No.1 probe, ended 92 seconds after launch when the rocket broke up from longitudinal ("pogo") oscillations, causing the strap-ons to separate from the vehicle, which then crashed downrange.

The second flight of a Luna 8K72 (October 1958), which was to launch the Luna E-1 No.2 probe, ended 104 seconds after launch when the rocket again disintegrated from vibration.

The third flight of a Luna 8K72 (December 1958), which was to launch the Luna E-1 No.3 probe, ended 245 seconds after launch when the Blok A core stage shut down from loss of engine lubricant.

The resonant vibration problem suffered by the 8K72 booster was the cause of a major argument between the Korolev and Glushko design bureaus. It was believed that the vibrations developed as a consequence of adding the Blok E upper stage to the R-7, shifting its center of mass.

The first probe launched by a Luna 8K72 to reach orbit was Luna 1, launched on 2 January 1959, which was intended as a lunar impactor mission. Luna 1 instead passed within 5,995 kilometres (3,725 mi) of the Moon's surface 4 January 1959, and then went into orbit around the Sun between the orbits of Earth and Mars.

The fifth flight of a Luna 8K72 (18 June 1959), which was to launch the Luna E-1A No.1 probe, ended 153 seconds after launch due to a guidance malfunction of the Blok A core stage, leading to engine shutdown.

Luna 2 was launched by a Luna 8K72 on 12 September 1959. It was the first spacecraft to impact the lunar surface.

The final successful launch of a Luna 8K72 took place on 4 October 1959. The Luna 3 spacecraft took the first photographs of the far side of the Moon.

The eighth flight of a Luna 8K72 (March 1960), which was to launch the Luna E-3 No.1 probe, ended 435 seconds after launch when the Blok E upper stage developed insufficient thrust, causing the Luna probe to reenter the atmosphere and burn up.

The ninth flight of a Luna 8K72 (April 1960), which was to launch the Luna E-3 No.2 probe, failed when the Blok G strap-on booster developed only 75% thrust at liftoff, breaking away from the launch vehicle, which then disintegrated, the strap-ons flying in random directions and exploding as they impacted the ground. The Blok A core stage then crashed into a salt lake.
