= Luna 3 =

Soviet lunar probe launched in 1959

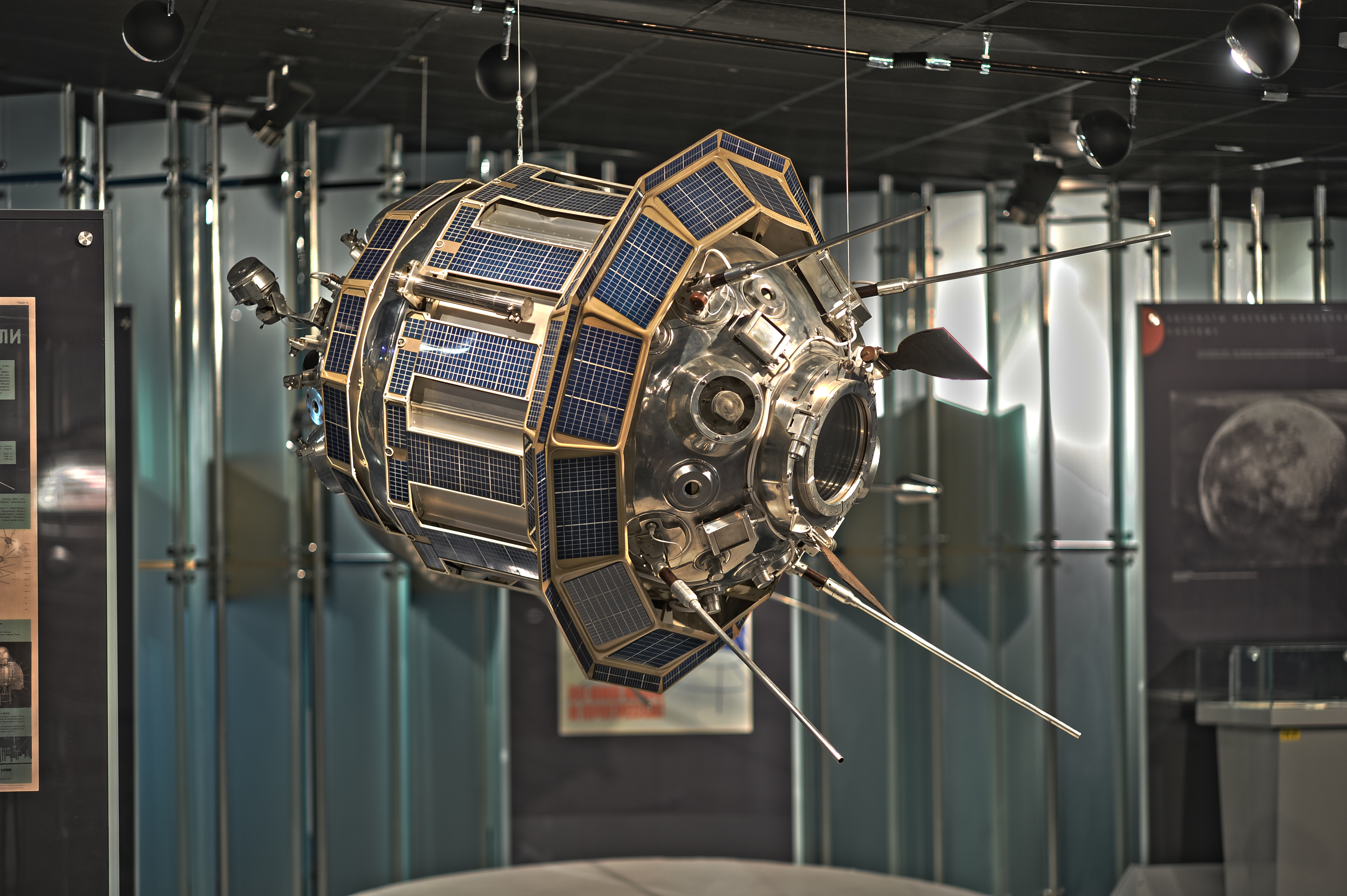
- A 1:1 scale model at the Memorial Museum of Cosmonautics in Moscow
- Mission type: Lunar flyby
- Operator: Soviet space program
- Harvard designation: 1959 Theta 1
- COSPAR ID: 1959-008A
- SATCAT no.: 21
- Mission duration: 18 days (launch day to last contact day)
- Orbits completed: 14

Spacecraft properties
- Spacecraft: Ye-2A No.1
- Manufacturer: OKB-1
- Launch mass: 278.5 kilograms (614 lb)

Start of mission
- Launch date: 4 October 1959, 00:43:40 UTC
- Rocket: Luna 8K72 (No I1-8)
- Launch site: Baikonur 1/5

End of mission
- Last contact: 22 October 1959
- Decay date: 29 April 1960

Orbital parameters
- Reference system: Geocentric
- Regime: Highly elliptical (circumlunar)
- Semi-major axis: 256,620.50 kilometres (159,456.59 mi)
- Eccentricity: 0.97322501
- Perigee altitude: 500 kilometres (310 mi)
- Apogee altitude: 499,999 kilometres (310,685 mi)
- Inclination: 55 degrees
- Period: 359.38 hours
- Epoch: 5 October 1959

Flyby of the Moon
- Closest approach: 6 October 1959, 14:16 UTC
- Distance: 6,200 kilometres (3,900 mi)

Luna 3, or E-2A No.1 (Russian: Луна 3), was a Soviet spacecraft launched in 1959 as part of the Luna programme. It was the first mission to photograph the far side of the Moon and the third Soviet space probe to be sent to the neighborhood of the Moon. The historic, never-before-seen views of the far side of the Moon caused excitement and interest when they were published around the world, and a tentative Atlas of the Far Side of the Moon was created from the pictures.

These views showed mountainous terrain, very different from the near side, and only two dark, low-lying regions, which were named Mare Moscoviense (Sea of Moscow) and Mare Desiderii (Sea of Desire). Mare Desiderii was later found to be composed of a smaller mare, Mare Ingenii (Sea of Cleverness), and several other dark craters. The reason for this difference between the two sides of the Moon is still not fully understood, but it seems that most of the dark lavas that flowed out to produce the maria formed under the Earth-facing half.

== Design ==
The space probe was a cylindric canister with hemispheric ends and a wide flange near the top. The probe was 130 centimetres (51 in) long and 120 centimetres (47 in) at its maximum diameter at the flange. Most of the cylindric section was roughly 95 centimetres (37 in) in diameter. The canister was hermetically sealed and pressurized to about 0.22 standard atmospheres (22 kPa). Several solar cells were mounted on the outside of the cylinder, and these provided electric power to the storage batteries inside the space probe.

Shutters for thermal control were positioned along the cylinder and opened to expose a radiating surface when the internal temperature exceeded 25 °C (298 K). The upper hemisphere of the probe held the covered opening for the cameras. Four antennas protruded from the top of the probe and two from its bottom. Other scientific equipment was mounted on the outside, including micrometeoroid and cosmic ray detectors, and the Yenisey-2 imaging system. The gas jets for its attitude control system were mounted on the lower end of the spacecraft. Several photoelectric cells helped maintain orientation with respect to the Sun and the Moon.

There were no rocket motors for course corrections.

Its interior held the cameras and the photographic film processing system, radio transmitter, storage batteries, gyroscopic units, and circulating fans for temperature control. It was spin-stabilized for most of its flight, but its three-axis attitude control system was activated while taking photos. Luna 3 was radio-controlled from ground stations in the Soviet Union.

The Soviet media called the spacecraft the Automatic Interplanetary Station. The probe was renamed to Luna 3 in 1963.

== Mission ==
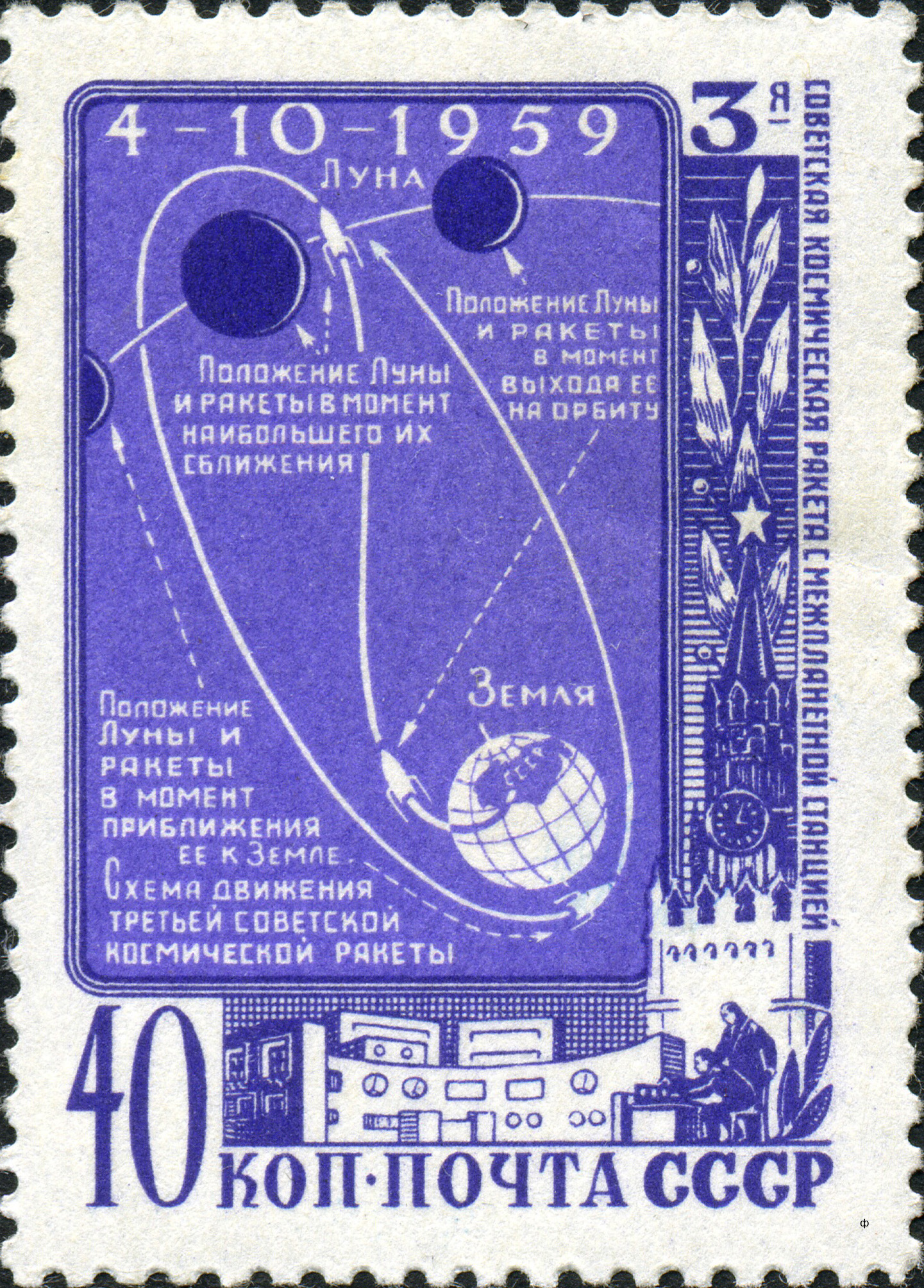
Luna 3 mission on a Soviet stamp

After launching on a Luna 8K72 (number I1-8) rocket over the North Pole, the Blok-E escape stage was shut down by radio control to put Luna 3 on its course to the Moon. Initial radio contact showed that the signal from the space probe was only about one-half as strong as expected, and the internal temperature was rising. The spacecraft spin axis was reoriented and some equipment was shut down, resulting in a temperature drop from 40 °C to about 30 °C. At a distance of 60,000 to 70,000 km from the Moon, the orientation system was turned on and the spacecraft rotation was stopped. The lower end of the craft was pointed at the Sun, which was shining on the far side of the Moon.

The space probe passed within 6,200 km of the Moon near its south pole at the closest lunar approach at 14:16 UT on 6 October 1959, and continued over the far side. On 7 October, the photocell on the upper end of the space probe detected the sunlit far side of the Moon, and the photography sequence was started. The first picture was taken at 03:30 UT at a distance of 63,500 km from the Moon, and the last picture was taken 40 minutes later from a distance of 66,700 km.

A total of 29 pictures were taken, covering 70% of the far side. After the photography was complete the spacecraft resumed spinning, passed over the north pole of the Moon and returned towards the Earth. Attempts to transmit the pictures to the Soviet Union began on 8 October but the early attempts were unsuccessful due to the low signal strength. As Luna 3 drew closer to the Earth, a total of about 17 photographs were transmitted by 18 October. All contact with the probe was lost on 22 October 1959. The space probe was believed to have burned up in the Earth's atmosphere in March or April 1960. Another possibility was that it survived in orbit until 1962 or later.

It was launched initially in an orbit with the perigee outside the upper boundary of the Earth's atmosphere. After the mission was accomplished, and the probe made several orbits around the Earth, the secular rise in the eccentricity resulted in a decrease of the perigee because the semimajor axis is conserved. After eleven orbital revolutions Luna-3 entered the atmosphere of the Earth. It is the first instance of a "man-made Lidov-Kozai effect".

=== First gravity assist ===
Luna 3 trajectory and the gravity assist maneuver

The gravity assist maneuver was first used in 1959 when Luna 3 photographed the far side of Earth's Moon. After launch from the Baikonur Cosmodrome, Luna 3 passed behind the Moon from south to north and headed back to Earth. The gravity of the Moon changed the spacecraft's orbit; also, because of the Moon's own orbital motion, the spacecraft's orbital plane was also changed. The return orbit was calculated so that the spacecraft passed again over the Northern hemisphere where the Soviet ground stations were located. The maneuver relied on research performed under the direction of Mstislav Keldysh at the Steklov Institute of Mathematics.

== Lunar photography ==
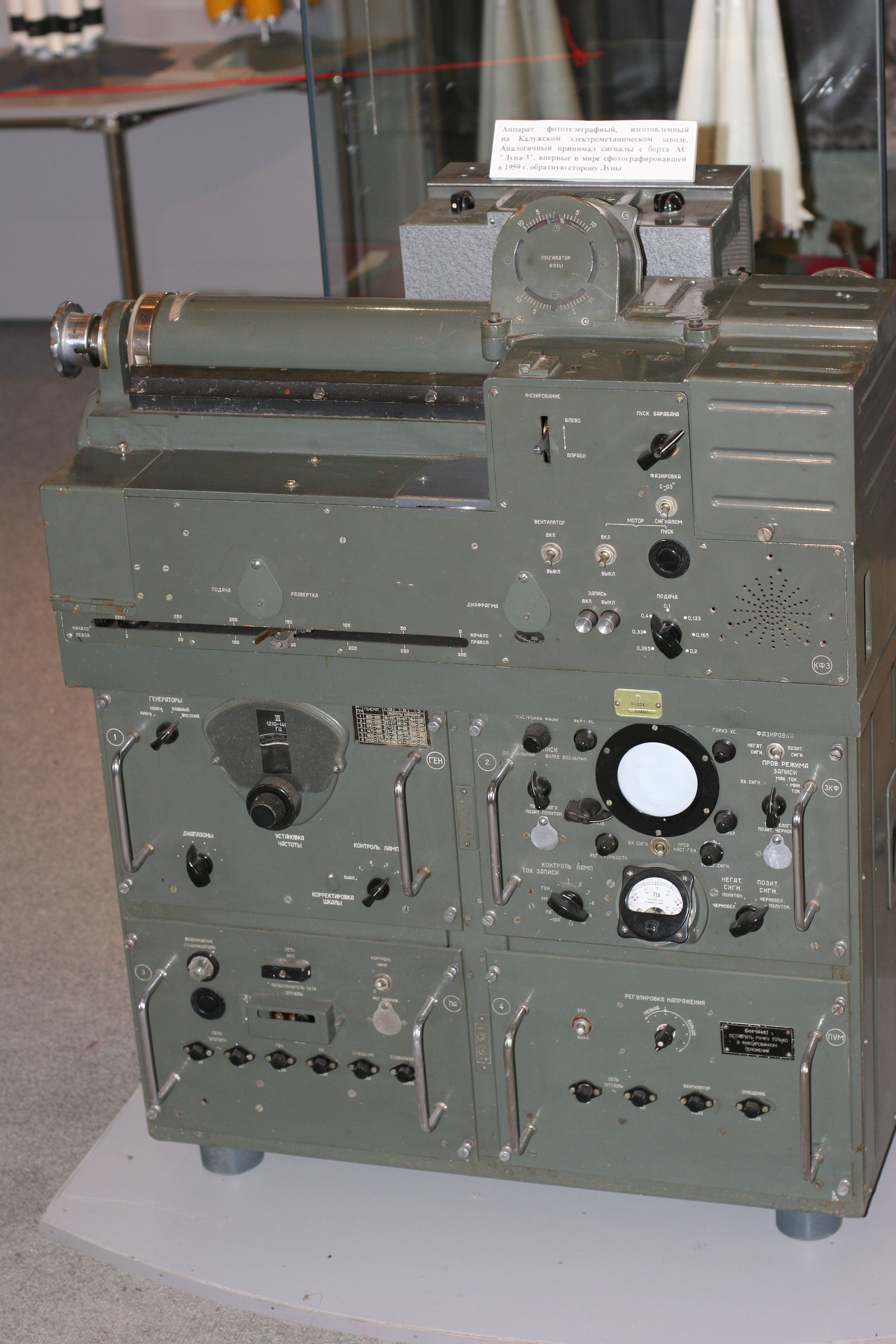
Luna 3 phototelegraph system at Tsiolkovsky State Museum of the History of Cosmonautics

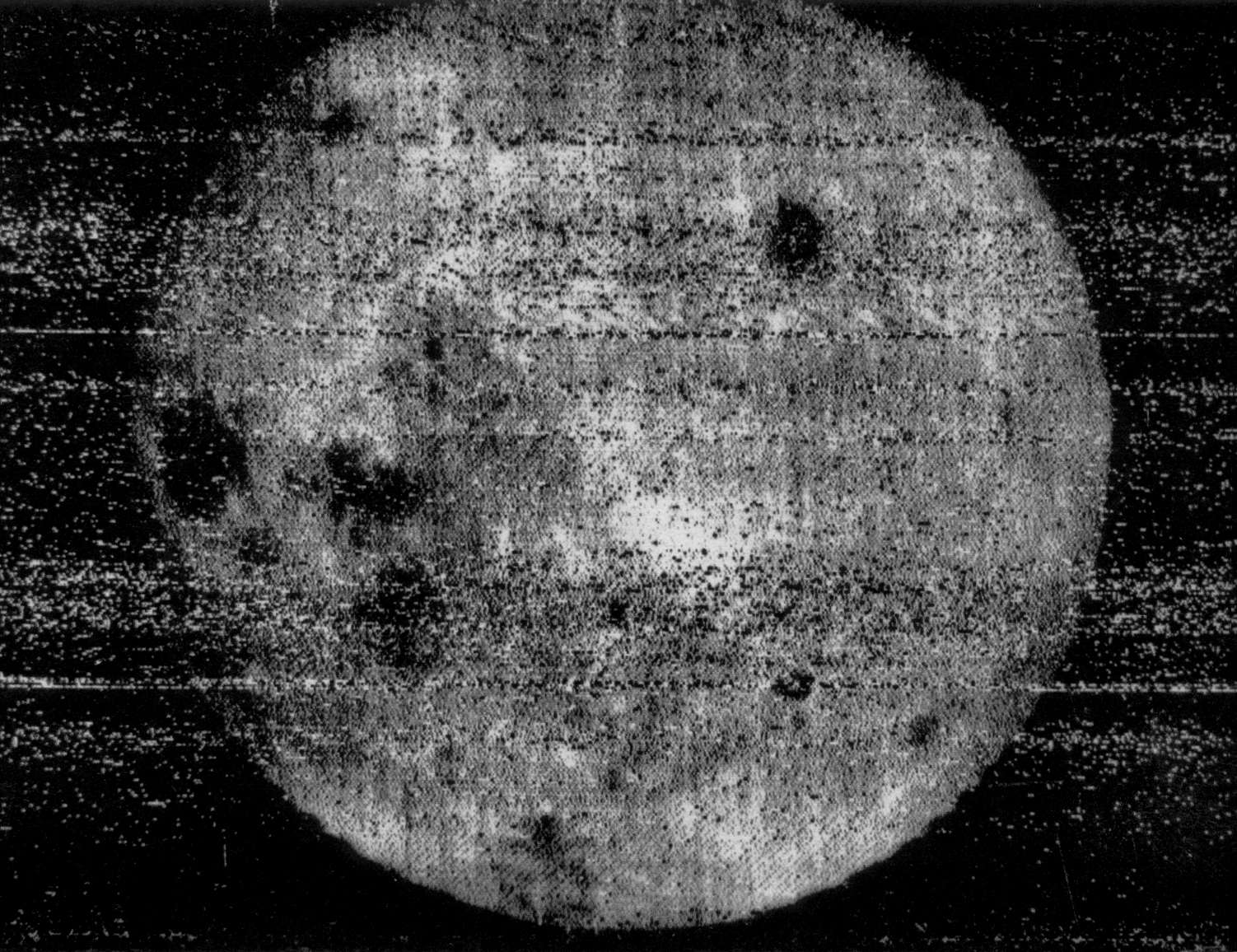
The first view returned by Luna 3 showed the far side of the Moon was very different from the near side, most noticeably in its lack of lunar maria (the dark areas)

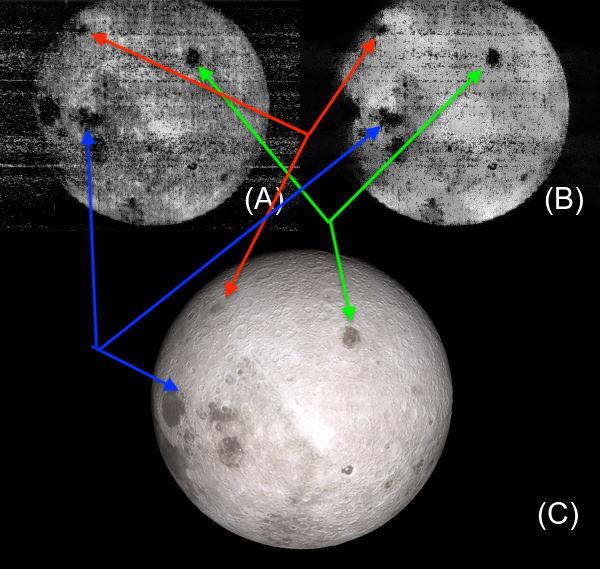
When the first image of the far side of the Moon (A) is restored using advanced noise-removal techniques (B) and compared to the later LRO mission from NASA (C) the important feature points are distinctly visible and a clear, one-to-one mapping of the visible feature points is noticeable.

The purpose of this experiment was to obtain photographs of the lunar surface as the spacecraft flew by the Moon. The imaging system was designated Yenisey-2 and consisted of a dual-lens camera AFA-E1, an automatic film processing unit, and a scanner. The lenses on the camera were a 200 mm focal length, f/5.6 aperture objective and a 500 mm, f/9.5 objective. The camera carried 40 frames of American-made temperature- and radiation-resistant 35mm isochrome film recovered by the Soviets from downed American Genetrix espionage balloons. The 200 mm objective could image the full disk of the Moon and the 500 mm could take an image of a region on the surface. The camera was fixed in the spacecraft and pointing was achieved by rotating the craft itself.

Luna 3 was the first successful three-axis stabilized spacecraft. During most of the mission, the spacecraft was spin stabilized, but for photography of the Moon, the spacecraft oriented one axis toward the Sun and then a photocell was used to detect the Moon and orient the cameras toward it. Detection of the Moon signaled the camera cover to open and the photography sequence to start automatically. The images alternated between both cameras during the sequence. After photography was complete, the film was moved to an on-board processor where it was developed, fixed, and dried. Commands from the Earth were then given to move the film into a flying-spot scanner where a spot produced by a cathode-ray tube was projected through the film onto a photomultiplier. The spot was scanned across the film and the photomultiplier converted the intensity of the light passing through the film into an electric signal which was transmitted to the Earth (via frequency-modulated analog video, similar to a facsimile). A frame could be scanned with a resolution of 1000 (horizontal) lines and the transmission could be done at a slow-scan television rate at large distances from the Earth and a faster rate at closer ranges.

The camera took 29 pictures over 40 minutes on 7 October 1959, from 03:30 UT to 04:10 UT at distances ranging from 63,500 km to 66,700 km above the surface, covering 70% of the lunar far side. Seventeen (some say twelve) of these frames were successfully transmitted back to the Earth (tracking stations in Crimea and Kamchatka), and six were published (frames numbered 26, 28, 29, 31, 32, and 35). They were the first photographs of the far hemisphere of the Moon.

The imaging system was developed by P.F. Bratslavets and I.A. Rosselevich at the Leningrad Scientific Research Institute for Television and the returned images were processed and analyzed by Iu.N. Lipskii and his team at the Sternberg Astronomical Institute. The camera AFA-E1 was developed and manufactured by the KMZ factory (Krasnogorskiy Mekhanicheskiy Zavod).

== Legacy ==
The images were analysed, and the first atlas of the far side of the Moon was published by the USSR Academy of Sciences on 6 November 1960. It included a catalog of 500 distinguished features of the landscape. In 1961, the first globe (1:13600000 scale) containing lunar features invisible from the Earth was released in the USSR, based on images from Luna 3. Features that were named include Mare Moscoviense and craters called after Konstantin Tsiolkovsky, Jules Verne, Marie Curie and Thomas Edison.

== See also ==
- Chang'e 4, a Chinese December 2018 mission for a robotic probe/lander combination that landed on the Moon's far side, near the lunar south pole (3 January 2019)
- Exploration of the Moon
- Far side of the Moon
- List of missions to the Moon
