= DH-1 (rocket) =

Fictional two-stage rocket design

The DH-1 was a circa-2005 reusable two-stage-to-orbit rocket concept proposed in the book The Rocket Company by Patrick J. G. Stiennon, David M. Hoerr, Doug Birkholz (AIAA, 2005). The concept is described in the expired US patent 5568901. The DH-1 was never built, and its manufacturing company, AM&M, is also fictional. The book highlighted and sought to solve many problems of building a cheap reusable vehicle via the DH-1 design.

The Rocket Company is a work of fiction, but the science, engineering and politics that underlies the design of the DH-1 are described as highly-feasible. The design is notable in that it attempts to avoid new or nonexistent wonder technologies, to rely on human rather than computer control, to consider the possible economics of a very small 5,000-pound (2,300 kg) payload capacity (including pilot), to make use of a 'pop up first stage' launch profile, to market the vehicle for 'space access' rather than 'cargo delivery', and to offer a business plan whose intention is to sell the DH-1 vehicles themselves, rather than payload space on a company launch vehicle, as is currently the norm.

== First stage ==
The first stage is cylindrical in shape, 25 ft wide (7.6 m) and 30 ft high (9.1 m). It has an empty weight of 40,000 pounds (18,000 kg), carries 168,000 pounds (76,000 kg) of methane and oxygen, and a gross lift-off weight (GLOW) of 209,000 pounds (95,000 kg), including the second stage. It is fitted with five RL-60 and 4 RL10 sustainer engines, and 4 small jet landing engines, all modified to burn methane. At launch it is mounted on four internal launch-rails fitted with pneumatic shock absorbers, rather than locked to the launch frame with explosive bolts. Allowing the DH-1 to rise as soon as thrust exceeds weight avoids sudden shock loads and allows it to settle back onto the launch frame in the event of critical engine failure in the first few meters of flight.

Flight is functionally similar to the DC-X. At launch all 9 rockets are fired until the DH-1 reaches 100,000 feet (~30 km). At that point the RL-60s are shut down and the sustainer engines push the rocket up to 200,000 ft (~60 km) where separation occurs. The first stage flight profile is almost entirely vertical, with only slight sideways motion to keep above the launch/landing area. The first stage then drops back to the launch site, experiencing reentry heating roughly comparable to the SR-71, releasing a drogue chute at 120,000 ft, and decelerating and landing propulsively with 30 seconds reserve fuel on the jet engines.

== Second stage ==
The second stage is cone shaped, 20 ft wide (6.1 m), 44 ft high (13 m), and cone angle of 11.5 degrees. It has an empty weight of 17,000 pounds (7,700 kg), carries 82,000 pounds (37,000 kg) of hydrogen and oxygen, and a gross weight of 99,000 pounds (45,000 kg) at separation. It is fitted with two RL-60 and a small reaction control system. At staging height the air is so thin the engines can be optimised for vacuum without performance penalty. The inter-tank section doubles as the flight and cargo cabin. Power is provided by batteries and a strip of solar panels that run around the top of the cabin. Reentry is base first and is protected by transpiration heatshield, before a parafoil is deployed and the upper stage glides down in a horizontal position to land on three legs; two extended from the base and one from the nosecone.

== Aircraft-like operations ==
A much desired goal for space launch is the ability to put material and people into orbit with the same reliability and comparative cost as commercial air transport. For reusable vehicles the desire is for a vehicle that operates like an aircraft, which can be reused by only refueling it. The Rocket Company takes the idea one step further, and proposes that the vehicles should be sold like commercial vehicles, under the same export rules as a Boeing 747.

Once purchased, the DH-1 would operate as a specialized aircraft that can be used as often or as rarely as the customer desires, similar to the SR-71, Air Force One, or a UAV. The customer would not be buying an ability to launch satellites so much as a complete space programme for less than $400M (including facilities and DH-1) and a yearly cost of under $100M.

== Reliability ==
The RL-60 rocket is a closed-cycle expander engine, and is a scaled-up version of the RL10, one of the most reliable engines ever built. Though this type of engine is not as capable of generating the same power as the SSME, it is much less complex and much more reliable. Expander cycle engines do not need computer controllers to merely function. The fuel coming out of the engine bell cooling system is also not much hotter than room temperature, and hence does not cause nearly so much damage as preburners do.

Current material technology is not up to building a single-stage vehicle that can go into orbit, and carry a useful payload, and return to earth in a condition to launch again. The DH-1 gets around this problem by splitting the task between the two stages, allowing both to operate safely within known material limits, and known operating methods. A DH-1–style vehicle can therefore be designed for reliability and safety, rather than absolute performance at the expense of those criteria.

== Financial considerations ==
With an estimated manufacturing cost of $65 million and a sale price of $250 million the development costs of ~$3 billion could be paid off with about 20 sales. Launch costs were estimated at $1M (launch often) to $100M (once per year) depending on how often the vehicle was operated, with launch facilities costing $100M and fitting inside a 1-mile circle. The Rocket Company asserts that globally such sales are possible. Potential clients are suggested as NASA, the USAF, NATO countries like UK, France, Germany and Japan, as well as private firms, like Virgin Galactic or Bigelow Aerospace.

The Rocket Company asserts that with a number of reliable vehicles competing in an open market, the price should eventually fall to close to the actual launch cost of under $200 per pound.

== Beyond LEO ==
The upper stage is designed to operate in space, and to be refueled there. Assuming the presence of a space station for storing the propellant, an orbital DH-1 could be refueled after 17 launches. Linking two such refueled stages nose to nose would get ~35,000 lb (16 tonnes) to the Lunar surface, the Martian surface, or geosynchronous orbit, and return to the station. Due to fuel requirements, the cost to these locations is 6 times greater than the cost to LEO.

Variants with a stretched cabin and a hinged nose have also been suggested. The former could be outfitted in orbit to carry people in comparative comfort on long duration flights, while the latter could be used to carry bulky cargo that would not fit through the normal cargo hatch. For interplanetary flights, the book suggested using one RL-60 modified to run on methane which was fitted with an engine bell extension, which was removable to allow aerobraking.
