= Advanced Low Volume Ramjet =

US Navy integrated rocket-ramjet technology demonstrator

ALVRJ being loaded onto an LTV A-7A Corsair II

The Advanced Low Volume Ramjet (ALVRJ) was an experimental integrated rocket-ramjet cruise missile technology demonstrator developed by Ling-Temco-Vought and Texaco inc. for the US Navy for use on air and sea based assets. Development took place in the late 1960s to early 1970s with its first flight in 1974.

== Development ==
The ALVRJ program was initiated by the Navy in 1968 under contract N0019-68-0605 with the purpose of demonstrating the flight characteristics and mission capability of an integrated rocket-ramjet missile. The missile was built around its integral booster, the low-volume ramjet propulsion system, which would activate after being launched by a solid rocket engine with a 5-second burn time. The ramjet would then repurpose the now empty rocket chamber as a ramjet combustion chamber using JP-5 fuel. Thus reducing the volume used for propulsion in the missile, hence: Advanced Low Volume Ramjet. The guidance system used on the ALVRJ was inertial with a proposed inertial/active radar homing package. In the six ALVRJ missiles built there was not a warhead present but rather a ballast that stabilized the missile and acted as a placeholder for the proposed high-explosive unitary warhead not completely dissimilar to the one in the AGM-78 Standard ARM.

== Operational history ==
Throughout the eight year lifespan of the program six Dynamic Test Vehicles (DTVs) (of which five were flown), plus ground testing equipment, were built to provide data for the improvement of the integrated rocket-ramjet system in the future. The first flight of the ALVRJ DTVs occurred in 1974. At the Program’s conclusion in 1976 all five flight tests resulted in a resounding success as the ALVRJ demonstrated a smooth transition from solid rocket-fueled engine thrust to ramjet thrust and stable cruise performance at both sea level and 35,000 ft (11,000 m), at speeds exceeding Mach 2.5 (1,918 mph, 3,087 km/h). In addition to this the missile demonstrated excellent controllability and satisfactory ramjet performance through lateral turns, pull-up, and nose-down maneuvers all with angles of attack expected in operations.

== General info ==
- First flight: 1974
- Retired: 1976
- No. built: 6
- No. flown: 5
- Launch platform: A-7A, A-7E, F-4N
  - (Proposed): Sea based assets

== Test vehicle specifications ==
- Length: 14.95 ft (4.56 m)
- Diameter: 1.25 ft (0.38 m)
- Wingspan: 3.31 ft (1.01 m)
- Weight: 1,500 lb (680 kg)
- Maximum speed:
  - At sea level: Mach 2.5 (1,918 mph, 3,087 km/h)
  - At 35,000 ft (11,000 m): Mach 3 (2,301 mph, 3,704 km/h)
- Maximum range (demonstrated):
  - At sea level: 28 nmi (32 mi, 52 km)
  - At 35,000 ft (11,000 m): 108 nmi (124 mi, 200 km)
- Service ceiling: >35,000 ft (11,000 m)
- Booster: Solid-fuel rocket
  - Burn time: 5 sec
- Sustainer: Ramjet
  - Fuel: JP-5
- Guidance: Inertial guidance
  - (Proposed): Inertial + Active Radar Homing (ARH)
- Warhead: Ballast for stability
  - (Proposed): High-explosive unitary warhead
