= IVF (disambiguation) =

IVF is in vitro fertilization, an assisted reproductive technology that involves fertilisation of an egg outside of the human body.

IVF may also refer to:

- Integrated Vehicle Fluids, a technique/system to extend the in orbit life of the ULA Advanced Cryogenic Evolved Stage (rocket).
- Inter-Varsity Fellowship or Universities and Colleges Christian Fellowship
- Intervertebral foramen
- Intravenous fluids (IV fluids) as intravenous therapy
- .ivf, the file extension for Indeo video files
- Irish Volunteer Force
