= MARC-60 =

Liquid-fuel cryogenic rocket engine

- Country of origin: Japan, United States of America
- Date: 1999
- Designer: Aerojet Rocketdyne, MHI
- Application: Upper stage engine
- Associated LV: Atlas V, Delta IV, H-IIA, SLS EUS
- Status: Development halted

Liquid-fuel engine
- Propellant: LOX/LH_{2}
- Mixture ratio: 5.40 ± 2%
- Cycle: Open expander cycle

Performance
- Thrust, vacuum: 266.7 kN (60,000 lbf)
- Throttle range: 75–100% ± 3%
- Specific impulse, vacuum: 462 s (4.53 km/s)
- Burn time: 800 s
- Restarts: 5 (7 after delivery)
- Gimbal range: 5°

Dimensions
- Length: 3.3 m (10.8 ft)
- Dry mass: 591 kg (1,302 lb)

The MARC-60 (Mitsubishi Aerojet Rocketdyne Collaboration), also known as MB-60, MB-XX, and RS-73, is a liquid-fuel cryogenic rocket engine designed as a collaborative effort by Japan's Mitsubishi Heavy Industries and US' Aerojet Rocketdyne. The engine burns cryogenic liquid oxygen and liquid hydrogen in an open expander cycle, driving the turbopumps with waste heat from the main combustion process.

== Description ==
The MB-XX program shared the development duties of the engines between Boeing's Rocketdyne division (now Aerojet Rocketdyne) and the Japanese Mitsubishi Heavy Industries. Under the agreement, Boeing develops the LOX and LH_{2} turbopumps and the nozzle, while MHI develops the thrust chamber assembly (TCA), control systems, gimbal bearing, heat exchanger, and ducts. The TCA of the engine consists of the main combustion chamber, the regeneratively cooled portion of the nozzle, the injector, and the ignition system.

Under the MB-XX program two engines were developed: the MARC-60 (MB-60) and the MB-35. Please note that the below table uses specifications as listed in 2003, and the MARC-60 engine has since then evolved.

Comparison between the MB-60 and MB-35 in 2003
	MB-35	MB-60 (outdated)
Engine cycle	Open expander (bleed)	Open expander (bleed)
Propellants	LOX/LH_{2}	LOX/LH_{2}
Vacuum thrust	156 kN (35,000 lbf)	267 kN (60,000 lbf)
Vacuum specific impulse	468 s (4.59 km/s)	467 s (4.58 km/s)
Chamber pressure	103 bar (1,500 psia)	134 bar (1,950 psia)
Mixture ratio (O/F)	5.8	5.8
Weight	345 kg (760 lb)	590 kg (1,300 lb)
Area ratio	313	300
Length stowed/extended (Note: The MB-35 features a stowed nozzle extension that is extended during flight, similar to the one found on the RL10)	2.21 m/3.05 m (87 in/120 in)	3.3 m (130 in)
Restarts	Multiple	Multiple

== History ==
The MARC-60's (then MB-60) development program was announced on 14 February 2000 by Boeing's Rocketdyne division and Japan's Mitsubishi Heavy Industries, as a part of the MB-XX family of cryogenic upper stage rocket engines. The aim of the MB-XX program was to develop an engine with "robust operating margins, high reliability, increased thrust, and high specific impulse at an affordable cost". The MB-XX family of engines was intended to be used on new or upgraded upper stages of Boeing's Delta IV and MHI's H-IIA families of launch vehicles. Potential applications also included Lockheed Martin's Atlas V. Both Delta IV and Atlas V are now operated by United Launch Alliance.

Development of the MB-XX family of engines was started in early 1999. From 2000 to 2001, market forces drove the focus of the MB-XX program from the 267 kN (60,000 lbf) MB-60 to the 156 kN (35,000 lbf) MB-35. The MB-35 was not a new design, instead the existing MB-60 design was tuned to operate at the lower thrust level. The MB-35 was designed to be a modern, drop-in replacement for the Aerojet Rocketdyne RL10.

Component-level testing of the MB-XX demonstrator was completed in 2004, and a system-level demonstrator engine was successfully hot-fired in September 2005.

In 2013, NASA was evaluating MARC-60 as the engine of choice for the Space Launch System's Exploration Upper Stage (EUS). The study explored the possibility of utilizing two MARC-60 engines in place of four RL10 engines, as well as the possibility of the stage using a single J-2X engine. Under the plan, the engine's control unit would have been provided by NASA. The proposal also resulted in the engine being renamed to MARC-60, as Rocketdyne had changed hands multiple times after the MB-60's (Mitsubishi Boeing-Rocketdyne) inception in 1999. In 2016, NASA announced that the Exploration Upper Stage (EUS) would be powered by four RL10C-3 engines, dropping both MARC-60 and J-2X.

== See also ==
- RL60, a LOX/LH_{2} expander cycle engine of same thrust and weight class
- RL10, the closed expander cycle LOX/LH_{2} engine that was supposed to be replaced by MB-35, the down-scaled version of MARC-60
