= Centaur (rocket stage) =

Family of rocket stages which can be used as a space tug

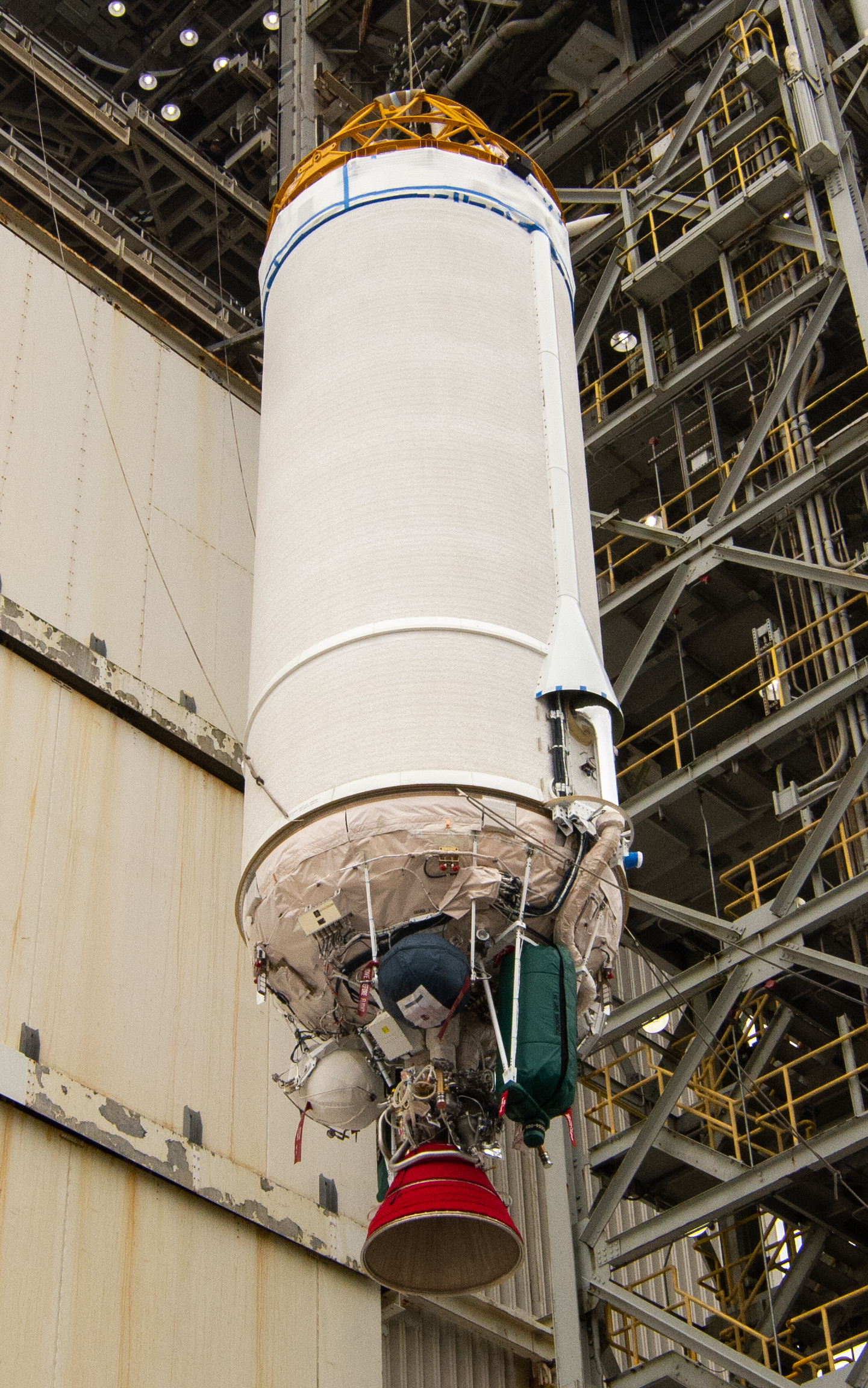
- A single-engine Centaur III being raised for mating to an Atlas V rocket
- Manufacturer: United Launch Alliance
- Used on: Current Atlas V: Centaur III Vulcan: Centaur V Historical Atlas-Centaur Saturn I Titan III Titan IV Atlas II Atlas III Shuttle-Centaur (not flown) Planned Space Launch System

Associated stages
- Derivatives: Advanced Cryogenic Evolved Stage (cancelled, not flown)

Launch history
- Status: Active
- Total launches: 285 as of July 2026
- Successes (stage only): 266
- Failed: 15
- Lower stage failed: 4
- First flight: May 9, 1962; 64 years ago

Centaur III
- Height: 12.68 m (499 in)
- Diameter: 3.05 m (120 in)
- Empty mass: 2,247 kg (4,954 lb), single engine 2,462 kg (5,428 lb), dual engine
- Propellant mass: 20,830 kg (45,920 lb)
- Powered by: 1 × RL10A, 2 × RL10A or 1 × RL10C
- Maximum thrust: 99.2 kN (22,300 lbf), per engine
- Specific impulse: 450.5 seconds (4.418 km/s)
- Burn time: 904 seconds
- Propellant: LOX / LH_{2}

Centaur V
- Height: CV-L: 10.66 m (35 ft); CV-HE: 12.6 m (41 ft); CV-E: ~16.9 m (55 ft)
- Diameter: 5.4 m (17.7 ft)
- Propellant mass: CV-L: 39,000 kg (85,000 lb); CV-HE: 54,000 kg (120,000 lb); CV-E: ~81,600 kilograms (180,000 lb)
- Powered by: 2 × RL10C; 2 × RL10E (planned upgrade)
- Maximum thrust: RL10C: 203.6 kN (45,780 lb_{f}); RL10E: 214.6 kN (48,240 lb_{f})
- Specific impulse: RL10C: 453.8 s (4.450 km/s); RL10E: 460.9 s (4.520 km/s)
- Burn time: CV-HE: 1,077 seconds
- Propellant: LOX / LH_{2}

The Centaur is a family of rocket-propelled upper stages that has been in use since 1962. It is currently produced by United Launch Alliance (ULA) in two main versions. The 3.05 m (10 ft) diameter Centaur III (also known as the Common Centaur) serves as the second stage of the retiring Atlas V rocket, and the 5.4 m (17.7 ft) diameter Centaur V is used as the second stage of the Vulcan Centaur rocket. Centaur was the first rocket stage to use hydrolox propellant—liquid hydrogen (LH_{2}) and liquid oxygen (LOX)—a high-energy combination well suited for upper stages but difficult to handle because both propellants must be stored at extremely low cryogenic temperatures.

== Characteristics ==
Centaur stages are built around stainless steel or Inconel 718 pressure-stabilized balloon propellant tanks with 0.51 mm (0.020 in) thick walls. It can lift payloads of up to 19,000 kg (42,000 lb). The thin tank walls minimize mass, maximizing overall stage performance.

A common bulkhead separates the LOX and LH_{2} tanks, further reducing weight. The bulkhead consists of two stainless steel skins separated by a fiberglass honeycomb, which limits heat transfer between the extremely cold LH_{2} and the comparatively warmer LOX.

The main propulsion system consists of one or two RL10 engines made by Aerojet Rocketdyne. The stage is capable of multiple restarts, constrained by propellant supply, orbital lifetime, and mission requirements. In combination with insulation on the propellant tanks, this enables Centaur to perform multi-hour coast phases and multiple engine burns for complex orbital insertions.

The stage is equipped with a reaction control system (RCS), which also provides ullage.

On the Centaur III the RCS consists of twenty hydrazine monopropellant thrusters, arranged in two two-thruster pods and four four-thruster pods. Approximately 150 kg (340 lb) of hydrazine is stored in two bladder tanks and fed to the thrusters by pressurized helium, which also supports some main engine functions.

On some Centaur V stages, the hydrazine system is replaced with hydrolox thrusters supplied by gaseous propellants from the main tanks.

== Current versions ==
As of 2025, two Centaur variants are in use: Centaur III on Atlas V, and Centaur V on Vulcan Centaur. All of the many other Centaur variants have been retired.

=== Centaur III/Common Centaur ===
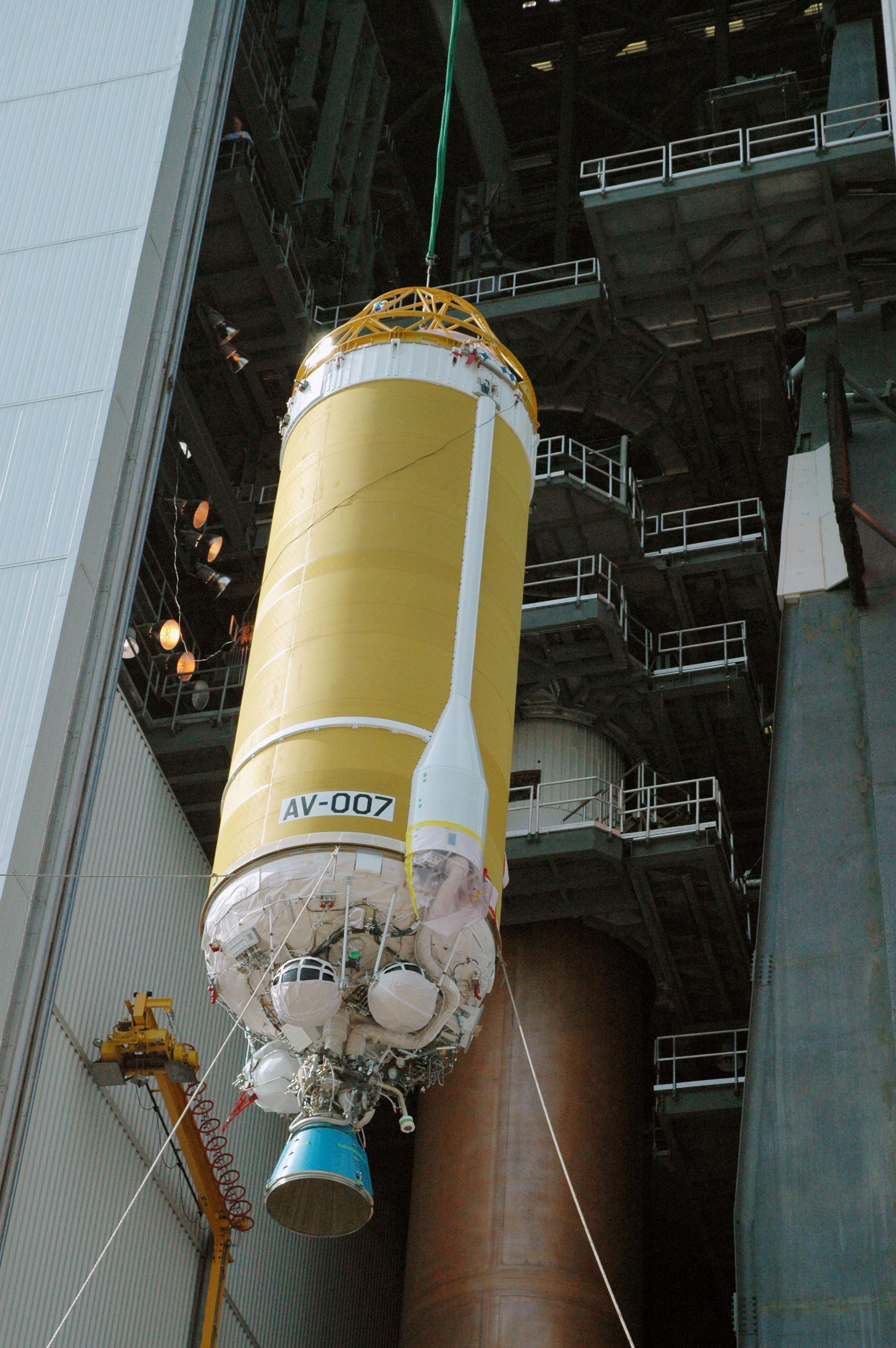
Single Engine Centaur (SEC) stage

Common Centaur is the upper stage of the Atlas V rocket. Earlier Common Centaurs were propelled by the RL10A-4-2 version of the RL10. From 2014 to 2026, Common Centaur flew with the RL10C-1 engine, which was shared with the Delta Cryogenic Second Stage, to reduce costs. The Dual Engine Centaur (DEC) configuration continues to use the smaller RL10A-4-2 to accommodate two engines in the available space.

The Atlas V could fly in multiple configurations, but only one affected the way Centaur integrates with the booster and fairing: the 5.4 m (18 ft) diameter Atlas V payload fairing attached to the booster and encapsulated the upper stage and payload, routing fairing-induced aerodynamic loads into the booster. If the 4 m (13 ft) diameter payload fairing was used, the attachment point was at the top (forward end) of Centaur, routing loads through the Centaur tank structure.

The latest Common Centaurs can accommodate secondary payloads using an Aft Bulkhead Carrier attached to the engine end of the stage.

==== Single Engine Centaur (SEC) ====
Most payloads launched on Single Engine Centaur (SEC) with one RL10. This was the variant for all normal flights of the Atlas V (indicated by the last digit of the naming system, for example Atlas V 421). It made its final flight on 2 July 2026.

==== Dual Engine Centaur (DEC) ====
A dual engine variant with two RL10 engines is available, but only for launching the CST-100 Starliner crewed spacecraft. The higher thrust of two engines allows a gentler ascent with more horizontal velocity and less vertical velocity, which reduces deceleration to survivable levels in the event of a launch abort and ballistic reentry occurring at any point in the flight.

=== Centaur V ===
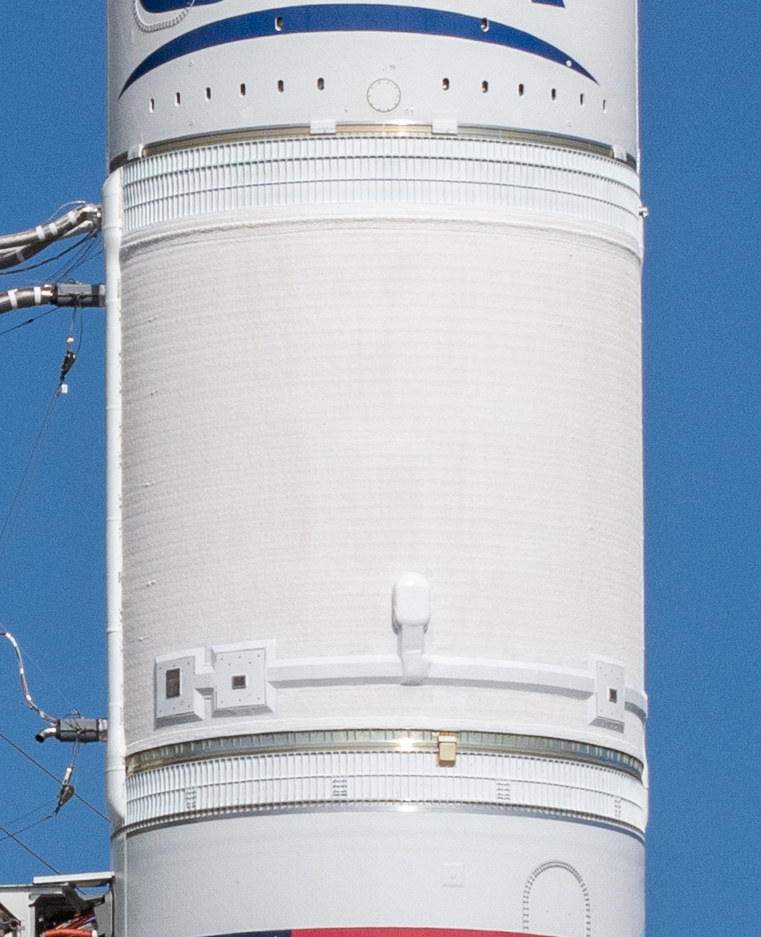
Centaur V stage on Vulcan Centaur rocket carrying Peregrine lunar lander

Centaur V is the upper stage of the Vulcan launch vehicle developed by United Launch Alliance (ULA) beginning in 2014 to meet the requirements of the National Security Space Launch (NSSL) program.

==== Development ====
ULA initially intended the Centaur V, an upgraded version of the Common Centaur, to only be used on an interim basis until a transition to the Advanced Cryogenic Evolved Stage (ACES) planned after the first few years of flights.

In late 2017, the company began development of Centaur V by accelerating elements of the ACES design, including a 5.4 meters (17.7 ft) diameter and advanced insulation. The Integrated Vehicle Fluids (IVF) system, which had been intended to extend on-orbit lifetime from hours to weeks, was omitted.

Centaur V was designed to provide higher performance than the Common Centaur, fulfilling NSSL requirements and supporting the planned retirement of the Atlas V and Delta IV Heavy families. The stage was officially named Vulcan Centaur in March 2018, and in May 2018 ULA selected Aerojet Rocketdyne's RL10 engine over Blue Origin's BE-3. Each Centaur V uses two RL10 engines.

In September 2020, ULA confirmed that ACES would no longer be developed and that Centaur V would remain Vulcan's upper stage. The company said that the initial versions of the Centaur V offers 40% more endurance and 250% more energy than the Common Centaur.

Vulcan launched successfully on January 8, 2024, with Centaur V performing as planned on its maiden flight.

Starting in late 2025, ULA plans to upgrade the stage with the RL10E engine, featuring a fixed nozzle extension and modest improvements in thrust and specific impulse, offering minor improvements to payload capacities.

In February 2026, NASA announced changes to the SLS program including a plans to develop a "Standardized Block 1 Configuration" alongside a rendering that appears to show an SLS variant where the Interim Cryogenic Propulsion Stage (ICPS) is replaced by a Centaur V.

==== CV-L ====
During the Vulcan Cert-2 mission broadcast on October 4, 2024, ULA announced a "LEO Optimized Centaur" variant, later designated CV-L, scheduled to debut in 2025. CV-L is 1.94 m (6 ft 4 in) shorter than the baseline Centaur V, which was redesignated CV-HE (Centaur V High Energy). Unlike CV-HE, which uses a hydrolox RCS, CV-L returns to using a simpler hydrazine monopropellant RCS.

==== ACES revival ====
On August 28, 2025, in an infographic by ULA posted by Tory Bruno, a variant of Centaur V was referred as "ACES", this time standing for "Advanced Centaur Endurance Stage". Few details were provided about this updated ACES concept, other than a mention of "Smart Propulsion", which was not further explained. Previously, Bruno has suggested that future upper stages could offer up to 600% more endurance than the Common Centaur.

==== Use with Space Launch System ====
In February 2026, NASA announced that it would pursue the use of a commercially developed upper stage for the Space Launch System (SLS) rocket rather than continue development of the purpose-built Exploration Upper Stage. The following month, NASA selected the Centaur V. That October, ULA announced they would be pursuing a new, lengthened variant of the Centaur V for the SLS, the Centaur V Exploration, made of Inconel 718 and extended by roughly 5 m (16 ft) to accommodate 81,600 kilograms (179,900 lb) of propellant or 50% more than the CV-HE. The stage is expected to offer slightly improved performance over the Interim Cryogenic Propulsion Stage used on SLS missions for Artemis I, II, and IV, which is based on ULA's earlier Delta Cryogenic Second Stage.

=== Current engines ===
Centaur engines have evolved over time, and three versions (RL10A-4-2, RL10C-1 and RL10C-1-1) are in use as of 2024 (see table below). All versions utilize liquid hydrogen and liquid oxygen.

Centaur engines
Engine	Upper Stage	Dry mass	Thrust	Specific impulse, vac.	Length	Diameter	Ref
RL10A-4-2	Centaur III	168 kg (370 lb)	99.1 kN (22,300 lbf)	451 s (4.42 km/s)	2.29 m (7 ft 6 in)	1.17 m (3 ft 10 in)	
RL10C-1	Centaur III (SEC)	190 kg (420 lb)	101.8 kN (22,900 lbf)	449.7 s (4.410 km/s)	2.12 m (6 ft 11 in)	1.45 m (4 ft 9 in)	
RL10C-1-1	Centaur V	188 kg (414 lb)	106 kN (24,000 lbf)	453.8 s (4.450 km/s)	2.46 m (8 ft 1 in)	1.57 m (5 ft 2 in)	
RL10E-1	Centaur V	230 kg (510 lb)	107.3 kN (24,120 lbf)	460.9 s (4.520 km/s)	3.312 m (10 ft 10.4 in)	1.872 m (6 ft 1.7 in)	

== History ==
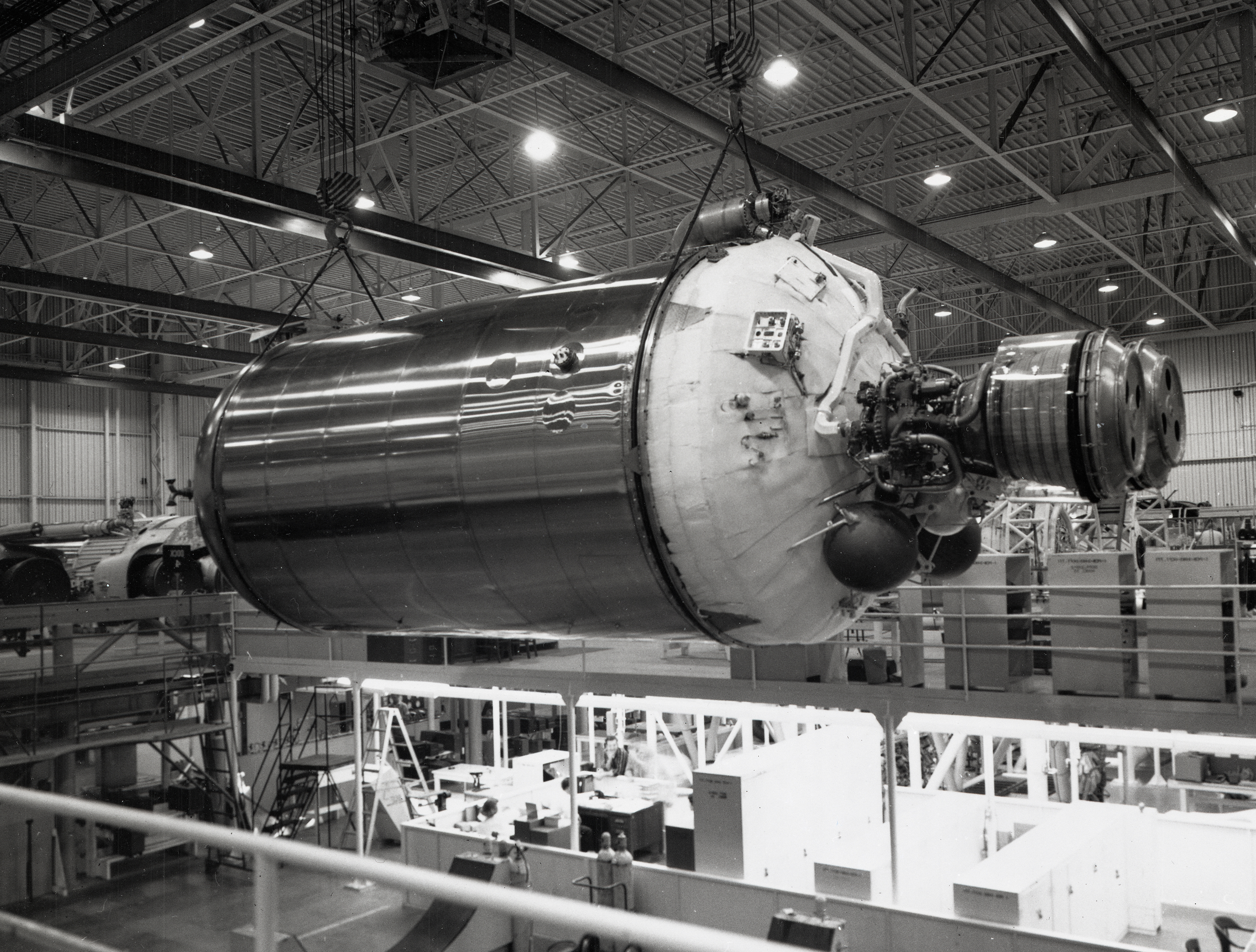
Centaur stage during assembly at General Dynamics, 1962

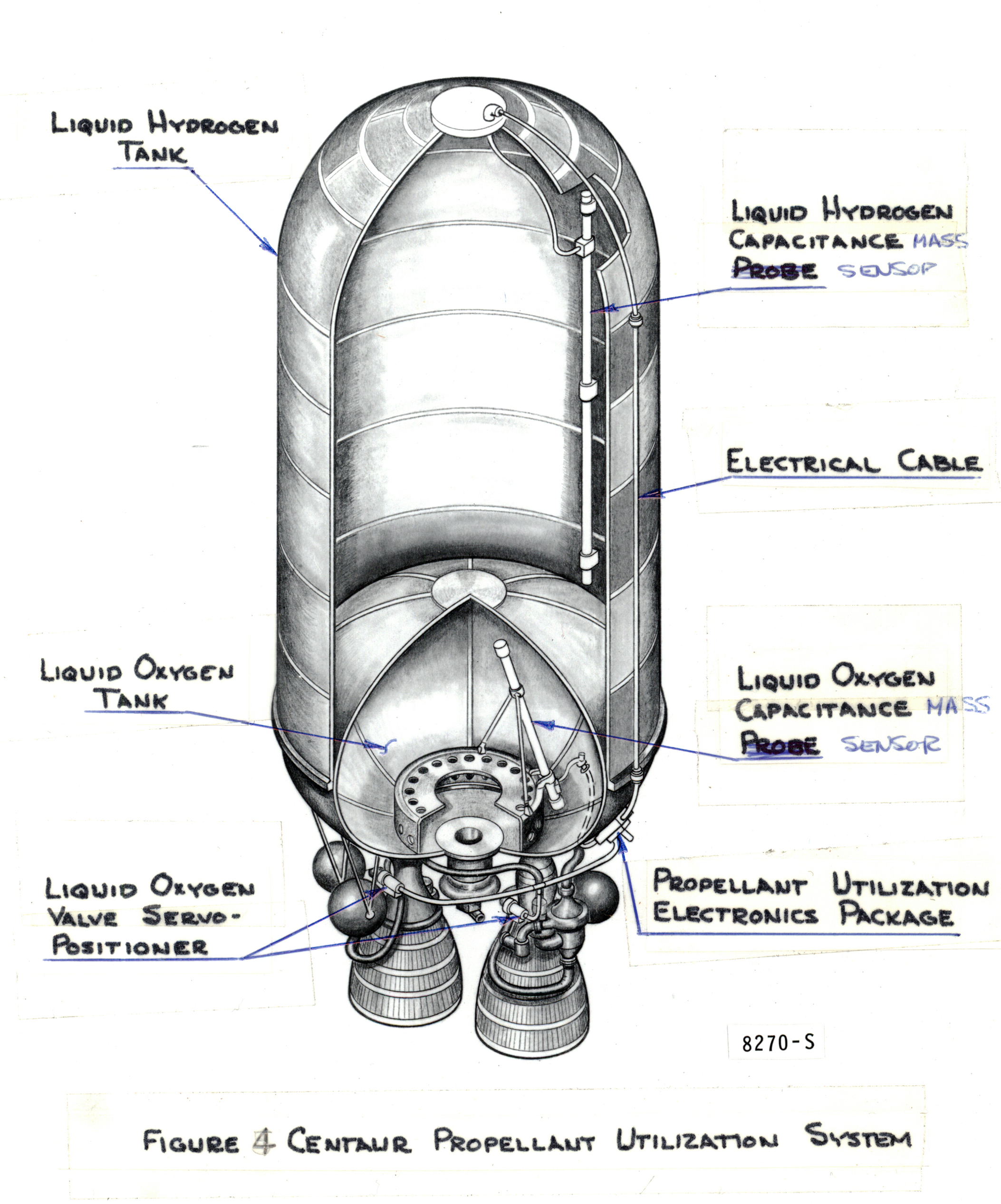
Diagram of the Centaur stage tank

The Centaur concept originated in 1956 when the Convair division of General Dynamics began studying a liquid hydrogen fueled upper stage. The ensuing project began in 1958 as a joint venture among Convair, the Advanced Research Projects Agency (ARPA), and the U.S. Air Force. In 1959, NASA assumed ARPA's role. Centaur initially flew as the upper stage of the Atlas-Centaur launch vehicle, encountering a number of early developmental issues due to the pioneering nature of the effort and the use of liquid hydrogen. In 1994 General Dynamics sold their Space Systems division to Lockheed-Martin.

=== Centaur A-D (Atlas) ===
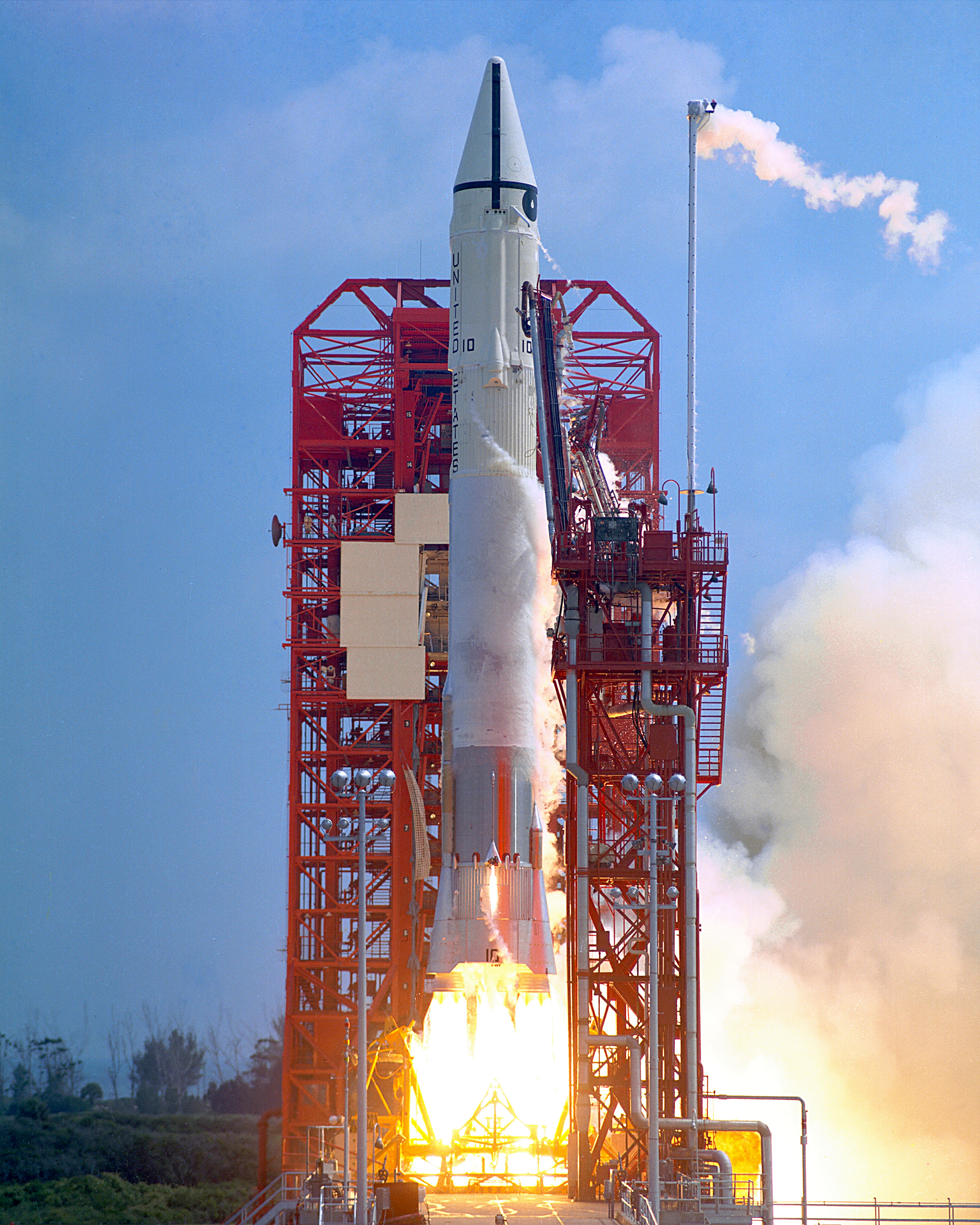
An Atlas-Centaur rocket (Centaur D stage) launches Surveyor 1

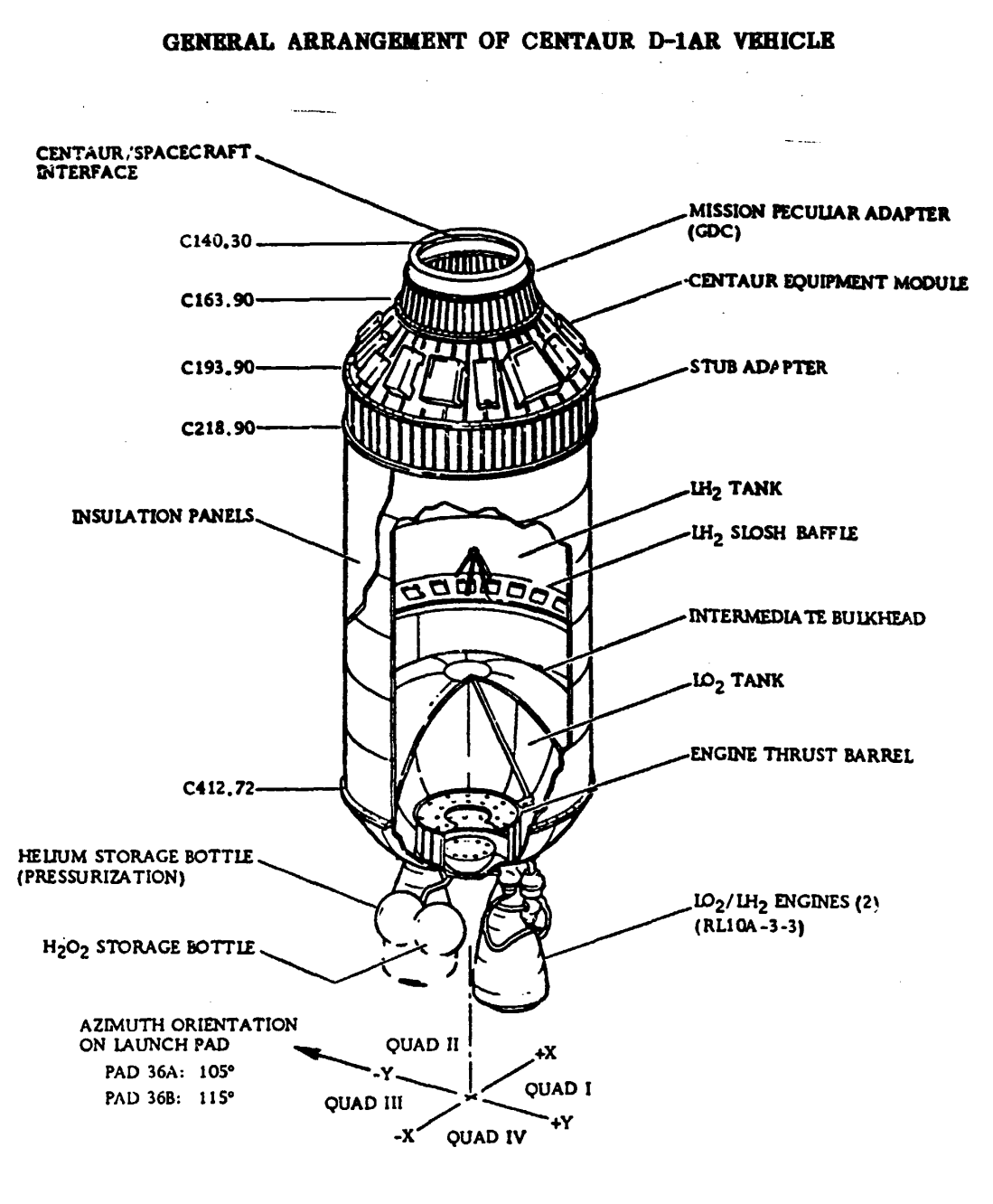
Centaur D1-AR diagram

The Centaur was originally developed for use with the Atlas launch vehicle family. Known in early planning as the 'high-energy upper stage', the choice of the mythological Centaur as a namesake was intended to represent the combination of the brute force of the Atlas booster and finesse of the upper stage.

Initial Atlas-Centaur launches used developmental versions, labeled Centaur-A through -C. The only Centaur-A launch on 8 May 1962 ended in an explosion 54 seconds after liftoff when insulation panels on the Centaur separated early, causing the LH_{2} tank to overheat and rupture. This version was powered by two RL10A-1 engines.

After extensive redesigns, the only Centaur-B flight on 26 November 1963 was successful. This version was powered by two RL10A-3 engines. Centaur-C flew three times between 1964 and 1965, with two failures and one launch declared successful although the Centaur failed to restart. This version was also powered by two RL10A-3 engines.

Centaur-D was the first version to enter operational service in 1965, with fifty-six launches. It was powered by two RL10A-3-1 or RL10A-3-3 engines.

On 30 May 1966, an Atlas-Centaur boosted the first Surveyor lander towards the Moon. This was followed by six more Surveyor launches over the next two years, with the Atlas-Centaur performing as expected. The Surveyor program demonstrated the feasibility of reigniting a hydrogen engine in space and provided information on the behavior of LH_{2} in space.

By the 1970s, Centaur was fully mature and had become the standard rocket stage for launching larger civilian payloads into high Earth orbit, also replacing the Atlas-Agena vehicle for NASA planetary probes.

An updated version, called Centaur-D1A (powered by RL10A-3-3 engines), was used on the Atlas-SLV3D came into use during the 1970s.

The Centaur-D1AR was used for the Atlas-SLV3D and Atlas G came into use during the 1970s and 1980s.

By the end of 1989, Centaur-D had been used as the upper stage for 63 Atlas rocket launches, 55 of which were successful.

=== Saturn I S-V ===
Saturn S-V stage illustration

The Saturn I was designed to fly with a S-V third stage to enable payloads to go beyond low Earth orbit (LEO). The S-V stage was intended to be powered by two RL10A-1 engines burning liquid hydrogen as fuel and liquid oxygen as oxidizer. The S-V stage was flown four times on missions SA-1 through SA-4, all four of these missions had the S-V's tanks filled with water to be used a ballast during launch. The stage was not flown in an active configuration.

=== Centaur D-1T (Titan III) ===
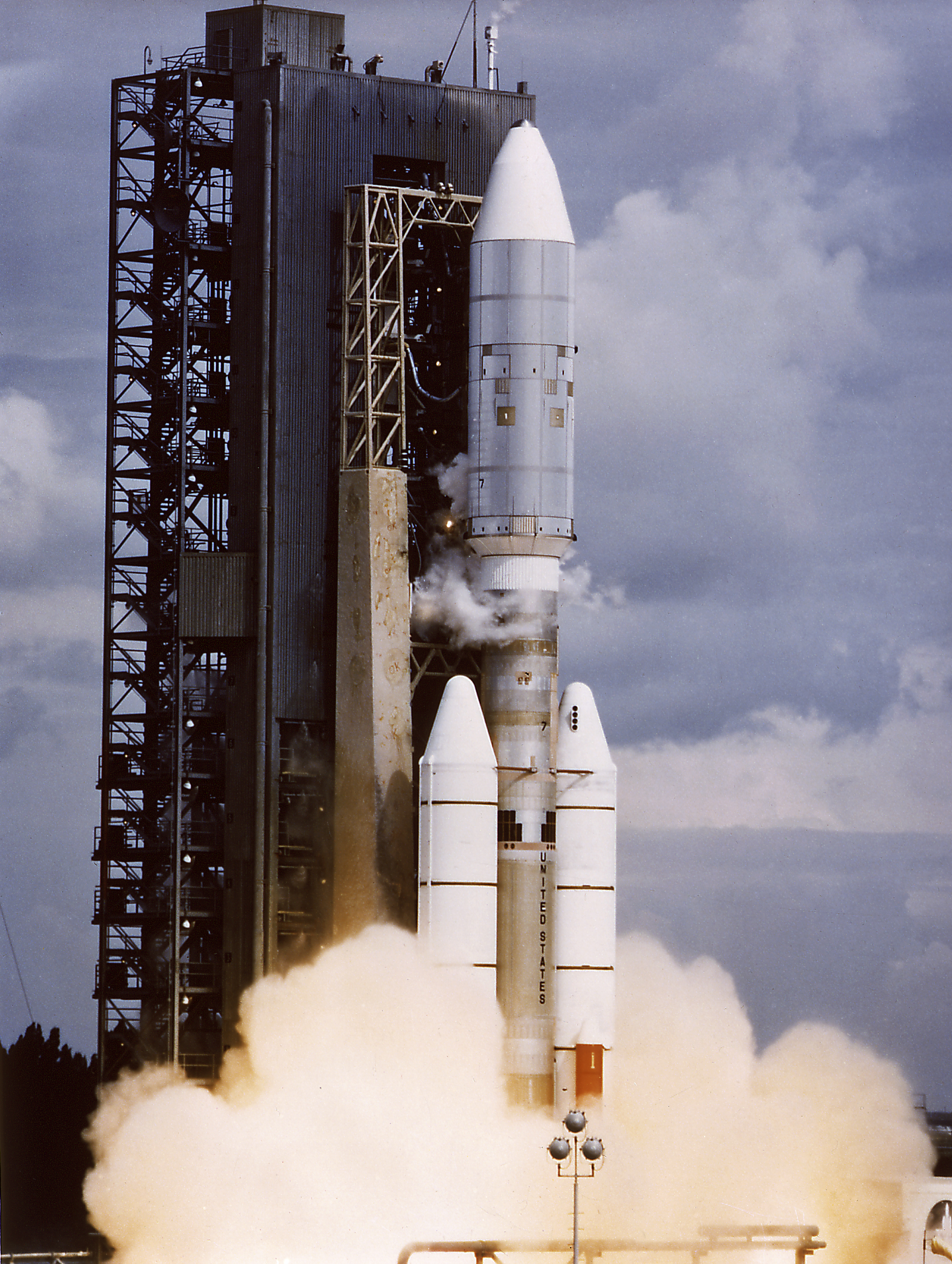
A Titan IIIE-Centaur rocket (Centaur D-1T stage) launches Voyager 2

The Centaur D-1T (powered by RL10A-3-3 engines) was an improved version for use on the far more powerful Titan III booster in the 1970s, with the first launch of the resulting Titan IIIE in 1974. The Titan IIIE more than tripled the payload capacity of Atlas-Centaur, and incorporated improved thermal insulation, allowing an orbital lifespan of up to five hours, an increase over the 30 minutes of the Atlas-Centaur.

The first launch of Titan IIIE in February 1974 was unsuccessful, with the loss of the Space Plasma High Voltage Experiment (SPHINX) and a mockup of the Viking probe. It was eventually determined that Centaur's engines had ingested an incorrectly installed clip from the oxygen tank.

The next Titan-Centaurs launched Helios 1, Viking 1, Viking 2, Helios 2, Voyager 1, and Voyager 2. The Titan booster used to launch Voyager 1 had a hardware problem that caused a premature shutdown, which the Centaur stage detected and successfully compensated for. Centaur ended its burn with less than 4 seconds of fuel remaining.

==== Centaur D-1T specifications ====
The Centaur D-1T had the following general specifications:

- Diameter: 3.0 m (10 ft); 4.3 m (14 ft) with the Centaur standard shroud (CSS)
- Length: 9.6 m (31.5 ft)
- Inert mass: 1,827 kg (4,028 lb)
- Fuel: Liquid hydrogen
- Oxidizer: Liquid oxygen
- Fuel and oxidizer mass: 13,490 kg (29,750 lb)
- Guidance: Inertial
- Thrust: 2 x 67,000 N (15,000 lbf)
- Burn Capability: 3 to 4 burns
- Engine: 2 x RL10A-3-3
- Engine start: Restartable
- Attitude control: 4 x 27 N (6 lbf) thrusters

=== Shuttle-Centaur ===
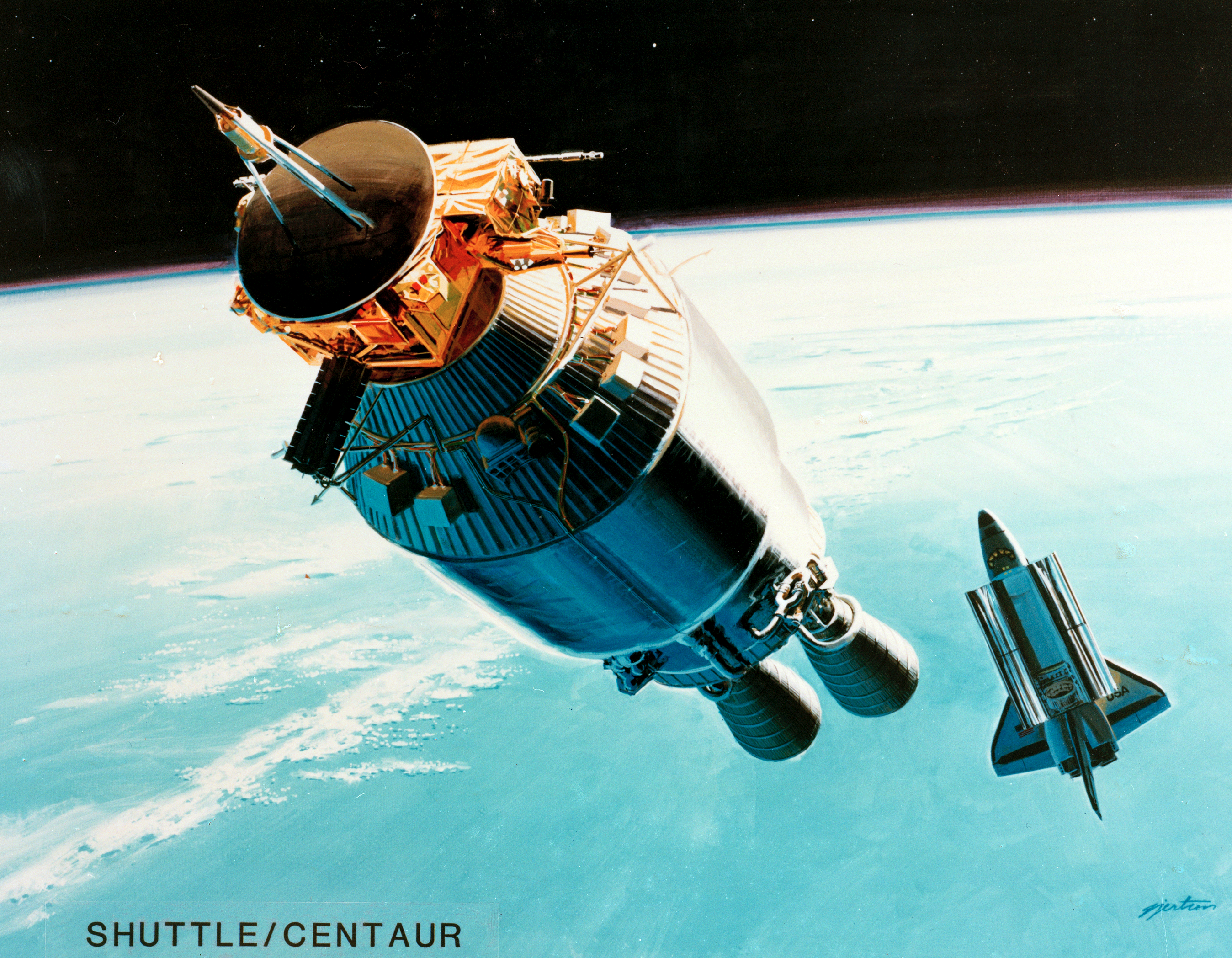
Illustration of Shuttle-Centaur G‑Prime with Ulysses

Shuttle-Centaur was a proposed Space Shuttle upper stage. To enable its installation in shuttle payload bays, the diameter of the Centaur's hydrogen tank was increased to 4.3 m (14 ft), with the LOX tank diameter remaining at 3.0 m (10 ft). Two variants were proposed: Centaur G‑Prime, which was planned to launch the Galileo and Ulysses robotic probes, and Centaur G, a shortened version, reduced in length from approximately 9.1 to 6.1 m (30 to 20 ft), planned for U.S. DoD payloads and the Magellan Venus probe.

After the Space Shuttle Challenger disaster, just months before the Shuttle-Centaur had been scheduled to fly, NASA concluded that it was too risky to fly the Centaur on the Shuttle. The probes were launched with the much less powerful solid-fueled Inertial Upper Stage, with Galileo needing multiple gravitational assists from Venus and Earth to reach Jupiter.

=== Centaur T (Titan IV) ===
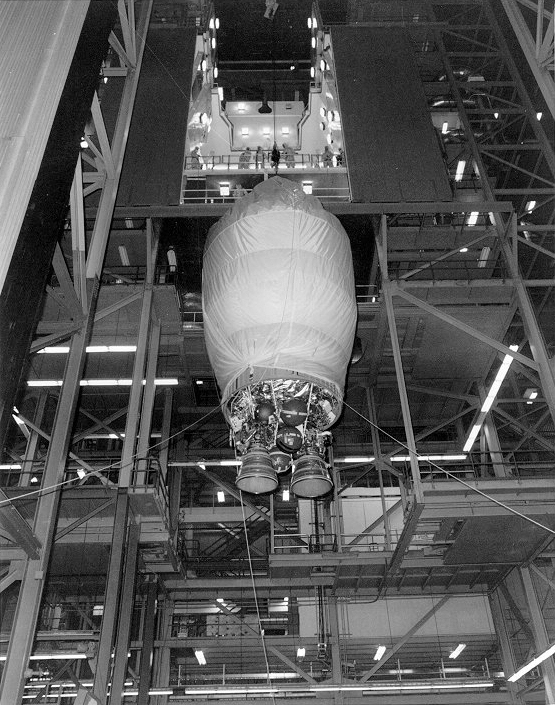
Centaur-T stage of a Titan IV rocket

The capability gap left by the termination of the Shuttle-Centaur program was filled by a new launch vehicle, the Titan IV. The 401A/B versions used a Centaur upper stage with a 4.3-meter (14 ft) diameter hydrogen tank. In the Titan 401A version, a Centaur-T was launched nine times between 1994 and 1998. The 1997 Cassini-Huygens Saturn probe was the first flight of the Titan 401B, with an additional six launches wrapping up in 2003 including one SRB failure.

=== Centaur I (Atlas I) ===
The upper stage of the Atlas I was the Centaur I stage, derived from earlier models of Centaur that also flew atop Atlas boosters. Centaur I featured two RL10A-3A engines burning liquid hydrogen and liquid oxygen, making the stage extremely efficient. To help slow the boiloff of liquid hydrogen in the tanks, Centaur featured fiberglass insulation panels that were jettisoned 25 seconds after the first stage booster engines were jettisoned. Centaur I was the last version of the stage to feature separating insulation panels.

=== Centaur II (Atlas II/III) ===
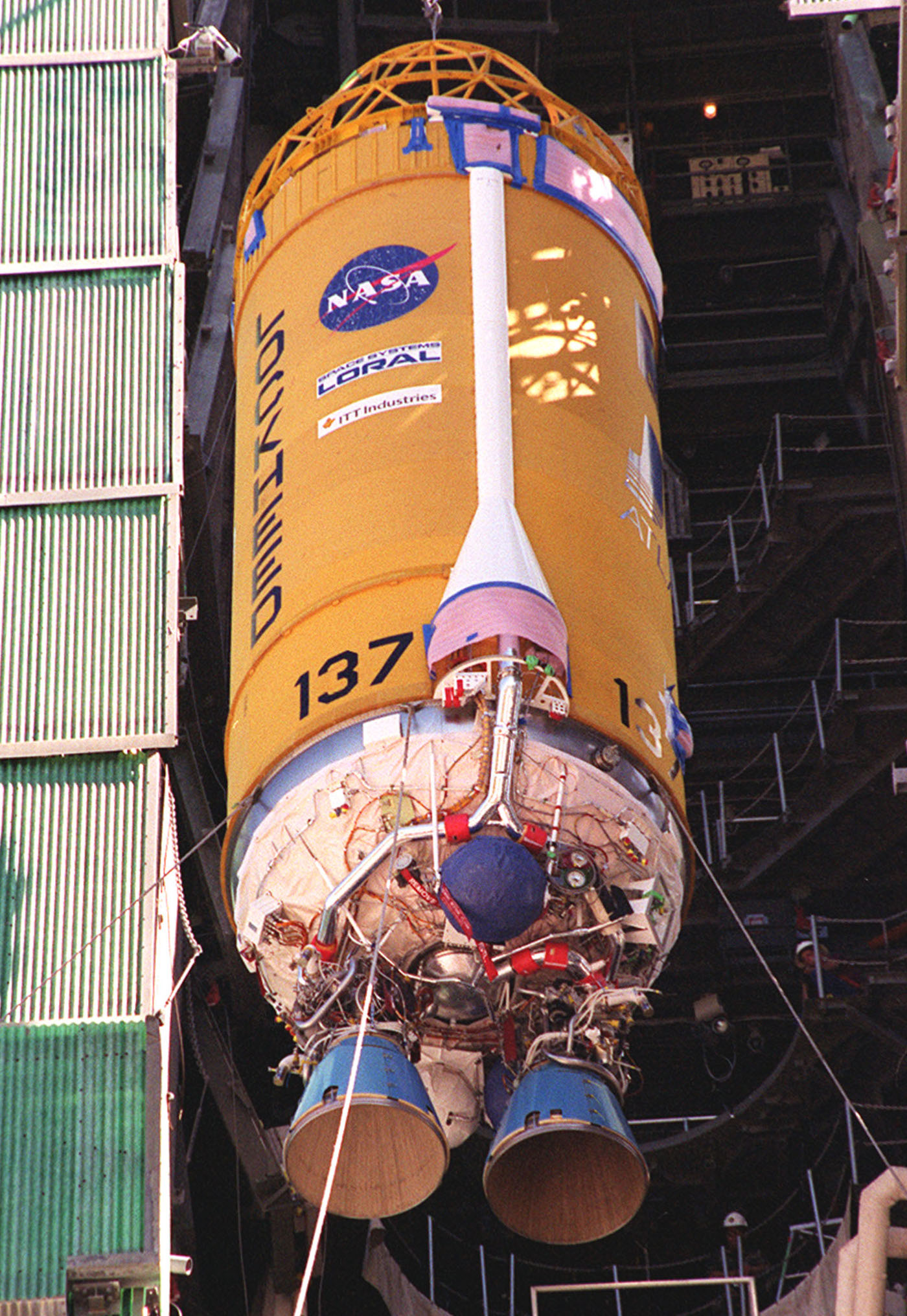
Centaur-2A second stage of an Atlas IIA rocket

Centaur II was initially developed for use on the Atlas II series of rockets. Centaur II also flew on the initial Atlas IIIA launches.

=== Centaur III/Common Centaur (Atlas III/V) ===
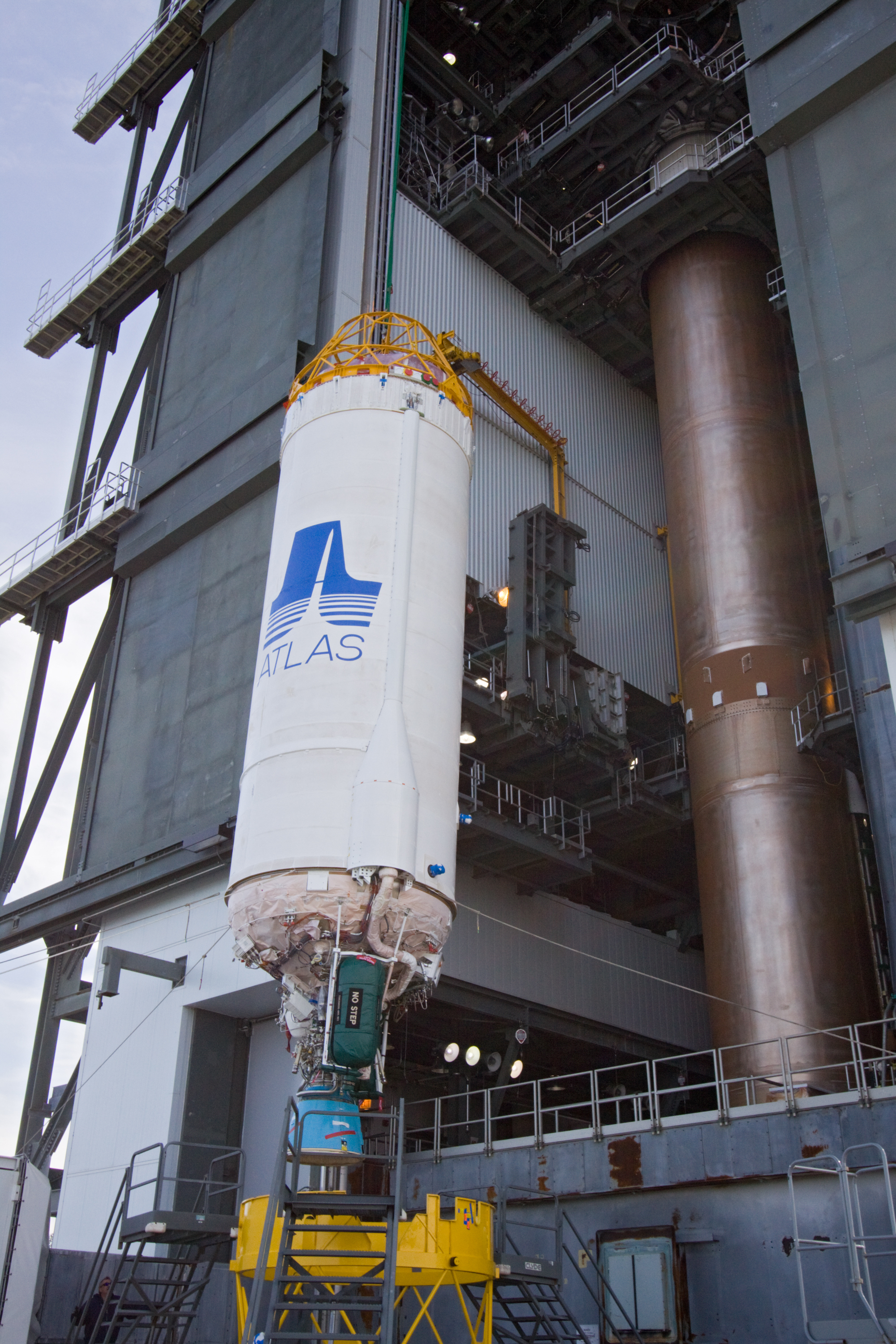
Common Centaur upper stage for an Atlas V

Atlas IIIB introduced the Common Centaur, a longer and initially dual engine Centaur II.

==== Centaur III specifications ====
Source: Atlas V551 specifications, as of 2015.

- Diameter: 3.05 m (10 ft)
- Length: 12.68 m (42 ft)
- Inert mass: 2,247 kg (4,954 lb)
- Fuel: Liquid hydrogen
- Oxidizer: Liquid oxygen
- Fuel and oxidizer mass: 20,830 kg (45,922 lb)
- Guidance: Inertial
- Thrust: 99.2 kN (22,300 lbf)
- Burn time: Variable; e.g., 842 seconds on Atlas V
- Engine: RL10C-1
- Engine length: 2.32 m (7.6 ft)
- Engine diameter: 1.53 m (5 ft)
- Engine dry weight: 168 kg (370 lb)
- Engine start: Restartable
- Attitude control: 4 x 27 N (6.1 lbf) thrusters, 8 x 40 N (9.0 lbf) thrusters
  - Propellant: Hydrazine

=== Atlas V cryogenic fluid management experiments ===
Most Common Centaurs launched on Atlas V have hundreds to thousands of kilograms of propellants remaining on payload separation. In 2006 these propellants were identified as a possible experimental resource for testing in-space cryogenic fluid management techniques.

In October 2009, the Air Force and United Launch Alliance (ULA) performed an experimental demonstration on the modified Centaur upper stage of DMSP-18 launch to improve "understanding of propellant settling and slosh, pressure control, RL10 chilldown and RL10 two-phase shutdown operations. DMSP-18 was a low mass payload, with approximately 28% (5,400 kg (11,900 lb)) of LH_{2}/LOX propellant remaining after separation. Several on-orbit demonstrations were conducted over 2.4 hours, concluding with a deorbit burn. The initial demonstration was intended to prepare for more-advanced cryogenic fluid management experiments planned under the Centaur-based CRYOTE technology development program in 2012–2014, and will increase the technology readiness level (TRL) of the Advanced Cryogenic Evolved Stage Centaur successor.

== Mishaps ==
Although Centaur has a long and successful flight history, it has experienced a number of mishaps:

- April 7, 1966: Centaur did not restart after coast — ullage motors ran out of fuel.
- August 10, 1968: AC-17. Centaur did not restart after coast — icing of the hydrogen peroxide supply lines.
- May 9, 1971: Centaur guidance failed, destroying itself and the Mariner 8 spacecraft bound for Mars orbit.
- April 18, 1991: AC-70. Centaur failed to restart (icing problem). Incomplete failure investigation initially stated that Centaur failed due to particles from the scouring pads used to clean the propellant ducts getting stuck in the turbopump, preventing start-up.
- August 22, 1992: AC-71. Centaur failed to restart (same icing problem as the prior incident).
- April 30, 1999: Launch of the USA-143 (Milstar DFS-3m) communications satellite failed when a Centaur database error resulted in uncontrolled roll rate and loss of attitude control, placing the satellite in a useless orbit.
- June 15, 2007: the engine in the Centaur upper stage of an Atlas V shut down early, leaving its payload — a pair of National Reconnaissance Office ocean surveillance satellites — in a lower than intended orbit. The failure was called "A major disappointment," though later statements claim the spacecraft will still be able to complete their mission. The cause was traced to a stuck-open valve that depleted some of the hydrogen fuel, resulting in the second burn terminating four seconds early. The problem was fixed, and the next flight was nominal.
- March 23–25, 2018: Atlas V Centaur passivated second stage launched on September 8, 2009, broke up.
- August 30, 2018: Atlas V Centaur passivated second stage launched on September 17, 2014, broke up, creating space debris.
- April 6, 2019: Atlas V Centaur passivated second stage launched on October 17, 2018, broke up.
- September 6, 2024: Atlas V Centaur passivated second stage launched on March 1, 2018, broke up.
