= The Rocket Company =

2005 novel by Patrick J. G. Stiennon and David M. Hoerr

- Author: Patrick J. G. Stiennon, David M. Hoerr
- Illustrator: Doug Birkholz
- Cover artist: Doug Birkholz
- Language: English
- Genre: Science fiction
- Publisher: AIAA
- Publication date: 2005
- Publication place: United States
- Media type: Print (paperback)
- Pages: 263

The Rocket Company is a 2005 science fiction novel, by Patrick J. G. Stiennon and David M. Hoerr, with illustrations by Doug Birkholz about the development of the first successful Reusable Launch Vehicle (RLV). The book was originally serialized online at HobbySpace, before publication in paperback by the American Institute of Aeronautics and Astronautics. Peter H. Diamandis, Chairman/CEO of the X PRIZE Foundation, provided the foreword.

== Plot summary ==
Entrepreneur John Forsyth enlists a number of billionaires to fund the development of the DH-1 RLV. The novel sets out the marketing, regulatory, and technical problems encountered.

== Critical reception ==
Critics gave low marks for drama. Jeff Foust, writing for The Space Review, said of the book during its on-line serialization, "Most of the characters introduced in the book to date are less one-dimensional than zero-dimensional: they exist solely to lecture the narrator on the finer points of metallurgy, propellants, and spacesuit design, and then disappear, their function in the book apparently fulfilled." However, he considered the book to hold promise as a means for describing how a RLV could be built. "Nearly every chapter contains a wealth of information about various aspects of RLV design and development, as well as economic and regulatory concerns. The authors know the material well: both worked on a number of launch vehicle projects for companies as varied as Lockheed and Pacific American Launch Systems. They’re not afraid to delve deep into technical details and minutiae to explain why a particular design approach has been chosen."

Mark Mortimer, reviewing the book for Universe Today, wrote, "By using a person in a fictional company to present technical parameters studies, the authors successfully walk a very challenging tight rope. On one side is the chasm of detail. ... On the other side of the rope, the chasm leads to pure fiction. That is, the authors provide a good story but what value is it in actually getting people into space? Skilfully though, the authors place the readers between these two gaping pitfalls and nicely balance the rocket design and business case with the fictional encounters of people living the lives within a fictitious company."

A reviewer for the British Interplanetary Society's Spaceflight magazine wrote, "As the story progresses the technical, financial and even management, issues are presented as discussion by the protagonists. ... This is a brave attempt to do something different in presenting astronautical engineering and is to be applauded. If the subject interests you it is worth a bash."

Programmer John Walker wrote, "This is a very curious book. The American Institute of Aeronautics and Astronautics isn't known as a publisher of fiction, and yet here we have, well, not exactly a novel, but something between an insider account of a disruptive technological start-up company along the lines of The Soul of A New Machine and a business school case study of a company which doesn't exist, at least not yet.

SpaceX CEO and CTO Elon Musk blurbed the book, writing, "This is an interesting approach to the greatest problem in space exploration: the cost of getting there."

== Adaptations ==
Mark Paton developed a DH-1 rocket add-on for the Orbiter simulator.

== Editions ==
- 2005, American Institute of Aeronautics and Astronautics, paperback, 263 pages, ISBN 978-1-56347-696-9
- 2018, 로켓 컴퍼니, Korean translation by 이기주, ISBN 9791158884628
