= Advanced Cryogenic Evolved Stage =

United Launch Alliance second stage proposal that could be used as a propellant depot

The Advanced Cryogenic Evolved Stage (ACES) was a proposed liquid oxygen/liquid hydrogen upper-stage produced by United Launch Alliance (ULA). During the last five years of the program, ACES was proposed for eventual use on the Vulcan space launch vehicle designed by the U.S. company United Launch Alliance. The ACES concept had the objective to improve the on-orbit lifespan of current upper stages.

In 2015, ULA announced conceptual plans to transition the Vulcan rocket to the ACES second stage, also referred to as Centaur Heavy, after 2024. Vulcan will initially launch with the Centaur V upper stage. Both Boeing and Lockheed Martin had separate but similar ACES concepts prior to the formation of the jointly owned (50% Boeing/50% Lockheed Martin) ULA in late 2006.

In the event, the long-duration upper stage concept was never able to obtain top-line attention from any of the companies as it never won full development funding from the US government, the primary source of funding for the Delta, Atlas and Vulcan rockets. However, some aspects of changes planned for ACES, such as the larger tank-diameter, were eventually used in the Centaur V upper stage.

== Advanced Common Evolved Stage ==
Two Advanced Cryogenic Evolved Stage (ACES) concepts were originally developed in 2005 by both Boeing and Lockheed Martin.

By 2010, ULA had inherited the intellectual property of both proposals, and the ACES concept had evolved into a new high-performance upper stage to be used on both Atlas V and Delta IV/Delta IV Heavy launch vehicles. Now called the Advanced Common Evolved Stage, ACES was proposed to be a lower-cost, more-capable and more-flexible upper stage that would supplement, and perhaps replace, the existing ULA Centaur and Delta Cryogenic Second Stage (DCSS) upper stages. This upper stage was intended to incorporate improved insulation for improved cryogenic storage and longer coast durations.

In April 2015, the name of the stage was reverted to the original Advanced Cryogenic Evolved Stage name, as the new ULA Vulcan design would be the only first stage rocket intended to use ACES, beginning no earlier than 2023.

In September 2020, ULA stated they were no longer actively developing ACES.

== Advanced Cryogenic Evolved Stage ==
As of April 2015, ACES was expected by ULA to debut on the Vulcan launch vehicle no earlier than 2023 but in July 2015 the timeframe was clarified to not likely fly until 2024–2025. In 2018, ULA gave multiple presentations that again showed an ACES debut in 2023. In 2019 however, ULA said that while they still planned to develop ACES, they no longer had a specific date for when that would be.

ACES was planned to use ULA's proprietary Integrated Vehicle Fluids (IVF) technology to significantly extend its lifetime in space.

ACES was planned to include common bulkhead propellant tanks with a diameter of 5.4 m (18 ft), capable of carrying 68,000 kg (150,000 lb) of propellant.

=== Vulcan Centaur upper stage ===
In late 2017, ULA decided to bring the 5.4 m (18 ft) diameter and advanced insulation elements of the ACES upper stage forward. Under the new plan, Vulcan's upper stage is the Centaur V, with two LH2/LOX RL10 engines and no IVF or other ACES extended-duration technology as had been planned for ACES. ACES was then expected to have the same tank diameter as Centaur V, but stretched (longer tank length), with the possible addition of two more RL10s and IVF.

On 11 May 2018, United Launch Alliance (ULA) announced that the Aerojet Rocketdyne RL10 engine was selected for Centaur V, following a competitive procurement process.

=== Integrated Vehicle Fluids ===
The IVF technology uses a lightweight internal combustion engine to use hydrogen and oxygen propellant boil-off (normally wasted when boil-off gases are vented to space) to operate the stage. The design included producing power, maintaining stage attitude and keeping the propellant tanks autogenously pressurized. Using these fluids was designed to eliminate the need for hydrazine fuel, helium for pressurization, and nearly all batteries in the vehicle.

IVF was designed by ULA to be optimal for depot operations, since only liquid hydrogen and liquid oxygen would need be transferred, and it could, if built, conceivably extend mission lifetimes from the present dozens of hours to multiple days.

As of April 2015, an internal combustion engine to be used to power the IVF system on ACES was to be produced by Roush Racing.

In August 2016, ULA's President and CEO Tory Bruno said both Vulcan and ACES were intended to be human rated.

== Possible applications ==
One potential application for ACES was stated by ULA in 2010 to be the use of the longer endurance and the greater fuel capacity as propellant depot with in-space refueling capability to retrieve derelict objects for near-space clean up and deorbit. These new approaches offer the technical prospect of markedly reducing the costs of beyond-low Earth Orbit object capture and deorbit with the implementation of a one-up/one-down launch license regime to Earth orbits.

== See also ==
- Solar-thermal monopropellant thrusters
