= RL60 =

Planned US hydrolox rocket engine, intended to replace the RL10

- Country of origin: United States
- Designer: Pratt & Whitney
- Application: Upper stage engine
- Status: Development halted

Liquid-fuel engine
- Propellant: LOX / LH_{2}
- Mixture ratio: 4.5 to 6.2
- Cycle: Expander cycle

Performance
- Thrust, sea-level: 266.9 kN (60,000 lbf)
- Thrust-to-weight ratio: 51
- Chamber pressure: 83 bar (8.3 MPa; 1,200 psi)
- Specific impulse, vacuum: 465 seconds (4.56 km/s)
- Restarts: 45

Dimensions
- Length: 2.23 m (7.3 ft)
- Diameter: 2.29 m (7.5 ft)
- Dry mass: 1,100 lb

The RL60 was a planned liquid-fuel cryogenic rocket engine designed in the United States by Pratt & Whitney, burning cryogenic liquid hydrogen and liquid oxygen propellants. The engine runs on an expander cycle, running the turbopumps with waste heat absorbed from the main combustion process. This high-efficiency, waste heat based combustion cycle combined with the high-performance liquid hydrogen fuel enables the engine to reach a very high specific impulse of up to 465 seconds in a vacuum. The engine was planned to be a more capable successor to the Aerojet Rocketdyne RL10, providing improved performance and efficiency while maintaining the installation envelope of the RL10.

RL60 was planned to include major improvements to the high-thrust RL10B-2, such as up to 45 engine restarts (up from 15 for RL10B-2), 550 seconds longer engine lifetime (+15.7%), and twice the thrust. Like the RL10B-2, RL60 was planned to incorporate a radiatively cooled extendable nozzle. RL60 was designed to meet the evolving needs of expendable launch requirements and human-rated missions of the early 2000s.

== Description ==
RL60 is an expander cycle, liquid-fuel cryogenic rocket engine burning liquid hydrogen and liquid oxygen. The engine's cycle is virtually identical to the RL10, with some key changes:

- LOX turbopump is driven by a separate turbine and turbine bypass valve instead of a gear drive system
- addition of LH_{2} and LOX boost pumps to accommodate lower propellant inlet pressures and allow higher main pump rotational speeds.

Other key changes from the RL10 include:

- slightly redesigned ignition system (Dual Direct Spark Igniter; DDSI)
- high-heat load copper tubular combustion chamber, enabling much higher turbine power and the highest achieved chamber pressure for an expander cycle engine
- twice as high chamber pressure, accompanied by twice as high thrust (with 10% growth margin)
- slightly longer engine lifetime
- three times as many engine restarts.

While the RL60 is designed, integrated and tested in the US, the engine sources multiple components from international partners:

- LOX turbopump provided by Russian CADB
- LH_{2} turbopump provided by Japanese IHI
- regeneratively cooled nozzle provided by Swedish Volvo Aero.

== History ==
The RL60 has its beginnings in the original commercial Cryogenic Advanced Upper Stage Engine (cCAUSE) program, which began in 1999 and resulted in the RL50 program, a planned 220 kN (50,000 lbf) thrust class engine. The RL50 program later evolved to develop a cryogenic engine that encompassed the requirements and capabilities of both the planned RL50 and ArianeGroup's Vinci engine, the European 180 kN thrust expander cycle LH_{2}/LOX upper-stage engine. The intention was for the RL50 engine to function as the upper stage engine for both US and European expendable launch vehicles, achieving effective cost management and economies of scale through a common engine shared between the European Ariane 5 and future Atlas and Delta US vehicles. The planned collaboration between Snecma, the provider of RL10's carbon-carbon composite nozzles, and Pratt & Whitney effort resulted in the RL50 engine being designated the SPW2000 (Snecma-P&W; 2000 indicates the year).

However, the RL50 program was not fully embraced by ESA. The SPW2000 program was thus rejected by ESA, resulting in the SPW2000 program's cancellation on 22 June 2000. Pratt & Whitney re-established the project under its own RL60 program, so-called to identify it design thrust level of 60,000 lbf. The RL60 Demonstrator Program was initiated in the end of 2000, and was planned to enter full-scale development in early 2003.

In 2003, Pratt & Whitney Space Propulsion had 90% of the work completed for the RL60 engine. The RL60 was to be built and tested in the US, with key components provided by four international industry strategic suppliers: Volvo Aero of Sweden (regeneratively cooled nozzle); Ishikawajima-Harima Heavy Industries (IHI) of Japan (LH_{2} turbopump); Techspace Aero of Belgium (LH_{2} inlet and LOX control valves); and Chemical Automatics Design Bureau (CADB) of Russia (LOX turbopump). As well as performing the systems engineering and integration for the engine, Pratt & Whitney would have manufactured the thrust chamber assembly (TCA) of the engine, consisting of the injector assembly and ignition system, the control system and accompanying valves and plumbing, and the main combustion chamber.

In September 2003, the first combustion chamber for the engine was delivered to be tested. This testing resulted in an unknown (classified) anomaly. The root cause of the anomaly was identified and a second test was planned, but activities attempting to recover from the anomaly were slowed due to uncertain future market opportunities and timing.

The development testing of the engine was planned to culminate in the testing of the first full-scale engine in early 2005, followed by engine qualification and certification in 2006. RL60 production and delivery of flight engines to customers was planned to start in mid-2006.

== See also ==
- RL10, the predecessor of RL60
- Vinci, the European expander cycle LOX/LH_{2} engine the SPW2000 program intended to replace
- RD-0146, a Russian expander cycle LOX/LH_{2} engine with co-development by Pratt & Whitney
- MARC-60 (MB-60), same thrust class LOX/LH_{2} expander cycle engine designed as a joint effort by US's Boeing and Japan's Mitsubishi Heavy Industries in the early 2000s
- YF-75D, a Chinese expander cycle LOX/LH_{2} engine
