= Sustainer engine =

Engines that remain on a rocket after rocket booster separation

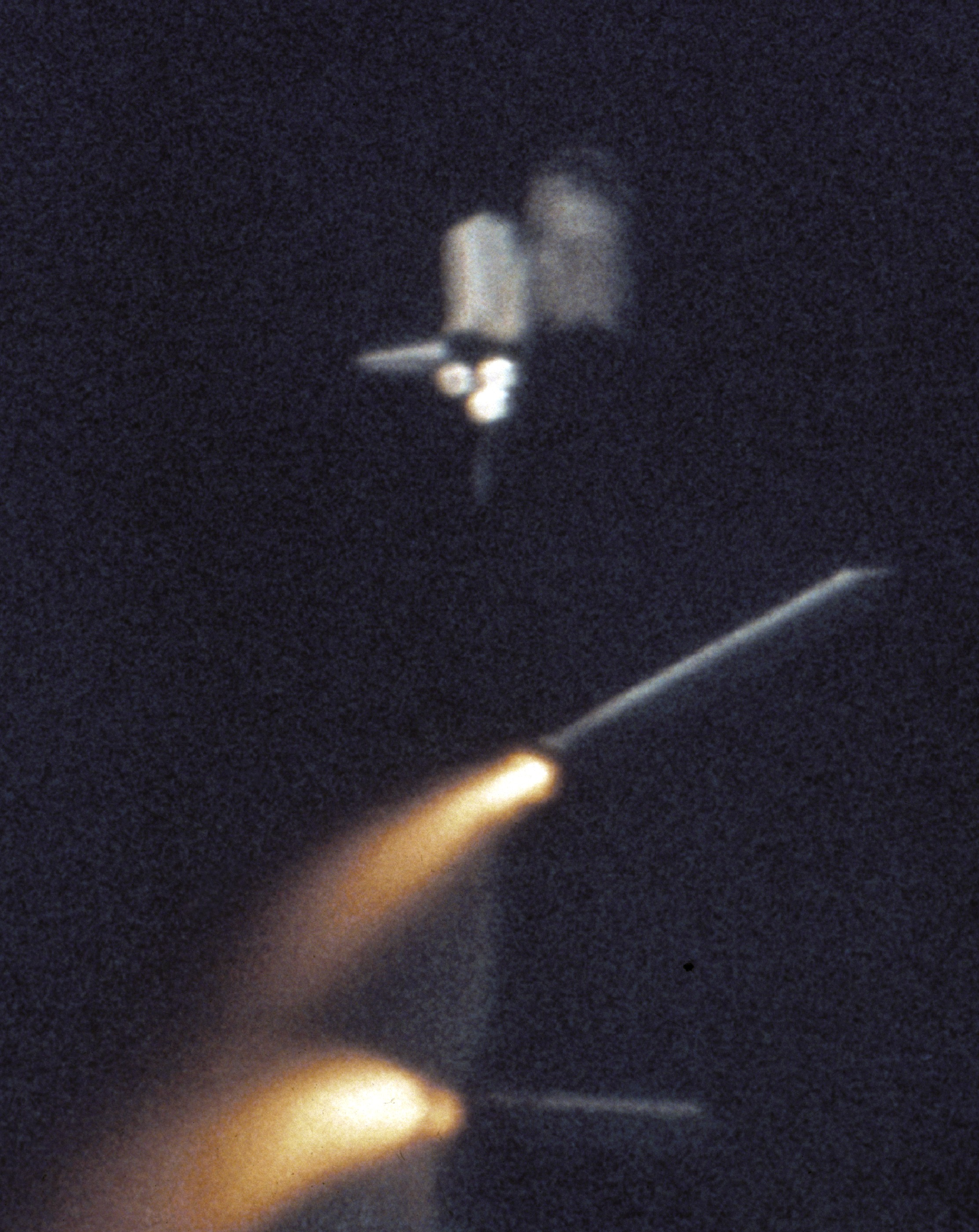
After the two solid rocket boosters separate, the Space Shuttle's three Main Engines act as sustainers

A sustainer engine is a rocket engine which remains with a spacecraft during its ascent after booster engines have separated from the spacecraft.

== See also ==
- Multistage rocket
