= Stofan =

Stofan is a surname. Notable people with the surname include:

- Andrew J. Stofan (1935–2025), American engineer
- Ellen Stofan (born 1961), American scientist
