= William Robbins =

William Robbins may refer to:

- William Robbins (athlete) (1885–1962), American athlete competing at the 1908 Summer Olympics
- William D. Robbins (1874–1952), mayor of Toronto in the 1930s
- William H. Robbins (1926–2009), American NASA engineer
- William Jacob Robbins (1890–1978), American botanist
- William M. Robbins (1828–1905), U.S. Representative from North Carolina
- William Robbins (actor) (died 1645), English comic actor in the Jacobean and Caroline eras

== See also ==
- William Robins (disambiguation)
