= Campaign for Science and Engineering =

Organization

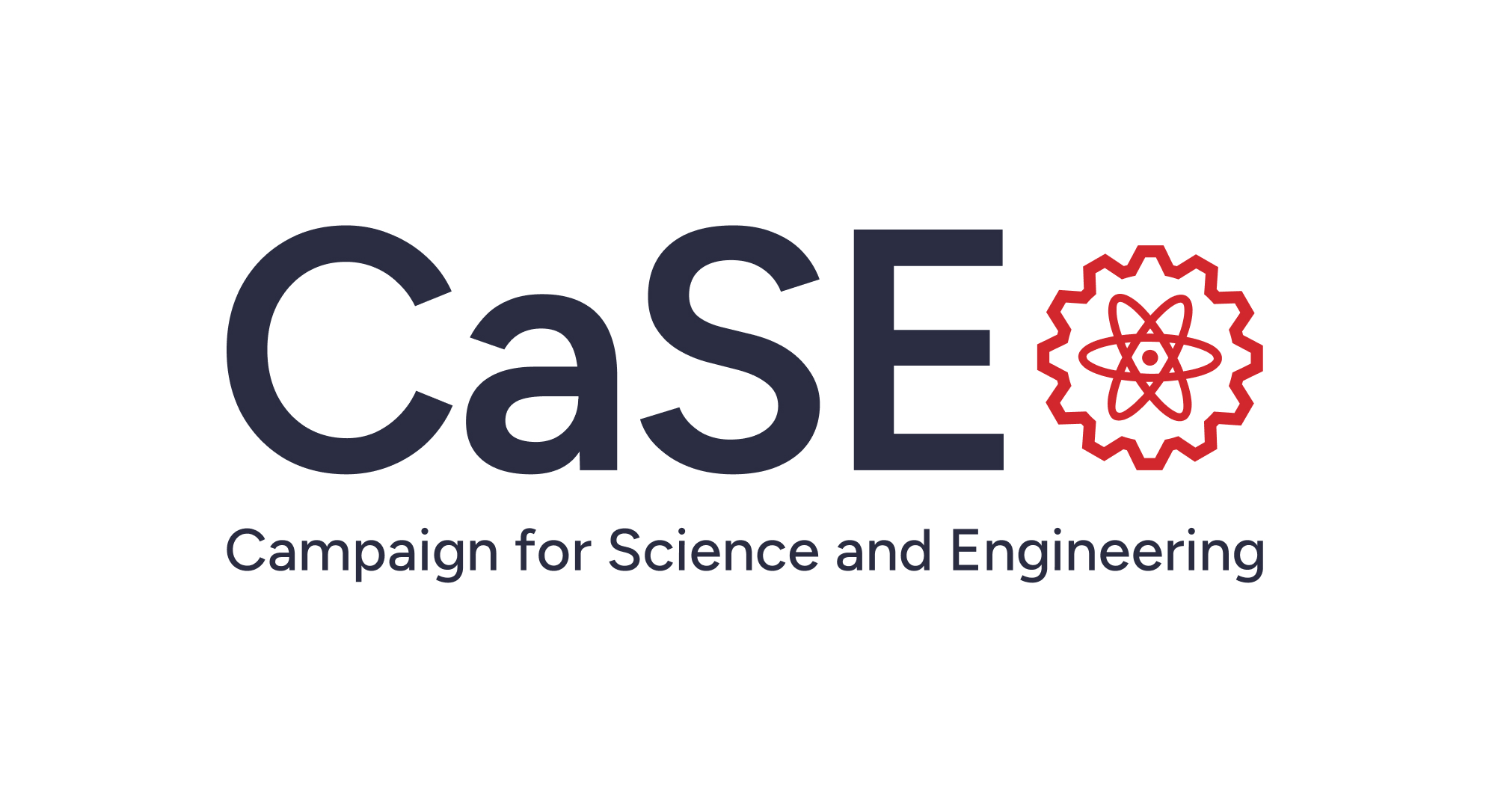
- Abbreviation: CaSE
- Formation: 1986 (Name changed in 2005)
- Legal status: Non-profit organisation, company limited by guarantee
- Purpose: Promoting science and engineering in the UK
- Location: London, WC1
- Region served: United Kingdom
- Chairman: Prof. Hugh Griffiths
- Website: www.sciencecampaign.org.uk

The Campaign for Science and Engineering (CaSE) is a non-profit organisation that is the UK's leading independent advocate for science and engineering. It focuses on arguing for more research funding, promoting a high-tech and knowledge-based economy, highlighting the need for top-quality science and maths education at all levels, and scrutinising the mechanisms by which government uses science and evidence.

== History ==
The Campaign for Science and Engineering was founded as Save British Science (SBS) in January 1986. The organisation started out when 1,500 scientists banded together to pay for an advert in The Times. It called on the Prime Minister, Margaret Thatcher to 'Save British Science'. The organisation changed its name to the Campaign for Science and Engineering (CaSE) in 2005.

== Structure ==
CaSE is based in London. It receives its funding from over 100 member organisations, which currently include companies such as Astra Zeneca, GlaxoSmithKline, and Johnson Matthey; universities such as the University of Oxford and University of Cambridge; learned and professional societies such as the Royal Society of Biology, Institute of Physics and Royal Society of Chemistry; and charities including Cancer Research UK. CaSE also has a large number of individual members.

CaSE employs a team of staff who are led by the executive director. It also has a board of directors who meet several times each year to discuss CaSE's strategy and set its campaigning priorities, as well as being responsible for governance and financial management of the organisation. Dr Robert Sorrell is the current chair of the board.

== Activity ==
CaSE focuses its activity in five priority areas; People and Skills, Investment, Political Engagement, Public Opinion, and Research System delivering independent analysis and recommendations for action in reports in these areas. Following the 2016 Brexit referendum, it has been a strong voice in the areas of immigration, collaboration and regulation which are of particular concern to the science and engineering sector.

In 2010, CaSE played a key role in the Science is Vital campaign, which lobbied against cuts to the UK science budget in the Comprehensive Spending Review of October that year. The science budget was frozen in the final review. In 2017 CaSE called for increase in R&D investment and the government subsequently committed to increasing spending to 2.4% of GDP by 2027. Other successes include lobbying for amendments to the HE and Research Bill in 2016.

In 2023 CaSE published major pieces of work into Public Attitudes to Research and Development, and the Skills needs of a more innovative UK.

CaSE holds regular meetings with representatives from its member organisations to inform its work, alongside sustained political engagement. This include meeting directly with MPs and Peers, submitting evidence to Select Committee Inquiries and being invited to speak at conference and panel events.

CaSE also holds an annual lecture which is given by prominent scientific or political figures including Jo Johnson, then Universities and Science Minister, in 2016, Professor Ellen Stofan, then NASA Chief Scientist in 2014, Professor Anne Glover CBE, then EU Chief Scientific Advisor in 2013, and Sir Patrick Vallance, then UK Government Chief Scientific Advisor in 2019.
