= William Robins =

William Robins may refer to:

- William Robins (priest) (1868–1949), Anglican priest, Archdeacon of Bedford
- William Robins (cricketer) (1907–1990), English cricketer and British Army officer
- William Robert Robins (1886–1959), English trade unionist and politician

== See also ==
- William Robbins (disambiguation)
