= Shuttle-Centaur =

Proposed Space Shuttle upper stage

Centaur G and G-Prime
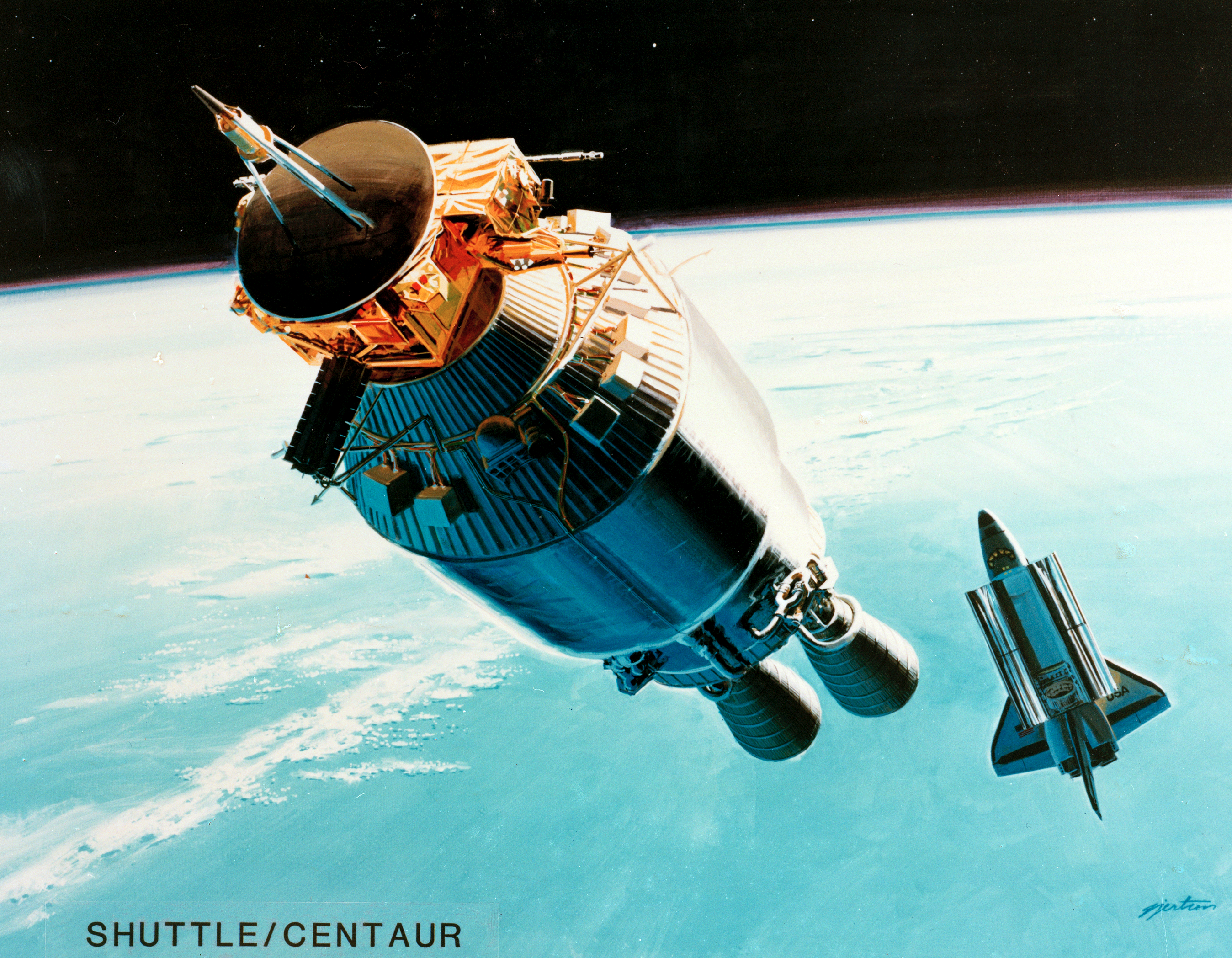
- Illustration of Shuttle-Centaur G-Prime with Ulysses
- Manufacturer: General Dynamics
- Country of origin: United States

Centaur G-Prime
- Height: 9.3 m (31 ft)
- Diameter: 4.6 m (15 ft)
- Empty mass: 2,761 kg (6,088 lb)
- Gross mass: 22,800 kg (50,270 lb)
- Powered by: 2 x RL10-3-3A
- Maximum thrust: 73.40 kN (16,500 lbf) (per engine)
- Specific impulse: 446.4 s
- Propellant: Liquid hydrogen / LOX

Centaur G
- Height: 6.1 m (20 ft)
- Diameter: 4.6 m (15 ft)
- Empty mass: 3,060 kg (6,750 lb)
- Gross mass: 16,928 kg (37,319 lb)
- Powered by: 2 x RL10-3-3B
- Maximum thrust: 66.70 kN (14,990 lbf) (per engine)
- Specific impulse: 440.4 s
- Propellant: Liquid hydrogen / LOX

Shuttle-Centaur was a version of the Centaur upper stage rocket designed to be carried aloft inside the Space Shuttle and used to launch satellites into high Earth orbits or probes into deep space. Two variants were developed: Centaur G-Prime, which was planned to launch the Galileo and Ulysses robotic probes to Jupiter, and Centaur G, a shortened version planned for use with United States Department of Defense Milstar satellites and the Magellan Venus probe. The powerful Centaur upper stage allowed for heavier deep space probes, and for them to reach Jupiter sooner, prolonging the operational life of the spacecraft. However, neither variant ever flew on a Shuttle. Support for the project came from the United States Air Force (USAF) and the National Reconnaissance Office, which asserted that its classified satellites required the power of Centaur. The USAF agreed to pay half the design and development costs of Centaur G, and the National Aeronautics and Space Administration (NASA) paid the other half.

Both versions were cradled in the reusable Centaur integrated support system (CISS), an aluminum structure that handled communications between the Space Shuttle and the Centaur. All Centaur stages periodically vented hydrogen, which needs to be stored below −253 °C (−423 °F) to keep it from boiling. Two Shuttle-Centaur missions were scheduled, with one-hour launch windows six days apart, so two separate spacecraft and launch pads were required. The Space Shuttles Challenger and Atlantis were modified to carry the CISS. The Space Shuttle main engines would have been run at 109 percent of the rated power level (with regular Shuttle flights using 104%, possible thanks to margins that were found after development concluded). The payloads needed to be deployed on the first day in orbit, so the missions would be flown by four-person crews composed of astronauts who had already flown in space and were known to not suffer from space adaptation syndrome. The first Centaur G-Prime was rolled out from the General Dynamics factory in Kearny Mesa, San Diego, on 13 August 1985.

Just months before the Shuttle-Centaur was scheduled to fly, the Challenger disaster occurred, and the project was canceled. The Galileo and Ulysses probes were ultimately launched using the much less powerful solid-fueled Inertial Upper Stage (IUS), Galileo needing multiple gravitational assists from Venus and Earth to reach Jupiter. The USAF mated a variant of the Centaur G-Prime upper stage with its Titan rocket to produce the Titan IV, which made its first flight in 1994. Over the next 18 years, Titan IV and Centaur G-Prime placed eighteen military satellites in orbit.

== Background ==
=== Centaur ===
Centaur is an upper stage rocket that used liquid hydrogen as fuel and liquid oxygen as an oxidizer. It was developed by General Dynamics in the late 1950s and early 1960s and powered by twin Pratt & Whitney RL10 engines. Rockets utilizing liquid hydrogen as fuel theoretically can lift 40 percent more payload per kilogram of liftoff weight than rockets burning kerosene, but the challenges of using liquid hydrogen required new technology to be developed. Liquid hydrogen is a cryogenic fuel, meaning that it condenses at extremely low temperatures, and must be stored below −253 °C (−423 °F) to keep it from boiling. Thus, insulation from all sources of heat, including the rocket exhaust, the relatively warm liquid oxygen, aerodynamic heating, and the radiant heat of the Sun, was required.

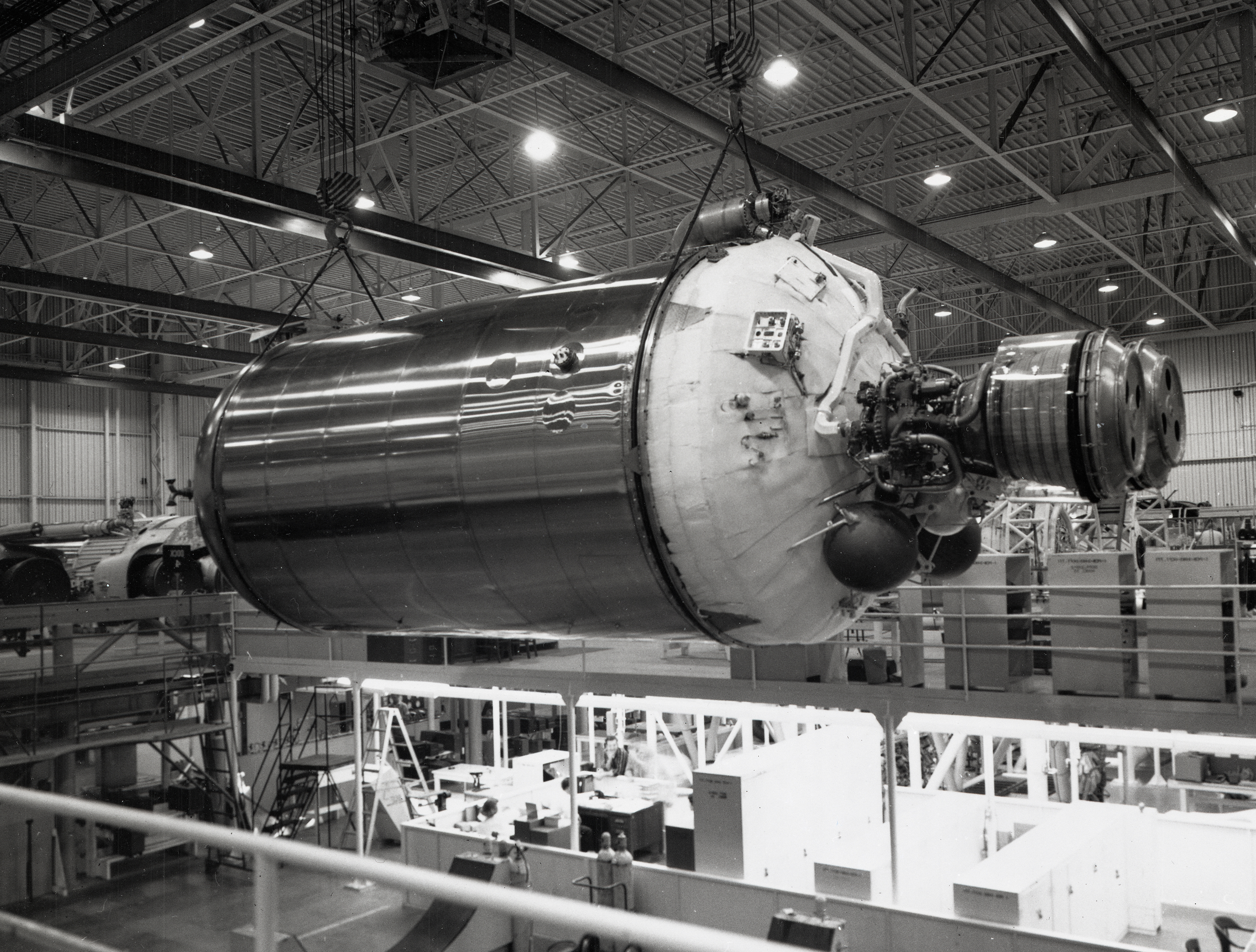
A Centaur rocket during assembly at General Dynamics in 1962. Its development pioneered the use of liquid hydrogen as a rocket fuel.

Fuel could be lost through microscopic holes that only hydrogen could leak through, but sealing the fuel tank created another problem. Even when insulated, heat leaks could cause the temperature to rise and boil the hydrogen; pressure in the tank can then build up and rupture it unless proper venting is provided, but too much venting will cause the loss of excessive amounts of fuel. These challenges dogged the development of Centaur with technical difficulties, such as fuel leaking through the welds, and the shrinking of the metal bulkhead when coming into sudden contact with the cryogenic temperatures of liquid hydrogen. Further complicating matters was the explosion of an RL10 on an engine test stand during a demonstration for United States Air Force (USAF) and National Air and Space Administration (NASA) officials.

The project's management was transferred from NASA's Marshall Space Flight Center in Huntsville, Alabama, to its Lewis Research Center in Ohio in October 1962, and Abe Silverstein, a strong advocate of liquid hydrogen, took charge. He insisted on a thorough testing regime, which both identified problems and suggested solutions to them. The technical problems of the Centaur project were gradually overcome. The design notably included the weight-saving features pioneered by the Atlas rocket family: a monocoque steel shell that held its shape only when pressurized, hydrogen and oxygen tanks separated by a common bulkhead, and no internal bracing or insulation surrounding the propellant tanks. The technology for handling liquid hydrogen in Centaur was also used the S-II and S-IVB upper stages of the Saturn V rocket, and later by the Space Shuttle external tank and Space Shuttle main engines (SSME).

Throughout the 1960s and 1970s, Centaur was used as the upper stage of Atlas-Centaur launch vehicles, which helped launch seven Surveyor missions, five Mariner missions, and the Pioneer 10 and 11 probes. In the 1970s, Centaur was also placed atop the USAF's Titan III booster to create the Titan IIIE launch vehicle, which was used to launch the Viking, Helios, and Voyager missions. By 1980, Centaur upper stages had flown 55 times, failing only twice.

=== Space Shuttle upper stages ===
The 1972 decision to develop the Space Shuttle augured badly for the projects to explore the Solar System with robotic probes, which were coming under intense scrutiny by an increasingly cost-conscious Nixon administration and United States Congress. The Space Shuttle was never intended to operate beyond low Earth orbit, but many satellites needed to be higher, particularly communications satellites, for which geostationary orbits were preferred. The Space Shuttle concept originally called for a crewed space tug, which would be launched by a Saturn V. It would use a space station as a base and be serviced and refueled by the Space Shuttle. Budget cutbacks led to the decision to terminate Saturn V production in 1970 and the abandoning of plans to build a space station. The space tug became an upper stage, to be carried into space by the Space Shuttle. As a hedge against further cutbacks or technical difficulties, NASA also commissioned studies of reusable Agena and Centaur upper stages.

With funding tight, NASA sought to offload Space Shuttle-related projects onto other organizations. NASA Deputy Administrator George Low met with Malcolm R. Currie, the Director of Defense Research and Engineering, in September 1973, and reached an informal agreement that the USAF would develop an interim upper stage (IUS) for the Space Shuttle, to be used for launching satellites in higher orbits pending the development of the space tug. After some debate, Pentagon officials agreed to commit to the IUS on 11 July 1974. The Secretary of Defense, James R. Schlesinger, confirmed the decision when he met with NASA Administrator James C. Fletcher and Low four days later. A series of study contracts were let, resulting in a decision that the IUS would be an expendable solid-fuel upper stage. A call for bids was then issued, and the competition was won by Boeing in August 1976. The IUS was renamed the Inertial Upper Stage in December 1977. The Marshall Space Flight Center was designated the lead center for managing IUS work.

In April 1978, the quote for the development of the IUS was $263 million (equivalent to $965 million in 2023), but by December 1979 it was renegotiated for $430 million (equivalent to $1456 million in 2023). The main drawback of the IUS was that it was not powerful enough to launch a payload to Jupiter without resorting to gravitational slingshot maneuvers around other planets to garner more speed, something most engineers regarded as inelegant, and which planetary scientists at NASA's Jet Propulsion Laboratory (JPL) disliked because it meant that the mission would take months or years longer to reach Jupiter. The IUS was constructed in a modular fashion, with two stages: a large one with 9,700 kilograms (21,400 lb) of propellant and a smaller one with 2,700 kilograms (6,000 lb), which was sufficient for most satellites. It could also be configured with two large stages to launch multiple satellites. The USAF asked NASA to develop a configuration with three stages, two large and one small, that could be used for a planetary mission like Galileo. NASA contracted with Boeing for its development.

=== Deep space probes ===
Congress approved funding for the Jupiter Orbiter Probe on 12 July 1977. The following year the spacecraft was renamed Galileo after Galileo Galilei, the 17th-century astronomer who had discovered the largest four of Jupiter's moons, now known as the Galilean moons. During the early 1980s, Galileo struggled with both technical and funding difficulties, and the Office of Management and Budget (OMB) targeted NASA for budget cuts. The intervention of the USAF saved Galileo from cancellation. It was interested in the development of autonomous spacecraft like Galileo that could take evasive action in the face of anti-satellite weapons, and in the manner in which the JPL was designing Galileo to withstand the intense radiation of the magnetosphere of Jupiter, which had application in surviving nearby nuclear detonations. The Galileo project aimed for a launch window in January 1982 when the alignment of the planets would be favorable to using Mars for a slingshot maneuver to reach Jupiter. Galileo would be the fifth spacecraft to visit Jupiter, and the first to orbit it, while the probe it carried would be the first to enter its atmosphere. In December 1984, Galileo project manager John R. Casani proposed that Galileo make a flyby of asteroid 29 Amphitrite while en route. It would be the first time a US space mission visited an asteroid. NASA Administrator James M. Beggs endorsed the proposal as a secondary objective for Galileo.

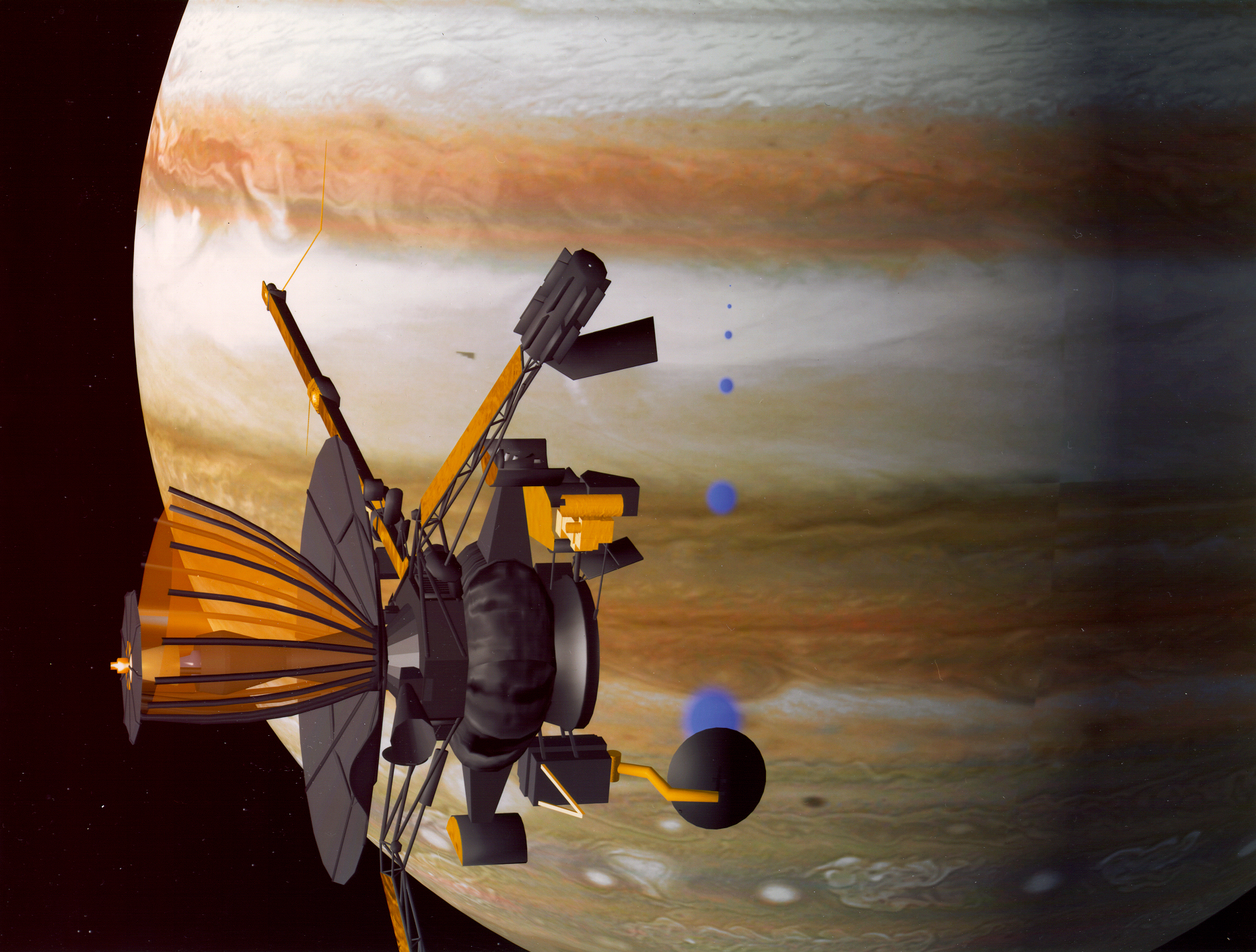
Artist's impression of the Galileo spacecraft in orbit around Jupiter

To enhance reliability and reduce costs, the Galileo project's engineers decided to switch from a pressurized atmospheric entry probe to a vented one. This added 100 kilograms (220 lb) to its weight, and another 165 kilograms (364 lb) was added in structural changes to improve reliability, all of which would require extra fuel in the IUS. But the three-stage IUS was itself overweight, by about 3,200 kilograms (7,000 lb) against its design specifications. Lifting Galileo and the IUS would require the use of the special lightweight version of the Space Shuttle external tank, the Space Shuttle orbiter stripped of all non-essential equipment, and the SSME running at full power—109 percent of their rated power level. This necessitated the development of a more elaborate engine cooling system. By late 1979, delays in the Space Shuttle program pushed the launch date for Galileo back to 1984, when the planets would no longer be aligned so that a Mars slingshot would be sufficient to reach Jupiter.

An alternative to the IUS was to use Centaur as an upper stage with the Space Shuttle. Shuttle-Centaur would require neither 109 percent power from the SSME, nor a slingshot maneuver to send the 2,000 kilograms (4,500 lb) to Jupiter. NASA's Associate Administrator for Space Transportation Systems, John Yardley, directed the Lewis Research Center to determine the feasibility of integrating Centaur with the Space Shuttle. The engineers at Lewis concluded that it was both feasible and safe. A source inside NASA told The Washington Post journalist Thomas O'Toole that the cost of modifying Centaur so it could be carried on the Space Shuttle would be worth it, as the performance benefit of Centaur would mean that Galileo was no longer tied to a 1982 launch window.

A third possibility considered was to launch Galileo using a Centaur upper stage atop a Titan IIIE, but this would have required rebuilding the launch complex at Cape Canaveral, which would have added at least $125 million (equivalent to $423 million in 2023) to the cost of the $285 million (equivalent to $965 million in 2023) Galileo project. Beggs insisted that expendable launch vehicles (ELVs) were obsolete and that any money spent on them would only undermine the Space Shuttle's cost-effectiveness. Moreover, Titan had been developed by and was owned and controlled by, the USAF, and its use would mean that NASA would have to work closely with the USAF, something that NASA management hoped to avoid as much as possible. While NASA and the USAF collaborated and depended on each other to some extent, they were also rivals, and NASA resisted attempts by United States Department of Defense (DoD) to manage the space program. On 13 November 1981, President Ronald Reagan issued National Security Decision Directive Number 8, which directed that the Space Shuttle would be the primary launch system for all military and civil government missions, but Edward C. Aldridge Jr., the Under Secretary of the Air Force (and secretly the Director of the National Reconnaissance Office) doubted that NASA could meet its target of twenty-four Space Shuttle launches a year; he thought that twelve was more likely, and given that only the newest two orbiters, Discovery and Atlantis could lift his largest payloads, there might not be enough Space Shuttle flights. Reagan was persuaded to revise his policy to permit a mixed fleet of ELVs and Space Shuttles, and the USAF ordered ten Titan IV rockets in 1984. NASA historian T. A. Heppenheimer noted that in retrospect, "it was a mistake not to go with the Titan IIIE-Centaur", given the delays and higher costs ultimately involved in using the Shuttle, but this was not apparent in 1984.

Although Galileo was the only American planetary mission scheduled, there was another mission in preparation: the International Solar Polar Mission, which was renamed Ulysses in 1984. It was originally conceived in 1977 as a two-spacecraft mission, NASA and the European Space Agency (ESA) each providing one spacecraft, but the American one was canceled in 1981, and NASA's contribution was limited to the power supply, launch vehicle, and tracking via the NASA Deep Space Network. The object of the mission was to gain an enhanced knowledge of the heliosphere by putting a satellite into a polar orbit around the Sun. Because Earth's orbit is inclined only 7.25 degrees to the Sun's equator, the solar poles cannot be observed from Earth. Scientists hoped to gain a greater understanding of the solar wind, the interplanetary magnetic field, cosmic rays and cosmic dust. The Ulysses probe had the same initial destination as Galileo, as it would first have to travel out to Jupiter and then use a slingshot maneuver to leave the ecliptic plane and enter a solar polar orbit.

Another mission for Shuttle-Centaur subsequently appeared in the form of the Venus Radar Mapper, later renamed Magellan. The first mission integration panel meeting for this probe was held at the Lewis Research Center on 8 November 1983. Several Space Shuttle upper stages were considered, including the Orbital Sciences Corporation Transfer Orbit Stage (TOS), the Astrotech Corporation Delta Transfer Stage, and the Boeing IUS, but the meeting chose Centaur as the best option. Magellan was tentatively scheduled for launch in April 1988. The USAF adopted Shuttle-Centaur in 1984 for the launch of its Milstar satellites. These military communications satellites were hardened against interception, jamming and nuclear attack. Telephone conversations with General Dynamics regarding the project had to be conducted over secure lines. Having the USAF on board had saved the project from cancellation, but the USAF asked for design changes and performance enhancements. One such change was to allow the Milstar to have a direct connection with Centaur that would be separated using explosive bolts, which required further testing to ascertain the effect of the resulting shock.

== Decision to use Shuttle-Centaur ==
NASA Administrator Robert A. Frosch stated in November 1979 that he was not in favor of using Centaur, but Centaur found a champion in Congressman Edward P. Boland, who considered the IUS too underpowered for deep space missions, although he did not oppose its development for other purposes. He was impressed by Centaur's ability to put Galileo in Jupiter orbit with just two years' flight and saw potential military applications for it as well. He chaired the House Intelligence Committee and the House Independent Agencies Appropriations Subcommittee of the House Appropriations Committee, and had the Appropriations Committee instruct NASA to use Centaur if weight problems with Galileo prompted a further postponement. Orders from a Congressional committee had no legal standing, so NASA was free to disregard this. Appearing before the Senate, Frosch was non-committal, saying only that NASA had the matter under consideration.

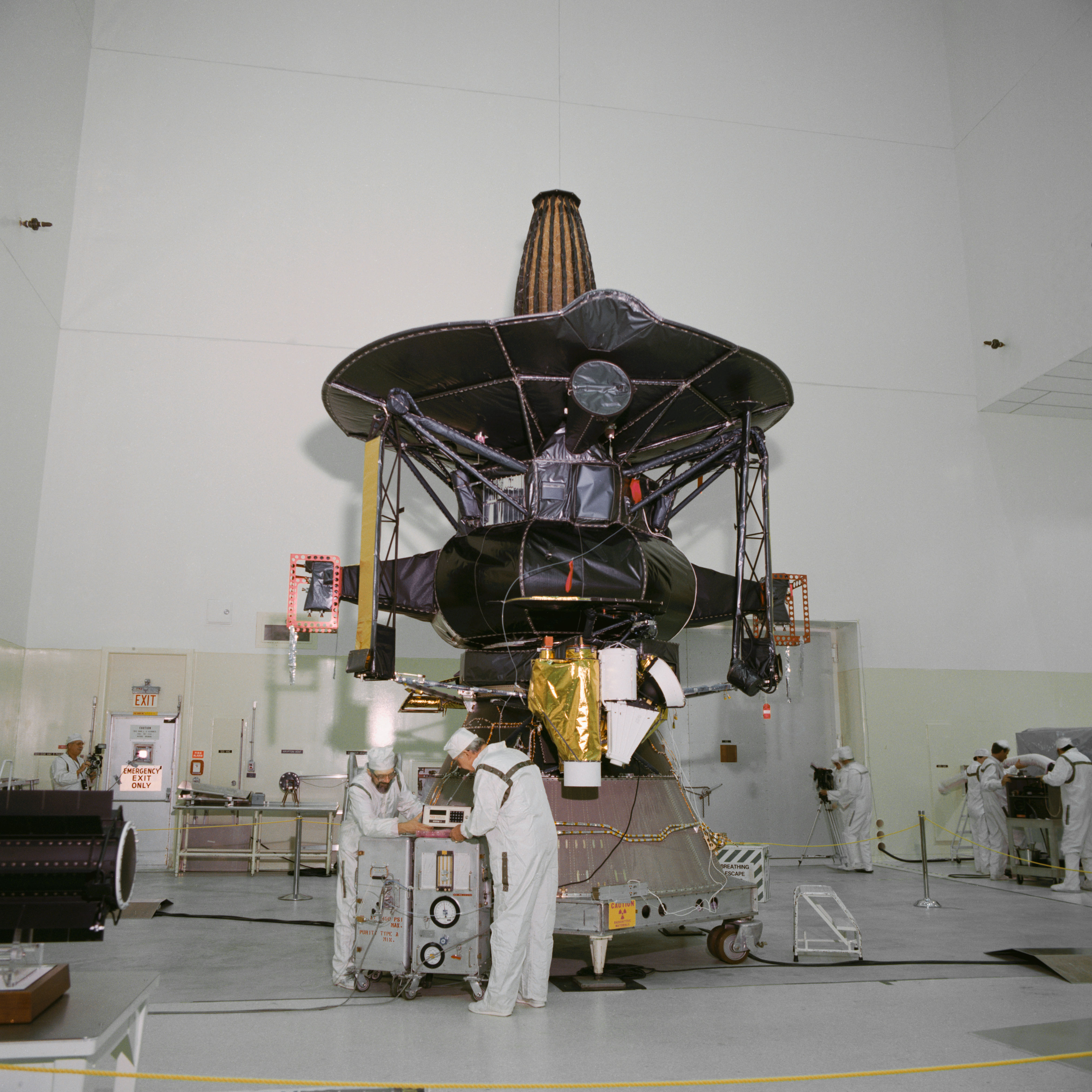
Galileo spacecraft at the Kennedy Space Center's (KSC's) Spacecraft Assembly and Encapsulation Facility 2 in 1989

NASA decided to split Galileo into two separate spacecraft: an atmospheric probe and a Jupiter orbiter, the orbiter being launched in February 1984 and the probe following a month later. The orbiter would be in orbit around Jupiter when the probe arrived, allowing it to perform its role as a relay. Separating the two spacecraft was estimated to cost another $50 million (equivalent to $169 million in 2023). NASA hoped to be able to recoup some of this through separate competitive bidding on the two. But while the atmospheric probe was light enough to launch with the two-stage IUS, the Jupiter orbiter was too heavy to do so, even with a gravitational slingshot around Mars, so the three-stage IUS was still required.

By late 1980, the estimated cost of the development of the two-stage IUS had risen to $506 million (equivalent to $1571 million in 2023). The USAF could absorb this cost overrun (and indeed had anticipated that it might cost far more), but NASA was faced with a quote of $179 million (equivalent to $508 million in 2023) for the development of the three-stage version, which was $100 million (equivalent to $284 million in 2023) more than it had budgeted. At a press conference on 15 January 1981, Frosch announced that NASA was withdrawing support for the three-stage IUS and going with Centaur because "no other alternative upper stage is available on a reasonable schedule or with comparable costs."

Centaur provided important advantages over the IUS. The main one was that it was far more powerful. The Galileo probe and orbiter could be recombined and the probe could be delivered directly to Jupiter in two years' flight time. Longer travel times meant that components would age and the onboard power supply and propellant would be depleted. The radioisotope thermoelectric generators (RTGs) on Ulysses and Galileo produced about 570 watts at launch, which decreased at the rate of 0.6 watts per month. Some of the gravity assist options also involved flying closer to the Sun, which would induce thermal stresses.

Another advantage that Centaur had over the IUS was while it was more powerful, Centaur generated its thrust more slowly, thereby minimizing jerk and the chance of damage to the payload. Also, unlike solid-fuel rockets, which burned to depletion once ignited, the liquid-fuel engines on Centaur could be shut down and restarted. This gave Centaur flexibility in the form of mid-course corrections and multi-burn flight profiles, which increased the chances of a successful mission. Finally, Centaur was proven and reliable. The only concern was about safety; solid-fuel rockets were considered far safer than liquid-fuel ones, especially ones containing liquid hydrogen. NASA engineers estimated that additional safety features might take up to five years to develop and cost up to $100 million (equivalent to $284 million in 2023).

The IUS made its first flight atop a Titan 34D in October 1982, when it placed two military satellites in geosynchronous orbit. It was then used on a Space Shuttle mission, STS-6 in April 1983, to deploy the first tracking and data relay satellite (TDRS-1), but the IUS's nozzle changed its position by one degree, resulting in the satellite being placed in the wrong orbit. It took two years to determine what had gone wrong and how to prevent it happening again.

== Congressional approval ==
The decision to go with Centaur pleased planetary scientists and was welcomed by the communications industry, because it meant that larger satellites could be placed into geostationary orbits, whereas the Shuttle and IUS were limited to 3,000-kilogram (6,600 lb) payloads. NASA Headquarters liked Shuttle-Centaur as an answer to the ESA's Ariane rocket family; by 1986, new versions of the Ariane under development were expected to be able to lift payloads heavier than 3,000 kilograms (6,600 lb) into geostationary orbits, thereby cutting NASA out of a lucrative segment of the satellite launch business. The USAF, though disappointed with NASA's decision to drop the three-stage IUS, foresaw a need for USAF satellites to carry more propellant than previously to engage in avoidance maneuvers against anti-satellite weapons.

Two groups, in particular, were unhappy with the decision: Boeing and the Marshall Space Flight Center. Other aerospace companies were disappointed that NASA had decided to adapt the existing Centaur upper stage rather than develop a new high energy upper stage (HEUS) or the orbital transfer vehicle (OTV), as the space tug was now called. The OMB was not opposed to Centaur on any technical grounds, but it was a discretionary expense and in the budget-cutting atmosphere of 1981, one that the OMB felt could be dropped for the fiscal year 1983 budget, which was submitted to Congress in February 1982. Galileo was reconfigured for a 1985 launch using the two-stage IUS, which would take four years to get to Jupiter and reduce the number of moons visited by half when it got there.

Senator Harrison Schmitt, the Chairman of the Senate Subcommittee on Science, Technology and Space, and a former astronaut who had walked on the Moon on Apollo 17, was opposed to the OMB decision, as were the House and Senate Appropriations Committees. Support for it came from the Chairman of the House Subcommittee on Science, Technology and Space, Congressman Ronnie G. Flippo, whose district in Alabama encompassed the Marshall Space Flight Center. In July 1982, the proponents of Centaur added $140 million (equivalent to $374 million in 2023) to the Emergency Supplemental Appropriations Act, which was signed into law by Reagan on 18 July 1982. As well as allocating the funding, it directed NASA and Boeing to cease work on the two-stage IUS for Galileo.

Flippo fought this decision. He argued that Centaur was too expensive, as it cost $140 million in the current year with the whole Shuttle-Centaur project estimated to cost around $634 million (equivalent to $1694 million in 2023); that it was of limited use, since it was only required for two deep space missions; and that it was a prime example of faulty procurement, because an important contract was being given to General Dynamics without any form of tender process. He enlisted the support of Congressman Don Fuqua, the Chairman of the House Committee on Science, Space and Technology. Centaur was defended by Congressman Bill Lowery, whose San Diego district included General Dynamics.

On 15 September, Flippo moved an amendment to the 1983 NASA appropriations bill that would have forbidden further work on Centaur, but his position was undermined by Aldridge and Beggs, who contended that the early Space Shuttle flights showed that classified Department of Defense satellites would require more shielding, which would add more weight, and therefore require the power of Centaur. Aldridge and Beggs announced that they would soon conclude an agreement for the joint development of Shuttle-Centaur. Flippo's amendment was defeated by a vote of 316 to 77, clearing the way for the Shuttle-Centaur project.

== Design ==
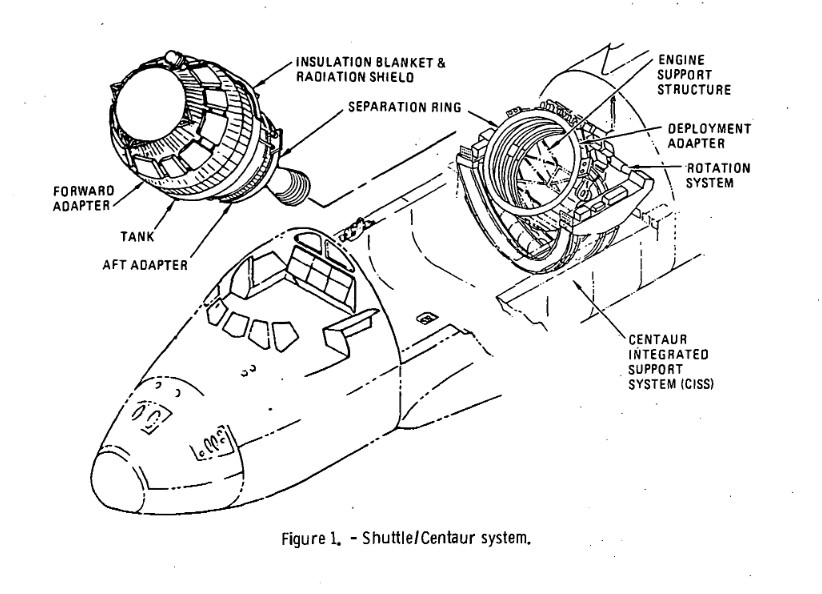
Shuttle-Centaur system

On 30 August 1982, a meeting of representatives of the NASA centers and Centaur contractors was held at General Dynamics in San Diego to discuss the requirements of the project. The principal constraint was that both the satellite and Centaur upper stage had to fit inside the Space Shuttle's cargo bay, which could accommodate loads up to 18.3 meters (60 ft) long and 4.6 meters (15 ft) wide. The longer the Centaur, the less space for the payload and vice versa.

From this arose two new versions of Centaur: Centaur G and Centaur G-Prime. Centaur G was intended for USAF missions, specifically to place satellites into geostationary orbits, and the $269 million (equivalent to $719 million in 2023) to design and develop it was split 50–50 with the USAF. It was 6.1 meters (20 ft) long, allowing for large USAF payloads up to 12.2 meters (40 ft) long. Its dry weight was 3,060 kilograms (6,750 lb) and it weighed 16,928 kilograms (37,319 lb) fully loaded. Centaur G-Prime was intended for deep space missions and was 9.0 meters (29.5 ft) long, allowing it to carry more propellant, but restricting the length of the payload to 9.3 meters (31 ft). The dry weight of the Centaur G-Prime was 2,761 kilograms (6,088 lb), and it weighed 22,800 kilograms (50,270 lb) fully loaded.

The two versions were very similar, 80 percent of their components being the same. The Centaur G-Prime stage had two RL10-3-3A engines, each with 73,400 newtons (16,500 lb_{f}) thrust, and a specific impulse of 446.4 seconds, with a 5:1 fuel ratio. The Centaur G stage had two RL10-3-3B engines, each with 66,700 newtons (15,000 lb_{f}) thrust, and specific impulse of 440.4 seconds, with a 6:1 fuel ratio. The engines were capable of multiple restarts after long periods of coasting in space and had a hydraulic gimbal actuation system powered by the turbopump.

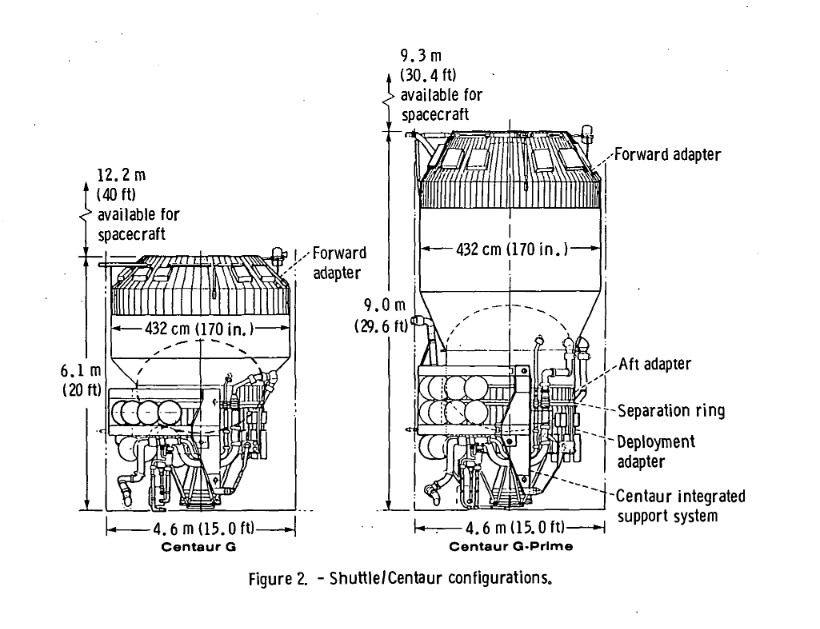
Centaur G and G-Prime configurations

The Centaur G and G-Prime avionics were the same as that of the standard Centaur and were still mounted in the forward equipment module. They used a 24-bit Teledyne Digital Computer Unit with 16 kilobytes of RAM to control guidance and navigation. They still used the same pressurized steel tank, but with more insulation including a two-layer foam blanket over the forward bulkhead and a three-layer radiation shield. Other changes included new forward and aft adapters; a new propellant fill, drain and dump system; and an S band transmitter and RF system compatible with the TDRS system. Considerable effort was put into making Centaur safe, with redundant components to overcome malfunctions and a propellant draining, dumping and venting system so that the propellants could be dumped in case of emergency.

Both versions were cradled in the Centaur integrated support system (CISS), a 4.6-meter (15 ft) aluminum structure that handled communications between the Space Shuttle and the Centaur upper stage. It helped keep the number of modifications to the Space Shuttle to a minimum. When the cargo doors opened, the CISS would pivot 45 degrees into a ready position to launch Centaur. After twenty minutes, the Centaur would be launched by a set of twelve coil springs with a 10-centimeter (4 in) stroke known as the Super*Zip separation ring. The Centaur upper stage would then coast at a speed of 0.30 meters per second (1 ft/s) for 45 minutes before starting its main burn a safe distance from the Space Shuttle. For most missions, only a single burn was required. Once the burn was complete, the spacecraft would separate from the Centaur upper stage, which could still maneuver to avoid striking the spacecraft.

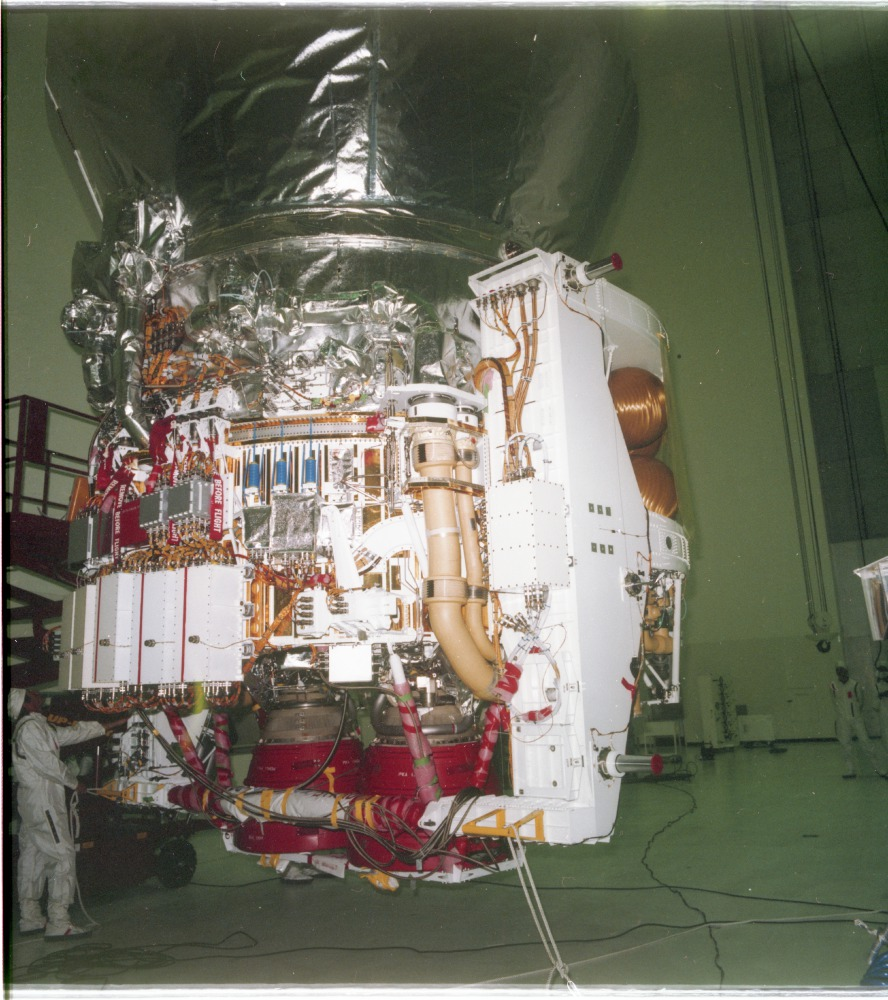
Centaur G-Prime in the CISS (right)

All electrical connections between the Orbiter and the Centaur were routed through the CISS. Electrical power for the Centaur was provided by a 150-ampere-hour (540,000 C) silver zinc battery. Power for the CISS was provided by two 375-ampere-hour (1,350,000 C) batteries. Since the CISS was also plugged into the Orbiter, this provided two-failure redundancy. The Centaur G CISS weighed 2,947 kilograms (6,497 lb) and the Centaur G-Prime CISS 2,961 kilograms (6,528 lb). The CISS was fully reusable for ten flights and would be returned to Earth. The Space Shuttles Challenger and Atlantis were modified to carry the CISS. These changes included additional plumbing to load and vent Centaur's cryogenic propellants, and controls on the aft flight deck for loading and monitoring the Centaur upper stage.

By June 1981, the Lewis Research Center had awarded four contracts for Centaur G-Prime worth a total of $7,483,000 (equivalent to $20 million in 2023): General Dynamics was to develop the Centaur rockets; Teledyne, the computer and multiplexers; Honeywell, the guidance and navigation systems; and Pratt & Whitney, the four RL10A-3-3A engines.

== Management ==
Christopher C. Kraft Jr., William R. Lucas, and Richard G. Smith, the directors of the Johnson Space Center, Marshall Space Flight Center and Kennedy Space Center respectively, did not like NASA Headquarters' decision to assign Shuttle-Centaur to the Lewis Research Center. In a January 1981 letter to Alan M. Lovelace, the acting Administrator of NASA, they argued that management of the Shuttle-Centaur project should instead be assigned to the Marshall Space Flight Center, which had some experience with cryogenic propellants and more experience with the Space Shuttle, which the three directors regarded as a complex system that only their centers understood.

Engineers at the Lewis Research Center saw matters differently. The director of the Lewis Research Center, John F. McCarthy Jr., wrote to Lovelace in March, providing reasons why the Lewis Research Center was the best choice: it had led the project to evaluate the feasibility of mating the Space Shuttle with Centaur; it had more experience with Centaur than any of the other NASA centers; it had developed the Centaur; managed the Titan-Centaur project in which Centaur was mated with the Titan III booster; had experience with space probes through the Surveyor, Viking and Voyager projects; and had a highly skilled workforce where the average engineer had thirteen years of experience. In May 1981, Lovelace informed Lucas of his decision to have the Lewis Research Center manage the project. In November 1982, Andrew Stofan, the director of the Lewis Research Center, and Lew Allen, the director of the JPL, signed a Memorandum of Agreement on the Galileo project; JPL was responsible for the design and management of the mission, and the Lewis Research Center for integrating the Galileo spacecraft with the Centaur and the Space Shuttle.

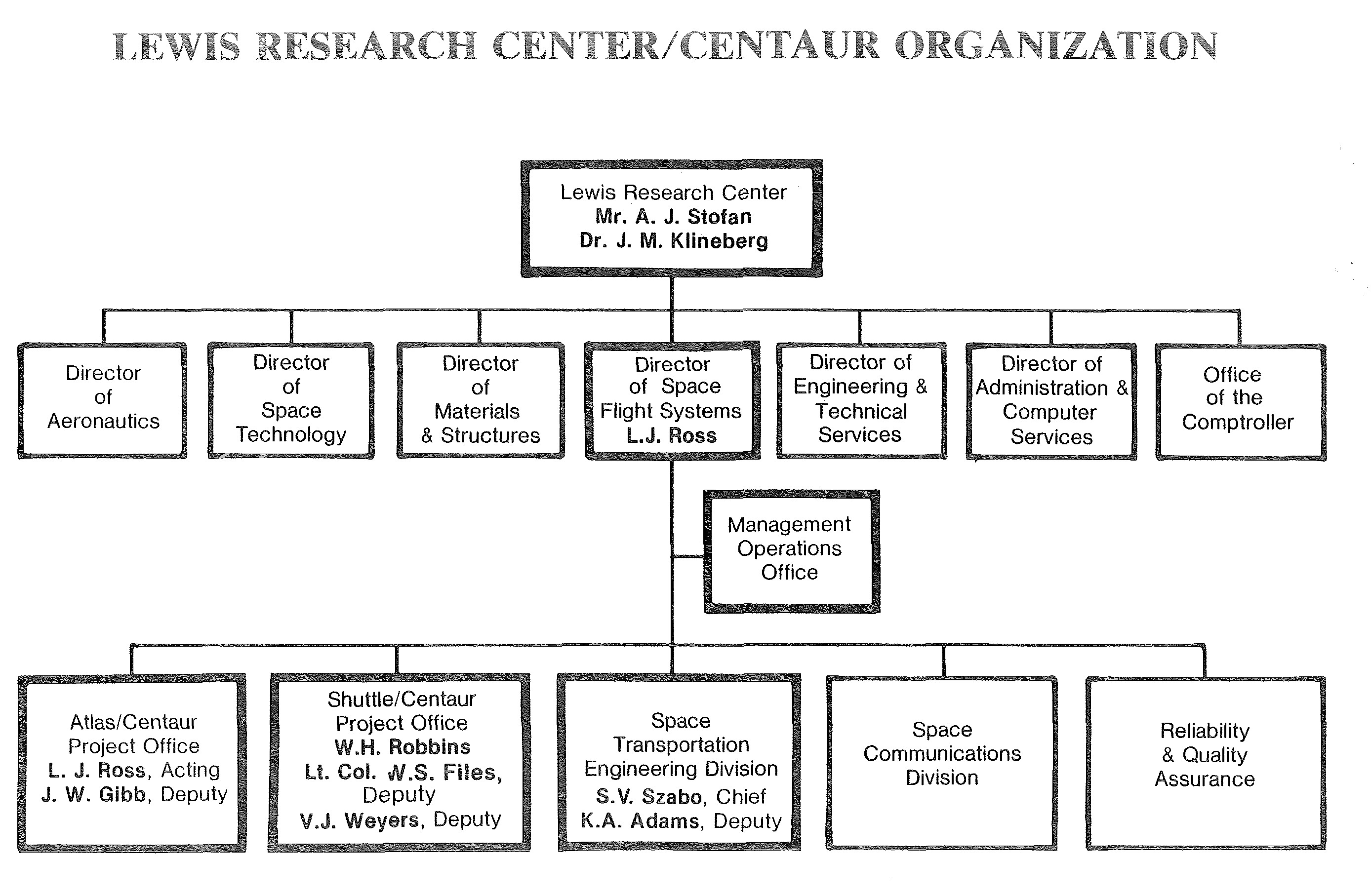
Shuttle-Centaur project organization

The future of the Lewis Research Center was uncertain in the 1970s and early 1980s. The cancellation of the NERVA nuclear rocket engine had caused a round of layoffs in the 1970s, and many of the more experienced engineers had elected to retire. Between 1971 and 1981, staff numbers fell from 4,200 to 2,690. In 1982, the staff became aware that the Reagan administration was considering closing the center, and they mounted a vigorous campaign to save it. The staff formed a committee to save the center, and began lobbying Congress. The committee enlisted Ohio Senator John Glenn and representatives Mary Rose Oakar, Howard Metzenbaum, Donald J. Pease, and Louis Stokes in their efforts to persuade Congress to keep the center open.

McCarthy retired in July 1982, and Andrew Stofan became the director of the Lewis Research Center. He was an associate administrator at NASA Headquarters, whose involvement with Centaur dated back to 1962 and who had headed the Atlas-Centaur and Titan-Centaur Offices in the 1970s. Under Stofan, the Lewis Research Center budget went from $133 million in 1979 (equivalent to $450 million 2023) to $188 million in 1985 (equivalent to $452 million in 2023). This permitted an increase in staff for the first time in 20 years, 190 new engineers being hired. In the process, the Lewis Research Center drifted away from fundamental research and became involved in the management of major projects like Shuttle-Centaur.

William H. Robbins was appointed the head of the Shuttle-Center Project Office at the Lewis Research Center in July 1983. Most of his experience was with NERVA, and this was his first experience with Centaur, but he was an experienced project manager. He handled the project's administration and financial arrangements. Vernon Weyers was his deputy. USAF Major William Files also became a deputy project manager. He brought with him six USAF officers who assumed key roles in the Project Office. Marty Winkler headed the Shuttle-Centaur program at General Dynamics. Steven V. Szabo, who had worked on Centaur since 1963, was head of the Lewis Research Center's Space Transportation Engineering Division, responsible for the technical side of the activities related to the integration of the Space Shuttle and Centaur, which included the propulsion, pressurization, structural, electrical, guidance, control and telemetry systems. Edwin Muckley was in charge of the Mission Integration Office, which was responsible for the payloads. Frank Spurlock managed trajectory mission design, and Joe Nieberding took charge of the Shuttle-Centaur group within the Space Transportation Engineering Division. Spurlock and Nieberding hired many young engineers, giving the Shuttle-Centaur project a mixture of youth and experience.

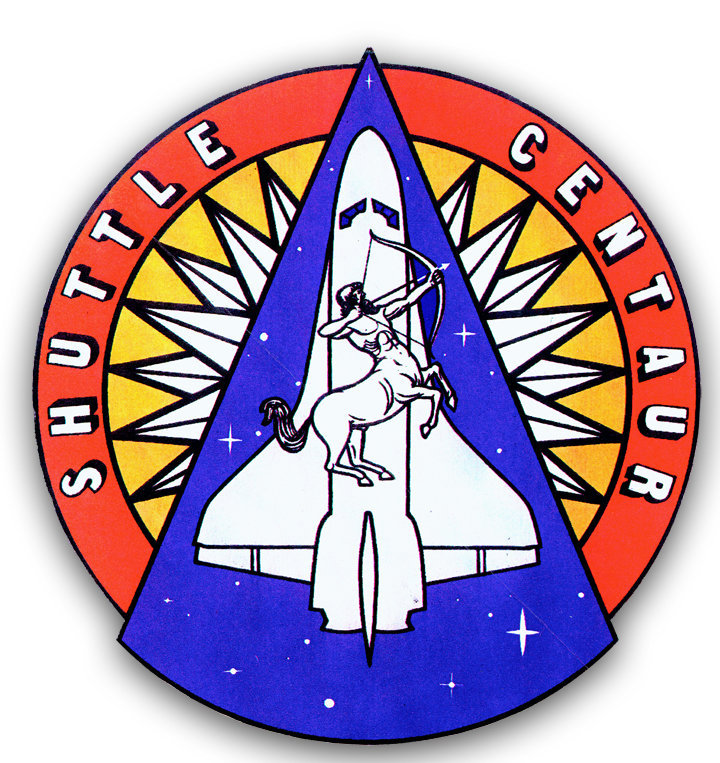
Shuttle-Centaur project logo

The Shuttle-Centaur Project had to be ready to launch in May 1986, which was just three years away. The cost of a delay was estimated at $50 million (equivalent to $118 million in 2023). Failure to meet the deadline meant waiting another year until the planets were properly aligned again. The project adopted a mission logo depicting a mythical centaur emerging from the Space Shuttle and firing an arrow at the stars. Larry Ross, the Director of Space Flight Systems at the Lewis Research Center, had the logo emblazoned on project stationery and memorabilia like drink coasters and campaign buttons. A special Shuttle-Centaur project calendar was produced, with 28 months on it, covering January 1984 to April 1986. The cover sported the logo, with the project motto, co-opted from the movie Rocky III: "Go for it!"

When it came to integrating Centaur with the Space Shuttle, there were two possible approaches: as an element or a payload. Elements were components of the Space Shuttle like the external tank and the solid rocket boosters; whereas a payload was something being carried into space like a satellite. The 1981 Memorandum of Agreement between the Johnson Space Center and the Lewis Research Center defined the Centaur as an element. The engineers at the Lewis Research Center initially preferred to have it declared a payload, because time was short and this minimized the amount of interference in their work by the Johnson Space Center. Centaur was declared to be a payload in 1983, but the drawbacks soon became evident. Payload status was originally conceived as being for inert pieces of cargo. Complying with the requirements of this status resulted in a series of safety waivers. The difficulty of compliance was compounded by the Johnson Space Center, which added more for Centaur. Both centers wanted to make the Centaur as safe as possible, but differed over what trade-offs were acceptable.

== Preparations ==
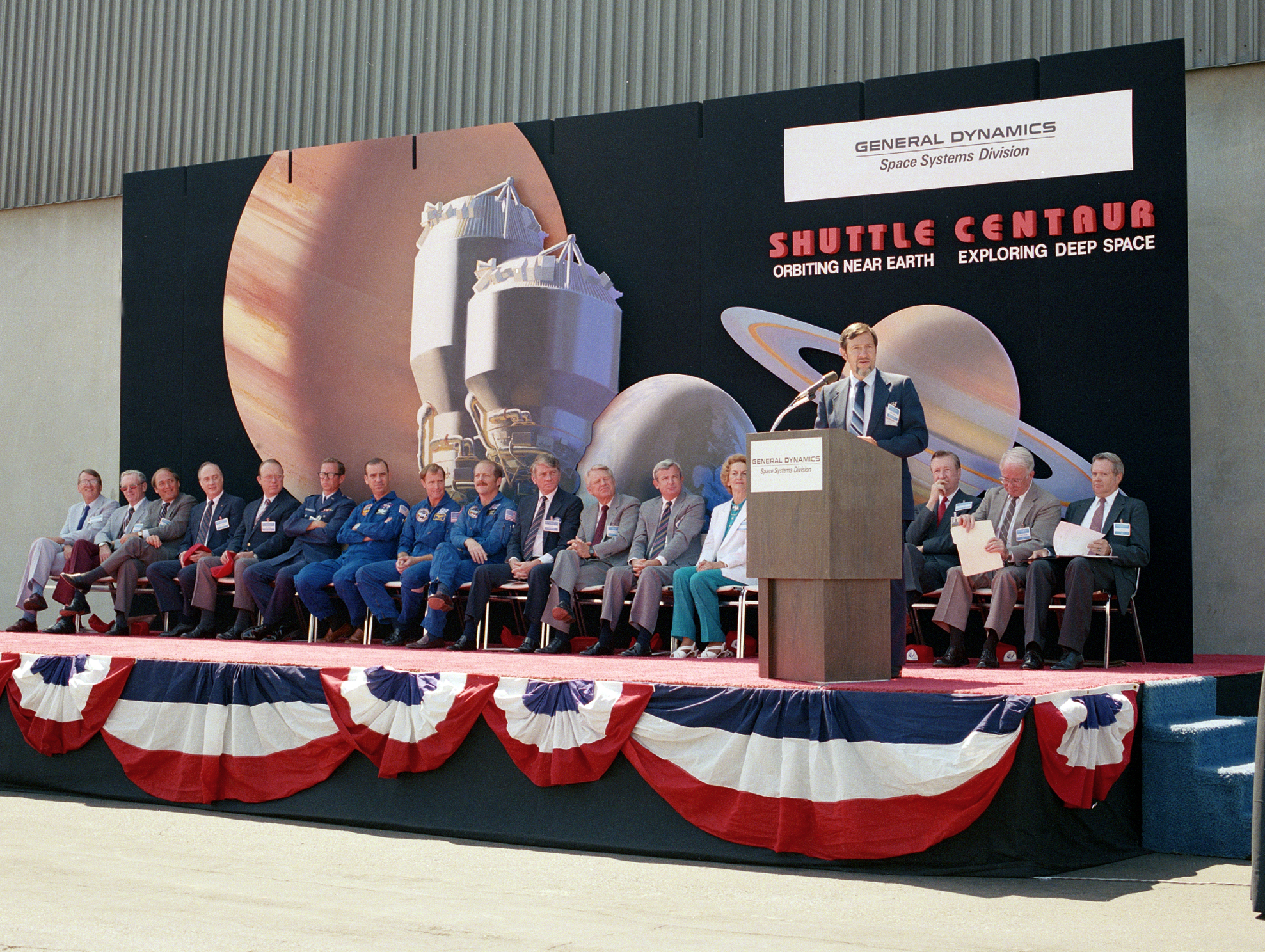
NASA Lewis Research Center director Andrew J. Stofan addresses the crowd at General Dynamics in San Diego at the rollout of SC-1

Two Shuttle-Centaur missions were scheduled: STS-61-F for Ulysses in the Space Shuttle Challenger for 15 May 1986, and STS-61-G for Galileo in the Space Shuttle Atlantis for 20 May. Crews were assigned in May 1985: STS-61-F would be commanded by Frederick Hauck, with Roy D. Bridges Jr. as the pilot and mission specialists John M. Lounge and David C. Hilmers; STS-61-G would be commanded by David M. Walker, with Ronald J. Grabe as pilot and James van Hoften and John M. Fabian, who was replaced by Norman Thagard in September, as mission specialists. As well as being the STS-61-F commander, Hauck was the Shuttle-Centaur project officer at the Astronaut Office. He and Walker attended key senior management project meetings, which was unusual for astronauts.

The four-person crews would be the smallest since STS-6 in April 1983, and they would fly into a low 170-kilometer (110 mi) orbit, which was the highest that the Space Shuttle could achieve with a fully fueled Centaur on board. Centaur would periodically vent boiling hydrogen to maintain the proper internal pressure. The high rate of hydrogen boil-off from the Centaur meant that deploying it as soon as possible was essential to ensure it had sufficient fuel. Payload deployments were not normally scheduled for the first day to allow time for astronauts who came down with space adaptation syndrome to recover. To avoid this so as to permit a deployment attempt as early as seven hours after launch, both crews were entirely composed of astronauts who had already flown in space at least once before and were known to not suffer from it.

The two launches would only have a one-hour launch window and there would be just five days between them. Because of this, two launch pads would be used: Launch Complex 39A for STS-61-G and Atlantis and Launch Complex 39B for STS-61-F and Challenger. The latter had only recently been refurbished to handle the Space Shuttle. The first Centaur G-Prime, SC-1, was rolled out from the General Dynamics factory in Kearny Mesa, San Diego, on 13 August 1985. The theme music from Star Wars was played, a crowd of 300, mostly General Dynamics employees, was in attendance, as were astronauts Fabian, Walker and Hauck, and speeches were given by dignitaries.

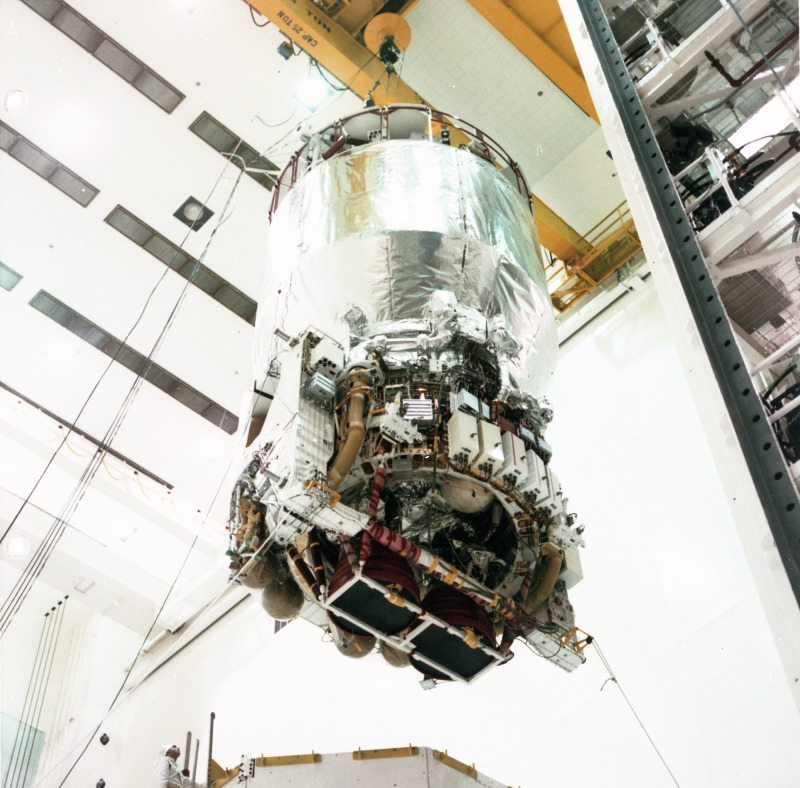
Centaur G-Prime arrives at the Shuttle Payload Integration Facility at the Kennedy Space Center

SC-1 was then flown to the Kennedy Space Center, where it was mated with CISS-1, which had arrived two months before. SC-2 and CISS-2 followed in November. The USAF made its Shuttle Payload Integration Facility at the Cape Canaveral Air Force Station available in November and December so SC-1 and SC-2 could be processed at the same time. A problem was detected with the propellant level indicator in the oxygen tank in SC-1, which was promptly redesigned, fabricated, and installed. There was also a problem with the drain valves, which was found and corrected. Shuttle-Centaur was certified as flight ready by NASA Associate Administrator Jesse Moore in November 1985.

The Johnson Space Center committed to lifting 29,000 kilograms (65,000 lb) but the engineers at Lewis Research Center were aware that the Space Shuttle was unlikely to be able to lift that amount. To compensate, the Lewis Research Center reduced the amount of propellant in the Centaur. This limited the number of possible launch days to just six. Concerned that this was too few, Nieberding gave a presentation to key management officials in which he made the case to Moore for the Space Shuttle engines to be run at 109 percent. Moore approved the request over the objections of representatives of the Marshall Space Flight Center and Johnson Space Center who were present.

The astronauts considered the Shuttle-Centaur missions to be riskiest Space Shuttle missions yet, referring to Centaur as the "Death Star". The main safety issue that concerned them involved what would happen in the case of an aborted mission, a failure of the Space Shuttle systems to put them into orbit. In that case, the crew would dump the Centaur's propellant and attempt to land. This was an extremely dangerous maneuver, but also an extremely unlikely contingency (in fact, one that would never occur in the life of the Space Shuttle program). In such an emergency, all the propellant could be drained through valves on both sides of the Space Shuttle's fuselage in 250 seconds, but their proximity to the main engines and the Orbital Maneuvering System was a concern for the astronauts, who feared fuel leaks and explosions. The Space Shuttle orbiter would then have to land with Centaur still on board, and its center of gravity would be further aft than on any previous mission.

Hauck and John Young, the astronaut who was chief of the Shuttle office, took their concerns to the Johnson Space Center Configuration Control Board, which ruled the risk acceptable. Engineers at the Lewis Research Center, the JPL and General Dynamics dismissed the astronauts' concerns about liquid hydrogen, pointing out that the Space Shuttle was propelled by liquid hydrogen and at liftoff the Space Shuttle's external tank contained 25 times the amount of fuel carried by Centaur. Surprised by the board's approval of Centaur, Hauck offered his crew the opportunity to resign from the mission with his support, but no one accepted the offer.

== Cancellation ==
On 28 January 1986, Challenger lifted off on STS-51-L. A failure of the right solid rocket booster 73 seconds into flight tore Challenger apart, resulting in the deaths of all seven crew members. The Challenger disaster was America's worst space disaster at the time. The Centaur team, many of whom witnessed the disaster, was devastated. On 20 February, Moore ordered the Galileo and Ulysses missions postponed. Too many key personnel were involved in the analysis of the accident for the two missions to proceed. They were not canceled, but the earliest they could be flown was in thirteen months. Engineers continued to perform tests and the Galileo probe was moved to the Vertical Processing Facility at the Kennedy Space Center, where it was mated with Centaur. Of the four safety reviews required of the Shuttle-Centaur missions, three had been completed, although some issues arising from the last two remained to be resolved. The final review was originally scheduled for late January. Some more safety changes had been incorporated into the Centaur Gs being built for the USAF, but had not made it to SC-1 and SC-2 owing to the strict deadline. After the disaster, $75 million (equivalent to $254 million in 2023) was earmarked for Centaur safety enhancements.

Although completely unrelated to the accident, Challenger had broken up immediately after throttling to 104 percent power. This contributed to the perception at the Johnson Space Center and Marshall Space Flight Centers that it was too risky to go to 109 percent. At the same time, the engineers at Lewis were aware that safety improvements to the Space Shuttle were likely and that this could only add more weight. Without 109 percent power, it seemed unlikely that the Shuttle could lift Centaur. In May a series of meetings were held with NASA and aerospace industry engineers at the Lewis Research Center in which the safety issues around Centaur were discussed. The meeting concluded that Centaur was reliable and safe. At one meeting at NASA Headquarters on 22 May, though, Hauck argued that Centaur posed an unacceptable degree of risk. A review by the House Appropriations Committee chaired by Boland recommended that Shuttle-Centaur be canceled. On 19 June Fletcher cancelled the project. This was only partly due to the NASA management's increased aversion to risk in the wake of the Challenger disaster. NASA management also considered the money and manpower required to get the Space Shuttle flying again and concluded that there were insufficient resources to resolve lingering problems with Shuttle-Centaur as well.

Termination letters went out to the NASA centers and to the major contractors, including General Dynamics, Honeywell, Teledyne, and Pratt & Whitney, and over 200 stop-work orders were issued. Most work was finished by 30 September, and all work was completed by the end of the year. Allowing work to continue to completion preserved the investment in technology. The NASA centers and major contractors deposited the project documentation in NASA's Centaur Engineering Data Center in September and October 1986, and the USAF purchased the flight hardware from NASA for use with Titan. NASA and the USAF had spent $472.8 million (equivalent to $1.11 billion in 2023) developing Shuttle-Centaur, and $411 million (equivalent to $969 million in 2023) on three sets of flight hardware. Shutting down the project cost another $75 million (equivalent to $177 million in 2023). Thus, a total of $959 million (equivalent to $2.26 billion in 2023) had been spent.

== Legacy ==
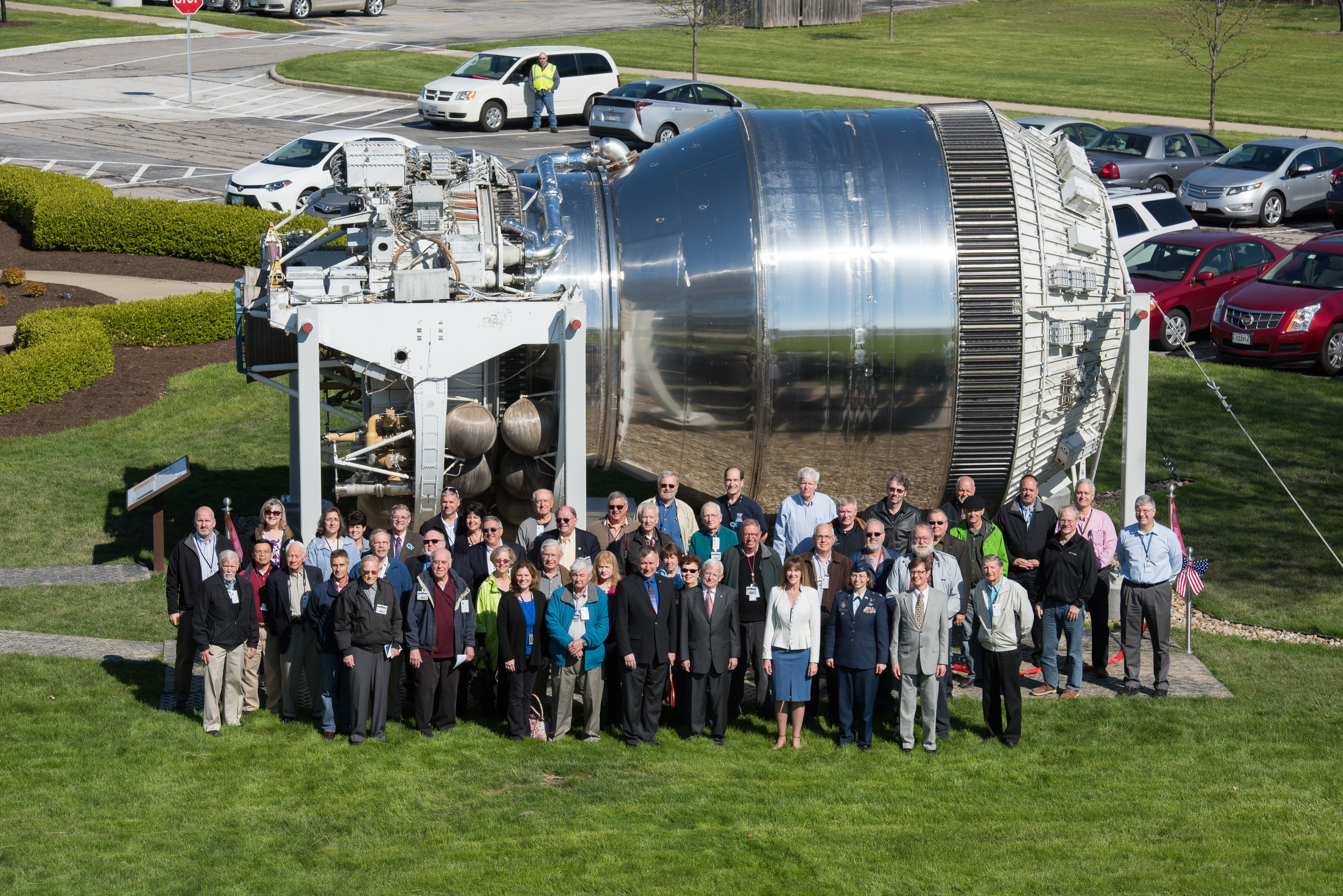
Dedication ceremony at NASA Glenn for the Centaur G-Prime display. Director Janet Kavandi is in the front row, in the blue skirt.

Galileo was not launched until 17 October 1989, on STS-34 using the IUS. The spacecraft took six years to reach Jupiter instead of two, as it had to fly by Venus and Earth twice to garner enough speed to reach Jupiter. The delay jeopardized the mission. When JPL tried to use Galileo's high gain antenna, it was found to have been damaged, most likely by vibration during overland transportation between JPL and Kennedy Space Center three times, but possibly during the rough launch by the IUS. Damage to the titanium anodized coating and the titanium dry lubricant meant that bare metal could have been touching, and in the prolonged period of time in the vacuum of space that followed it might have undergone cold welding. Whatever the cause, the antenna could not be unfolded, rendering it unusable. A low-gain antenna had to be used, dramatically reducing the amount of data the spacecraft could transmit.

The Ulysses project scientists had to wait even longer; the Ulysses spacecraft was launched using the IUS and Payload Assist Module on STS-41 on 6 October 1990.

The USAF mated the Centaur G-Prime upper stage with the Titan booster to produce Titan IV, which made its first flight in 1994. Over the next 18 years, Titan IV with Centaur G-Prime placed eighteen military satellites in orbit. In 1997 NASA used it to launch the Cassini–Huygens probe to Saturn.

A Centaur G-Prime was on display at the U.S. Space & Rocket Center in Huntsville, Alabama, for many years. In 2016, the center decided to move it to make way for a redesigned outdoor display, and it was transferred to NASA's Glenn Research Center (as the Lewis Research Center had been renamed on 1 March 1999). It was officially placed on outdoor display on 6 May 2016 after a ceremony attended by forty retired NASA and contractor staff who had worked on the rocket thirty years before, and by officials including Glenn Director Janet Kavandi, former Glenn Director Lawrence J. Ross, and the USAF's former Titan IV mission manager, Colonel Elena Oberg.
