= William H. Robbins =

Engineer

- Born: November 3, 1926; Cleveland, Ohio, US
- Died: August 22, 2009 (aged 82); Olmsted Falls, Ohio, US
- Resting place: Ohio Western Reserve National Cemetery, Seville, Ohio, US
- Education: University of Michigan (BS 1948); Case Western Reserve University (MS 1952)
- Occupation: Engineer: National Aeronautics and Space Administration
- Spouse: Lucille Shaffer
- Children: 2
- Awards: Emmy Award (1987)

William H. (Red) Robbins (November 3, 1926 – August 22, 2009) was an American engineer who worked for the National Aeronautics and Space Administration (NASA). During his long career at NASA, he worked on the NERVA nuclear rocket engine, NASA wind turbines, communication satellites, and the Shuttle-Centaur program. He accepted an Emmy Award in September 1987 on behalf of NASA for the contributions of satellite communications to the television industry.

== Early life ==
William H. Robbins was born in Cleveland, Ohio, on November 3, 1926, the son of William and Agnes Robbins. He was nicknamed "Red" for his hair color. He graduated from James Ford Rhodes High School in 1944 and served in the US Navy for three years from 1944 to 1947.

After his honorable discharge from the Navy he joined the National Advisory Committee for Aeronautics (NACA), the forerunner of the National Aeronautics and Space Administration (NASA), at what was then the Flight Propulsion Research Laboratory in Cleveland. It was renamed the Lewis Flight Propulsion Laboratory in 1948, the NASA Lewis Research Center in 1958, and the NASA Glenn Research Center in 1999. Robbins earned a Bachelor of Science degree in mechanical engineering from the University of Michigan in 1948, and a Master of Science in aeronautical engineering from Case Western Reserve University in 1952.

== NASA career ==
At Lewis, Robbins worked on jet engine components, notably the development of transonic compressors, which found widespread use. He also worked on rocket nozzles. During the 1960s, he worked on NERVA, the nuclear rocket engine intended as an upper stage to the Saturn V Moon rocket. Most of his NASA career was spent at Lewis, but in 1973 he became the experiments manager for communications satellites at NASA headquarters in Washington, D.C. He returned to Lewis the following year as project manager for the joint US-Canadian Communications Technology Satellite (CTS) project.

The satellite, subsequently renamed Hermes, was launched on January 17, 1976, and inaugurated with a color television conference between the Leis Research Center and the Communications Research Center in Ottawa, Ontario. Its transmitter was ten to twenty times as strong as earlier transmitters. This capability came from Lewis' development of traveling-wave tube technology. It returned an image of Robbins' face in a quarter of a second. In 1979 the satellite was repositioned over the Pacific Ocean and used to transmit television signals between Australia and Papua-New Guinea. In September 1987, Robbins accepted an Emmy Award on behalf of NASA for the CTS Project's contributions to the television industry.

During the energy crisis of the early 1970s, Robbins teamed up with government and private industry scientists to develop alternative energy sources. He worked on NASA wind turbines projects in the early 1980s, including the 2 MW wind turbine at Howard Knob, North Carolina, the world's largest at the time it was dedicated in 1979, and a 200 KW one in Clayton, New Mexico. In 1983 he became the head of the Shuttle-Centaur Project Office, which was responsible for the development of Centaur G and Centaur G Prime upper stages intended to launch the Galileo and Ulysses spacecraft from the Space Shuttle.

== Later life ==
After he left NASA he became a partner in Analytical Engineering, a space technology consulting firm, for ten years. In retirement he played golf at Oberlin Golf Club, and shot his first of three holes in one when he was 72. He died in a nursing home in the Cleveland suburb of Olmsted Falls on August 22, 2009, from complications from a stroke he had suffered in 2005. He was survived by his wife Lucille (née Shaffer) and sons Jeffrey and James Robbins. He was buried in Ohio Western Reserve National Cemetery, Seville, Ohio.
