= Andrew J. Stofan =

American engineer (1935–2025)

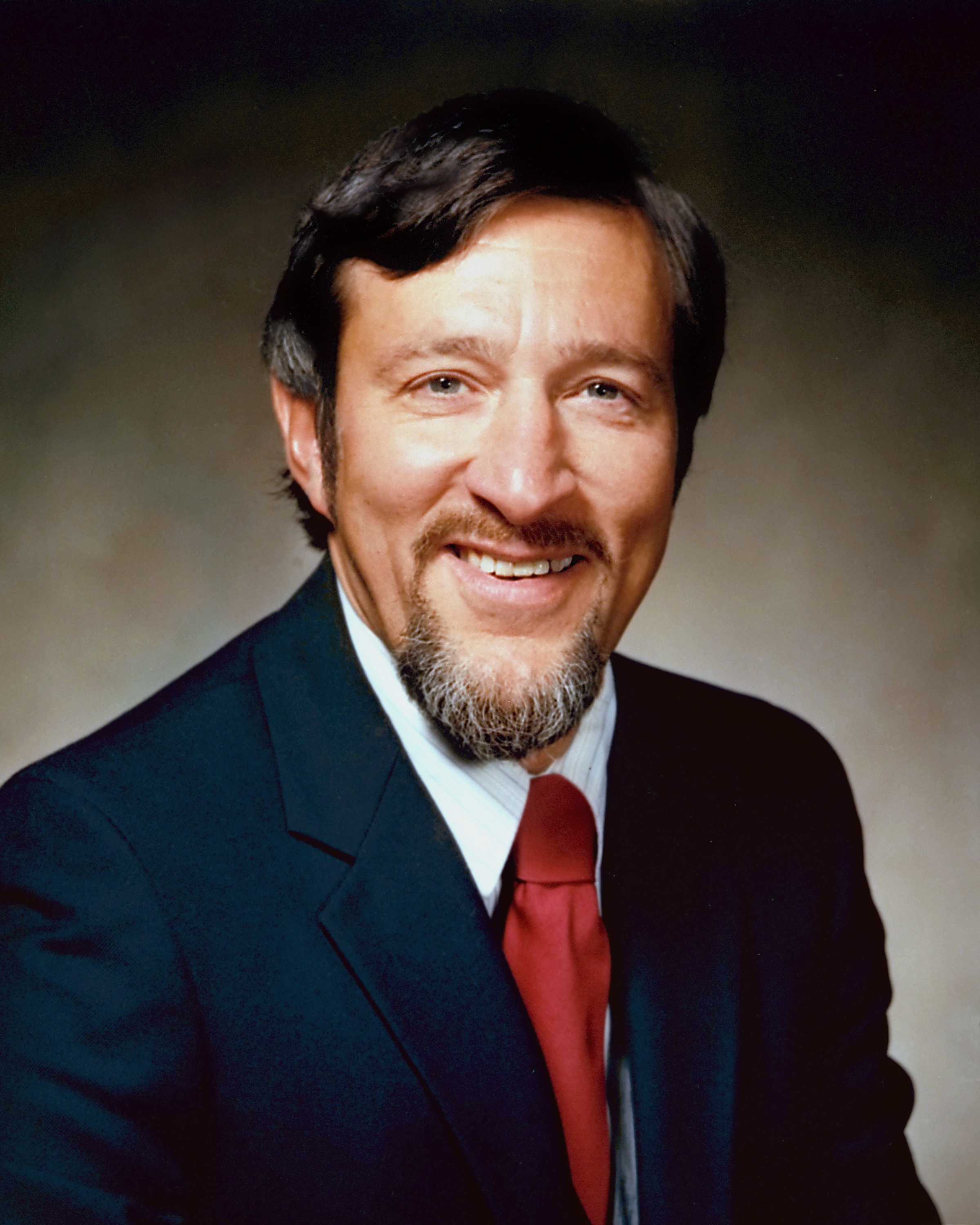
- Stofan in 1986
- Born: January 26, 1935; Cleveland, Ohio, U.S.
- Died: October 26, 2025 (aged 90); Fair Oaks, Virginia, U.S.
- Education: Hiram College (BA 1957); Carnegie Mellon University (BS 1958)
- Occupation: Engineer: National Aeronautics and Space Administration
- Spouse: Barbara Bedell
- Children: 2 (including Ellen)
- Awards: NASA Exceptional Service Medal (1975); NASA Distinguished Service Medal (1981); Meritorious Executive (1982); Distinguished Executive (1985)

Andrew John Stofan (January 26, 1935 – October 26, 2025) was an American engineer. He worked for the National Aeronautics and Space Administration (NASA) at the Lewis Research Center (now Glenn Research Center). In the 1960s he played an important role in the development of the Centaur upper stage rocket, which pioneered the use of liquid hydrogen as a propellant. In the 1970s he managed the Atlas-Centaur and Titan-Centaur Project Offices, and oversaw the launch of the Pioneer 10 and Pioneer 11 probes to Jupiter and Saturn, the Viking missions to Mars, Helios probes to the Sun, and the Voyager probes to Jupiter and the outer planets. He was director of the Lewis Research Center from 1982 to 1986.

== Early life ==
Andrew J. Stofan was born on January 26, 1935, the son of Andrew Stofan and his wife Ida (née Kelker). He entered Hiram College, from which both his parents had graduated in 1928, and where his future wife Barbara Bedell was also a student. While there he played college football, and participated in wrestling and track athletics. He received his Bachelor of Arts degree in mathematics from Hiram College in 1957, and the following year earned a Bachelor of Science degree in mechanical engineering from Carnegie Mellon University in Pittsburgh, Pennsylvania. He subsequently studied mathematics and engineering as a graduate student at Case-Western Reserve University in Cleveland, Ohio.

== NASA career ==
Stofan joined the Lewis Flight Propulsion Laboratory in 1958, shortly before it became part of the newly formed National Aeronautics and Space Administration (NASA) as the Lewis Research Center. He became a research engineer in the Propulsion Aerodynamics Division, where he researched the use of ejector nozzles in supersonic aircraft. These nozzles subsequently found use in the Lockheed SR-71 Blackbird. As NASA switched its focus from aviation to space-related technologies, he joined the Chemical Rocket Systems Branch in the new Rocket and Aerodynamics Division, where he studied slosh dynamics, the manner in which fuel sloshed about in the propellant tanks of liquid-fuel rockets. Fuel could slosh for many different reasons, and understanding these and their effects was crucial to mitigating them in order to ensure that the fuel could be pumped into the engine.

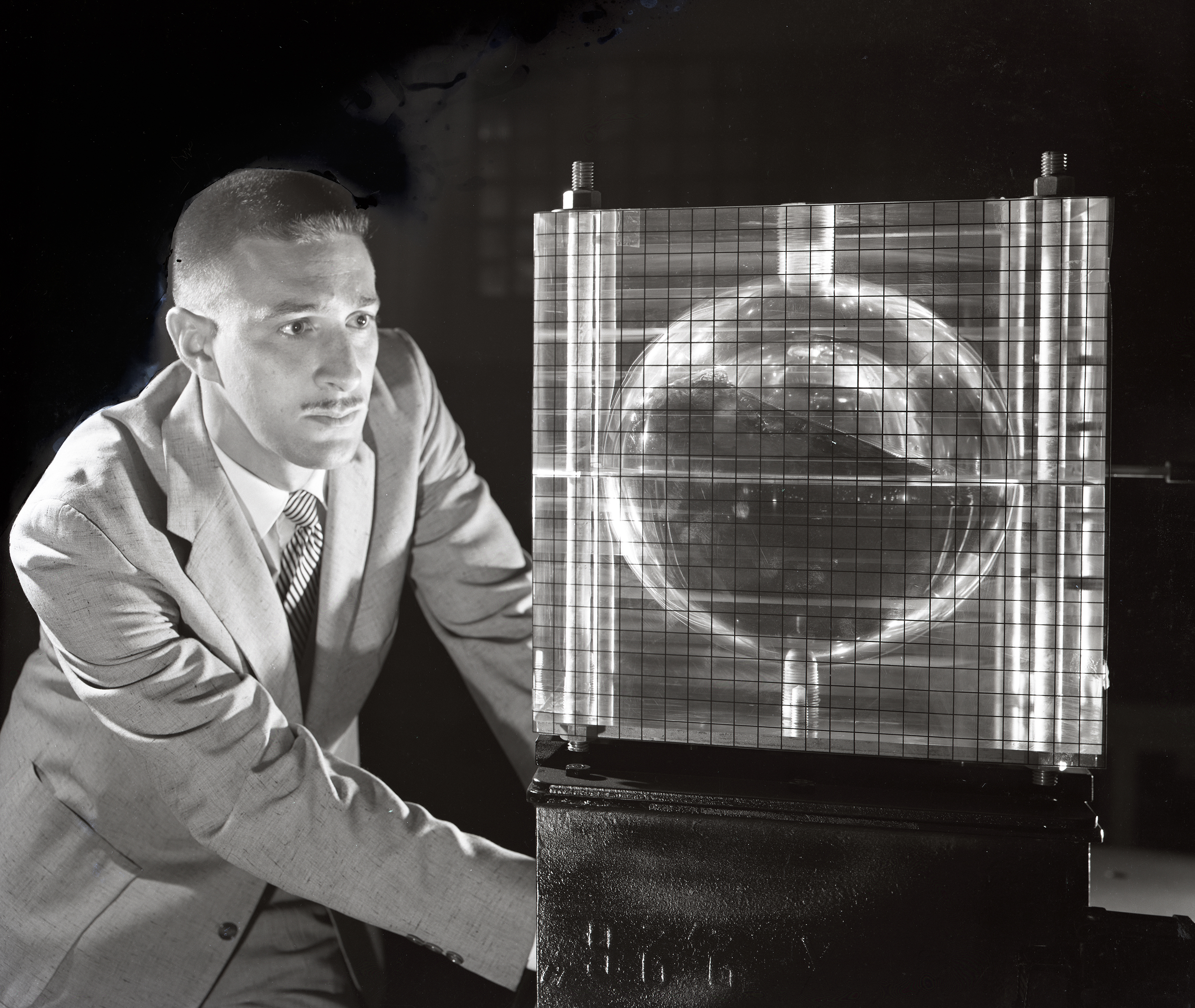
Stofan examines a small propellant tank to study fluid sloshing

Stofan's expertise with sloshing was called upon in 1962 when Lewis took on the development of the Centaur upper-stage vehicle, which was fueled with liquid hydrogen and liquid oxygen. Liquid hydrogen was a cryogenic fuel about which there was little empirical knowledge at the time. He played a key role in understanding its behavior: he helped develop internal baffles to control propellant sloshing, gauges to measure the boiling of cryogenic propellants, and a propellant utilization system that ensured that the liquid hydrogen and liquid oxygen would run out at precisely the same time, thereby ensuring that neither was wasted. Centaur upper stages were used atop Atlas-Centaur rockets by the Surveyor program, which sent robotic spacecraft to the Moon.

Stofan became the head of the Propellant Systems Section in 1966. He tackled the problem of understanding the behavior of liquid hydrogen propellant in microgravity. This was important not just for Centaur, but for the Saturn V rocket that took the first men to the Moon, for it also used liquid hydrogen in its upper stages. The following year, he was the Project Manager of a test program that investigated the Centaur's booster pump, which increased the pressure of the propellant flowing to the engine. Centaur was tested with a full-scale hot firing in the vacuum test facility at Lewis's Plum Brook Station. It was found that the booster pumps were unnecessary, and they were subsequently removed from the design.

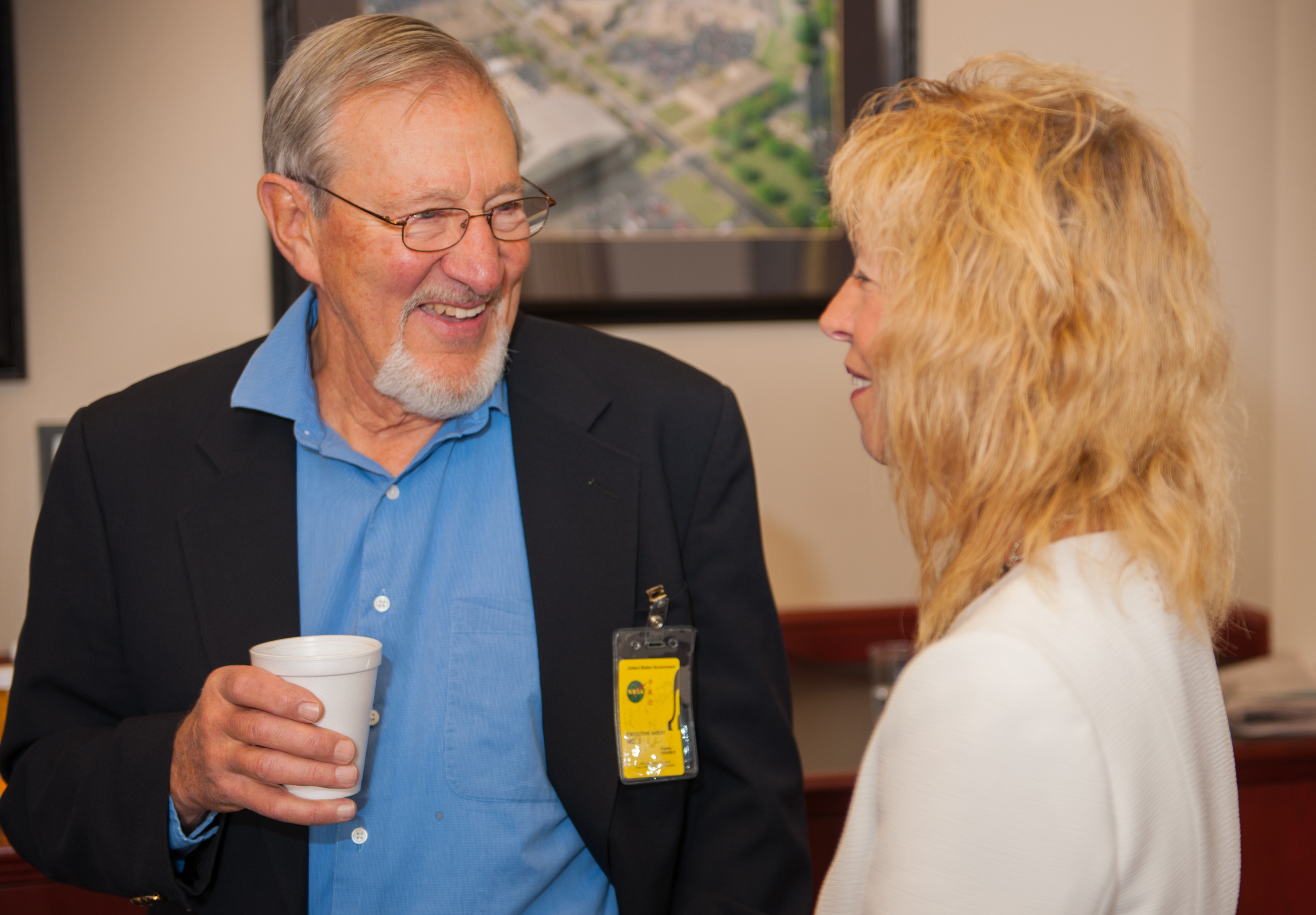
Stofan chats with Glenn Research Center Associate Director Janet L. Watkins at a Centaur 50th-anniversary event in 2013.

In 1969, Stofan became the Assistant Project Manager for Improved Centaur. This project involved mating the Centaur with the more powerful Titan rocket family. As Manager of the Titan-Centaur Project Office from 1970 to 1974, he oversaw the integration of Titan and Centaur, and was in charge of the Titan-Centaur Proof Flight (TC-1) in February 1974. From 1974 to 1978 he was head of the Launch Vehicles Directorate, responsible for both the Titan-Centaur and Atlas-Centaur offices. He directed the design and engineering of the launch vehicles, and coordinated relations with Air Force, aerospace industry teams, and mission planners. In these years, ten Atlas-Centaur and six Titan-Centaur missions were carried out, including the Pioneer 10 and Pioneer 11 probes to Jupiter and Saturn, the Viking missions to Mars, Helios probes to the Sun, and the Voyager probes to Jupiter and the outer planets.

Stofan became Deputy Associate Administrator for the Office of Space Science at NASA Headquarters in 1978, but returned to the Lewis Research Center as its director in 1982. Lewis had suffered badly from budget cuts and layoffs in the 1970s, and morale was low. There were even fears that the center might close. Stofan brought in new projects, including the Shuttle-Centaur and the Space Station power system. He went back to NASA headquarters in 1986 to head the Space Station Office, directing the design of the Space Station Freedom. He retired from NASA on April 1, 1988. For his services, he had received the NASA Exceptional Service Medal in 1975 and the NASA Distinguished Service Medal in 1981. He also received the Presidential Rank Awards of Meritorious Executive in 1982 and Distinguished Executive in 1985.

== Later life and death ==
After retiring from NASA in 1988, Stofan joined Martin Marietta Astronautics as its vice president of Advanced Launch Systems and Technical Operations. In 1991 he returned to Cleveland as the president of Analex Corporation, a firm established and run by ex-NASA employees who provided engineering and management expertise to US agencies. He later served as director of Electro-Optical Systems at Lockheed Missiles and Space Company. His daughter, Ellen Stofan, served as Chief Scientist at NASA, director of the National Air and Space Museum, and Under Secretary for Science and Research at the Smithsonian Institution.

Stofan died in Fair Oaks, Virginia, on October 26, 2025, at the age of 90.
