= Ellen Stofan =

Planetary geologist and NASA scientist

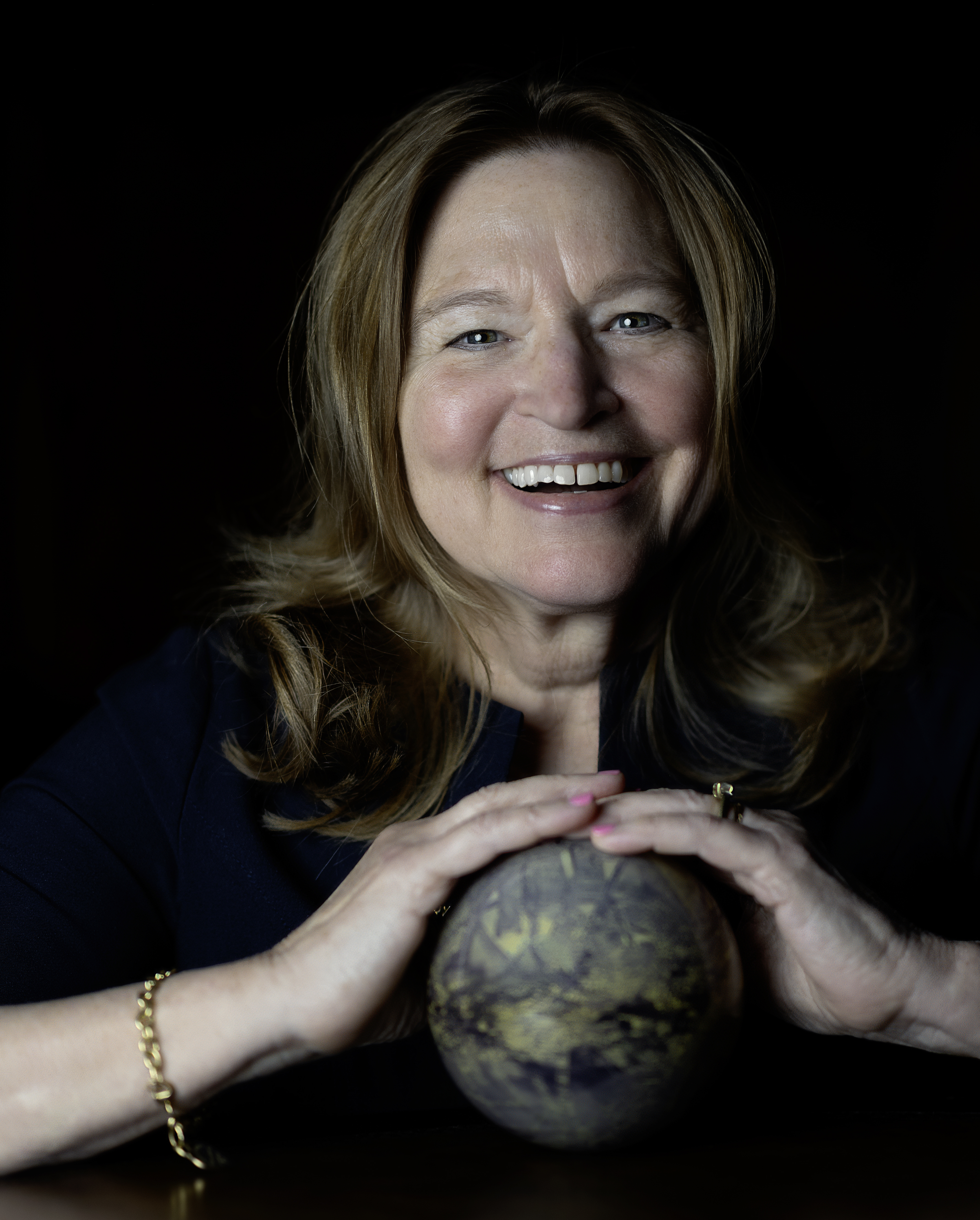
- Stofan in 2026
- Born: February 24, 1961 (age 65); Oberlin, Ohio, U.S.
- Education: College of William & Mary (BS); Brown University (MS, PhD)
- Awards: Presidential Early Career Award for Scientists and Engineers
- Scientific career
- Fields: Planetary science
- Workplaces: NASA, Smithsonian

Ellen Renee Stofan (born February 24, 1961) is Under Secretary for Science and Research at The Smithsonian and was previously the Director of the National Air and Space Museum.

As a planetary geologist, Stofan served as Chief Scientist of NASA and as principal advisor to NASA Administrator Charles Bolden on the agency's science programs, planning and investments. Previously, she was vice president of Proxemy Research in Laytonsville, Maryland, and as an honorary professor in the Earth sciences department at the University College London.

== Early life and education ==
Ellen Stofan is the daughter of Andrew J. Stofan, a rocket engineer who worked for NASA in a number of roles including director of the NASA Lewis Research Center and associate administrator for NASA's Space Station Office.

Ellen Stofan received her Bachelor of Science degree in geology from the College of William & Mary in 1983 and went on to earn masters and doctorate degrees from Brown University. Her doctoral thesis, accepted in 1989, was titled "Geology of coronae and domal structures on Venus and models of their origin."

== Career ==
Stofan's research has focused on the geology of Venus, Mars, Saturn's moon Titan, and Earth. She is an associate member of the Cassini mission to Saturn Radar Team and a co-investigator on the Mars Express Mission's MARSIS sounder. She was also the principal investigator on the Titan Mare Explorer, a proposed mission for a floating lander to be sent to Titan. From 1991 through 2000, she held a number of senior scientist positions at NASA's Jet Propulsion Laboratory in Pasadena, California, including chief scientist for NASA's New Millennium Program, deputy project scientist for the Magellan Mission to Venus, and experiment scientist for Spaceborne Imaging Radar-C (SIR-C), an instrument that provided radar images of Earth on two Space Shuttle flights in 1994. Stofan has written and published numerous professional papers, books and book chapters, and has chaired committees including the National Academy's Inner Planets Panel for the 2009-2011 Planetary Science Decadal Survey and the Venus Exploration Analysis Group.

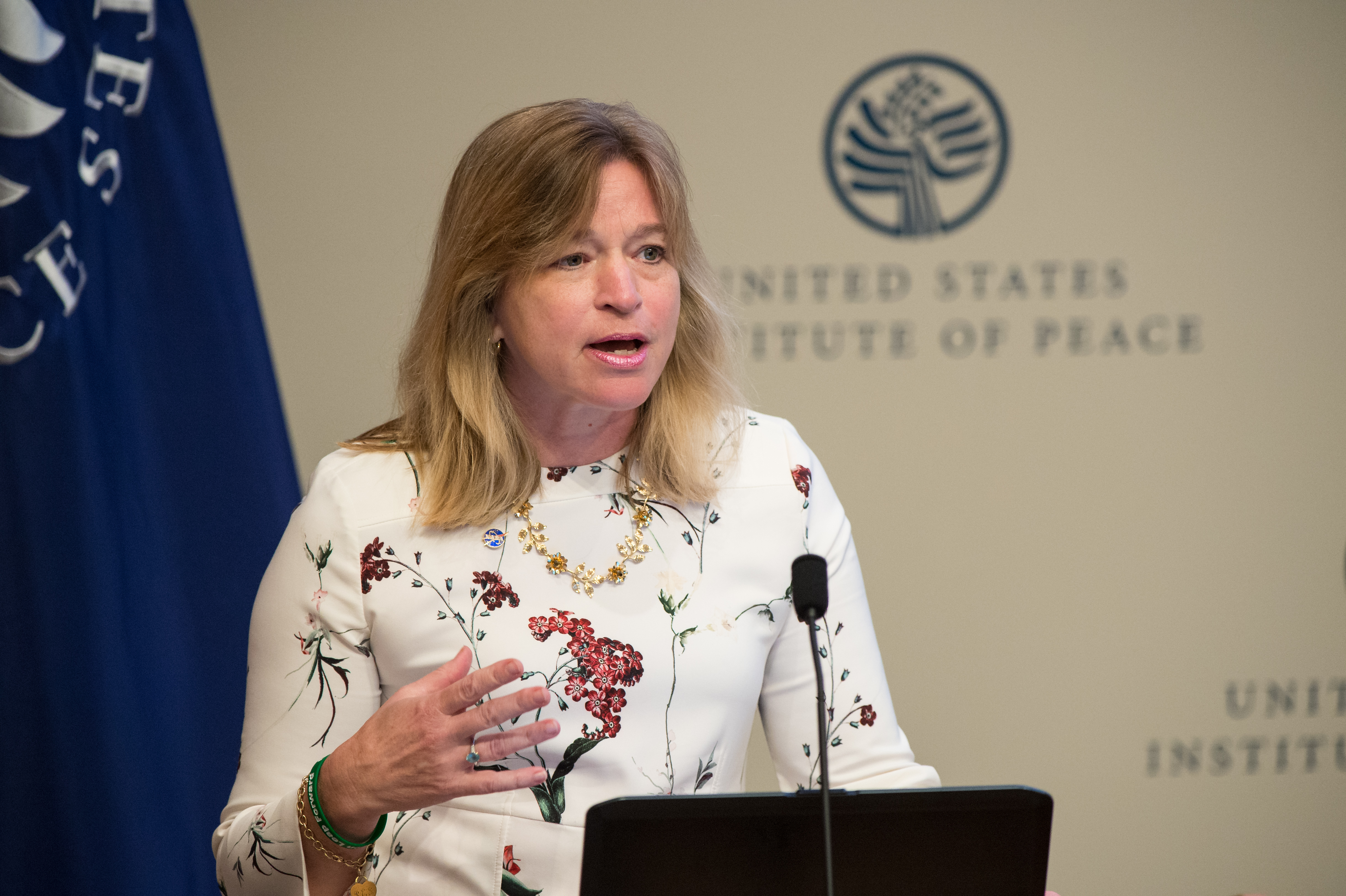
Stofan in 2015

She began her tenure in April 2018 as the John and Adrienne Mars Director of the National Air and Space Museum and was the first female Director of the museum.

In November 2020, Stofan was named a member of the Joe Biden presidential transition Agency Review Team to support transition efforts related to the National Aeronautics and Space Administration. In March 2021, she became the Under Secretary for Science and Research at The Smithsonian.

== Board memberships ==
Stofan served as chair and co-chair of the William & Mary Foundation Board for 10 years. She subsequently served as co-chair of the World Economic Forum’s Global Future Council on Space Technologies. In August 2020, she was named to the Board of Trustees of the National Geographic Society.

== Awards and honors ==
Among her many awards, Stofan received the Presidential Early Career Award for Scientists and Engineers (PECASE) in 1996. In 2022, the asteroid 328677 Stofan was named in her honor.

- Honorary Doctor of Science, University of Iowa, 2020
- Honorary Doctor of Science, Worcester Polytechnic Institute, 2019
- Honorary Doctor of Science, Washington & Jefferson College, 2016
- Honorary Doctor of Science, College of William & Mary, 2016
- Fellow, American Association for the Advancement of Science, 2023

== Selected publications ==
- Stofan, Ellen; Cravens, Thomas E.; Esposito, Larry W., eds. (2007). Exploring Venus as a Terrestrial Planet. American Geophysical Union.
- Stofan, Ellen; Jones, Tom (2008). Planetology: Unlocking the Secrets of the Solar System. National Geographic. ISBN 978-1-4262-0121-9.

== See also ==
- List of women in leadership positions on astronomical instrumentation projects
