= KTDU-80 =

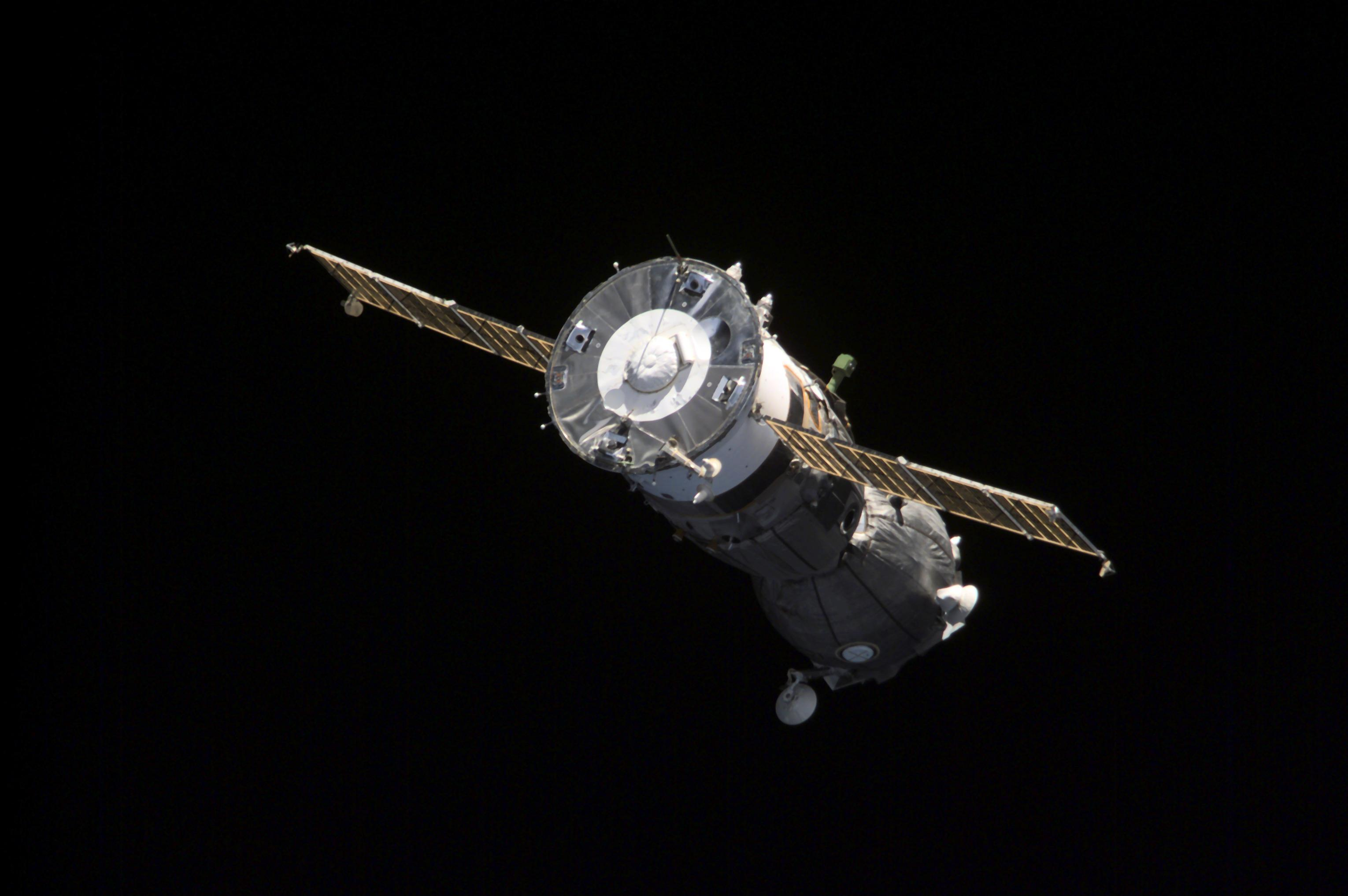
- Soyuz TM-32 departing the ISS with its SKD nozzle cover closed
- Country of origin: Russia
- Manufacturer: KB KhIMMASH
- Predecessor: KTDU-35
- Status: In production

Liquid-fuel engine
- Propellant: N_{2}O_{4} / UDMH
- Cycle: Pressure fed

Performance
- Thrust: 2.95 kN
- Chamber pressure: 880 kPa
- Specific impulse: 302 s
- Burn time: 890 s
- Gimbal range: 5

Dimensions
- Length: 1.2m
- Diameter: 2.1m

Used in
- Soyuz, Progress

The KTDU-80 (Russian: Корректирующе-Тормозная Двигательная Установка, КТДУ) is the latest of a family of integrated propulsion system that KB KhIMMASH has implemented for the Soyuz since the Soyuz-T. It integrates main propulsion, RCS and attitude control in a single system pressure fed from a common dual string redundant pressurized propellant system. The common propellant is UDMH and N_{2}O_{4} and the main propulsion unit is the S5.80 main engine. It generates 2.95 kN (660 lbf) of thrust with a chamber pressure of 880 kPa (128 psi) and a nozzle expansion of 153.8 that enables it to achieve a specific impulse of 302 s (2.96 km/s). It is rated for 30 starts with a total firing time of 890 seconds. The integrated system without the pressurization or tanks weighs 310 kg (680 lb); it is 1.2 m (47 in) long with a diameter of 2.1 m (83 in).

== Description ==
The KTDU-80 system integrates a dual string redundant propellant and pressurization system, a main propulsion system (the SKD), an RCS (the DPO-B) and an attitude control system (the DPO-M). All the propulsion elements are pressure fed rocket engines burning UDMH and N_{2}O_{4} with a common supply of pressurized propellant. Mechanically, the KTDU-80 is separated in two sections:

- Basic Unit (BB) (Russian: ББ, Базовый Блок): It is the main propulsion and includes all propellant pressurization and storage system. It is subdivided into three subsystems:
  - Pneumatic Pressurization System: It is the system that keeps all tanks and lines pressurized and guarantees the correct working pressure is maintained in the storage and the propulsion subsystems. Given the use of pressure fed engines, this subsystem is critical and a failure could mean that the crew is kept stranded in space.
  - Propellant Supply System: It which ensures propellant supply to the Orbital Maneuver Engines. Includes storage and propellant distribution.
  - Orbital Maneuver Engine (SKD) (Russian: ББ, Сближающе-корректирующий двигатель (СКД)):
- Berthing/Attitude Control Thruster Subsystem (DPO) (Russian: ДПО, Подсистема двигателей причаливания и ориентации): It is reaction and attitude control system. It is composed of two subsystems:
  - The redundant propellant supply subsystem.
  - The Berthing/Attitude Control Thrusters (DPO) (Russian: ДПО, Двигатели причаливания и ориентации): These are all the thrusters used to control the attitude and translation movements. It has two different sets of thrusters:
    - High thrust thrusters (DPO-B) (Russian: ДПО-Б): These are used for attitude, translation, docking and undocking maneuvers and as backup de-orbit engine.
    - Low thrust thrusters (DPO-M) (Russian: ДПО-М): These are used exclusively for attitude control.

Each subsystem is described in the following sections.

=== Pneumatic Pressurization System ===
The Pneumatic Pressurization System has three main functions:

1. Storage of high pressure He gas.
2. Supply of operational pressure for propellant tank ullage.
3. Supply of operating pressure for the actuation of the pneumatically activated valves of the main propulsion (SKD).

The system has four spherical pressurizing gas tanks in two separated circuits. Each circuit connects two tanks, and has its individual pressure transducer, valves, pressure regulator and electrically actuated valves. The circuits are separated by two squib actuated valves that enable to share both circuits, to use a single one, or to use both systems independently. The Helium is stored initially at 34.32 MPa (4,978 psi) and is regulated to 1.75 MPa (254 psi), with a maximum pressure of 2.15 MPa (312 psi) and a minimum of 1.37 MPa (199 psi), which is the minimum required pressure to activate the pneumatically actuated valves of the SKD.

=== Propellant Supply ===
The propellant supply subsystem function is to guarantee the supply of propellant within the required operating parameters of the engines. It uses two tanks of fuel and two of oxidizer in two separate circuits. It is separated into three propellant feed circuits:

1. Main Propulsion (SKD) circuit: it supplies the SKD (S5.80 main engine) through a series of pneumatically actuated valves through two redundant lines.
2. First DPO circuit: it supplies all high thrust thrusters (originally 14 DPO-B, later 16) and half of the low thrust thrusters (six DPO-M) through a line controlled by electro-hydraulic actuated valves.
3. Second DPO circuit: it supplies propellant to the other half (six DPO-M) of the low thrust thrusters, also through electro-hydraulic actuated valves.

The first and second DPO circuits are connected through electro-hydraulic actuated valves that enable the transfer of propellant between line in case of failure of one pressurization or propellant storage circuit. So the system has dual and redundant circuits at all its stages. The total propellant load can vary between 440 kg (970 lb) and 892 kg (1,967 lb).

=== Main Propulsion (SKD) ===
Its main propulsion unit, uses the single S5.80 main engine (SKD). It is mounted on an electro mechanically actuated gimbal that enables it to rotate ±5° in pitch and yaw. It also has an electro mechanically actuated engine nozzle cover that takes 15 seconds to open and 25 seconds to close. All the propellant supply has redundant circuits. The S5.80 generates 2.95 kN (660 lbf) of thrust with a chamber pressure of 0.88 MPa (128 psi) and a nozzle expansion of 153.8 that enables it to achieve a specific impulse of 302 s (2.96 km/s). It is rated for 30 starts with a total firing time of 890 seconds.

=== Berthing/Attitude Control Thrusters (DPO) ===
The berthing and attitude control thruster subsystem is composed of two types of thrusters:

1. The high thrust DPO-B (Russian: ДПО-Б): The original KTDU-426 used the 11D428 (manufacturer's designation RDMT-135). KTDU-80 initially used the 11D428A, later version use the improved efficiency 11D428A-16. All versions have been supplied by NIIMash. Since the original KTDU-426 until Soyuz TMA-4 the KTDU used 14 DPO-B. Since Soyuz TMA-5 and all Soyuz-TMA-M have used 16 DPO-B thrusters. These can be used for docking and un-docking maneuvers, for attitude control and, in case of SKD main engine failure, for de-orbit burn. When used in that function, they are called DPO-BT (Russian: ДПО-Бт). The 11D428A-16 generates 129.16 N (29.04 lbf) of thrust with an inlet pressure of 1.76 MPa (255 psi) and achieves a specific impulse of 291 s (2.85 km/s). It is rated for 500,000 ignitions with a total maximum burn duration of 2,000 seconds.
2. The low thrust DPO-M (Russian: ДПО-М): KTDU-426 used the 11D427, and KTDU-80 initially used the improved 11D427M but later versions changed to S5.142 (manufacturer's name DST-25). The DPO-M can only be used for attitude control. The S5.142 generates 25 N (5.6 lbf) of thrust with a chamber pressure of 0.8 MPa (120 psi) and achieves a specific impulse of 285 s (2.79 km/s). It is rated for 300,000 ignitions with a total firing time of 25,000 seconds.

== History ==
The original Soyuz had a separated orbital correction system (KTDU-35) from its orientation system. The latter, integrated a reaction control system called DPO and the attitude control system, called DO. The KTDU-35 had a main orbit correction engine SKD, the S5.60 and a backup orbital correction engine DKD, the S5.35. These two were gas generator engines burning UDMH and AK27I. The DPO and DO thrusters, on the other hand, were monopropellant pressure fed rockets that used catalytic decomposition of H_{2}O_{2} to generate thrust. Having such dissimilar systems with different cycles, propellant, and feed systems added failure modes and required heavy backup equipment, like the backup de-orbit engine, the S5.35.

For the Soyuz-T (first flight during 1979), Isayev's OKB-2 developed for TsKBEM an integrated propulsion system, the KTDU-426. One advantage of this system is that since the DPO could be used as backup of the main propulsion for orbit correction and de-orbit maneuvers, there was no need of adding a backup main propulsion (the DKD S5.35 in the previous system). But more importantly they could implement more extensive redundancy while keeping the mass of the system down. And by switching all the engines to the same propellant, all reserves could be consolidating reducing mass further. They also switched to a more efficient and storable propellant UDMH and N_{2}O_{4}, which improved performance further. The reentry capsule attitude control system, still uses catalytic decomposition of H_{2}O_{2}, but that is a completely separate system.

For this version of the KTDU, they used the pressure fed cycle for all rocket engines, and consolidated propellants on the UDMH/N_{2}O_{4} combination, which gives superior density and specific impulse and can be stored for years in space. For the orbital correction engine (SKD), they developed the 11D426. That while less powerful than the S5.60 (3.09 kN (690 lbf) versus 4.09 kN (920 lbf)), it improved efficiency with a specific impulse of 292 seconds (the S5.60 had 278s). Also, the switch to pressure fed cycle eliminated the use of turbopumps and its associated cost and reliability issues. And it also enabled the reduction in minimum burn time and engine transients since there was no turbine start up and shut down hysteresis.

For the new and improved high thrust RCS (DPO-B), known as the 11D428, they kept the use of 14 thrusters, but instead of H_{2}O_{2} monopropellant they used the same cycle and propellant as the 11D426 SKD. They also increase the thrust from the previous 98 N (22 lbf) to 137.2 N (30.8 lbf). This enabled the DPO-B to act as backup engine for the de-orbit maneuver, which eliminated the need for the backup de-orbit engine (the DKD), further simplifying the system. For the low thrust attitude control system (DPO-M), they used the new 11D427. The number of engines was increased from 8 to 12, and thrust augmented from 14.7 N (3.3 lbf) to 24.5 N (5.5 lbf).

The introduction of the Soyuz-TM in 1986 saw a new revision of the propulsion system, the KTDU-80. It was an evolutionary revision of the KTDU-426 system, rather and a revolutionary transition like the one done from the KTDU-35. The propellant supply subsystem switched to metallic diaphragms for the tank pressurization. The SKD main engine was changed to the new S5.80. While slightly less powerful than the 11D426 with 2.95 kN (660 lbf), specific impulse increased to 302 s (2.96 km/s) and total burn time increased from 570 seconds to 890. The low thrust DPO-M initially used the 11D427M, an uprated version of the 11D427 that increased thrust to 26.5 N (6.0 lbf). But due to manufacturability issues, those were later changed (by Soyuz TM-23) to the S5.142 (manufacturer's name DST-25). Since the S5.142 lack a pressure transducer on its main combustion chamber, the avionics had to be modified. On the other hand, this change enabled the DPO-B to keep the PAO away from the reentry capsule after separation.

The high thrust DPO-B system initially kept the 11D428A used on the KTDU-426. Since the DPO-B also act as the backup engine for the main SKD, they always have to keep a reserve of propellant in case of SKD failure that is dead weight. Thus a project to develop a more efficient version, the 11D428A-16 was started in 1993. During a series of flights (M-36, M-37 and M-38) Progress-M flew with a partial set of 11D428A-16. By Progress M-39 it flew with a full set of 11D428A-16, and finally Soyuz TM-28 marked the debut of the switch to 11D428A-16 for the crewed craft, which meant a saving of 30 kg (66 lb).

The International Space Station experience brought some further changes. Experience had shown that during docking operations, only two DPO-B were available for abort operations. Thus, on October 23, 2002 a project was formally started to add two additional DPO-B, which brought the total number of high thrust DPO engines to 16. Soyuz TMA-5 was the first spacecraft to fly with this new configuration. With Soyuz TMA-11M debuted a new arrangement of the DPO-B thrusters. But this is a spacecraft specific configuration and does not mean any changes to the KTDU-80 per se.

The new Soyuz-MS and Progress-MS spacecraft have an evolution of the KTDU-80. Now all 28 thrusters are the high thrust DPO-B, arranged in 14 pairs. Each propellant supply circuit handles 14 DPO-B, with each element of each thruster pair being fed by a different circuit. This provides full fault tolerance for thruster or propellant circuit failure.

== Versions ==
This engine has had two main variations:

- KTDU-426 (GRAU Index 11D426): This was the original version developed for the Soyuz-T that replaced the KTDU-35 of the previous generation Soyuz. It integrated into the KTDU unit, the reaction control system (DPO), the attitude control (DO) and the main propulsion (SKD and DKD) into a single system. The new arrangement enabled the use of the DPO as backup for de-orbit engine, and thus the DKD was eliminated. The SKD used the new 11D426, that while it had less thrust, it had better specific impulse, and thus reducing overall mass. The same elements were used on the S5.79 space station propulsion.
- KTDU-80: Developed between 1968 and 1974 years for the Soyuz-TM, it is still used with slight changes on the Soyuz-TMA-M. For the tanks they switched to a metallic diaphragm for pressurization. The SKD main engine was changed to the more efficient S5.80. Initially they used the improved 11D427M for DPO-M, but by Soyuz TM-23 they switched models to the S5.142 for manufacturability reasons. Initially the 11D428A was used as the DPO-B. But has been changed to the 11D428A-16 to reduce dead weight. Since Soyuz TMA-5, two additional DPO-B were added to double the thrust in case of an abort during docking maneuvers.
- KTDU-80 (Soyuz MS): While as of June 2016 it is not known if it is still called KTDU-80, the Soyuz-MS and Progress-MS version of the propulsion system has replaced all DPO-M with DPO-B, and now the pressurization and propellant feeds circuits are fully symmetrical with 14 DPO-B each.

== See also ==
- S5.80 - Main propulsion engine (SKD).
- 11D428A - Reaction control system high thrust engine (DPO-B).
- S5.142 - Latest reaction control system low thrust engine (DPO-M).
- KTDU-35 - Previous version of the Soyuz propulsion system.
- KB KhIMMASH - Developer and manufacturer of the KTDU.
- NIIMash - Developer of the DPO-M 11D428A-16.
- Soyuz (spacecraft) - The family of spacecraft that are integrated with this system.
- Soyuz-T - Soyuz version that used the KTDU-426.
- Soyuz-TM - Soyuz version that inaugurated the KTDU-80.
- Soyuz-MS - Soyuz version with a significantly different KTDU-80.
