= 11D428 =

Model of Soviet liquid pressure-fed rocket engine

11D428A-16
- Country of origin: Russia
- Date: 1993–1997
- First flight: 1997-10-05 (Progress M-36)
- Designer: NIIMash
- Application: RCS thruster
- Predecessor: 11D428A
- Successor: 11D428AF-16
- Status: In Production

Liquid-fuel engine
- Propellant: N_{2}O_{4} / UDMH
- Mixture ratio: 1.85±0.15
- Cycle: pressure fed

Configuration
- Chamber: 1

Performance
- Thrust, vacuum: 129.16 N (29.04 lbf)
- Chamber pressure: 0.88 MPa (128 psi)
- Specific impulse, vacuum: 291 s (2.85 km/s)
- Restarts: 500,000

Dimensions
- Dry mass: 1.5 kg (3.3 lb)

Used in
- Soyuz since Soyuz TM-28 and Progress since Progress M-36

The 11D428A-16 (manufacturer's name RDMT-135M) is a liquid pressure-fed rocket engine burning N_{2}O_{4}/UDMH with an O/F of 1.85. It is used for crew-rated spacecraft propulsion applications. It is currently used in the KTDU-80 spacecraft propulsion module. The previous version, the 11D428A (manufacturer's name RDMT-135) is still used as the reaction control system thrusters of the Zvezda ISS module. The 11D428A-16 generates 129.16 N (29.04 lbf) of thrust with a chamber pressure of 0.88 MPa (128 psi) and achieves a specific impulse of 291 s (2.85 km/s). It is rated for 500,000 starts with a certified ignition time of 0.03 seconds to 2000 seconds. Each unit weights 1.5 kg (3.3 lb).

== Versions ==
This engine has been used with certain variations in the crewed Russian space program since the Salyut 6 in Soviet times. The three main versions are:

- 11D428: Delivered in 1970 for use in Salyut 1.
- 11D428M: Version developed for the Yantar-2K platform. It reached space on the first launch, Kosmos 697 on August 6, 1974.
- 11D428A (AKA RDMT-135): Version developed for the Soyuz 7K-S, it flew on Kosmos 670, Kosmos 772 and Kosmos 869. Later used on the KTDU-426.
- 11D428A-10: Thruster used on the Zvezda ISS Module. Originally developed for the Mir Core Module.
- 11D428A-14: Thruster used on the Zvezda ISS module.
- 11D428A-16 (AKA RDMT-135M): Improved specific impulse version. Used on the KTDU-80 since Soyuz TM-28.
- 11D428AF-16:Thruster version developed for the Fobos-Grunt planetary sample mission.

Engine	11D428A	11D428A-16	11D428AF-16
Development	1968–1974	1968–1977	1993–1997
Engine Type	Liquid pressure-fed rocket engine		
Propellant	N_{2}O_{4}/UDMH with 1.85 O/F ratio		
Thrust	130.5 N (29.3 lbf)	129.16 N (29.04 lbf)	123.5 N (27.8 lbf)
isp	1:56 Exp. Nozzle:290 s (2.8 km/s); 1:150 Exp. Nozzle:302 s (2.96 km/s)	291 s (2.85 km/s)	306.2 s (3.003 km/s)
Nominal Inlet Pressure	1.77 MPa (257 psi)	1.76 MPa (255 psi)	1.47 MPa (213 psi)
Nozzle	1	1	1
Burn time	570s	2700s	50,000s
Ignitions	500,000		
Ignition time	0.03 to 2000s		
Mass	1.2 kg (2.6 lb)	1.5 kg (3.3 lb)	1.9 kg (4.2 lb)
Length	274 mm (10.8 in)	289.5 mm (11.40 in)	372 mm (14.6 in)
Diameter	98 mm (3.9 in)		157.4 mm (6.20 in)
Uses	Soyuz 7K-S, Soyuz-T and Soyuz-TM	Soyuz-TMA, Salyut-6, Salyut-7, Mir Core Module, Zvezda	Fobos-Grunt
References			

== See also ==
- KB KhIMMASH
- KTDU-35
- KTDU-80
- Soyuz-T
- Soyuz-TM
