= S5.80 =

Liquid pressure-fed rocket engine

- Country of origin: USSR
- Date: 1977-1986
- First flight: 1986-05-21 (Soyuz TM-1)
- Designer: OKB-2, Anton Tavzarachvili
- Application: Spacecraft main propulsion
- Predecessor: 11D426
- Status: In Production

Liquid-fuel engine
- Propellant: N_{2}O_{4} / UDMH
- Mixture ratio: 1.85
- Cycle: pressure fed

Configuration
- Chamber: 1
- Nozzle ratio: 153.8

Performance
- Thrust, vacuum: 2.95 kN (660 lbf)
- Chamber pressure: 0.88 MPa (128 psi)
- Specific impulse, vacuum: 302 s (2.96 km/s)
- Burn time: 890 seconds
- Restarts: 30
- Gimbal range: ±5°

Dimensions
- Length: 1.2 m (47 in)
- Diameter: 2.1 m (83 in)
- Dry mass: 310 kg (680 lb)

Used in
- Soyuz since Soyuz-TM and Progress since Progress-M

The S5.80 is a liquid pressure-fed rocket engine burning N_{2}O_{4}/UDMH with an O/F of 1.85. It is used for crew-rated spacecraft propulsion applications. It is currently used in the Soyuz-TMA-M spacecraft propulsion module KTDU-80, and its sibling, the S5.79 rocket engine, is still used as the main propulsion of the Zvezda ISS module. The S5.80 generates 2.95 kN (660 lbf) of thrust with a chamber pressure of 0.88 MPa (128 psi) and a nozzle expansion of 153.8 that enables it to achieve a specific impulse of 302 s (2.96 km/s). It is rated for 30 starts with a total firing time of 890 seconds. The engine, without the pressurization system or propellant tanks, weighs 310 kg (680 lb) and is an integrated unit that is 1.2 m (47 in) long with a diameter of 2.1 m (83 in).

== Versions ==
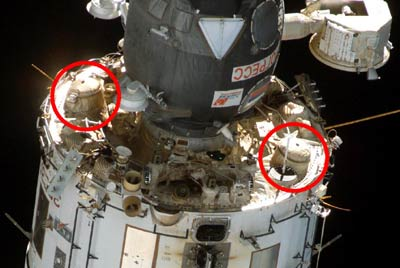
The ISS Zvezda module thruster units circled.

This engine has been used with certain variations in the crewed Russian space program since the Salyut 6 in Soviet times. The three main versions are:

- 11D426: Used as the main orbit correction engine of the Soyuz-T it was part of the integrated propulsion module KTDU-426 which was the big innovation introduced with that series. It enabled using fewer engines, increasing the reliability and reducing the weight of the spacecraft using a dual string redundant pressurization and propellant feed system for the main propulsion and the reaction control system. Since the latter could be used to de-orbit the spacecraft, it eliminated the need for backup orbital correction engine like the KTDU-35 required.
- S5.79 (AKA KRD-79): The orbit correction propulsion module of the second generation DOS stations, the Salyut-6 and Salyut-7 space stations, the Mir Core Module and the Zvezda ISS module. It was designed by KB KhIMMASH under RKK Energia specification based on the 11D426 design. It has improved life and restart capabilities, and is offered in a single compact unit. Each station has two of such engines.
- S5.80: An evolution of the 11D426 and S5.79 it is used on the KTDU-80 propulsion module that has been a staple of all Soyuz since the Soyuz-TM and Progress since the Progress-M. It has slightly reduced thrust but improved specific impulse, while improving engine life over the 11D426.

Engine (SKD)	11D426	S5.79	S5.80
Propulsion module	KTDU-426	KRD-79	KTDU-80
Development	1968–1974	1968-1977	1977–1986
Engine Type	Liquid pressure-fed rocket engine		
Module	integrated spacecraft propulsion, pressurization and attitude control system	main propulsion engine	integrated spacecraft propulsion, pressurization and attitude control system
Propellant	N_{2}O_{4}/UDMH with 1.85 O/F ratio		
Thrust (SKD)	3.09 kN (690 lbf)	3.09 kN (690 lbf)	2.95 kN (660 lbf)
isp	292 s (2.86 km/s)	293.7 s (2.880 km/s)	302 s (2.96 km/s)
Chamber Pressure	0.88 MPa (128 psi)	1.75 MPa (254 psi)	0.88 MPa (128 psi)
Nozzle	1	1	1
Expansion Ratio			153.8
Burn time	570s	2700s	890s
Ignitions	40	70	30
Mass	270 kg (600 lb)	38.5 kg (85 lb)	310 kg (680 lb)
Length	1,200 mm (47 in)	840 mm (33 in)	1,204 mm (47.4 in)
Diameter	2,100 mm (83 in)	550 mm (22 in)	2,100 mm (83 in)
Uses	Soyuz-T	Salyut-6, Salyut-7, Mir Core Module, Zvezda	Soyuz-TM Soyuz-TM Soyuz-TMA Soyuz-TMA-M Progress-M Pirs Poisk
References			

== See also ==
- KB KhIMMASH
- KTDU-35
- KTDU-80
- Soyuz-T
- Soyuz-TM
