= KDU-414 =

Type of rocket engine

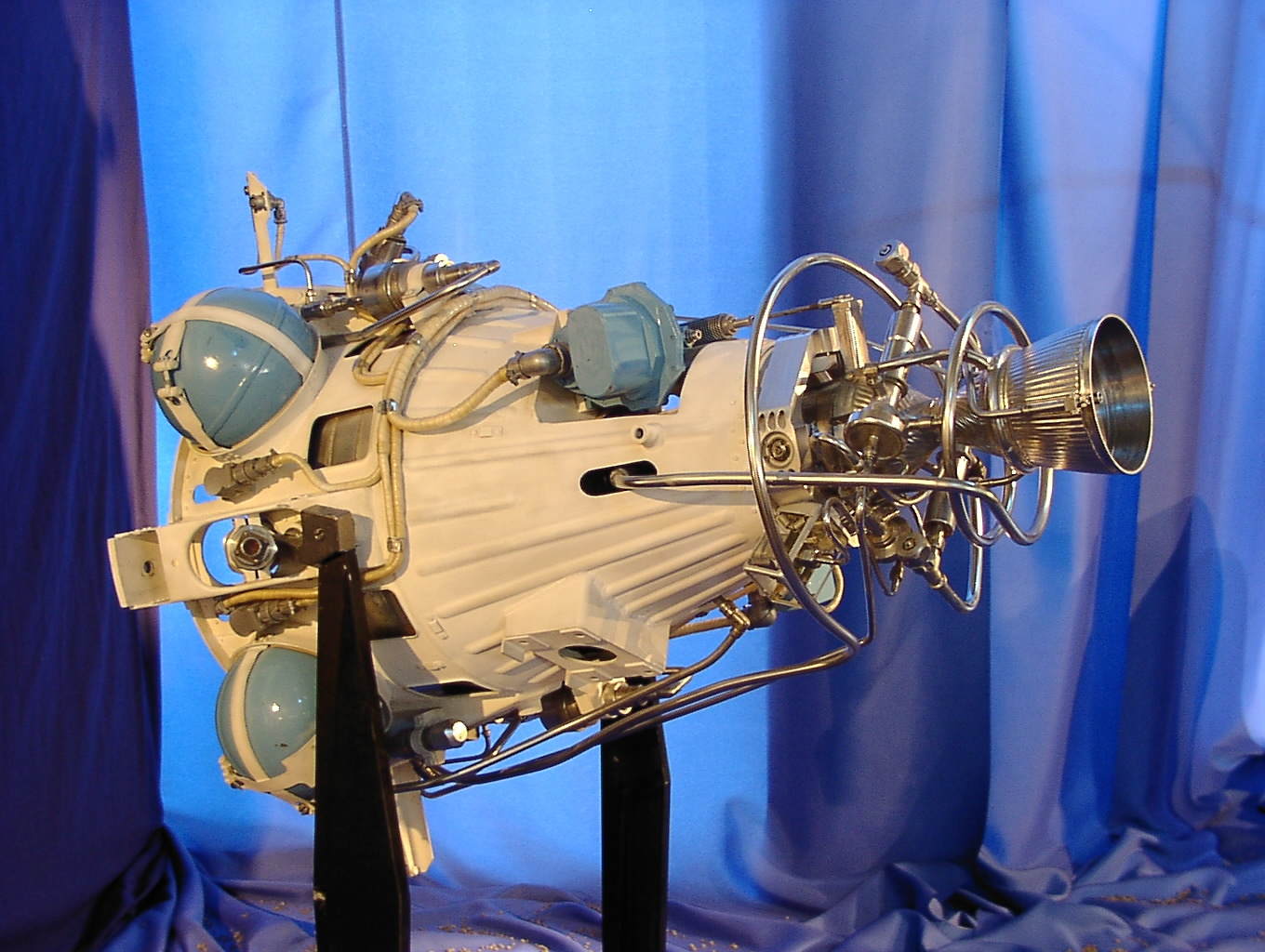
- KDU-414 as seen on the "Russia in Space" exhibition (Airport Frankfurt, Germany, 2002)
- Country of origin: Soviet Union
- First flight: 1960
- Last flight: 1974
- Designer: Aleksei Isaev
- Manufacturer: Isayev Design Bureau
- Application: Attitude Control & Mid-course corrections
- Successor: KDU-414A

Liquid-fuel engine
- Propellant: IRFNA / UDMH
- Mixture ratio: 2.6
- Cycle: Pressure-fed

Configuration
- Chamber: Single chamber

Performance
- Thrust, vacuum: 445.5 lbf / 202 kgf 1.96 kN
- Thrust-to-weight ratio: 3.27
- Chamber pressure: 1.18 MPa / 11.80 bar
- Specific impulse, vacuum: 272 s
- Burn time: 40 s
- Restarts: 2
- Propellant capacity: 77 lb / 35 kg

Dimensions
- Length: 3.34 ft / 1.02 m
- Diameter: 2.42 ft / 0.74 m
- Dry mass: 134 lb / 61 kg

Used in
- Molniya satellites (First series); Kosmos satellites Mars 1 Venera 1 Zond 2 Zond 3

The KDU-414 (Russian Корректирующая Двигательная Установка, Corrective Propulsion Unit), is a pressure-fed liquid rocket Propulsion Unit developed and produced by the Isayev Design Bureau (today known as KhimMash). From 1960 onward, it powered several unmanned Soviet Spacecraft, including the first series of Molniya satellites, several Kosmos satellites as well as the space probes Mars 1, Venera 1, Zond 2 and Zond 3, featured as a part of standardized spacecraft buses known as KAUR-2, 2MV and 3MV.

The Corrective Propulsion Unit consists of a single chamber 'S5.19' liquid rocket engine and a conical thermal protection cowl containing the spherical propellant tank. A barrier splits the tank into two separate compartments, filled with the propellant, UDMH, and the oxidizer, IRFNA, respectively. This combination of propellants is hypergolic, igniting on contact. The rocket motor is supplied with fuel by pressurizing the tank using gaseous nitrogen, which doubles as a source of RCS propellant. Elastic barriers within the tank prevent the nitrogen gas and propellant/oxidiser from mixing with each other.

A gimbal mount allows the engine to swivel along two axes.

In 1974, it was replaced with its derived successor, the KDU-414A with the S5.114 engine.
