= S5.142 =

- Country of origin: Russia
- Date: 1990-1996
- First flight: 1996-02-21 (Soyuz TM-23)
- Designer: KB KhIMMASH
- Application: attitude control thruster
- Predecessor: 11D427M
- Status: Retired

Liquid-fuel engine
- Propellant: N_{2}O_{4} / UDMH
- Mixture ratio: 1.85
- Cycle: pressure fed

Configuration
- Chamber: 1
- Nozzle ratio: 45

Performance
- Thrust, vacuum: 25 N (5.6 lbf)
- Chamber pressure: 0.88 MPa (128 psi)
- Specific impulse, vacuum: 285 s (2.79 km/s)
- Burn time: 25,000 seconds
- Restarts: 300,000

Dimensions
- Length: 180 mm (7.1 in)
- Diameter: 136 mm (5.4 in)
- Dry mass: 0.9 kg (2.0 lb)

Used in
- KTDU-80 (excluding Soyuz MS)

The S5.142 (AKA DST-25) is a liquid pressure-fed rocket engine burning N_{2}O_{4}/UDMH with an O/F of 1.85. It is used for crew-rated spacecraft propulsion applications. It was used in KTDU-80 propulsion module from the Soyuz-TM to the Soyuz-TMA-M, as the low thrust thruster (DPO-M). As of the Soyuz MS, KTDU-80 does not use DPO-M anymore.

The S5.142 generates 25 N (5.6 lbf) of thrust with a chamber pressure of 0.88 MPa (128 psi) and a nozzle expansion of 45 that enables it to achieve a specific impulse of 285 s (2.79 km/s). It is rated for 300,000 starts with a total firing time of 25,000 seconds and can do single burns from 0.03 seconds to 4,000 seconds. Each unit weights 0.9 kg (2.0 lb).

== Versions ==
This engine has been used in crewed Russian space program since the Soyuz TM-23. There are two versions:

- S5.142 (AKA DST-25): Version used as DPO-M (attitude control thrusters) on the KTDU-80 unit of the Soyuz-TM up to the Soyuz-TMA-M.
- S5.142A: A version of the S5.142 adapted for the KVTK upper stage for the Angara rocket.

== See also ==
- KB KhIMMASH
- KTDU-80
- Soyuz-TMA
