= S5.98M =

Russian rocket engine

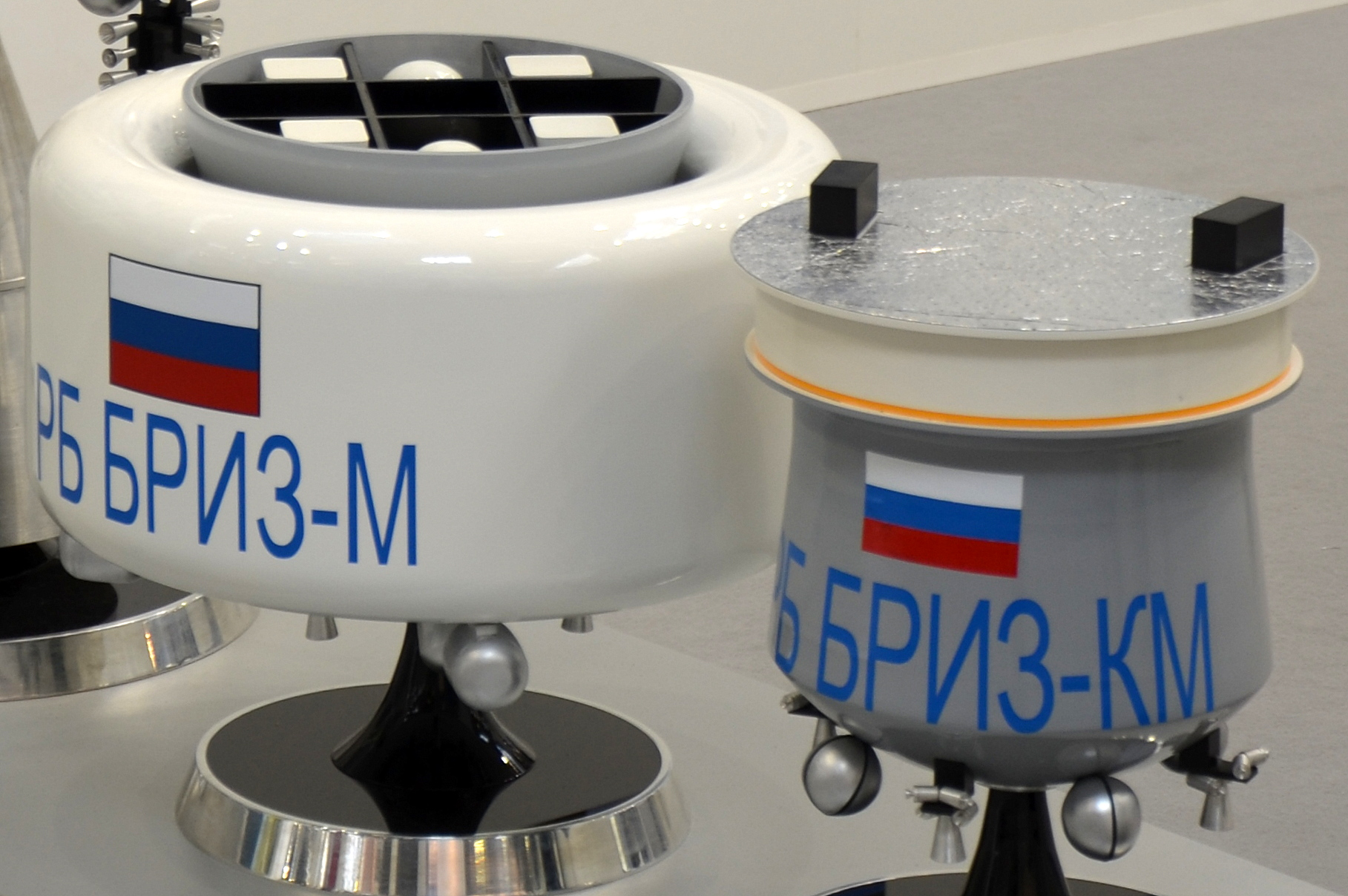
- Models of Russian Briz-M and Briz-KM rocket upper stages, which use the S5.98M engine
- Country of origin: Russia
- First flight: 1990-11-20
- Manufacturer: KB KhIMMASH
- Application: Upper stage
- Associated LV: Proton-M and Rokot
- Predecessor: S5.92
- Status: In production

Liquid-fuel engine
- Propellant: N_{2}O_{4} / UDMH
- Mixture ratio: 2.0
- Cycle: Gas generator

Configuration
- Chamber: 1

Performance
- Thrust, vacuum: 19.62 kilonewtons (4,410 lbf)
- Chamber pressure: 9.8 megapascals (1,420 psi)
- Specific impulse, vacuum: 328.6 seconds
- Burn time: 3,200 seconds
- Restarts: 7

Dimensions
- Length: 1,150 millimetres (45 in)
- Diameter: 948 millimetres (37.3 in)
- Dry mass: 95 kilograms (209 lb)

Used in
- Briz-M and Rokot

The S5.98M, also known as the 14D30, is a Russian rocket engine, currently powering the Briz upper stages. It was designed by KB KhIMMASH, the famous Isaev designed bureau. It burns a hypergolic mixture of unsymmetrical dimethylhydrazine (UDMH) fuel with dinitrogen tetroxide (N_{2}O_{4}) oxidizer in a gas-generator cycle.

== See also ==
- Briz-M - The upper stage that is powered by the S5.98M.
- Proton-M - The heavy lift rocket that uses the Briz-M stage.
- Rokot - The light lift rocket that uses the smaller Briz-KM stage.
- Khrunichev - The manufacturer of the Briz stage and the corporate parent of the designer bureau.
