= A.M. Isayev Chemical Engineering Design Bureau =

Russian rocket engine design and manufacturing company

- Native name: Конструкторское бюро химического машиностроения имени A.M. Исаева
- Romanized name: Chemical Engineering Design Bureau named after A.M. Isayev
- Formerly: OKB-2
- Type: subsidiary
- Industry: Liquid rocket engine manufacturing; equipment for heat treatment of meat and fish; medical equipment; common consumption goods
- Predecessor: NII-88
- Founded: 1948 Podlipki (Korolyov), Soviet Union
- Founder: Aleksei Mihailovich Isaev
- Headquarters: 12 Bogomolov street, Korolyov (Russian: ул. Богомолова, д. 12, Королёв), Moscow region, Russia
- Key people: Igor G. Panin
- Products: S5.92; KTDU-80 S5.142
- Parent: Khrunichev State Research and Production Space Center
- Website: Official Website

The A.M. Isayev Chemical Engineering Design Bureau (Russian: Конструкторское бюро химического машиностроения имени A.M. Исаева), also known as KB KhimMash or just KBKhM, is a Russian rocket engine design and manufacturing company. It is located in the city of Korolyov. It started as the OKB-2 division of the NII-88 research institute, where A.Isaev directed the development of liquid rocket engines for ballistic missile submarines.

== Products ==
=== Current engines ===
Engines in current production:

- Monopropellant Thrusters
  - DOT-5
  - DOT-25
  - MLC-10
  - MLC-50
- Bipropellant Thrusters
  - S5.142 (DST-25)
  - DST-50
  - DST-100
  - DST-100A
  - DST-200
  - DST-200A
  - DMT-6
  - DMT-500
  - DMT-600
  - DMT-1000
  - DMT-2200
- Main propulsion
  - S5.80
  - S5.92
  - S5.98
  - KVD-1
- Propulsion Modules
  - KTDU-80
- Experimental Engines
  - S5.86.1000-0

=== Former engines ===
Engines that are no longer produced.

- Monopropellant Thrusters
  - S5.70: Used on Phobos 1 spacecraft.
  - S5.70: Used on Phobos 1 spacecraft.
- Bipropellant Thrusters
  - S5.144: Used on the control module 17D61 of the Ikar.
  - S5.205
- Orbit Correction Engines
  - S5.4: Liquid engine burning TG-02 and AK20F in the gas generator cycle. Used to deorbit Vostok, Voskhod and Zenit.
  - S5.35: Backup engine of the KTDU-35.
  - S5.53: Orbital correction engine for the lunar version of the Soyuz.
  - S5.60: Main engine of the KTDU-35.
  - S5.66: Maneuvering engine version for the Salyut 1 and Salyut 4 stations. Also was composed of primary and secondary engines.
  - S5.79: Pressure-fed rocket engine burning N_{2}O_{4}/UDMH. Used as the main orbital engine of Salyut-6, Salyut-7, Mir Core Module and Zvezda.
- Propulsion Modules
  - KDU-414: Pressure-fed liquid rocket engine burning UDMH and RFNA. Used on early soviet deep space probes.
  - KTDU-35: Liquid rocket engine burning UDMH and AK27I in the gas generator cycle. Used on first generation Soyuz, and Progress.
  - KTDU-425: Pump-fed liquid rocket engine. Used on the 4MV bus employed by unmanned Mars and Venus probes.
  - KTDU-426: Spacecraft version of the S5.79. Used on the Soyuz-T.
- Military Missiles
  - RD-1
  - RD-1M
  - Y-1250
  - U-400-10
  - PT 45-2
  - SU-1500
  - Y-2000
  - S09.19A?
  - S09.29A S09.29.0-0
  - S09.29D
  - S09.29B
  - S09.29.0-OV?
  - S09.29.0-OV?
  - S2.145
  - S2.145
  - S2.168A
  - S2.168B
  - S2.219
  - S.911.0100 S2.219?
  - S2.244
  - S2.258
  - S2.260
  - S2.268
  - S2.514
  - S2.711
  - S2.711V S2.711V1
  - S2.720
  - S2.720.A2
  - S2.720M
  - S2.721 S2.721V
  - S2.722
  - S2.722V
  - S2.726
  - S2.727
  - S2.751V?
  - S2.1100: A TG-02/AK20K burning engine. Development years: 1955–1958. For use in the booster module of the Burya intercontinental cruise missile project.
  - S2.1150: An improved version of the S2.1100. Development years: 1958–1960. For use in the booster module of the Burya project.
  - S2.1200
  - S5.1
  - S.5.6.0000.0
  - S5.15
  - S5.33
  - S5.33A S5.33M
  - S5.41
  - S5.44 5D25
  - S5.57
  - S5.44 5D25
  - 5D25N
  - S5.83
- Rocket engines for ICBM and SLBM
  - S2.253 (8D511): A kerosene/AK20 burning engine in the pressure fed cycle. Development years: 1951-1955 . For use in first versions of Scud-A. Ignition by hypergolic start fuel TG-02.
  - S2.253A: A kerosene/AK-20 burning engine in the pressure fed cycle. Development years: 1953-1959 . For use in the RSM-11FM. Ignition by hypergolic start fuel TG-02.
  - S2.713: A TG-02/AK27I burning engine in the gas generator cycle. Development years: 1956-1961 . For use in the R-13. It included a fixed nozzle and four verniers.
  - S5.2 (9D21): A TM-185/AK-27I burning engine in the gas generator cycle. Development years: 1959-1962 . For use in the R-17.
  - S5.3: A TG-02/AK-27I burning engine in the gas generator cycle. Development years: 1958-1963 . For use in the R-21.
  - S5.3M: A TG-02/AK-27I burning engine in the gas generator cycle. Development years: 1960. Project for the ICBM R-9B.
  - 4D10: A UDMH/N_{2}O_{4} burning engine in the staged combustion cycle. Development years: 1962-1968 . For use as main engine of the first stage of R-27. First engine submerged in the propellant tank.
  - 4D10: A UDMH/N_{2}O_{4} burning engine in the gas generator cycle. Development years: 1963-1968 . For use as the steering engine of the first stage of the R-27. Submerged in the propellant tank.
  - 4D76: A UDMH/N_{2}O_{4} burning engine in the gas generator cycle. Development years: 1964-1971 . For use as main engine of the second stage of R-29. Submerged in the propellant tank.
  - 4D76M: A UDMH/N_{2}O_{4} burning engine in the gas generator cycle. Development years: 1969-1970 . Improved version of the 4D-76.
  - 4D28: A UDMH/N_{2}O_{4} burning engine in the gas generator cycle. Development years: 1968-1970 . For use on the second stage of the rocket RSM-27K.
  - 3D20: A UDMH/N_{2}O_{4} burning engine in the staged combustion cycle. Development years: 1971-1973 . For use as main engine RSM-27U.
  - 3D20: A UDMH/N_{2}O_{4} burning engine in the gas generator cycle. Development years: 1971-1973 . For use as steering engine R-27U.
  - 3D41: A UDMH/N_{2}O_{4} burning engine in the gas generator cycle. Development years: 1973-1975 . For use on the second stage of R-29R. Submerged in the propellant tank.
  - 3D42: A UDMH/N_{2}O_{4} burning engine in the gas generator cycle. Development years: 1973-1975 . For use on warhead of the R-29R . Four fixed main combustion chambers and four verniers.
  - 3D67?: A UDMH/N_{2}O_{4} burning engine in the gas generator cycle. Development years: 1976-1980 . For use on warhead of the R-39. Dual-mode rocket engine with multiple regimen.
  - 3D36: A UDMH/N_{2}O_{4} burning engine in the gas generator cycle. Development years: 1980-1986 . For use on warhead of the R-29RM.
  - 3D38: A UDMH/N_{2}O_{4} burning engine in the staged combustion cycle. Development years: 1980-1986 . For use on the second stage R-29RM. Submerged in the propellant tank.
  - 3D39: A UDMH/N_{2}O_{4} burning engine in the staged combustion cycle. Development years: 1980-1986 . For use on the third stage R-29RM. Submerged in the propellant tank.

== See also ==
- NII-88 — The research institute where KB KhimMash started as OKB-2 division.
- Khrunichev State Research and Production Space Center — The corporate parent of KBKhM.
- United Rocket and Space Corporation — The government owned corporate entity that will encompass all aerospace corporations in Russia.
