= S5.92 =

Russian upper stage rocket engine

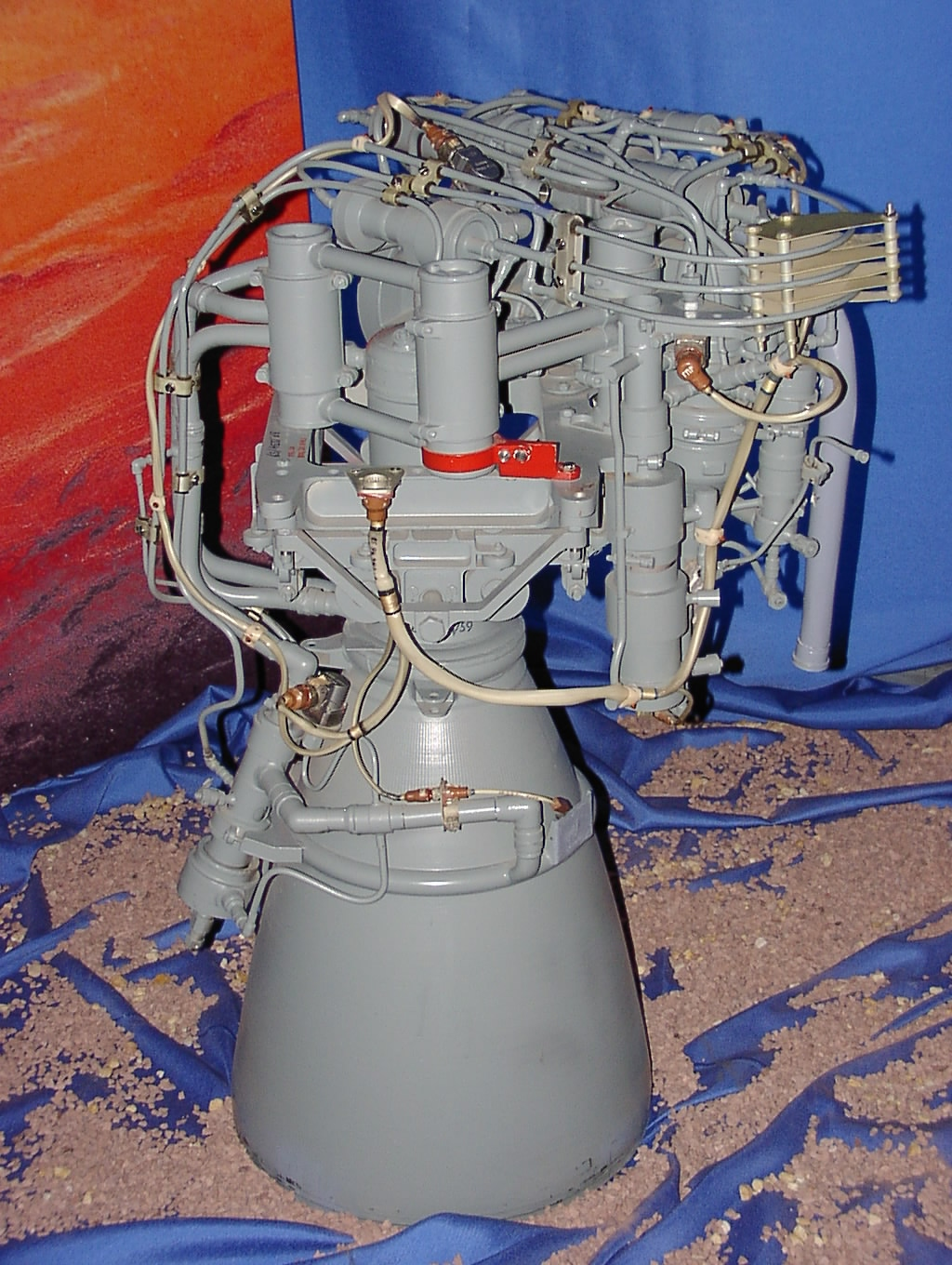
- Country of origin: Soviet Union; Russia
- First flight: 1988-07-07
- Designer: KB KhIMMASH
- Application: Upper Stage
- Associated LV: Soyuz, Zenit
- Status: In production

Liquid-fuel engine
- Propellant: N_{2}O_{4} / UDMH
- Mixture ratio: 2.0
- Cycle: Gas generator

Configuration
- Chamber: 1

Performance
- Thrust, vacuum: 19.61 kilonewtons (4,410 lbf)
- Chamber pressure: 9.61 megapascals (1,394 psi)
- Specific impulse, vacuum: 327 seconds
- Burn time: 2,000 seconds

Dimensions
- Length: 1,028 millimetres (40.5 in)
- Diameter: 838 millimetres (33.0 in)(max)
- Dry mass: 75 kilograms (165 lb)

Used in
- Fregat and Phobos program

The S5.92 is a Russian rocket engine, currently used on the Fregat upper stage. It burns a hypergolic mixture of unsymmetrical dimethylhydrazine (UDMH) fuel with dinitrogen tetroxide (N_{2}O_{4}) oxidizer in a gas-generator cycle.

== Design ==
The S5.92 has two throttle settings. The highest produces 19.61 kilonewtons (4,410 lbf) of thrust, a specific impulse of 327 seconds, and a 3-second ignition transient. The lower throttle level produces 13.73 kilonewtons (3,090 lbf) of thrust, specific impulse of 316 seconds, and a 2.5 second ignition transient. It is rated for 50 ignitions, and 300 days between ignitions.

== History ==
It was originally designed by the famous A.M. Isayev Chemical Engineering Design Bureau, for the two spacecraft of the Phobos program. While the Mars missions were unsuccessful, the spacecraft manufacturer, NPO Lavochkin, found a market niche for the technology. Thus, the engine was adapted for use on the optional Fregat upper stage of the Soyuz and Zenit launch vehicles.

== See also ==
- Fregat - The upper stage that is powered by the S5.92.
- Soyuz - A medium lift rocket that uses the Fregat stage.
- Zenit-3F - A heavy lift rocket that uses the Fregat stage.
- S5.98M - Related gas generator-cycle rocket engine that powers the Briz upper-stage on the Proton-M and Angara A5 launch vehicles.
