= Tonka (fuel) =

Rocket fuel

Tonka is the name given to a family of German-designed rocket propellants first used under the name R-Stoff. Tonka propellants were later used in the Soviet Union, most commonly the TG-02 formulation, for example in the engine designs of the A.M. Isayev Chemical Engineering Design Bureau. Their use was later passed on along with other Soviet rocket technology to Iraq, Iran, Afghanistan and later North Korea.

Its name is a reference to the tonka bean. Being invented during the Second World War, it has no connection to the similarly named toys.

The original R-Stoff formulation used by Nazi Germany was composed of 43% triethylamine and 57% xylidine.

Its most common formulation, known as TONKA-250, TG-02 and under the code name Samin was made of 50% triethylamine and 50% xylidine, most commonly used with nitric acid or its anhydrous nitric oxide derivatives (classified as the AK-2x family in the Soviet Union) as the oxidiser; the combination is hypergolic and has a maximum practical specific impulse of approximately 2.12–2.43 km/s (216–248 s) at sea level, with the latter figure stated as a specification for the R-21 Submarine Launched Ballistic Missile, first fielded in 1963.

A third, less common formulation known as TONKA-500 contained 35% octane, 20% benzene, including xylene, 12% xylidine, 10% aniline, 10% methyl vinyl ether, 8% ethylamine, 5% methylamine.

The Soviet Union reverse-engineered the Wasserfall missile and investigated the use of hypergolic propellants for the eventually abandoned Burya intercontinental cruise missile project. It put TG-02/AK-2x fuelled engines into service with the Kh-22 cruise missile and the S5.4 de-orbit engine used on the Vostok and Voskhod spacecraft and the Zenit satellite.

The most globalized use of Tonka is as an igniter in many Soviet Scud missile variants and its descendants, such as the North Korean Nodong, which are principally propelled by nitric acid and kerosene (TM-185). This combination is not hypergolic so needs an ignition source, supplied by a system that injects a few kilograms of Tonka fuel when ignition is desired. The progenitor Scud engine, the S2.253, with a specific impulse of 2.15 km/s (219 s) at sea level, popularized this ignition arrangement.

Triethylamine/xylidine mixtures composed the TX and TX2 fuels of the French SEPR rocket engines of the 1950s, used for auxiliary rocket power in the Mirage IIIC. In aircraft use, TX fuels were later replaced by non-toxic kerosene jet fuels, simplifying fuelling of the aircraft. Little change was required to the engines but as this was no longer hypergolic with nitric acid, a small tank of TX was retained for ignition.

The use of Tonka by amateurs is not advised, because the exact proportions of ingredients necessary for the mixture to work as desired, rather than fail catastrophically, is a function both of the purity of the ingredients and their temperature during use.

== See also ==
- Furfuryl alcohol - also hypergolic with nitric acid but lower performance
- List of stoffs - a list of chemical codenames used in Third reich rocket projects and chemical warfare
- Unsymmetrical dimethylhydrazine - a higher performance substance that replaced Tonka/TG-02 as a fuel for Soviet spacecraft.
