= S5.4 =

Russian liquid rocket engine

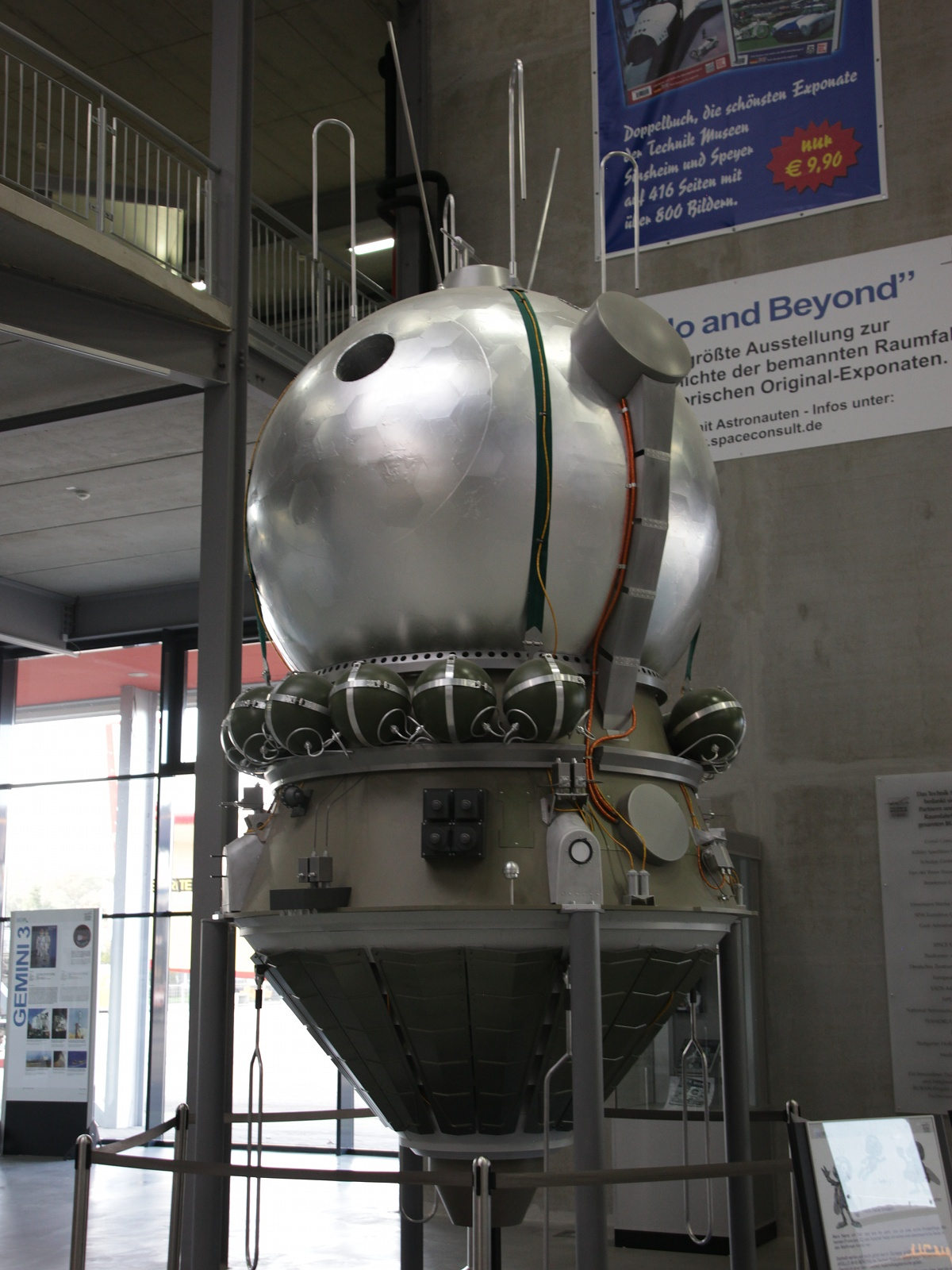
- Vostok spacecraft replica at the Technik Museum Speyer, Germany. The lower conical section was the service module with the S5.4/TDU-1 engine.
- Country of origin: USSR
- Date: 1959-1961
- First flight: 1959
- Designer: OKB-2, A.M. Isaev
- Application: Spacecraft braking engine
- Successor: S5.35
- Status: Retired

Liquid-fuel engine
- Propellant: AK20F / TG-02
- Mixture ratio: 3.07
- Cycle: Gas generator

Configuration
- Chamber: 1 main + 4 vernier

Performance
- Thrust, vacuum: 15.83 kilonewtons (3,560 lbf)
- Chamber pressure: 5.6 megapascals (810 psi)
- Specific impulse, vacuum: 266 seconds
- Burn time: 45 seconds
- Propellant capacity: 250 kilograms (550 lb)

Dimensions
- Length: 1.13 metres (44 in)
- Diameter: 0.95 metres (37 in)
- Dry mass: 98 kilograms (216 lb)

Used in
- Vostok, Voskhod and Zenit

The S5.4 (AKA TDU-1, GRAU Index 8D66), was a Russian liquid rocket engine burning TG-02 and AK20F in the gas generator cycle. It was originally used as the braking (deorbit) engine of the Vostok and Voskhod crewed spacecraft, and Zenit satellites, which later switched to solid motors.

The engine produced 15.83 kilonewtons (3,560 lbf) of thrust with a specific impulse of 266 seconds in vacuum, and burned for 45 seconds, enough for the deorbit. It had a main fixed combustion chamber and four small verniers to supply vector control. It was housed in the service module and had two toroidal tanks for pressurization.

It was designed by OKB-2, the Design Bureau led by Aleksei Isaev, for the Vostok program. The braking engine for the first crewed spacecraft was a difficult task that no design bureau wanted to take. It was considered critical, as a failure would have left a cosmonaut stranded in space. A solid motor was considered, but the ballistic experts predicted a 500-kilometer (270-nautical-mile) landing error, versus a tenth of that for a liquid engine. It took the coordinated efforts of Boris Chertok and Sergei Korolev to convince Isaev to accept the task.
