= Arsenic oxide =

Arsenic oxide may refer to any of the following:

- Arsenic trioxide, As_{4}O_{6}
- Arsenic dioxide, As_{2}O_{4}
- Arsenic pentoxide, As_{2}O_{5}
