= Mélange (rocket fuel component) =

Mélange (Soviet name for Inhibited Red Fuming Nitric Acid) is a liquid oxidant rocket propellant component that was "used during the Soviet era as one of two components to propel small and medium range missiles." It is a highly toxic and aggressive mixture of nitric acid (≥ 70%) and dinitrogen tetroxide (18-27%) and other additives and impurities (~ 3%) with very limited amount of water (≤ 4%). As the mixture is an extremely strong oxidant, it can ignite combustibles upon contact. Upon decomposition it produces red fumes of nitrogen tetroxide and nitric acid.

Some former-Soviet countries have large quantities. Ukraine, for example, had 16,000 tonnes, which the OSCE has helped process. NATO has successfully processed mélange in Uzbekistan. Most states are eliminating their mélange, either by neutralizing it or transferring it to specialized chemical facilities. The substance can be processed into chemical products for civilian use, such as agricultural fertilizers.
