= KTDU-35 =

- Country of origin: USSR
- Date: 1962–1967
- First flight: 1966-11-28 (Kosmos 133)
- Designer: OKB-2, Anton Tavzarachvili
- Application: Spacecraft main propulsion
- Predecessor: S5.4
- Successor: KTDU-426
- Status: Retired

Liquid-fuel engine
- Propellant: AK27I / UDMH
- Mixture ratio: 1.85
- Cycle: gas generator

Configuration
- Chamber: S5.60: 1 S5.35: 2

Performance
- Thrust, vacuum: S5.60:4.09 kN (920 lbf); S5.35:4.03 kN (910 lbf)
- Chamber pressure: S5.60:3.92 MPa (569 psi)
- Specific impulse, vacuum: S5.60:278 seconds S5.35:270 seconds
- Burn time: 500 seconds
- Restarts: 25

Dimensions
- Length: 1.1 m (43 in)
- Diameter: 1.5 m (59 in)
- Dry mass: 305 kg (672 lb)

Used in
- Soyuz from 7K-OK to 7K-T and Progress 7K-TG

The KTDU-35 (GRAU Index 11D62) was a Soviet spacecraft propulsion system composed of two liquid rocket engines, the primary, S5.60 (SKD) and the secondary S5.35 (DKD), fed from the same propellant tanks. Both engines burn UDMH and AK27I in the gas generator cycle. It was designed by OKB-2, the famous Isaev Design Bureau, for the original Soyuz programme.

Within the Soyuz and Progress, the SKD is the primary engine, the DKD is the backup engine for main orbital correction and de-orbit operations. The engine generate 4.09 kN (920 lbf) (SKD) or 4.03 kN (910 lbf) (DKD) of thrust with a specific impulse of 278 seconds and 270 seconds, respectively. The SKD nozzle is fixed in the aft of the craft, and the dual DKD nozzles are on either side. The spacecraft attitude system (DPO) is responsible for pointing the vehicle in the correct direction and keep it that way during SKD burns.

== Versions ==
This engine has been used in three variants:

- S5.53: Orbital correction engine for the lunar version of the Soyuz.
- S5.60 (AKA KTDU-35 GRAU Index 11D62): Version for the LEO version of the Soyuz.
- S5.66 (AKA KTDU-66): Maneuvering engine version for the Salyut 1 and Salyut 4 stations. Increased burn time to 1000 seconds and increased number of starts. Also was composed of primary and secondary engines.

== See also ==
- Soyuz 7K-OK
- Soyuz 7K-OKS
- Soyuz 7K-T
- Soyuz 7K-TM
- Progress 7K-TG
- Isaev
- S5.4
