= Aquarius (rocket) =

Proposed hydrolox vehicle launched from the ocean

- Function: SSTO Expendable launch system
- Manufacturer: Space Systems/Loral, Aerojet, Microcosm
- Country of origin: United States

Size
- Height: 43.00 m (141.08 ft)
- Diameter: 4 m (13 ft)
- Mass: 130,000 kg (290,000 lb) (10,000 kg (22,000 lb) empty)
- Stages: 1

Capacity

Payload to LEO
- Mass: 1,000 kg (2,200 lb) to a 200 km orbit

Launch history
- Status: Cancelled
- Launch sites: Hawaii
- Total launches: 0

First stage
- Powered by: 1
- Maximum thrust: 400,000 lbf (1.8 MN)
- Propellant: LOX/LH2

Aquarius is a launch vehicle concept designed for low-cost by Space Systems/Loral to carry small, inexpensive payloads into low earth orbit.

== Concept ==
The vehicle was primarily intended for launching bulk products, like water, fuel, and other consumables, that are inexpensive to replace in the event of a launch failure. The target launch cost was $1 million. Aquarius was designed to be a single-stage vehicle 43 meters (141 ft) high and 4 meters (13.1 ft) in diameter and powered by a single pressure fed engine using liquid hydrogen and oxygen propellants stored in a composite pressure tank. Launch would have taken place from a floating position in the ocean to minimize launch infrastructure with the ability to place a 1,000-kilogram (2,200 lb) payload into a 200-kilometer (120 mi), 52-degree orbit. The payload, located in the base of the vehicle, would be extracted by an orbiting space tug for transfer to its ultimate destination, like the ISS or a propellant depot, after which the vehicle would de-orbit and be destroyed.

== Vortex Cooled Chamber Wall Engine ==
Space Systems/Loral teamed with Microcosm, and Wilson Composite Technologies to study Aquarius under a $110,000 grant awarded by the state of California in April 2001 and delivered a final report in June 2002.

Funding of $1 million was provided in the FY 2004 Defense Appropriations Act to develop a prototype of the low-cost engine for the vehicle. The engine would provide 400,000 pounds-force (1.8 MN) of thrust using liquid oxygen and liquid hydrogen as propellants. For the engine development, Space Systems/Loral is partnered with Aerojet, ORBITEC and Microcosm, under the auspices of the Air Force Research Laboratory and was completed in 2006. It confirmed that an ORBITEC engine design with inherently low cost can be scaled up to an intermediate thrust level, from which the next scale-up step to Aquarius should be achievable.

== COTS bid ==
The proposal made with Constellation Services International for Commercial Orbital Transportation Services in 2006 was not selected. $150 million was the planned development cost, as part of a $700 million project (that included a space tug). 100 launches per year were needed to be profitable. One third of the launches were by design allowed to fail. Target costs were $1 million per launch or $1000/kg to LEO.

== Design specification ==
- Diameter: 4 meters (12.6 feet)
- LH2 tank length: 21 meters (69 feet)
- LOX tank length: 8.4 meters (28 feet)
- GH2 Pressurant tank length: 4 meters
- Total height : 43 metres (140 feet)

== See also ==
- Pressure-fed engine
- Sea Dragon (rocket)
- Sea Launch
