= Research and Development Institute of Mechanical Engineering =

Subsidiary of Roscosmos

NIIMash
- Native name: ФГУП «Научно-исследовательский институт машиностроения»
- Romanized name: FSUE “Research and Development Institute of Mechanical Engineering”
- Formerly: OKB-2
- Company type: Federal State Unitary Enterprise
- Industry: Liquid rocket engine manufacturing; Development, production and operation of the bench test equipment; production of air separation products and liquefied natural gas
- Predecessor: NII-1 of Moscow
- Founded: September 1, 1958 in Soviet Union
- Founder: Mikhail G. Mironov
- Headquarters: Builders Street 72 (Russian: ул. Строителей, 72), Nizhnyaya Salda, Sverdlovsk Oblast, Russia
- Key people: Anatoly Long, Director of the Institute; Adolf I. Razzhigaev Chief Engineer
- Products: 11D428A-16; 17D58E 17D16
- Parent: Roscosmos
- Website: Official Website

FSUE Research and Development Institute of Mechanical Engineering (Russian: ФГУП Научно-исследовательский институт машиностроения), also known as NIIMash, is a Russian rocket engine design and manufacturing company specialized in small thrusters. It is located in the city of Nizhnyaya Salda, Sverdlovsk Oblast. It started as the B-175 factory of the NII-1 research institute, where Mikhail G. Mironov directed the development of liquid rocket engines research and testing.

== Products ==
NIIMash has an extensive experience in design of testing stands, measurement and control as well as certifications. They also have a line of custom built air separation plants. They also have extensive experience in rotational forming of metals. The list of space rated products is extensive and is the following:

=== Current propulsion products ===
Engines in current production:

- Propulsion
  - Experimental Reactive Control System Module
  - KDU 11D414NS
  - Fobos-Grunt Sample Return Spacecraft Propulsion System
  - Fobos-Grunt Spacecraft Thruster Modules
- Thrusters
  - MD5 (a.k.a. RDMT-5): Cold gas thruster.
  - MD08 (a.k.a. RDMT-8): Cold gas thrusters used on the Ekspress satellite series.
  - MD08-02 (a.k.a. RDMT-8-02): Cold gas thruster: Used on the Fobos-Grunt Sample Return Spacecraft.
  - 11D428A-16 (a.k.a. RDMT-135M): 135 N (30 lbf) N_{2}O_{4}/UDMH thruster. Used on the KTDU-80.
  - 11D428AF-16: N_{2}O_{4}/UDMH thrusters used by the Fobos-Grunt space mission.
  - 11D457: 53.9 N (12.1 lbf) N_{2}O_{4}/UDMH thrusters used by the Resurs-DK No.1.
  - 11D457F: 54 N (12 lbf) N_{2}O_{4}/UDMH thrusters used by the Fobos-Grunt space mission.
  - 11D458 (a.k.a. RDMT-400): 392 N (88 lbf) N_{2}O_{4}/UDMH thrusters used by the Functional Cargo Block based modules and the Briz upper stage.
  - 11D458F (a.k.a. RDMT-400F): 382 N (86 lbf) N_{2}O_{4}/UDMH thrusters used by the Fobos-Grunt space mission.
  - 11D458M (a.k.a. RDMT-400M): 392.4 N (88.2 lbf) N_{2}O_{4}/UDMH thrusters used by the Briz-M upper stage.
  - 17D16 (a.k.a. RDMT-200K): 200 N (45 lbf) GOX/Kerosene thruster. Used the Buran DO thrusters.
  - 17D58E: N_{2}O_{4}/UDMH thrusters used by the Briz-M upper stage.
  - 17D58EF: N_{2}O_{4}/UDMH thrusters used by the Fobos-Grunt space mission.
- Experimental thursters
  - RDMT2600: 2.6 kN (580 lbf) Ethanol/GOX thruster designed attitude control when the air density is so low that the control surfaces are ineffective.
  - RDMT10: 12 N (2.7 lbf) thruster designed for space applications.
- Propellant tanks & high pressure gas vessels
  - Composite high pressure Xenon storage tank: Xenon storage unit for electric propulsion spacecraft.
  - Composite Vessel: General high pressure vessel used on the Fobos-Grunt mission.
  - Monopropellant Tank with Stiff-Plastic Separation Device (Diaphragm): Monopropellant storage unit used on the Fobos-Grunt mission.
  - Bipropellant Tank with Stiff-Plastic Separation Devices (Diaphragms): Bipropellant storage unit used on communications satellites.
- Solenoid Valves
  - RT.200:
  - 18RT.200:
  - 16RT.200:
  - 12RT.200:
  - 6RT.200:
- Flow stabilizers
  - CP1: 2.43 g (0.086 oz) per second of hypergolic propellant flow.
  - CP2: 23.5 g (0.83 oz) per second of hypergolic propellant flow.
  - CP3: 63 g (2.2 oz)/87 g (3.1 oz)/345 g (12.2 oz)/470 g (17 oz) per second of hypergolic propellant flow.
  - CP4: 60 g (2.1 oz) per second of air/nitrogen/oxygen/hydrogen flow.

=== Former Propulsion Products ===
Engines that are no longer produced.

- RDMT-0.4X: N_{2}O_{4}/UDMH rocket engine.
- RDMT-0.8: Nitrogen and helium cold gas thruster.
- RDMT-12: N_{2}O_{4}/UDMH rocket engine.
- RDMT-50: N_{2}O_{4}/UDMH rocket engine.
- RDMT-100: N_{2}O_{4}/UDMH rocket engine.
- RDMT-135 (a.k.a. 11D428A): 135 N (30 lbf) N_{2}O_{4}/UDMH rocket engine. Used on the Soyuz 7K-S, KTDU-426 and initial KTDU-80.
- RDMT-200: 200 N (45 lbf) N_{2}O_{4}/UDMH thruster used on the Almaz space stations.
- RDMT-400A: Experimental version of the RDMT-200 with Niobium combustion chamber.
- RDMT-400X: Experimental version of the RDMT-200 with Carbon combustion chamber.

== See also ==
- NII-1 — The research institute where NIIMash started.
- Russian Federal Space Agency — The corporate parent of KB KhIMMASH.
