= Phosphorus tetroxide =

Names
- Other names Phosphorus tetroxide Phosphorus(III,V) oxide

Identifiers
| CAS Number | 12137-38-1; (P_{4}O_{7}): 12065-80-4; (P_{4}O_{8}): 12037-06-8; (P_{4}O_{9}): 12037-11-5 |
| 3D model (JSmol) | Interactive image; (P_{4}O_{7}): Interactive image; (P_{4}O_{8}): Interactive image; (P_{4}O_{9}): Interactive image |
| ChemSpider | 17287784; (P_{4}O_{7}): 122796; (P_{4}O_{8}): 122793; (P_{4}O_{9}): 122794 |
| PubChem CID | 16131071; (P_{4}O_{7}): 139226; (P_{4}O_{8}): 139223; (P_{4}O_{9}): 139224 |
| CompTox Dashboard (EPA) | DTXSID50153252; (P_{4}O_{8}): DTXSID10152822; (P_{4}O_{9}): DTXSID70152823 |
- InChI: InChI=1S/O4P2/c1-5-4-6(2)3 Key: PKSMWOJZXCKNBJ-UHFFFAOYSA-N; (P_{4}O_{7}): InChI=1S/O7P4/c1-11-5-8-2-9(6-11)4-10(3-8)7-11 Key: JXMJWGUWYVJTGA-UHFFFAOYSA-N; (P_{4}O_{8}): InChI=1S/O8P4/c1-11-4-9-3-10(5-11)7-12(2,6-9)8-11 Key: BDFGQAKHAFFJCF-UHFFFAOYSA-N; (P_{4}O_{9}): InChI=1S/O9P4/c1-11-4-10-5-12(2,7-11)9-13(3,6-10)8-11 Key: DKJKPKZTNXPRRP-UHFFFAOYSA-N
- SMILES: O=POP(=O)=O; (P_{4}O_{7}): O=P12OP3OP(O1)OP(O3)O2; (P_{4}O_{8}): O=P12OP3OP(O1)OP(=O)(O3)O2; (P_{4}O_{9}): O=P12OP3OP(=O)(O1)OP(=O)(O3)O2

Properties
| Chemical formula | P_{2}O_{4} |
| Molar mass | 125.96 g·mol^{−1} |
| Appearance | Solid |
| Melting point | >100 °C |
| Vapor pressure | 2.54 g·cm^{−3} |
- Except where otherwise noted, data are given for materials in their standard state (at 25 °C [77 °F], 100 kPa). Infobox references

Diphosphorus tetroxide, or phosphorus tetroxide is an inorganic compound of phosphorus and oxygen. It has the molecular chemical formula P_{2}O_{4}. Solid phosphorus tetroxide (also referred to as phosphorus(III,V)-oxide) consists of variable mixtures of the mixed-valence oxides P_{4}O_{7}, P_{4}O_{8} and P_{4}O_{9}.

== Preparation ==
Phosphorus tetroxide can be produced by thermal decomposition of phosphorus trioxide, which disproportionates above 210 °C to form phosphorus tetroxide, with elemental phosphorus as a byproduct:

8 P_{2}O_{3} ⇌ P_{4} + 6 P_{2}O_{4}

In addition, phosphorus trioxide can be converted into phosphorus tetroxide by controlled oxidation with oxygen in carbon tetrachloride solution.

Careful reduction of phosphorus pentoxide with red phosphorus at 450–525 °C also produces phosphorus tetroxide.
