= Venera 1 =

Soviet space probe launched in 1961; first spacecraft to fly by Venus

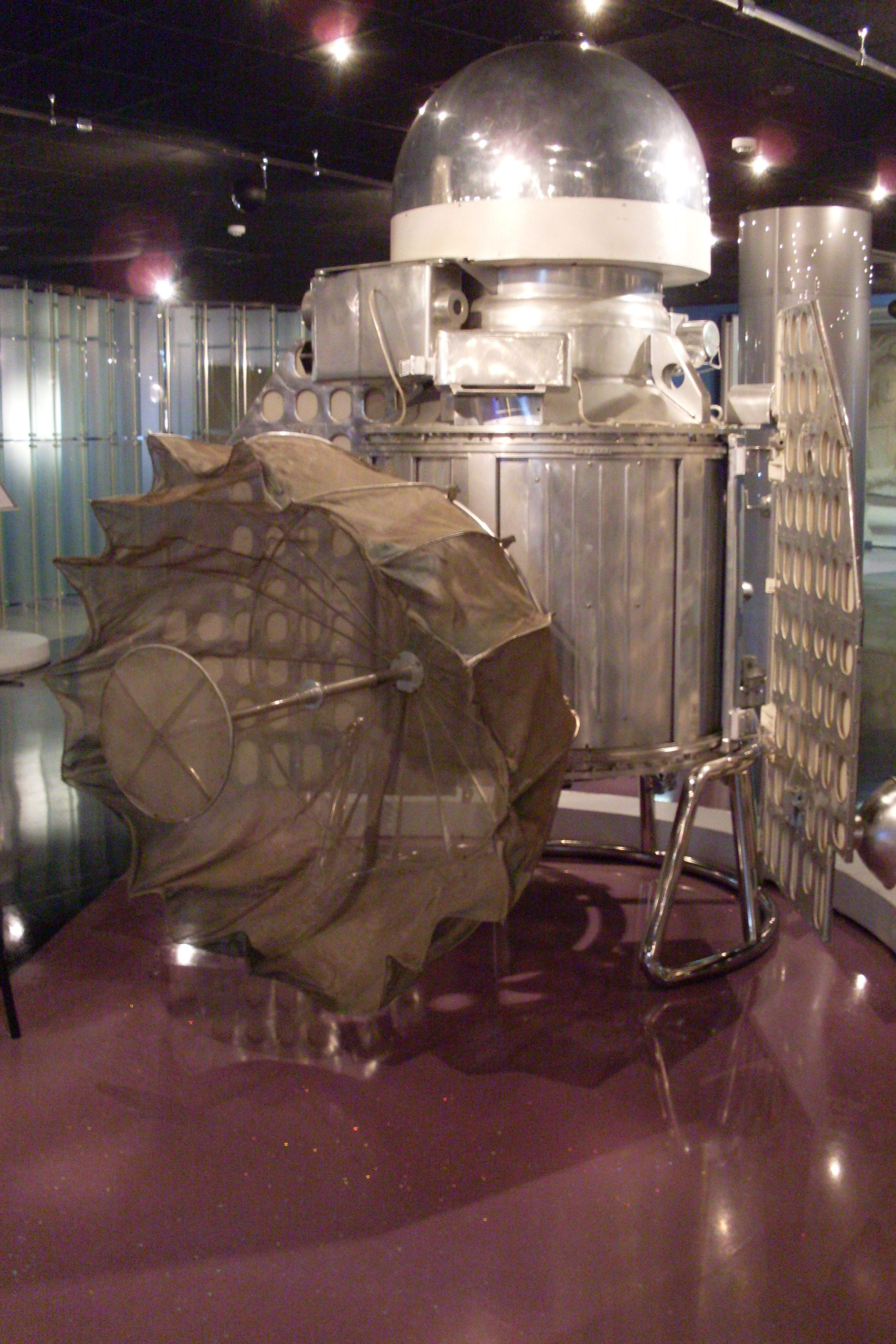
- Mockup of the Venera 1 spacecraft
- Mission type: Venus impactor
- Operator: OKB-1
- Harvard designation: 1961 Gamma 1
- COSPAR ID: 1961-003A
- SATCAT no.: 80
- Mission duration: 7 days

Spacecraft properties
- Spacecraft: 1VA No.2
- Manufacturer: OKB-1
- Launch mass: 6,424.0 kilograms (14,162.5 lb)
- Dry mass: 643.5 kilograms (1,419 lb)

Start of mission
- Launch date: 12 February 1961, 00:34:36 UTC
- Rocket: Molniya 8K78
- Launch site: Baikonur 1/5

End of mission
- Last contact: 19 February 1961

Orbital parameters
- Reference system: Heliocentric
- Eccentricity: 0.173
- Perihelion altitude: 0.718 AU
- Aphelion altitude: 1.019 AU
- Inclination: 0.58°
- Period: 311 days

Flyby of Venus
- Closest approach: 19 May 1961
- Distance: 100,000 km (62,000 mi)
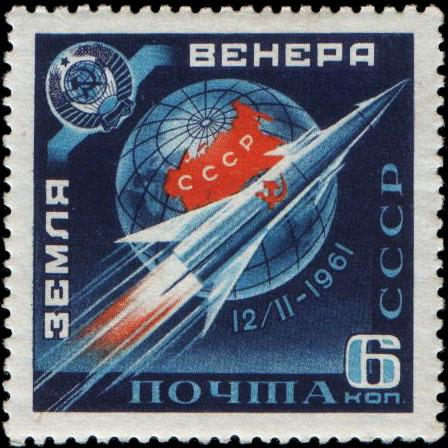
- Venera

Venera 1 (Russian: Венера-1 meaning Venus 1), also known as Venera-1VA No.2 and occasionally in the West as Sputnik 8, was the first spacecraft to perform an interplanetary flight and the first to fly past Venus, as part of the Soviet Union's Venera programme. Launched in February 1961, it was intended as an impactor, but flew past Venus on 19 May of the same year; however, radio contact with the probe was lost before the flyby, resulting in returning only some data and only from interplanetary space.

== Spacecraft ==
Venera 1 was a 643.5-kilogram (1,419 lb) probe consisting of a cylindrical body 1.05 metres (3 ft 5 in) in diameter topped by a dome, totalling 2.035 metres (6 ft 8.1 in) in height. This was pressurized to 1.2 standard atmospheres (120 kPa) with dry nitrogen, with internal fans to maintain even distribution of heat. Two solar panels extended from the cylinder, charging a bank of silver-zinc batteries. A 2-metre (6 ft 7 in) parabolic wire-mesh antenna was designed to send data from Venus to Earth on a frequency of 922.8 MHz. A 2.4-metre (7 ft 10 in) antenna boom was used to transmit short-wave signals during the near-Earth phase of the mission. Semidirectional quadrupole antennas mounted on the solar panels provided routine telemetry and telecommand contact with Earth during the mission, on a circularly-polarized decimetre radio band.

The probe was equipped with scientific instruments including a flux-gate magnetometer attached to the antenna boom, two ion traps to measure solar wind, micrometeorite detectors, and Geiger counter tubes and a sodium iodide scintillator for measurement of cosmic radiation. An experiment attached to one solar panel measured temperatures of experimental coatings. Infrared and/or ultraviolet radiometers may have been included. The dome contained a KDU-414 engine used for mid-course corrections. Temperature control was achieved by motorized thermal shutters.

During most of its flight, Venera 1 was spin stabilized. It was the first spacecraft designed to perform mid-course corrections, by entering a mode of 3-axis stabilization, fixing on the Sun and the star Canopus. Had it reached Venus, it would have entered another mode of 3-axis stabilization, fixing on the Sun and Earth, and using for the first time a parabolic antenna to relay data.

== Launch ==
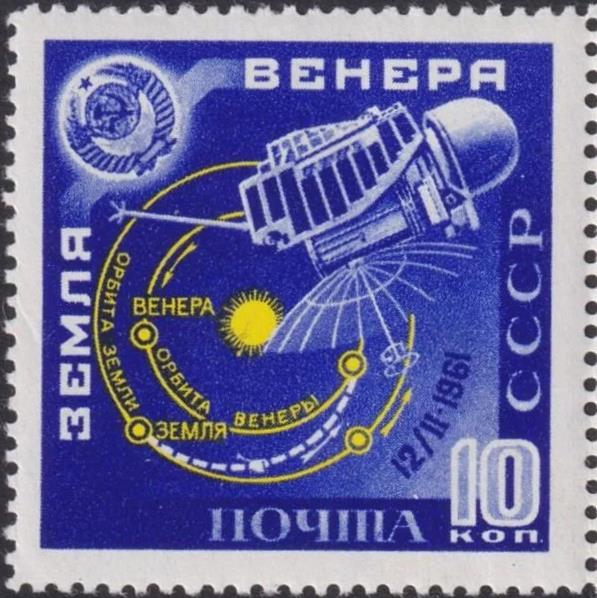
Route of Venera 1 on a Soviet stamp

Venera 1 was the second of two attempts to launch a probe to Venus in February 1961, immediately following the launch of its sister ship Venera-1VA No.1, which failed to leave Earth orbit due to the failure of a power transformer. The transformer was wrapped in foil and painted black and white for thermal reasons. Soviet experts launched Venera-1 using a Molniya carrier rocket from the Baikonur Cosmodrome. The launch took place at 00:34:36 GMT on 12 February 1961. Vehicle L1-6V steered downrange into a clear blue winter sky and orbit was successfully achieved.

The spacecraft, along with the rocket's Blok-L upper stage, was initially placed into a 229-by-282-kilometre (142 mi × 175 mi) low Earth orbit, before the upper stage fired to place "Venera 1" into a heliocentric orbit, directed towards Venus. The 11D33 engine was the world's first staged-combustion-cycle rocket engine, and also the first use of an ullage engine to allow a liquid-fuel rocket engine to start in space.

== Failure ==
During the first telemetry session, it was found that Venera 1 failed to enter the constant solar orientation mode, which led to a shortage of electrical power on board. While unfortunate, this was expected and in such a case the station had to conduct a rough orientation to the Sun and turn off non-vital systems. However, the radio transmitters had not been adequately designed and communication was shortly lost. The signal was regained on 17 February but it was still unable to lock onto the Sun properly and again went into protective mode and turned off the transmitter. Three successful telemetry sessions were conducted, gathering solar-wind and cosmic-ray data near Earth, at the Earth's magnetopause, and on 19 February at a distance of 1,900,000 km (1,200,000 mi). After discovering the solar wind with Luna 2, Venera 1 provided the first verification that this plasma was uniformly present in deep space. Seven days later, the next scheduled telemetry session failed to occur. On 19 May 1961, Venera 1 passed within 100,000 km (62,000 mi) of Venus. With the help of the British radio telescope at Jodrell Bank, some weak signals from Venera 1 may have been detected in June. Soviet engineers believed that Venera 1 failed due to the overheating of a solar-direction sensor.

== See also ==
- List of missions to Venus
- Mariner 2
- Timeline of planetary exploration
