= Arsenic tetroxide =

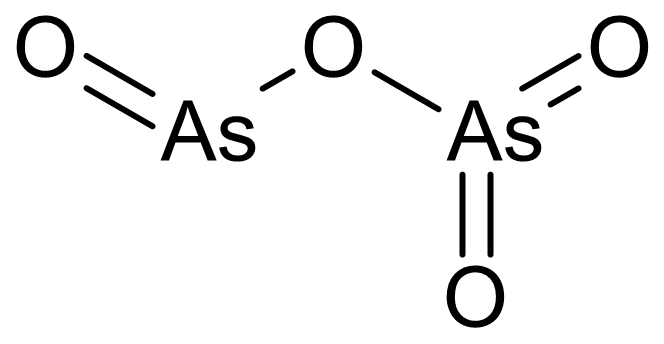

Names
- IUPAC name Arsenic(III,V) dioxide

Identifiers
CAS Number	17306-35-3
3D model (JSmol)	Interactive image
ChemSpider	139256
PubChem CID	20288961
CompTox Dashboard (EPA)	DTXSID601356581 DTXSID50938283, DTXSID601356581
- InChI: InChI=1S/2As.4O/q+3;+5;;;; Key: RAKBAHUVRSFKQD-UHFFFAOYSA-N
- SMILES: [O]=[As][O][As](=O)=O

Properties
Chemical formula	As_{2}O_{4}
Molar mass	213.839 g·mol^{−1}

Hazards
- NIOSH (US health exposure limits)
PEL (Permissible)	[1910.1018] TWA 0.010 mg/m^{3}
REL (Recommended)	Ca C 0.002 mg/m^{3} [15-minute]
IDLH (Immediate danger)	Ca [5 mg/m^{3} (as As)]
- Except where otherwise noted, data are given for materials in their standard state (at 25 °C [77 °F], 100 kPa). Infobox references

Arsenic tetroxide is an inorganic compound with the chemical formula As_{2}O_{4}, containing As(III) and As(V), As^{III}As^{V}O_{4}.

== Synthesis ==
It can be synthesized in an autoclave via the following reaction:

2 As_{2}O_{3} + O_{2} → 2 As_{2}O_{4}

== Structure ==
It adopts a layer structure, and the coordination geometry of As(III) is triangular pyramid while As(V) is tetrahedral.
