= Progress M-36 =

Russian cargo spacecraft

- A Progress-M spacecraft
- Mission type: Mir resupply
- COSPAR ID: 1997-058A
- SATCAT no.: 25002

Spacecraft properties
- Spacecraft: Progress (No.236)
- Spacecraft type: Progress-M
- Manufacturer: RKK Energia

Start of mission
- Launch date: 5 October 1997, 15:08:57 UTC
- Rocket: Soyuz-U
- Launch site: Baikonur, Site 1/5

End of mission
- Disposal: Deorbited
- Decay date: 19 December 1997, 13:20:01 UTC

Orbital parameters
- Reference system: Geocentric
- Regime: Low Earth
- Perigee altitude: 193 km
- Apogee altitude: 246 km
- Inclination: 51.6°
- Period: 88.6 minutes
- Epoch: 5 October 1997

Docking with Mir
- Docking port: Kvant-1 aft
- Docking date: 8 October 1997, 17:07:09 UTC
- Undocking date: 17 December 1997, 06:01:53 UTC

Progress M-36 (Russian: Прогресс M-36) was a Russian unmanned Progress cargo spacecraft, which was launched in October 1997 to resupply the Mir space station.

== Launch ==
Progress M-36 launched on 5 October 1997 from the Baikonur Cosmodrome in Kazakhstan. It used a Soyuz-U rocket.

== Docking ==
Progress M-36 docked with the aft port of the Kvant-1 module of Mir on 8 October 1997 at 17:07:09 UTC, and was undocked on 17 December 1997 at 06:01:53 UTC.

== Decay ==
It remained in orbit until 19 December 1997, when it was deorbited. The deorbit burn occurred at 13:20:01 UTC, with the mission ending at 13:59:01 UTC.

== See also ==
- 1997 in spaceflight
- List of Progress missions
- List of uncrewed spaceflights to Mir
