= Aleksei Isaev =

Russian rocket engineer (1908–1971)

- Алексей Исаев
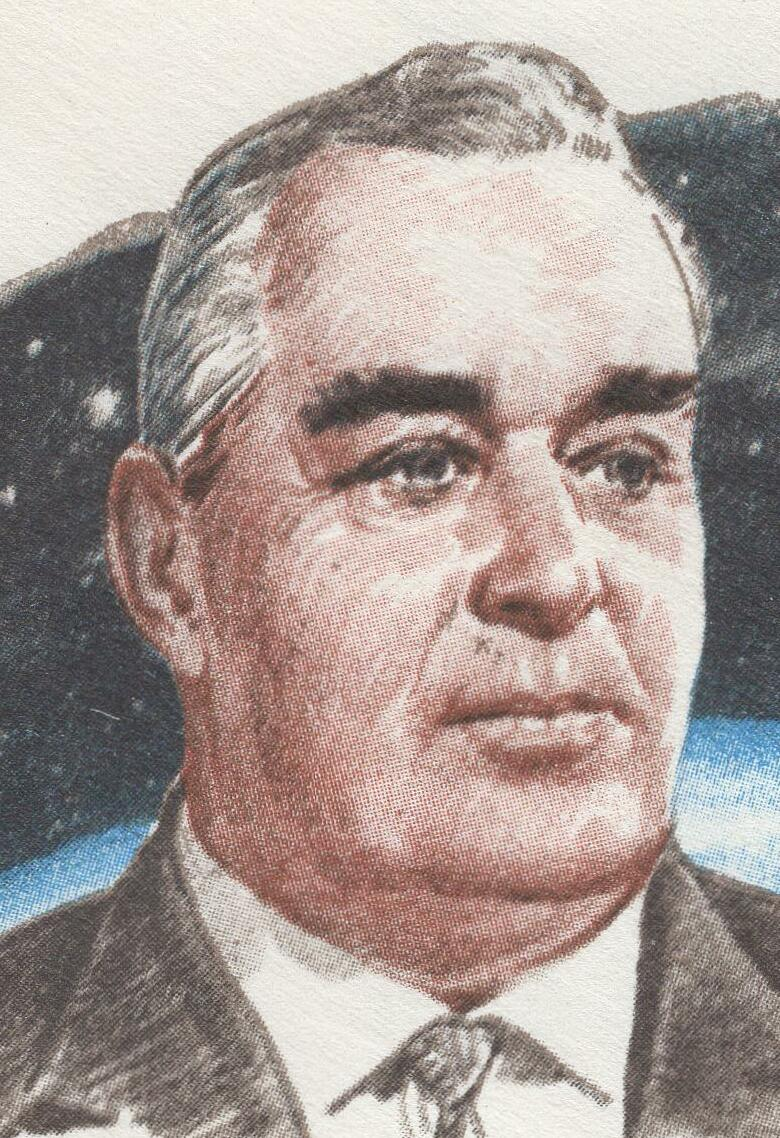
- From a 1978 postal stationery envelope
- Born: October 24, 1908; Saint Petersburg, Russian Empire
- Died: June 10, 1971 (aged 62); Moscow, Soviet Union
- Citizenship: Soviet Union
- Engineering career
- Discipline: Engineering (Combustion)
- Institutions: Soviet space program
- Employers: TsNIIMash; OKB-2
- Projects: BI-1
- Significant design: Staged combustion

Aleksei Mikhailovich Isaev (also Isayev; Russian: Алексе́й Миха́йлович Иса́ев; October 24, 1908, in Saint Petersburg – June 10, 1971, in Moscow) was a Soviet engineer in the Soviet space program, working on rocket combustion and propellant.

Aleksei Isaev began work under Leonid Dushkin during World War II, on an experimental rocket-powered interceptor plane, the BI-1. In 1944 he formed his own design bureau to engineer liquid-propellant engines. After abandoning the heavy, complex and undercooled German engine designs, Russia's principal engine designer Valentin Glushko turned to Isaev's innovations: thin-walled copper combustion chambers backed by steel support, anti-oscillation baffle to prevent chugging, and the flat injector plate with mixing-swirling injectors. The latter was an enormous simplification of the "plumbing nightmare" of the V-2 engine, because it avoided the need for separate fuel lines to each sprayer. Staged combustion (Замкнутая схема) was first proposed by Alexey Isaev in 1949.

Although his inventions influenced the design of Glushko's large engines, Isaev was better known for building efficient small rockets. He designed engines for the Soviet anti-missile and anti-aircraft rockets, and in 1951, his engine powered the R-11 Zemlya short-range missile, later named the Scud. He designed a series of course-correction engines for Soviet planetary probes, including the KDU-414 used in Venera 1, Mars 1 up to Venera 8, the KTDU-425 used in later planetary probes, KTDU-5 used in the Soviet lunar landers Luna 4 to Luna 13.

Isaev was a corresponding member of the USSR Academy of Sciences.

A.M. Isayev Chemical Engineering Design Bureau is named after him.

The crater Isaev on the far side of the Moon is named after him.
