= Pressure-fed engine =

Rocket engine operation method

Pressure-fed rocket cycle. Propellant tanks are pressurized to directly supply fuel and oxidizer to the engine, eliminating the need for turbopumps.

The pressure-fed engine is a class of rocket engine designs. A separate gas supply, usually helium, pressurizes the propellant tanks to force fuel and oxidizer to the combustion chamber. To maintain adequate flow, the tank pressures must exceed the combustion chamber pressure.

Pressure fed engines have simple plumbing and have no need for complex and occasionally unreliable turbopumps. A typical startup procedure begins with opening a valve, often a one-shot pyrotechnic device, to allow the pressurizing gas to flow through check valves into the propellant tanks. Then the propellant valves in the engine itself are opened. If the fuel and oxidizer are hypergolic, they burn on contact; non-hypergolic fuels require an igniter. Multiple burns can be conducted by merely opening and closing the propellant valves as needed. If the pressurization system also has activating valves, they can be operated electrically, or by gas pressure controlled by smaller electrically operated valves.

Care must be taken, especially during long burns, to avoid excessive cooling of the pressurizing gas due to adiabatic expansion. Cold helium won't liquefy, but it could freeze a propellant, decrease tank pressures, or damage components not designed for low temperatures. The Apollo Lunar Module Descent Propulsion System was unusual in storing its helium in a supercritical but very cold state. It was warmed as it was withdrawn through a heat exchanger from the ambient temperature fuel.

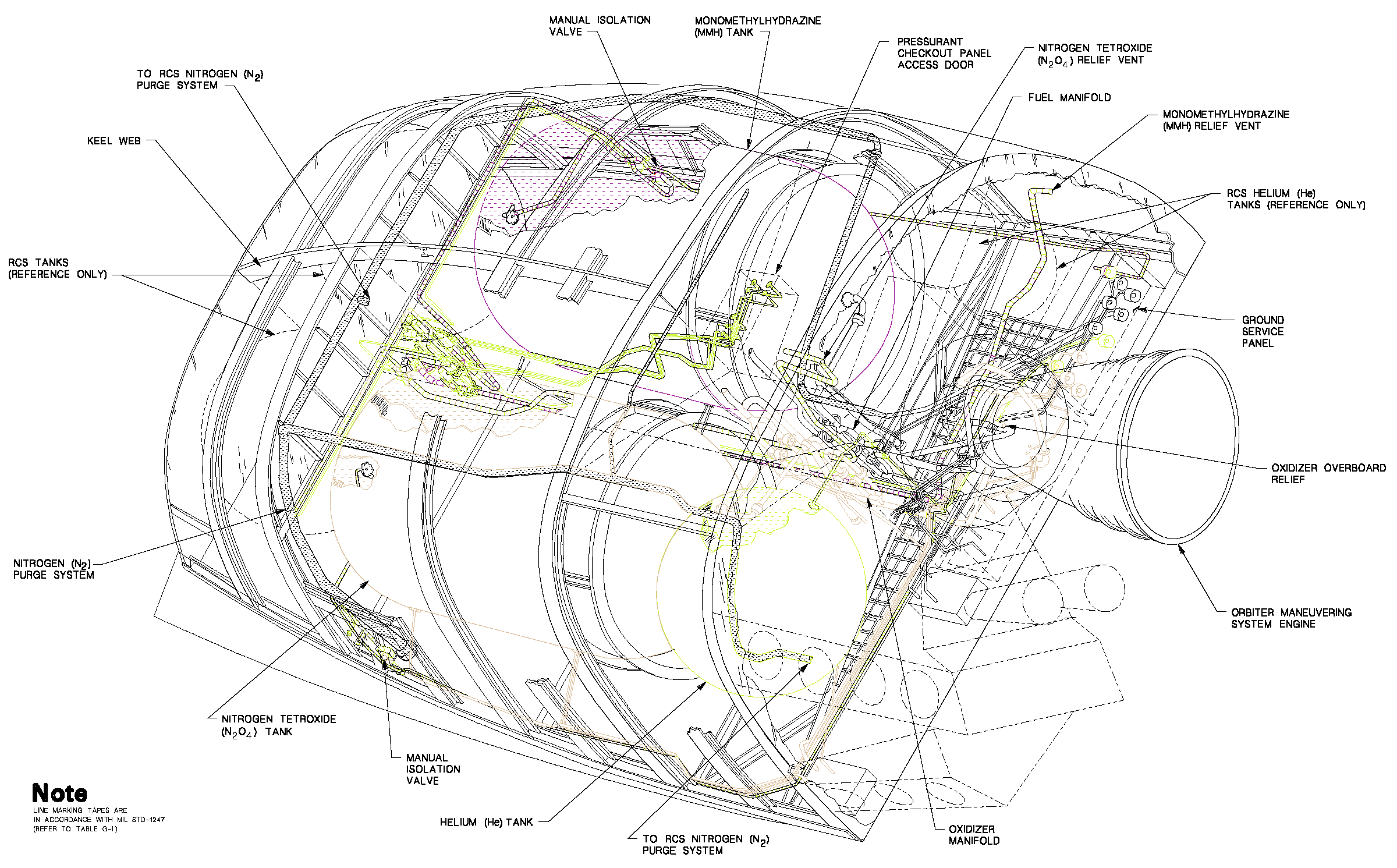
This is a diagram of the pressure fed, reusable Orbital Manouevering System pod, of which there were two on either side of the shuttle’s stabiliser. It was used on the Space Shuttle orbiter (or simply Space Shuttle) for orbital insertion, manoeuvring the orbiter in space, and the deorbit burn. The AJ10-190 engines could be reused for up to 100 missions.

Diagram of an RS-25 (or Space Shuttle Main Engine), that used a twin shaft staged combustion cycle. There were three of these on the back of the orbiter. Comparing the diagram of the RS-25 to that of the Orbital Manoeuvring System (OMS), it is clear that the RS-25 engine is far more complex. The record for the most space shuttle missions on which an individual RS-25 engine has been used is 19.

Spacecraft attitude control and orbital maneuvering thrusters are almost universally pressure-fed designs. Examples include the Reaction Control (RCS) and the Orbital Maneuvering (OMS) engines of the Space Shuttle orbiter; the RCS and Service Propulsion System (SPS) engines on the Apollo Command/Service Module; the SuperDraco (in-flight abort) and Draco (RCS) engines on the SpaceX Dragon 2; and the RCS, ascent and descent engines on the Apollo Lunar Module.

Some launcher upper stages also use pressure-fed engines. These include the Aerojet AJ10 and TRW TR-201 used in the second stage of Delta II launch vehicle, and the Kestrel engine of the Falcon 1 by SpaceX.

The 1960s Sea Dragon concept by Robert Truax for a big dumb booster would have used pressure-fed engines.

Pressure-fed engines have practical limits on propellant pressure, which in turn limits combustion chamber pressure. High pressure propellant tanks require thicker walls and stronger materials which make the vehicle tanks heavier, thereby reducing performance and payload capacity. The lower stages of launch vehicles often use either solid fuel or pump-fed liquid fuel engines instead, where high pressure ratio nozzles are considered desirable.

Other vehicles or companies using pressure-fed engine:

- OTRAG (rocket)
- Quad (rocket) of Armadillo Aerospace
- XCOR EZ-Rocket of XCOR Aerospace
- Masten Space Systems
- Aquarius Launch Vehicle
- NASA's Project Morpheus prototype lander
- NASA Mighty Eagle mini lunar lander
- CONAE's Tronador II upper stage
- Copenhagen Suborbitals' Spica

== See also ==
- Gas-generator cycle
- Combustion tap-off cycle
- Expander cycle
- Staged combustion cycle
- Electric-pump-fed engine
