= Red fuming nitric acid =

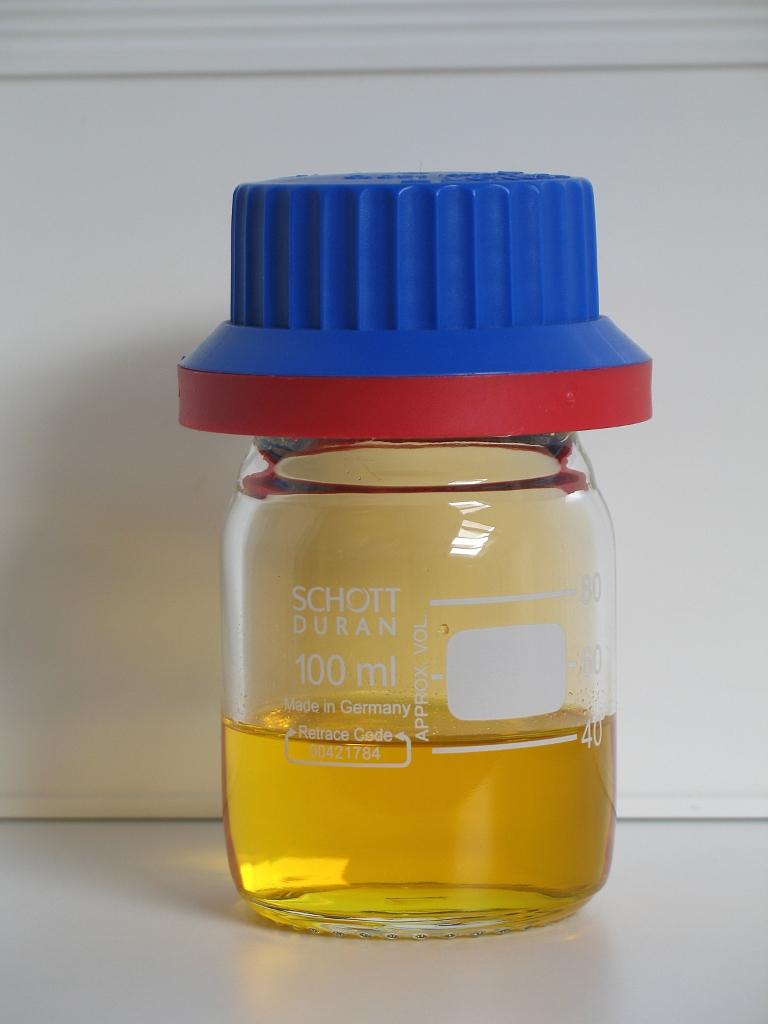

Names
- IUPAC name Nitric acid
- Other names Red fuming nitric acid

Identifiers
CAS Number	52583-42-3

Properties
Chemical formula	HNO_{3} + NO_{2}
Appearance	Liquid, red fumes
Density	Increases as free NO_{2} content increases
Boiling point	83 °C (181 °F; 356 K)
Solubility in water	Miscible in water

Hazards
- Occupational safety and health (OHS/OSH)
Main hazards	Skin and metal corrosion; serious eye damage; toxic (oral, dermal, pulmonary); severe burns
- Except where otherwise noted, data are given for materials in their standard state (at 25 °C [77 °F], 100 kPa). verify (what is ?) Infobox references

Red fuming nitric acid (RFNA) is a strong and storage-stable oxidizer. It consists of nitric acid (HNO_{3}), dinitrogen tetroxide (N_{2}O_{4}) and a small amount of water. The color of red fuming nitric acid is due to the dinitrogen tetroxide, which breaks down partially to form the reddish-brown nitrogen dioxide. The nitrogen dioxide dissolves until the liquid is saturated, and produces toxic fumes with a suffocating odor. RFNA increases the flammability of combustible materials and is highly exothermic when reacting with water.

It is commonly used in bipropellant rockets as the oxidizer. It can also be a component of a monopropellant; with substances like amine nitrates dissolved in it, it can be used as the sole fuel in a rocket. This is inefficient and it is not normally used this way.

Since nitrogen dioxide is a product of decomposition of nitric acid, its addition stabilizes nitric acid in accordance with Le Chatelier's principle. Addition of dinitrogen tetroxide also increases oxidizing power and lowers the freezing point.

It is usually used with an inhibitor because nitric acid attacks most container materials. There are many inhibitors to use, with various, sometimes secret, substances, including hydrogen fluoride. Hydrogen fluoride for instance will passivate the container metal with a thin layer of metal fluoride, making it nearly impervious to the nitric acid. Any combination of RFNA with inhibitor is called inhibited RFNA, or IRFNA.

Inhibited RFNA was the oxidizer of the world's most-launched light orbital rocket, the Kosmos-3M. In former-Soviet countries, inhibited RFNA is known as Mélange.

During World War II, the German military used RFNA in some rockets. The mixtures used were called S-Stoff (96% nitric acid with 4% ferric chloride as an ignition catalyst) and SV-Stoff (94% nitric acid with 6% dinitrogen tetroxide) and nicknamed Salbei (sage).

Other uses for RFNA include fertilizers, dye intermediates, explosives, and pharmaceutical acidifiers. It can also be used as a laboratory reagent in photoengraving and metal etching.

== Compositions ==
- IRFNA IIIa: 83.4% HNO_{3}, 14% NO_{2}, 2% H_{2}O, 0.6% HF
- IRFNA IV HDA: 54.3% HNO_{3}, 44% NO_{2}, 1% H_{2}O, 0.7% HF
- S-Stoff: 96% HNO_{3}, 4% FeCl_{3}
- SV-Stoff: 94% HNO_{3}, 6% N_{2}O_{4}
- AK20: 80% HNO_{3}, 20% N_{2}O_{4}
- AK20F: 80% HNO_{3}, 20% N_{2}O_{4}, fluorine-based inhibitor
- AK20I: 80% HNO_{3}, 20% N_{2}O_{4}, iodine-based inhibitor
- AK20K: 80% HNO_{3}, 20% N_{2}O_{4}, potassium-based inhibitor
- AK27I: 73% HNO_{3}, 27% N_{2}O_{4}, iodine-based inhibitor
- AK27P: 73% HNO_{3}, 27% N_{2}O_{4}, phosphorus-based inhibitor

== Corrosion ==
Hydrofluoric acid content of IRFNA
When RFNA is used as an oxidizer for rocket fuels, it usually has a HF content of about 0.6%. The HF forms a metal fluoride layer on the surface of the storage vessels, inhibiting corrosion.
Water content of RFNA
To test the water content, a sample of 80% HNO_{3}, 8–20% NO_{2}, and the rest H_{2}O depending on the varied amount of NO_{2} in the sample. When the RFNA contained HF, there was an average H_{2}O% between 2.4% and 4.2%. When the RFNA did not contain HF, there was an average H_{2}O% between 0.1% and 5.0%. When the metal impurities from corrosion were taken into account, the H_{2}O% increased, and the H_{2}O% was between 2.2% and 8.8%
Corrosion of metals in RFNA
Stainless steel, aluminium alloys, iron alloys, chrome plates, tin, gold and tantalum were tested to see how RFNA affected the corrosion rates of each. Experiments were performed using 16% and 6.5% RFNA samples and the different substances listed above. Many different stainless steels showed resistance to corrosion. Aluminium alloys did not endure as well as stainless steels especially in high temperature, but the corrosion rates were not high enough to prohibit the use of this with RFNA. Tin, gold and tantalum showed high corrosion resistance similar to that of stainless steel. These materials are better though because at high temperatures the corrosion rates did not increase much. Corrosion rates at elevated temperatures increase in the presence of phosphoric acid. Sulfuric acid decreased corrosion rates.

== See also ==
- White fuming nitric acid
