= Dinitrogen tetroxide =

Full structural formula
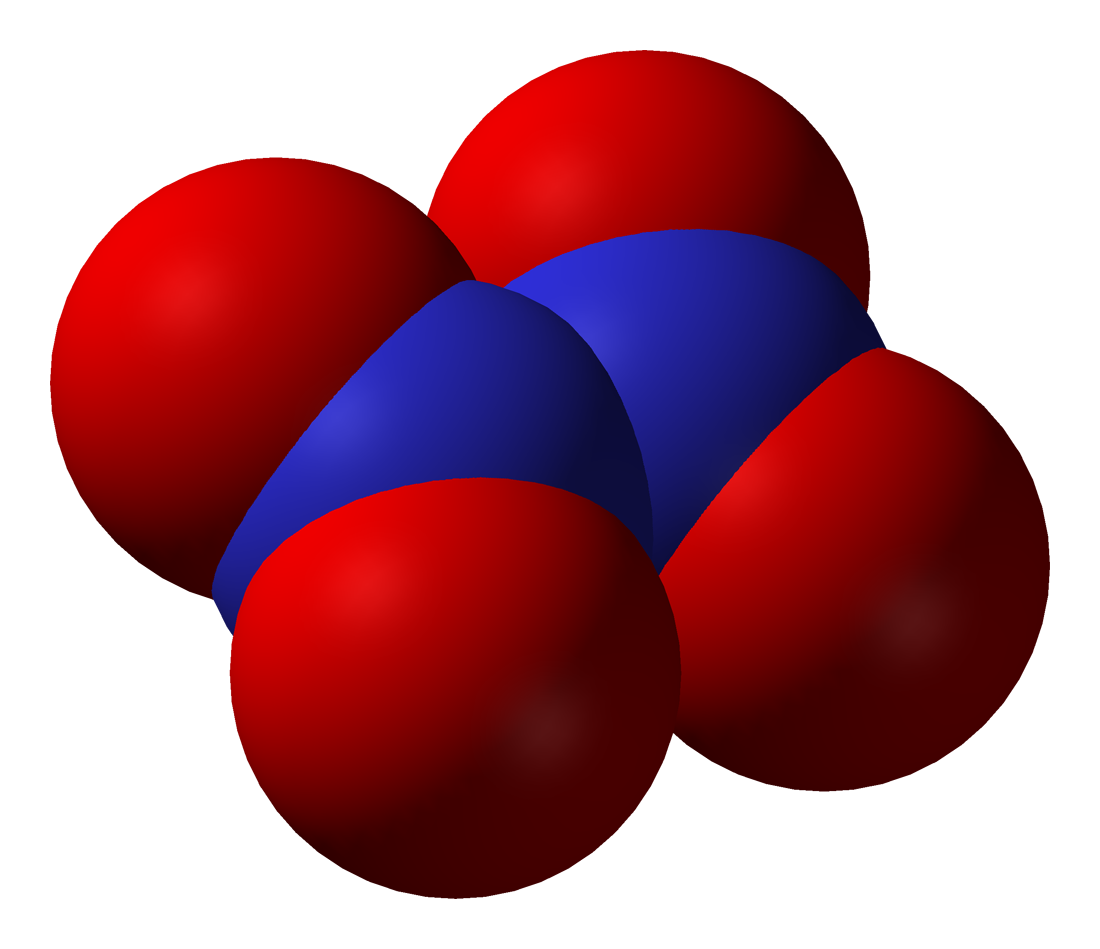
Space-filling model
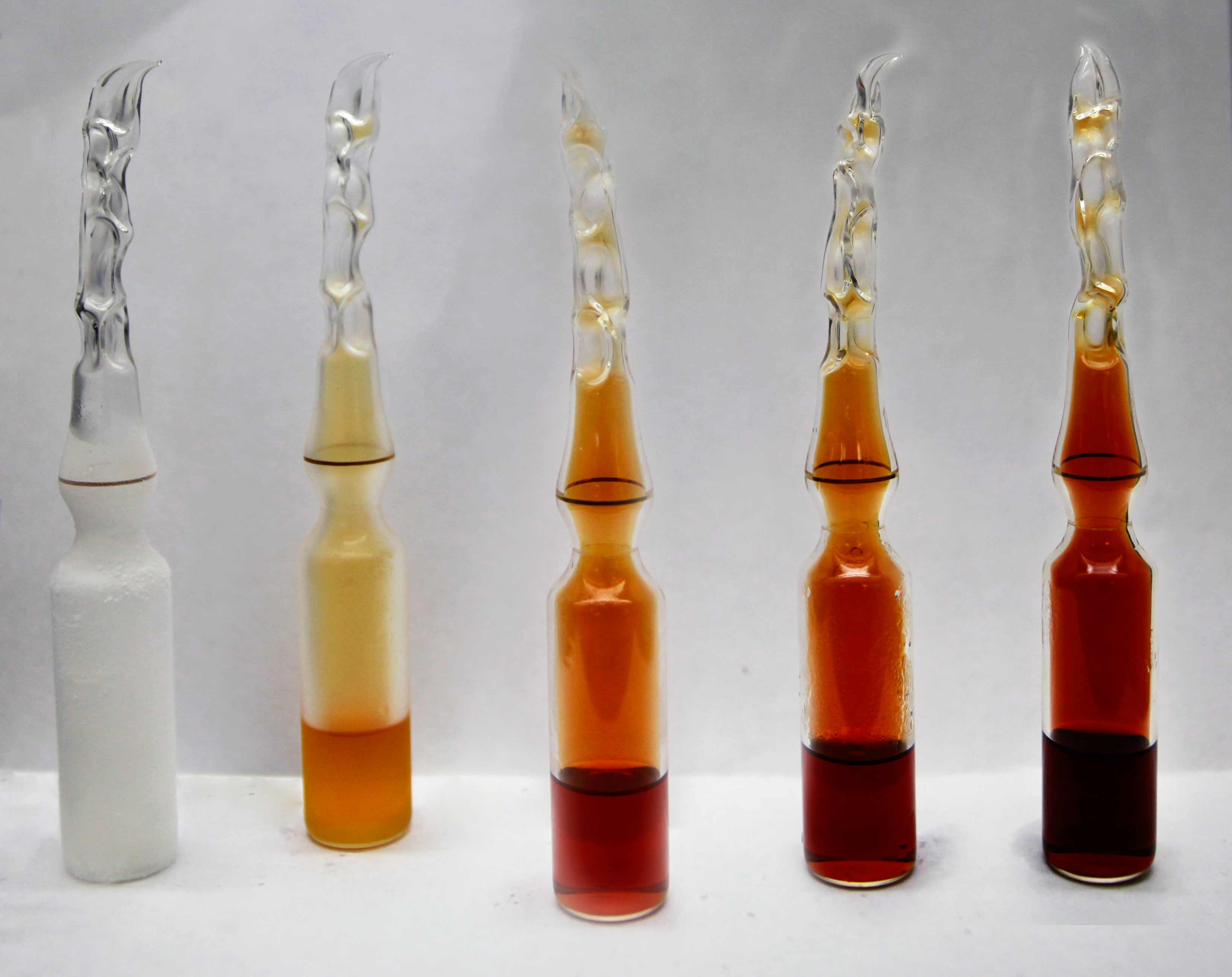
- Nitrogen dioxide at different temperatures Nitrogen dioxide (NO_{2}) at −196 °C, 0 °C, 23 °C, 35 °C, and 50 °C. NO_{2} converts to the colorless dinitrogen tetroxide (N_{2}O_{4}) at low temperatures, and reverts to NO_{2} at higher temperatures.

Names
- IUPAC name Dinitrogen tetroxide

Identifiers
CAS Number	10544-72-6
3D model (JSmol)	Interactive image
ChEBI	CHEBI:29803
ChemSpider	23681
ECHA InfoCard	100.031.012
EC Number	234-126-4
Gmelin Reference	2249
PubChem CID	25352
RTECS number	QW9800000
UNII	M9APC3P75A
UN number	1067
CompTox Dashboard (EPA)	DTXSID00893116
- InChI: InChI=1S/N2O4/c3-1(4)2(5)6 Key: WFPZPJSADLPSON-UHFFFAOYSA-N; InChI=1/N2O4/c3-1(4)2(5)6 Key: WFPZPJSADLPSON-UHFFFAOYAS
- SMILES: [O-][N+](=O)[N+]([O-])=O

Properties
Chemical formula	N_{2}O_{4}
Molar mass	92.010 g·mol^{−1}
Appearance	White solid, colorless liquid, orange gas
Density	1.44246 g/cm^{3} (liquid, 21 °C)
Melting point	−11.2 °C (11.8 °F; 261.9 K) and decomposes to NO_{2}
Boiling point	21.69 °C (71.04 °F; 294.84 K)
Solubility in water	Reacts to form nitrous and nitric acids
Vapor pressure	96 kPa (20 °C)
Magnetic susceptibility (χ)	−23.0·10^{−6} cm^{3}/mol
Refractive index (n_{D})	1.00112

Structure
Molecular shape	Planar, D_{2h}
Dipole moment	small, non-zero

Thermochemistry
Std molar entropy (S^{⦵}_{298})	304.29 J/K⋅mol
Std enthalpy of formation (Δ_{f}H^{⦵}_{298})	+9.16 kJ/mol

Hazards
- GHS labelling
Pictograms	(GHS03: Oxidizing) (GHS05: Corrosive) (GHS06: Toxic) (GHS07: Exclamation mark)
Signal word	Danger
Hazard statements	H270, H314, H330, H335, H336
Precautionary statements	P220, P244, P260, P264, P271, P280, P284, P301+P330+P331, P303+P361+P353, P304+P340, P305+P351+P338, P310, P312, P320, P321, P363, P370+P376, P403, P403+P233, P405, P410+P403, P501
NFPA 704 (fire diamond)	3 0 0 OX
Flash point	Non-flammable
Safety data sheet (SDS)	External SDS

Related compounds
Related nitrogen oxides	Nitrous oxide; Nitric oxide; Dinitrogen trioxide; Nitrogen dioxide; Dinitrogen pentoxide
Related compounds	Phosphorus tetroxide; Arsenic tetroxide; Antimony tetroxide
- Except where otherwise noted, data are given for materials in their standard state (at 25 °C [77 °F], 100 kPa). verify (what is ?) Infobox references

Dinitrogen tetroxide, commonly referred to as nitrogen tetroxide (NTO), and occasionally (usually among ex-USSR/Russian rocket engineers) as amyl, is the chemical compound N_{2}O_{4}. It is a useful reagent in chemical synthesis. It forms an equilibrium mixture with nitrogen dioxide. Its molar mass is 92.011 g/mol.

Dinitrogen tetroxide is a powerful oxidizer that is hypergolic (spontaneously ignites) upon contact with various forms of hydrazine, which has made the pair a common bipropellant for rockets.

== Structure and properties ==
Dinitrogen tetroxide could be regarded as two nitro groups (-NO_{2}) bonded together. It forms an equilibrium mixture with nitrogen dioxide. The molecule is planar with an N-N bond distance of 1.78 Å and N-O distances of 1.19 Å. The N-N distance corresponds to a weak bond, since it is significantly longer than the average N-N single bond length of 1.45 Å. This exceptionally weak σ bond (amounting to overlapping of the sp^{2} hybrid orbitals of the two NO_{2} units) results from the simultaneous delocalization of the bonding electron pair across the whole N_{2}O_{4} molecule, and the considerable electrostatic repulsion of the doubly occupied molecular orbitals of each NO_{2} unit.

Unlike NO_{2}, N_{2}O_{4} is diamagnetic since it has no unpaired electrons. The liquid is also colorless but can appear as a brownish-yellow liquid due to the presence of NO_{2} according to the following equilibrium:

N_{2}O_{4} ⇌ 2 NO_{2} (ΔH = +57.23 kJ/mol)

Higher temperatures push the equilibrium towards nitrogen dioxide. Inevitably, some dinitrogen tetroxide is a component of smog containing nitrogen dioxide.

Solid N_{2}O_{4} is white, and melts at −11.2 °C.

== Production ==
Nitrogen tetroxide is made by the catalytic oxidation of ammonia (the Ostwald process): steam is used as a diluent to reduce the combustion temperature. In the first step, the ammonia is oxidized into nitric oxide:

4 NH_{3} + 5 O_{2} → 4 NO + 6 H_{2}O

Most of the water is condensed out, and the gases are further cooled; the nitric oxide that was produced is oxidized to nitrogen dioxide, which is then dimerized into nitrogen tetroxide:

2 NO + O_{2} → 2 NO_{2}
2 NO_{2} ⇌ N_{2}O_{4},

and the remainder of the water is removed as nitric acid. The gas is essentially pure nitrogen dioxide, which is condensed into dinitrogen tetroxide in a brine-cooled liquefier.

Dinitrogen tetroxide can also be made through the reaction of concentrated nitric acid and metallic copper. This synthesis is practical in a laboratory setting. Dinitrogen tetroxide can also be produced by heating metal nitrates. The oxidation of copper by nitric acid is a complex reaction forming various nitrogen oxides of varying stability, which depends on the concentration of the nitric acid, presence of oxygen, and other factors. The unstable species further react to form nitrogen dioxide, which is then purified and condensed to form dinitrogen tetroxide.

== Use as a rocket propellant ==
Nitrogen tetroxide is used as an oxidizing agent in some of the most important rocket propellant systems because it can be stored as a liquid at room temperature. Pedro Paulet, a Peruvian polymath, reported in 1927 that he had experimented in the 1890s with a rocket engine that used spring-loaded nozzles that periodically introduced vaporized nitrogen tetroxide and a petroleum benzine to a spark plug for ignition, with the engine putting out 300 pulsating explosions per minute. Paulet would go on to visit the German rocket association Verein für Raumschiffahrt (VfR) and on March 15, 1928, Max Valier applauded Paulet's liquid-propelled rocket design in the VfR publication Die Rakete, saying the engine had "amazing power". Paulet would soon be approached by Nazi Germany to help develop rocket technology, though he refused to assist and never shared the formula for his propellant.

In early 1944, research on the usability of dinitrogen tetroxide as an oxidizing agent for rocket fuel was conducted by German scientists, although the Germans only used it to a very limited extent as an additive for S-Stoff (fuming nitric acid). It became the storable oxidizer of choice for many rockets in both the United States and USSR by the late 1950s. It is a hypergolic propellant in combination with a hydrazine-based rocket fuel. One of the earliest uses of this combination was on the Titan family of rockets used originally as ICBMs and then as launch vehicles for many spacecraft. Used on the US Gemini and Apollo spacecraft and also on the Space Shuttle, it continues to be used as station-keeping propellant on most geostationary satellites and many deep-space probes. It is also the primary oxidizer for Russia's Proton rocket.

When used as a propellant, dinitrogen tetroxide is usually referred to simply as nitrogen tetroxide, and the abbreviation NTO is extensively used. Additionally, NTO is often used with the addition of a small percentage of nitric oxide that reacts to form dinitrogen trioxide, which inhibits stress-corrosion cracking of titanium alloys, and in this form, propellant-grade NTO is referred to as mixed oxides of nitrogen (MON) and can be distinguished by its green-blue color. Larger additions of nitric oxide, up to 25–30%, also lower the freezing point of NTO, improving storability in space conditions. Most spacecraft now use MON instead of NTO; for example, the Space Shuttle reaction control system used MON3 (NTO containing 3% NO by weight).

=== The Apollo-Soyuz mishap ===
On 24 July 1975, NTO poisoning affected three U.S. astronauts on the final descent to Earth after the Apollo–Soyuz Test Project flight. This was due to a switch accidentally left in the wrong position, which allowed the attitude control thrusters to fire after the cabin fresh air intake was opened, allowing NTO fumes to enter the cabin. One crew member lost consciousness during descent. Upon landing, the crew was hospitalized for five days for chemical-induced pneumonia and pulmonary edema.

== Power generation using N_{2}O_{4} ==
1958 NASA hypergolic propellant experiment displaying combination effects of NTO reaction with hydrazine

The tendency of N_{2}O_{4} to reversibly break into NO_{2} has led to research into its use in advanced power-generation systems as a dissociating gas. "Cool" dinitrogen tetroxide is compressed and heated, causing it to dissociate into nitrogen dioxide at half the molecular weight. This hot nitrogen dioxide is expanded through a turbine, cooling it and lowering the pressure, and then cooled further in a heat sink, causing it to recombine into nitrogen tetroxide at the original molecular weight. It is then much easier to compress to start the entire cycle again. Such dissociative-gas Brayton cycles have the potential to considerably increase efficiencies of power-conversion equipment.

The high molecular weight and smaller volumetric expansion ratio of nitrogen dioxide compared to steam allows the turbines to be more compact.

N_{2}O_{4} was the main component of the "nitrin" working fluid in the decommissioned Pamir-630D portable nuclear reactor, which operated from 1985 to 1987.

== Chemical reactions ==
=== Intermediate in the manufacture of nitric acid ===
Orange-brown smoke hue, typical of present airborne NTO

Nitric acid is manufactured on a large scale via N_{2}O_{4}. This species reacts with water to give both nitrous acid and nitric acid:

N_{2}O_{4} + H_{2}O → HNO_{2} + HNO_{3}

The coproduct HNO_{2} upon heating disproportionates to NO and more nitric acid. When exposed to oxygen, NO is converted back into nitrogen dioxide:

2 NO + O_{2} → 2 NO_{2}

The resulting NO_{2} and N_{2}O_{4} can be returned to the cycle to give the mixture of nitrous and nitric acids again.

=== Synthesis of metal nitrates ===
N_{2}O_{4} undergoes molecular autoionization to give [NO^{+}][NO^{−}_{3}], with the former nitrosonium ion being a strong oxidant. Various anhydrous transition metal nitrate complexes can be prepared from N_{2}O_{4} and base metal.

2 N_{2}O_{4} + M → 2 NO + M(NO_{3})_{2},

where M = Cu, Zn, or Sn.

If metal nitrates are prepared from N_{2}O_{4} in completely anhydrous conditions, a range of covalent metal nitrates can be formed with many transition metals. This is because there is a thermodynamic preference for the nitrate ion to bond covalently with such metals rather than form an ionic structure. Such compounds must be prepared in anhydrous conditions, since the nitrate ion is a much weaker ligand than water, and if water is present, then the simple nitrate of the hydrated metal ion will form. The anhydrous nitrates concerned are themselves covalent, and many, such as anhydrous copper nitrate, are volatile at room temperature. Anhydrous titanium nitrate sublimes in vacuum at only 40 °C. Many of the anhydrous transition metal nitrates have striking colours. This branch of chemistry was developed by Cliff Addison and Norman Logan at the University of Nottingham in the UK during the 1960s and 1970s, when highly-efficient desiccants and dry boxes started to become available.

=== With organic compounds ===
In even slightly basic solvents, N_{2}O_{4} adds to alkenes radically, giving mixtures of nitro compounds and nitrite esters. Pure or in entirely nonbasic solvents, the compounds autoionizes as above, to give nitroso compounds and nitrate esters.
