= Unsymmetrical dimethylhydrazine =

Rocket fuel

Skeletal formula of unsymmetrical dimethylhydrazine with some implicit hydrogens shown
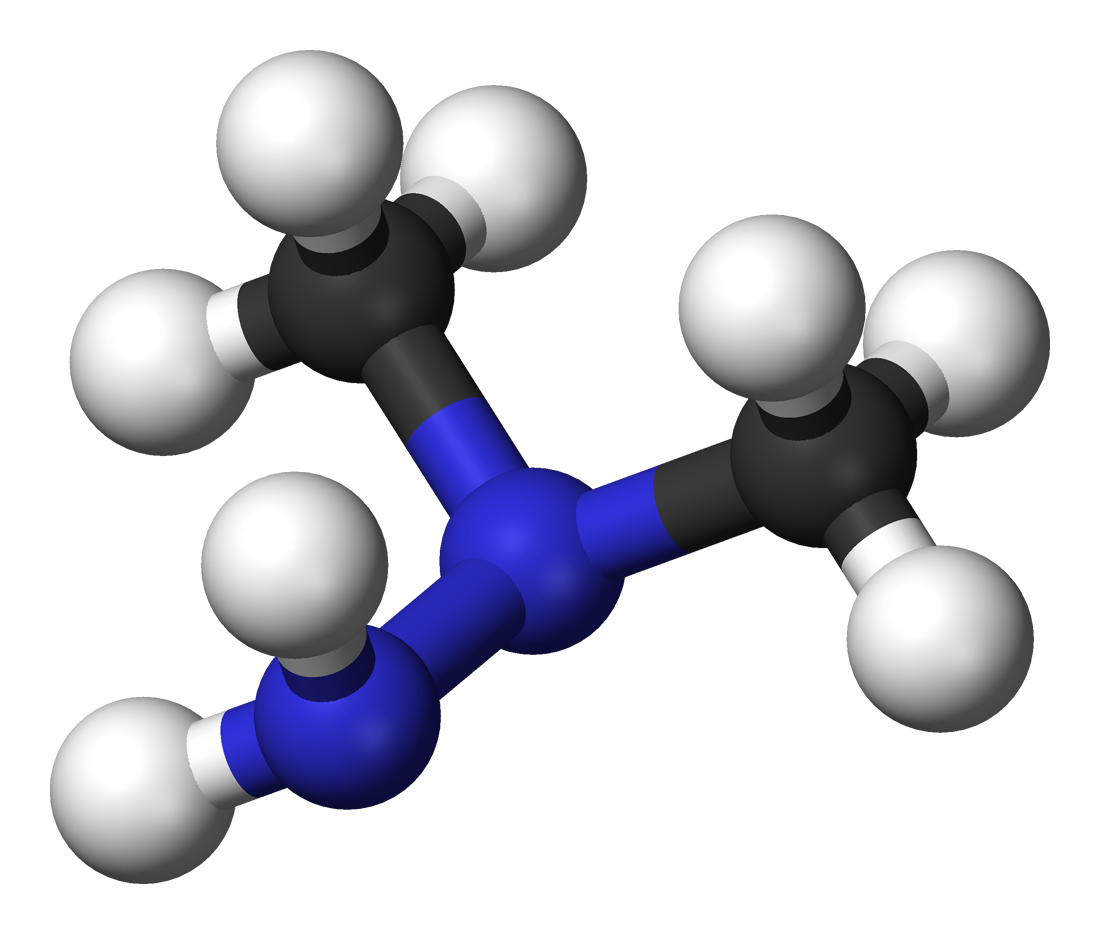
Ball and stick model of unsymmetrical dimethylhydrazine

Names
- Preferred IUPAC name 1,1-Dimethylhydrazine
- Other names: Dimazine; 1,1-Dimethyldiazane

Identifiers
CAS Number	57-14-7
3D model (JSmol)	Interactive image
Beilstein Reference	605261
ChEBI	CHEBI:18853
ChemSpider	5756
ECHA InfoCard	100.000.287
EC Number	200-316-0
KEGG	C19233
MeSH	dimazine
PubChem CID	5976
RTECS number	MV2450000
UNII	4WPQ90N53J
UN number	1163
CompTox Dashboard (EPA)	DTXSID1020516
- InChI: InChI=1S/C2H8N2/c1-4(2)3/h3H2,1-2H3 Key: RHUYHJGZWVXEHW-UHFFFAOYSA-N
- SMILES: CN(C)N

Properties
Chemical formula	H_{2}NN(CH_{3})_{2}
Appearance	Colorless liquid
Odor	Ammoniacal, fishy
Density	791 kg m^{−3} (at 22 °C)
Melting point	−57 °C; −71 °F; 216 K
Boiling point	64.0 °C; 147.1 °F; 337.1 K
Solubility in water	Miscible
Vapor pressure	13.7 kPa (at 20 °C)
Refractive index (n_{D})	1.4075

Thermochemistry
Heat capacity (C)	164.05 J K^{−1} mol^{−1}
Std molar entropy (S^{⦵}_{298})	200.25 J K^{−1} mol^{−1}
Std enthalpy of formation (Δ_{f}H^{⦵}_{298})	48.3 kJ mol^{−1}
Std enthalpy of combustion (Δ_{c}H^{⦵}_{298})	−1982.3 – −1975.1 kJ mol^{−1}

Hazards
- Occupational safety and health (OHS/OSH)
Main hazards	Carcinogen, spontaneously ignites on contact with oxidizers
- GHS labelling
Pictograms	(GHS02: Flammable) (GHS05: Corrosive) (GHS06: Toxic) (GHS08: Health hazard) (GHS09: Environmental hazard)
Signal word	Danger
Hazard statements	H225, H301, H314, H331, H350, H411
Precautionary statements	P210, P261, P273, P280, P301+P310
NFPA 704 (fire diamond)	4 3 1
Flash point	−10 °C (14 °F; 263 K)
Autoignition temperature	248 °C (478 °F; 521 K)
Explosive limits	2–95%
- Lethal dose or concentration (LD, LC)
LD_{50} (median dose)	122 mg kg^{−1} (oral, rat); 1.06 g kg^{−1} (dermal, rabbit)
LC_{50} (median concentration)	252 ppm (rat, 4 hr); 172 ppm (mouse, 4 hr); 392 ppm (hamster, 4 hr); 3580 ppm (dog, 15 min); 1410 ppm (rat, 1 hr); 981 ppm (dog, 1 hr)
- NIOSH (US health exposure limits)
PEL (Permissible)	TWA 0.5 ppm (1 mg/m^{3}) [skin]
REL (Recommended)	Ca C 0.06 ppm (0.15 mg/m^{3}) [2 hr]
IDLH (Immediate danger)	Ca [15 ppm]

Related compounds
Related compounds	Dimethylamine; Hydrazine; Symmetrical dimethylhydrazine
- Except where otherwise noted, data are given for materials in their standard state (at 25 °C [77 °F], 100 kPa). verify (what is ?) Infobox references

Unsymmetrical dimethylhydrazine (abbreviated as UDMH; also known as 1,1-dimethylhydrazine, heptyl or Geptil) is a chemical compound with the formula H_{2}NN(CH_{3})_{2} that is primarily used as a rocket fuel. At room temperature, UDMH is a colorless liquid, with a sharp, fishy, ammonia-like smell typical of organic amines. Samples turn yellowish on exposure to air and absorb oxygen and carbon dioxide. It is miscible with water, ethanol, and kerosene. At concentrations between 2.5% and 95% in air, its vapors are flammable. It is not sensitive to shock.

Symmetrical dimethylhydrazine (1,2-dimethylhydrazine) also exists, but it is not as useful. UDMH can be oxidized in air to form many different substances, including toxic ones.

== Synthesis ==
In 1875, UDMH was first prepared by Emil Fischer, who discovered and named the class of hydrazines, by reducing N-Nitrosodimethylamine with zinc in boiling acetic acid. Fischer's student Edward Renouf later studied UDMH more extensively as part of his doctoral dissertation. Other historical lab routes include methylation of hydrazine, reduction of nitrodimethylamine (more commonly known as dimethylnitramine) and amination of dimethylamine with aminopersulfuric acid (more commonly known as hydroxylamine‑O‑sulfonic acid).

UDMH is produced industrially by two routes. Based on the Olin Raschig process, one method involves reaction of monochloramine with dimethylamine giving 1,1-dimethylhydrazinium chloride:

(CH_{3})_{2}NH + NH_{2}Cl → (CH_{3})_{2}NNH_{2} ⋅ HCl

In the presence of suitable catalysts, acetylhydrazine can be N-dimethylated using formaldehyde and hydrogen to give the N,N-dimethyl-N'-acetylhydrazine, which can subsequently be hydrolyzed:

CH_{3}C(O)NHNH_{2} + 2CH_{2}O + 2H_{2} → CH_{3}C(O)NHN(CH_{3})_{2} + 2H_{2}O
CH_{3}C(O)NHN(CH_{3})_{2} + H_{2}O → CH_{3}COOH + H_{2}NN(CH_{3})_{2}

== Uses ==
UDMH is often used in hypergolic rocket fuels as a bipropellant in combination with the oxidizer nitrogen tetroxide and less frequently with IRFNA (inhibited red fuming nitric acid) or liquid oxygen. UDMH is a derivative of hydrazine and is sometimes referred to as a hydrazine. As a fuel, it is described in specification MIL-PRF-25604 in the United States.

UDMH is stable and can be kept loaded in rocket fuel systems for long periods, which makes it appealing for use in many liquid rocket engines, despite its cost. In some applications, such as the OMS in the Space Shuttle or maneuvering engines, monomethylhydrazine is used instead due to its slightly higher specific impulse. In some kerosene-fueled rockets, UDMH functions as a starter fuel to start combustion and warm the rocket engine prior to switching to kerosene.

UDMH has higher stability than hydrazine, especially at elevated temperatures, and can be used as its replacement or together in a mixture. UDMH is used in many European, Russian, Indian, and Chinese rocket designs. The Russian SS-11 Sego (aka 8K84) ICBM, SS-19 Stiletto (aka 15A30) ICBM, Proton, Kosmos-3M, R-29RMU2 Layner, R-36M, Rokot (based on 15A30) and the Chinese Long March 2 are the most notable users of UDMH (which is referred to as "heptyl" (codename from Soviet era) by Russian engineers). The Titan, GSLV, and Delta rocket families use a mixture of 50% hydrazine and 50% UDMH, called Aerozine 50, in different stages. There is speculation that it is the fuel used in the ballistic missiles that North Korea has developed and tested in 2017.

== Safety ==
Hydrazine and its methyl derivatives are toxic but LD50 values have not been reported. It is a precursor (via oxidation) to dimethylnitrosamine, which is carcinogenic. According to scientific data, usage of UDMH in rockets at Baikonur Cosmodrome has had adverse effects on the environment. One such instance was the Nedelin catastrophe in 1960 when UDMH and dinitrogen tetroxide leaked from a rocket after an explosion and killed a number of bystanders through burn injuries and its toxicity.

== See also ==
- Aerozine 50
- C-Stoff
- Devil's venom
- UH 25
