= German influence on Soviet rocketry =

German influence on the Soviet rocketry after WWII

During World War II, Nazi Germany developed rocket technology that was more advanced than that of the Allies and a race commenced between the Soviet Union and the United States to capture and exploit the technology. Soviet rocket specialists were sent to Germany in 1945 to obtain V-2 rockets and worked with German specialists in Germany and later in the Soviet Union to understand and replicate the rocket technology. The involvement of German scientists and engineers was an essential catalyst to early Soviet efforts. In 1945 and 1946 the use of German expertise was invaluable in reducing the time needed to master the intricacies of the V-2 rocket, establishing production of the R-1 rocket and enabling a base for further developments. However, after 1947 the Soviets made very little use of German specialists and their influence on future Soviet rocketry was marginal.

== Background ==
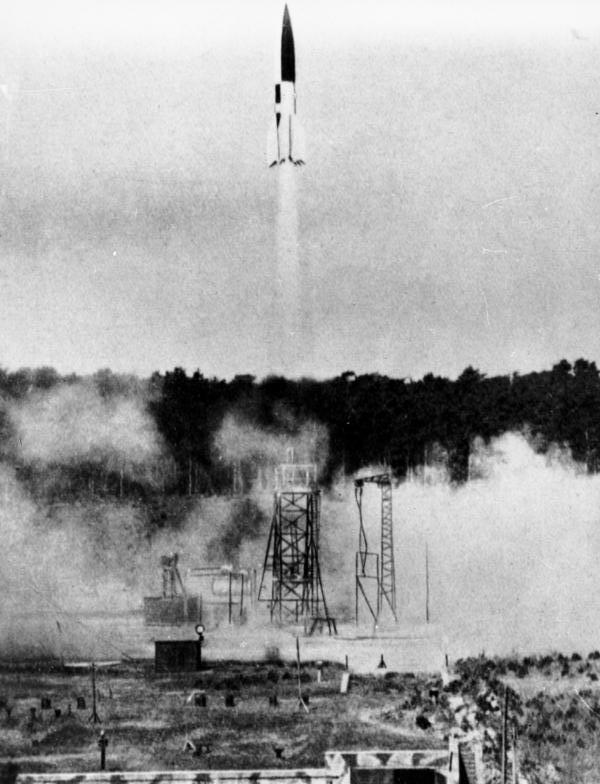
V-2 rocket launching, Peenemünde, on the north-east Baltic German coast (1943)

During WWII Nazi Germany developed the world's first long range Liquid-propellant rockets known as the V-2, with the technical name A4. The missile was developed as a "vengeance weapon" and assigned to attack Allied cities as retaliation for the Allied bombings against German cities. The V-2 rocket also became the first artificial object to travel into space by crossing the Kármán line with the vertical launch of MW 18014 to a vertex of 174.6 km on 20 June 1944.

The V-2 rocket was far more advanced than any rocket developed by the Allies. Prior to 1945 the United Kingdom, United States and Soviet Union had not developed a rocket with a thrust greater than 1.5 metric tons, whilst the V-2's thrust was up to 27 metric tons. A race commenced between the Allies, particularly United States and Soviets, to acquire the technology behind the V-2 and similar weapons developed by Nazi Germany.

At the end of WWII the Soviet Union had been devastated by Nazi Germany, with 27 million people killed, 1,700 cities destroyed and agriculture production reduced to famine proportions. At the Yalta Conference Winston Churchill, Franklin D. Roosevelt, and Joseph Stalin agreed that war reparations were payable by Nazi Germany in the form of equipment, goods and German labour, with Roosevelt and Stalin agreeing to an amount of $20 Billion, with 50% ($10 Billion) going to the Soviet Union. The Soviets, United States and to a lesser extent British and French all seized "intellectual" repatriations from Germany. The dismantling of German industry also ensured the complete disarmament of its war potential, as agreed at the Potsdam Conference.

== Soviet rocket development prior to 1945 ==
Rocketry in the Soviet Union began in 1921 with extensive work at the Gas Dynamics Laboratory (GDL), which was merged with the Group for the Study of Reactive Motion (GIRD), led by Sergey Korolev, in 1933 to form the Reactive Scientific Research Institute (RNII). This well-funded and staffed laboratory created the Katyusha rocket launcher and built over 100 experimental rocket engines under the direction of Valentin Glushko. Design work included regenerative cooling, hypergolic propellant ignition, and swirling and bi-propellant mixing fuel injectors. During the early 1930s Soviet rocket technology was comparable to Germany's, but Joseph Stalin's Great Purge severely damaged its progress, with Korolev, Glushko and many other leading engineers imprisoned in the Gulag.

The Soviet Union was first informed of the Nazi Germany's rocket programme in July 1944 by Winston Churchill, who appealed directly to Stalin to inspect a missile test station in Debica, Poland which was about to be overrun by advancing Soviet forces. British and Soviet personnel inspected the site and recovered A4 missile parts, which were sent to London via Moscow. Whilst in Moscow the parts were inspected by several members of the Soviet rocket design bureau RNII.

== Work in Eastern Germany ==
=== Institut Rabe and Institut Nordhausen ===
In early 1945 a team of Soviet rocket specialists were sent to Germany to identify and recover German rocket technology. The first Soviet team to arrive at Nordhausen, the main V-2 construction site, were disappointed, United States teams had already removed approximately 100 completed V-2 missiles and destroyed what remained. In addition, more than 500 leading German rocket engineers had surrendered to the United States, including 15 tons of documents relating to rocket technology.

Soviet search teams did locate V-2 parts at the Mittelwerk underground rocket factory near Nordhausen, at Lehesten (test site for rocket engines) and other locations in the Thuringia area. Therefore, a Soviet missile research group based in Bleicherode was created in July 1945 led by Boris Chertok and called Institut RABE that recruited and employed German rocket specialists to work with Soviet engineers for restoring a working V-2 rocket flight control system. The Institut RABE was also created with the purpose of retrieving German rocket specialists from the United States Occupation zone. As an early success in August 1945 Chertok recruited Helmut Gröttrup (the deputy for the electrical system and missile control at Peenemünde, also assistant to Ernst Steinhoff) from American territory, along with his family, and offered him founding the Büro Gröttrup in parallel to the Institut RABE.

In February 1946 the Institute RABE and Büro Gröttrup were absorbed into the larger Institut Nordhausen, which had the goal of recreating the entire German A4 rocket technology. It was headed by Korolev as the Chief Engineer and Gröttrup as the German head. In May 1946, the Institute Nordhausen, Institute Berlin (reconstructing the Wasserfall missile) and several manufacturing sites in Thuringia (until 1945 part of the Mittelwerk supply) were combined into the Zentralwerke. By October 1946, Zentralwerke employed 733 Soviet specialists, and between 5,000 and 7,000 Germans headed by Gröttrup as General Director, supervised by Korolev as Soviet Chief Engineer and Glushko as head of Engine assembly and propulsion systems .

=== Operation Osoaviakhim ===
On 13 May 1946 USSR Council of Ministers Decree No 1017-419 'Questions on Reactive Armaments' was signed by Stalin, which established the future strategy and direction for Soviet rocketry. Among the detailed requirements was that work in Germany would end in late 1946 with Soviet and German personnel transferred to Soviet locations. Therefore, the most capable German rocket scientists and engineers were identified, and on 22 October 1946 302 of them having knowledge in rocketry, thereof 198 from the Zentralwerke (a total of 495 persons including family members), were deported to the Soviet Union as part of Operation Osoaviakhim. In total, 2,552 German specialists together with 4,008 family members were relocated to the USSR.

== Work in the USSR ==
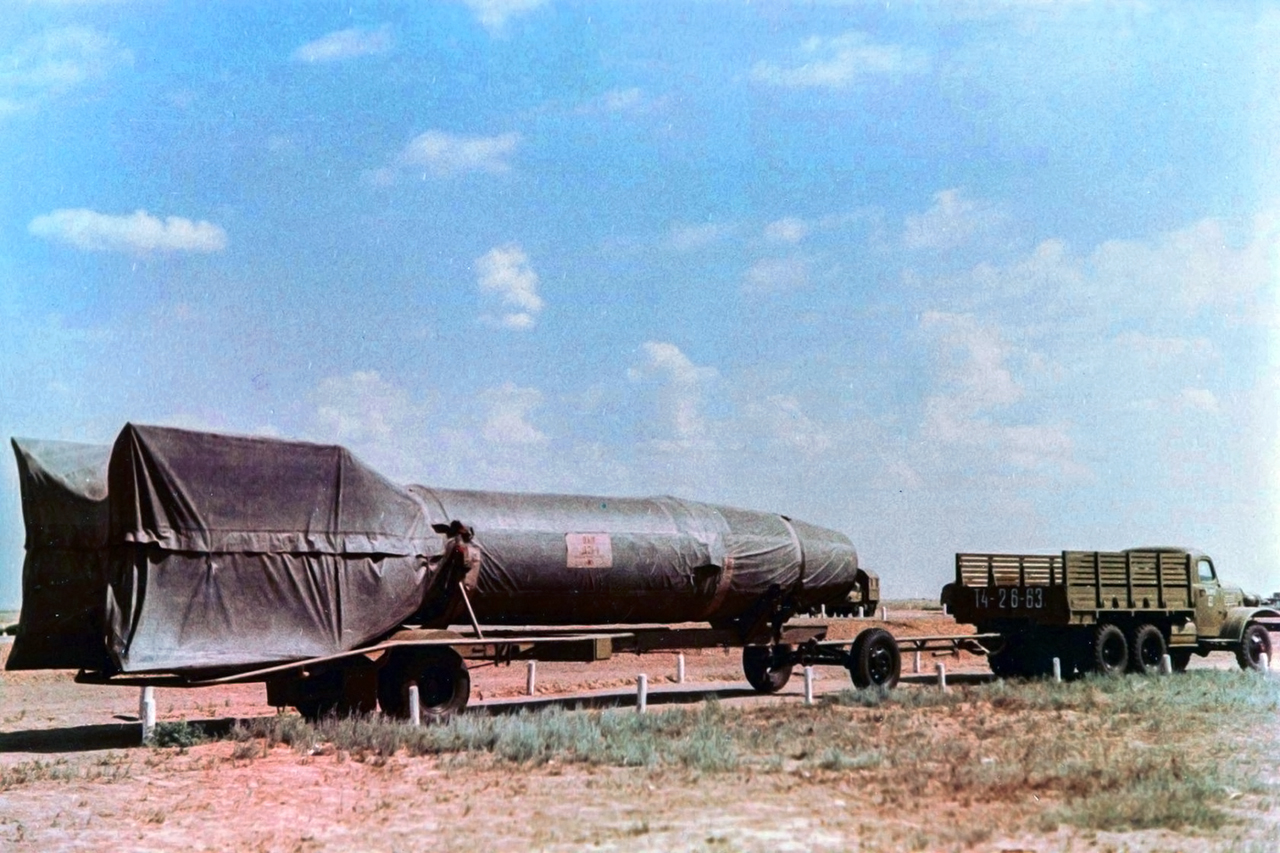
Soviet R-1 on Vidal carrier (1948)

On arrival the 302 Germans were split into several groups. A large group of 99 specialists from the Zentralwerke was installed in Podlipki in the north east section of Moscow as part of Korolev's NII-88, 76 design engineers were transferred to Gorodomlya Island, and 23 specialists to Khimki, 18 km northwest of Moscow, as part of Glushko's OKB-456 for the development of rocket engines. The initial work included:

- "consultations for issuing a set of A4 rocket documentation in Russian,
- compiling diagrams of the A4 and surface-to-air guided missile research laboratories,
- studying issues related to boosting the A4 rocket engine,
- developing the design for an engine with a thrust of 100 tons, and
- preparing to assemble rockets that were made of German parts and had been outfitted with equipment at the Institute Nordhausen."

The ministry for production of telecommunications assigned another group of 43 German scientists to assist NII-885 under the Chief Designer of autonomous control systems Nikolay Pilyugin for developing gyroscopic guidance systems.

While located in the Soviet Union the German specialists received fairly high wages and good conditions, which were mainly based on their qualifications. For example, Gröttrup was initially paid 7,000 rubles per month and his family were housed in a six-room villa and provided with a chauffeured vehicle. The average wage received for a German graduate engineer was 4,000 rubles per month, plus all Germans were entitled to performance bonuses. As a comparison, Chertok, the former head of Institute Rabe and now Deputy Chief Engineer and Head of department for guidance systems, who also now supervised the German specialists working on control systems, received a salary of 3,000 rubles per month and his family lived in two rooms of a communal four-room apartment.

Drawing of the Soviet R-1 missile, NATO code SS-1 Scunner

The first Soviet tests of V-2 rockets took place in October 1947 at Kapustin Yar. 13 German engineers participated in the tests, among them Helmut Gröttrup, Johannes Hoch, Kurt Magnus, Fritz Viebach, Hans Vilter, Waldemar Wolff. The first two rockets were successfully launched and flew for approximately 200 km, however they deviated 30 km and 180 km from their intended target. The German specialists Magnus and Hoch were instrumental in resolving the issue, which was an unknown problem with the V-2 rockets recovered from Germany. For resolving the issue all the 13 German specialists were each rewarded with a 15,000 ruble bonus.

In June 1947 the German team in NII-88, led by Gröttrup, proposed the development of an improved version of the V-2, which he called the G-1 ("Gerät 1", gadget 1) (called the R-10 in Soviet terms). This plan, whilst supported by the Soviet minister of armaments Dmitry Ustinov and senior Soviet management, was opposed by Soviet engineers, particularly by Korolev, who was now Chief Designer of long-range ballistic missiles. Korolev had simultaneously and independently commenced work on the Soviet copy of the V-2, designated as R-1, and an improved R-2 for doubled shooting range. Some Soviet engineers of NII-88 were deputized to support the Germans in calculations for G-1 which delayed Korolev's progress and raised his opposition.

Glushko, who was now Chief Designer of liquid-propellant rocket engines in OKB-456, used German expertise for mastering and improving the existing V-2 engine, internally called RD-100 (copy of V-2) and RD-101 (used for R-1) with a thrust of up to 267 kN. Further German ideas for increased thrust helped Glusko to develop RD-103 for the R-5 Pobeda with a thrust of 432 kN (44 tons) and higher efficiency. However once this was accomplished Glushko no longer needed their expertise. By September 1950, the 23 strong German team in OKB-456 was sent back to Germany.

Due to political and security concerns, German specialists were not allowed direct knowledge or access to any Soviet missile design. Therefore, once the Soviets had mastered understanding and production of the V-2 rocket in 1946–47, all German specialists were excluded from Soviet developments. Their work was conducted independently, including work on the G-1, which proceeded as a "draft plan".

Until early 1948 all German specialists working in Podlipki were transferred to Gorodomlya Island. In September 1948 test flights were carried on the R-1, the Soviet copy of the V-2 rocket, built with local materials. No German personnel were present for these tests at Kapustin Yar.

In December 1948 the updated plan for the G-1 rocket, which the German team had improved the range and accuracy, was reviewed and acknowledged with a bonus. However major work on the G-1 was terminated by senior Soviet management. After then a study for the G-2 for a payload of 1,000 kg at a range of 2,500 km was carried out by the German specialists. On April 9, 1949, Ustinov arrived in Gorodomlya on a visit with a new urgent task to design a rocket capable of carrying a payload of 3,000 kg over a distance of 3,000 kilometers. These missiles received the indexes G-4 (R-14) and G-5 (R-15). In October 1949 Korolev and Ustinov visited Gorodomlya for reviewing the progress of work and understanding German knowledge as much as possible to push the development of mid-range R-3 and R-5 Pobeda missiles. By December 1949, the two projects had been significantly improved: a single-stage ballistic missile (G-4/R-14) and a glider equipped with a rocket booster and a jet engine (G-5/R-15). The concept of the G-4 showed a number of changes as compared to the V-2 and thus differed fundamentally from the rockets previously manufactured. The newly chosen shape of a circular cone was intended to ensure increased aerodynamic stability so that the stabilization surfaces at the rear could be dispensed with. The position control was carried out by a swiveling engine. At the same time, the German designers paid attention to radical simplification of the overall system and consistent weight savings in order to achieve the required reliability and range. The US historian Walter A. McDougall called it the most-advanced rocket design at that time.

The later studies from 1950 were limited to initial designs, including diagrams and calculations. None of these studies were officially taken up by the Soviets. From early 1951 young Soviet engineers were sent to Gorodomlya Island for training purposes. By this time most of the German specialists were spending their time playing sports, gardening or reading.

=== Return to Germany ===
By August 1950 the Soviet government had decided to send the Germans working for NII-88 home, which occurred in three waves in December 1951, June 1952 (with the majority) and the last group of twenty, including Gröttrup, left in November 1953. By the end of 1950 a small number of Germans (among them Johannes Hoch) were transferred to Moscow and worked on activities for guidance control of surface-to-air missiles.

== Historical analysis ==
Historians have disagreed on the extent that Nazi Germany played with developing the Soviet rocket program. Chertok, who participated in the events and documented the details in his four volume Rockets and People said that the Germans had little influence and the R-7 rocket that propelled the Sputnik 1 to orbit was "free of the "birthmarks" of German rocket technology". This view is supported by German born historian of rocketry Willey Ley, who wrote "In reality, the Germans did not build anything for the Russians, did not 'supervise' the firings, and did not 'introduce innovations'".

Other historians, particularly German based, have claimed that German specialists had an extensive influence on Soviet rocketry. In particular Olaf Przybilski has pointed out similarities between later Soviet rockets and the studies carried out by German specialists, however these claims lack convincing evidence.

Space historian Asif Siddiqi, whose book Challenge to Apollo: the Soviet Union and the space race, 1945–1974 was rated by The Wall Street Journal as one of the best works on space exploration, takes a more balanced approach by acknowledging Nazi Germany rocket technology and involvement of German scientists and engineers was an essential catalyst to early Soviet efforts. In 1945 and 1946 the use of German expertise was invaluable in reducing the time needed to master the intricacies of the V-2, establishing production of the R-1 rocket and enabling a base for further developments. However, due to a combination of reasons, including secrecy requirements due to the military nature of the work, political considerations and personal reasons from some key players, from 1947 the Soviets made very little use of German specialists. They were effectively frozen out from ongoing research and their influence on future Soviet rocketry was marginal. Siddiqi also noted a CIA report, which summed up the total German contribution as follows:

"The German scientists made a very valuable contribution to the Soviet missile program[;] however, it cannot be said that without the Germans the Soviet Union would have had no significant missile program... There is no doubt that it took the German war time success with guided missiles to cause Stalin and his colleagues to devote large scale support to the Soviet effort in this field. Once this support was forthcoming the use of German scientists permitted the Soviets to achieve results in a much shorter time than it would have taken them along but there is no reason to believe that the Soviets could not have eventually done the job by themselves".

== See also ==
- Soviet rocketry
- Operation Paperclip
