= Institute Rabe =

Soviet / German rocket research group

Institute Rabe (Russian: Институт «Рабе», romanized: Institut "Rabe", from German: Raketenbau und Entwicklung, 'rocket building and design') was a Soviet institute created with the purpose of recruiting German rocket specialists to aid in current and future Soviet rocket development.

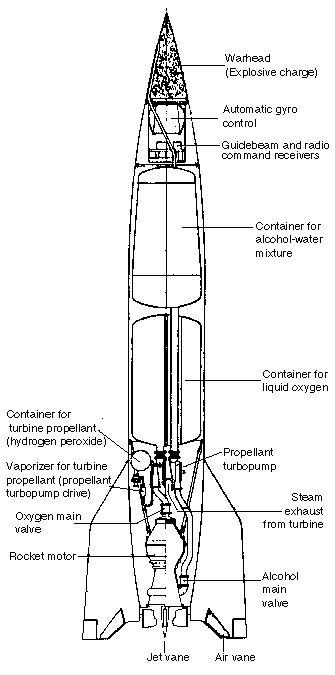
Diagram of a V-2 rocket

== Overview ==
It was created in July 1945 in Bleicherode when the Red Army took over Thuringia as part of the Soviet occupation zone. Originally, the institute consisted of 12 Germans under Major Boris Chertok and Lieutenant Colonel Aleksey Mikhaylovich Isayev, who were enlisted to recreate the A-4 flight control system. This mission had to be kept secret, as the American-occupied territory of Hesse and Bavaria was not far away from Lehesten, the testing site for rocket engines.

By the end of August 1945, the institute had settled into their headquarters (the former mansion of Wernher von Braun) but it lacked deeper knowledge of the Peenemünde developments because the US Army had seized a group of 450 specialists in Garmisch-Partenkirchen, among them von Braun's core group, and forced other specialists from Thuringia to the US Occupation Zone as part of the Operation Overcast. In August 1945, Chertok successfully completed his most important covert operation when he retrieved Helmut Gröttrup (the deputy for the electrical system and missile control) from American territory along with his family to set up a parallel Büro Gröttrup in Bleicherode. In February 1946 both the Institut RABE and the Büro Gröttrup were merged into the larger Institut Nordhausen, which had the goal of recreating the entire German A-4 rocket. This institute was headed by Sergei Korolev as the Soviet chief engineer and Helmut Gröttrup as the German director under Soviet military control. In May 1946, the Zentralwerke combined the Institut Nordhausen, Institut Berlin (recreating the Wasserfall anti-aircraft missile) and manufacturing sites of the earlier Mittelwerk in Thuringia.

In October 1946, during Operation Osoaviakhim, many sites for the development of weapons and aircraft in East Germany were closed and more than 2,300 German specialists were forcibly relocated for employment in the Soviet Union, among them about 200 specialists from Zentralwerke (500 people including their families). They were moved to Podlipki (about 120 engineers) and Gorodomlya Island (about 40 engineers) as part of Korolev's NII-88 and later Soviet design bureau OKB-1, and to Khimki as part of Valentin Glushko's OKB-456 for developing rocket engines.

== See also ==
- German influence on the Soviet space program
