= Sergei Korolev =

Soviet aerospace engineer (1907–1966)

- Сергей Королёв; Сергій Корольов
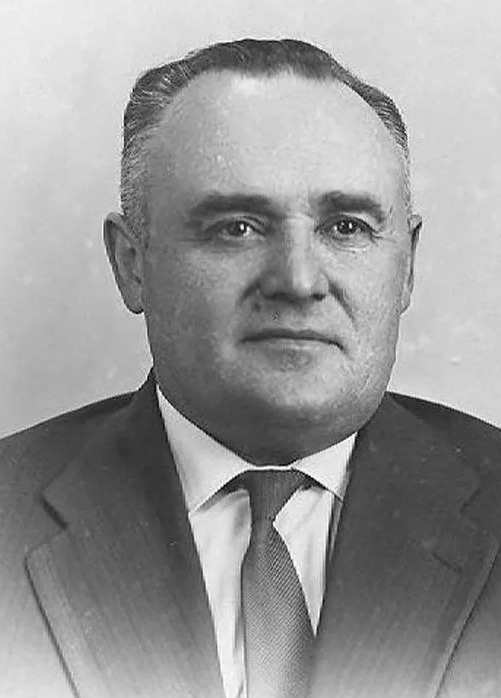
- Born: 12 January 1907; Zhitomir, Russian Empire
- Died: 14 January 1966 (aged 59); Moscow, Soviet Union
- Resting place: Kremlin Wall Necropolis
- Education: Kiev Polytechnic Institute; Bauman Moscow State Technical University
- Occupations: Rocket engineer, lead designer of the Soviet space program
- Spouse(s): Ksenia Vincentini; Nina Ivanovna Kotenkova
- Children: 1
- Military career
- Allegiance: Soviet Union
- Branch: Soviet Ground Forces
- Service years: 1945–1952
- Rank: Colonel

Sergei Pavlovich Korolev (Note: In this name that follows East Slavic naming customs, the patronymic is Pavlovich and the family name is Korolev. Korolev is the transliteration used by the Library of Congress and adopted by James Harford for his biography.) (Note: Russian: Сергей Павлович Королёв, romanized: Sergey Pavlovich Korolyov, IPA: [sʲɪrˈɡʲej ˈpavləvʲɪtɕ kərɐˈlʲɵf]; Ukrainian: Сергій Павлович Корольов, romanized: Serhii Pavlovych Koroliov, IPA: [serˈɦij ˈpɑu̯lowɪtʃ koroˈlʲɔu̯].) (12 January 1907 [O.S. 30 December 1906] – 14 January 1966) was a Soviet rocket engineer and spacecraft designer who led the development of the Soviet space program during the early years of the Space Race.

Korolev directed development of the R-7 rocket, the world's first intercontinental ballistic missile (ICBM) and was a leader in the Soviet space programme which used modified versions of the R-7 for several notable achievements. Under his leadership, the Soviet Union launched Sputnik 1, the first artificial satellite; Laika, the first animal to orbit Earth; Luna 2, the first human-made object to reach another celestial body; and Belka and Strelka, the first animals to survive orbital spaceflight. He also directed the missions that carried Yuri Gagarin into space aboard Vostok 1, making him the first human in space, and enabled Alexei Leonov's spacewalk during Voskhod 2, the first extravehicular activity by a human.

Originally trained as an aircraft designer, Korolev became a leading figure in Soviet rocketry. In 1938 he was arrested during the Great Purge on charges later shown to be false and spent nearly six years in prison and labour camps, including several months in Kolyma. Prior to his imprisonment, Korolev had been initially condemned to be executed under Joseph Stalin's orders among 74 military specialists and engineers before his sentence was commuted to hard prison labour. After his release, he returned to engineering work and became a central figure in the Soviet ICBM and space programmes. His death in 1966 ended his direct involvement in Soviet efforts to land a crew on the Moon before the United States.

During his lifetime, Korolev was publicly identified only as glavny konstruktor (главный конструктор; lit. 'chief designer'), partly to protect him from possible assassination attempts during the Cold War. Even some cosmonauts who worked with him did not know his name. His identity was publicly disclosed only after his death in 1966, when his role in the Soviet Union's space achievements became widely known.

== Early life ==
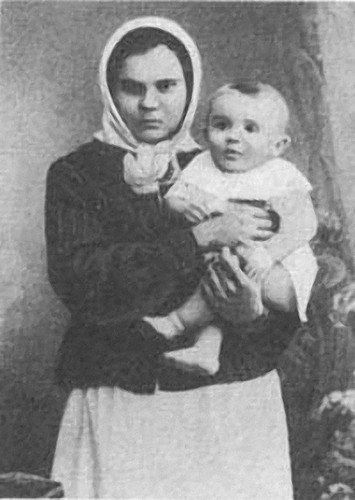
Korolev with his nanny Varvara Marchenko in 1907

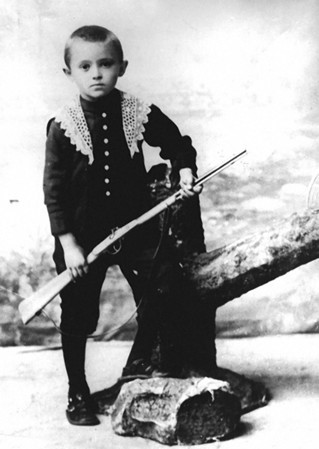
Korolev in 1912

Korolev was born in the city of Zhitomir, the capital of the Volhynian Governorate of the Russian Empire (now in Ukraine). His father, Pavel Yakovlevich Korolev, was born in Mogilev to a Russian soldier and a Belarusian mother.

His mother, Maria Nikolaevna Koroleva (Moskalenko/Bulanina), was a daughter of a wealthy merchant from the city of Nizhyn, with Zaporozhian Cossack, Greek and Polish heritage.

His father moved to Zhitomir to be a teacher of the Russian language. Three years after Sergei's birth the couple separated due to financial difficulties. Although Pavel later wrote to Maria requesting a meeting with his son, Sergei was told by his mother that his father had allegedly died. Sergei never saw his father after the family break-up, and Pavel died in 1929 before his son learned the truth.

Korolev grew up in Nizhyn, under the care of his maternal grandparents, Nikolay Yakovlevich Moskalenko, who was a trader of the Second Guild, and Maria Matveevna Moskalenko (née Fursa), a daughter of a local cossack. Korolev's mother also had a sister Anna and two brothers Yuri and Vasily. Maria Koroleva was frequently away attending Women's higher education courses in Kiev, so Sergei was often by himself and grew up a lonely child with few friends. In 1914 World War I commenced with social unrest in the Kiev area. No one had time for the seven year old Korolev during this period and he was noted as being stubborn, persistent, and argumentative. Korolev began reading at an early age from his grandfather's newspapers, and his pre-school teacher noted he had an excellent memory with abilities in mathematics, reading and writing. His mother divorced Pavel in 1915 and in 1916 married Grigory Mikhailovich Balanin, an electrical engineer who had been educated in Germany but who had to attend the Kiev Polytechnic University because German engineering diplomas were not recognized in Russia. Grigory was an excellent step-father, positively influencing Korolev's manners and study habits. After getting a job with the regional railway, Grigory moved the family to Odessa in 1917, where they endured hardships with many other families through the tumultuous years following the Russian Revolution and the internecine struggles that continued until the Bolsheviks assumed unchallenged power in 1920. Local schools were closed and young Korolev had to continue his studies at home, where he suffered from a bout of typhus during the severe food shortages of 1919.

== Education ==
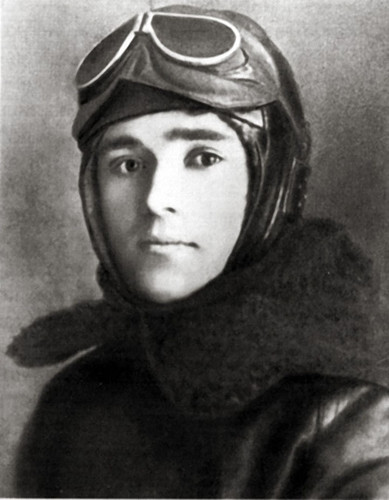
Korolev in 1925

Korolev received vocational training in carpentry and academics at the Odessa Building Trades School (Stroyprofshkola No. 1). Enjoyment of a 1913 air show inspired interest in aeronautical engineering. He made an independent study of flight theory, and worked at the local glider club. A detachment of military seaplanes had been stationed in Odessa, and Korolev took a keen interest in their operations.

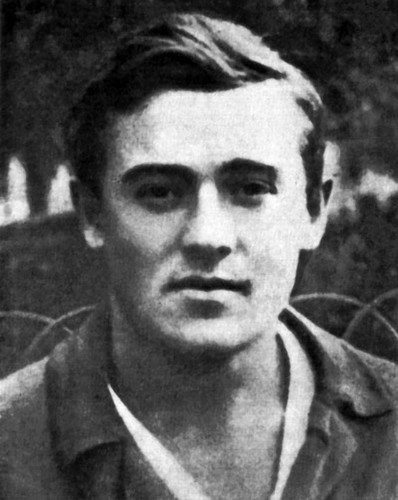
Korolev in 1927

In 1923 he joined the Society of Aviation and Aerial Navigation of Ukraine and the Crimea (OAVUK). He had his first flying lesson after joining the Odessa hydroplane squadron and had many opportunities to fly as a passenger. In 1924 he designed an OAVUK construction project glider called the K-5 when he was 17 years old. He briefly trained in gymnastics until his academic work suffered. Korolev hoped to attend the Zhukovsky Academy in Moscow, but he did not meet the academy's standards. He attended the Kiev Polytechnic Institute's aviation branch in 1924 while living with his uncle Yuri, and earned money for his courses by doing odd jobs. His curriculum included engineering, physics and mathematics classes. He met and became attracted to a classmate, Xenia Vincentini, who would later become his first wife. In 1925 he was accepted into a limited class on glider construction, and suffered two broken ribs flying the training glider they built. He continued courses at Kiev until he was accepted into the Bauman Moscow State Technical University (MVTU, BMSTU) in July 1926, having the famous aircraft designer Andrei Tupolev as his mentor, who was a professor there.

Korolev studied specialized aviation topics until 1929, while living with his family in the typically crowded conditions of Moscow. Korolev enjoyed opportunities to fly gliders and powered aircraft during this part of his education. He designed a glider in 1928, and flew it in a competition the next year. The Communist Party accelerated the education of engineers in 1929 to meet the country's urgent need for their skills. Korolev obtained a diploma by producing a practical aircraft design by the end of the year.

== Early career ==
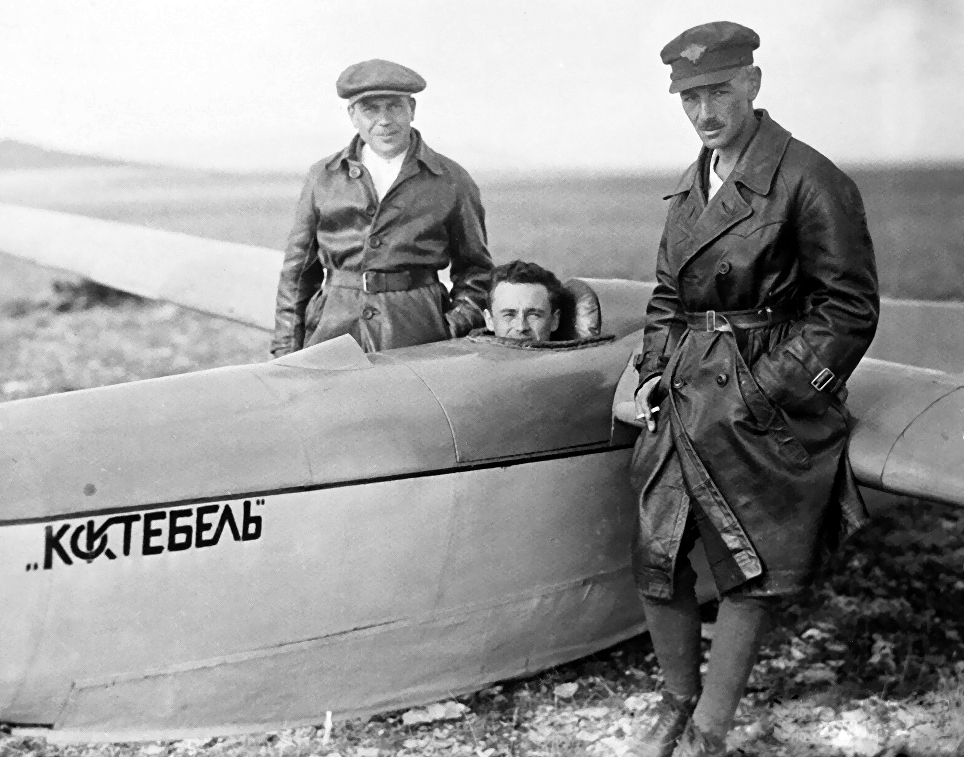
Korolev sitting in the cockpit of glider "Koktebel."

After graduation, Korolev worked with some of the best Soviet designers at the 4th Experimental Section aircraft design bureau OPO-4 headed by Paul Aimé Richard who emigrated to the USSR from France in the 1920s. He did not stand out in this group, but while so employed he also worked independently to design a glider capable of performing aerobatics. In 1930 he became interested in the possibilities of liquid-fueled rocket engines to propel airplanes, while working at the Central Aerohydrodynamic Institute (TsAGI) as a lead engineer on the Tupolev TB-3 heavy bomber. Korolev earned his pilot's license in 1930 and explored the operational limits of the aircraft he piloted, wondering what was beyond his plane's altitude limit and how he could get there. Many believe this was the start of his interest in space.

Korolev married Xenia Vincentini on 6 August 1931. He had first proposed marriage to her in 1924, but she then declined so she might continue her higher education. In 1931, Korolev and space travel enthusiast Friedrich Zander participated in the creation of the Group for the Study of Reactive Motion (GIRD), one of the earliest state-sponsored centers for rocket development in the USSR. While there, he met Mikhail Tikhonravov, a glider pilot and aerospace engineer who would later work under Korolev's Sputnik group. In May 1932 Korolev was appointed chief of the group; and military interest encouraged funding of group projects. On August 18, 1933, GIRD launched the first hybrid propellant rocket, the GIRD-09, and on November 25, 1933, the Soviet's first liquid-fueled rocket GIRD-X.

Growing military interest in this new technology caused GIRD to be merged with the Gas Dynamics Laboratory (GDL) at Leningrad in 1933 to create the Reactive Scientific Research Institute (RNII), which brought together the best of the Soviet rocket talent, including Korolev, Georgy Langemak, and former GDL engine designer Valentin Glushko. Korolev was appointed deputy head under Ivan Kleymyonov, however in 1934, following a disagreement over the direction of RNII, Korolev was demoted to section chief of winged missiles and was replaced by Georgy Langemak. (Note: 11.01.1934. the position of deputy head of the RNII was eliminated, and instead of it the post of chief engineer was introduced.) Korolev supervised development of cruise missiles and a crewed rocket-powered glider. "Rocket Flight in Stratosphere" was published by Korolev in 1934. On 10 April 1935, Korolev's wife gave birth to their daughter, Natalya; and they moved out of Sergei's parents' home and into their own apartment in 1936. Both Korolev and his wife had careers, and Sergei always spent long hours at his design office.

== Imprisonment ==
Joseph Stalin's Great Purge severely damaged RNII, with Director Kleymyonov and Chief Engineer Langemak arrested in November 1937, tortured, made to sign false confessions and executed in January 1938. Glushko was arrested in March 1938 and with many other leading engineers was imprisoned in the Gulag. Korolev was arrested by the NKVD on 27 June 1938 after being accused of a variety of charges, including false charges extracted from Kleymyonov, Langemak and Glushko. He was tortured in the Lubyanka prison to extract a confession. Glushko and Korolev had reportedly been denounced by Andrei Kostikov who became the head of RNII after its leadership was arrested.

Korolev was sent to prison, where he wrote many appeals to the authorities, including Stalin himself. Following the fall of NKVD head Nikolai Yezhov, the new chief Lavrenti Beria chose to retry Korolev on reduced charges in 1939; but by that time Korolev was on his way from prison to a Gulag forced labour camp in Kolyma in the far east of Siberia, where he spent several months in a gold mine before word reached him of his retrial. Work camp conditions of inadequate food, shelter, and clothing killed thousands of prisoners each month. Korolev sustained injuries, including possibly a heart attack and lost most of his teeth from scurvy before being returned to Moscow in late 1939. When he reached Moscow, Korolev's sentence was reduced to eight years. However, due to the intervention by his old mentor, Andrei Tupolev, he was relocated to a prison for scientists and engineers in September 1940. These were labor camps where scientists and engineers worked on projects assigned by the Communist party leadership. The Central Design Bureau 29 (CKB-29, ЦКБ-29) of the NKVD, served as Tupolev's engineering facility, and Korolev was brought here to work. During World War II, this sharashka designed both the Tupolev Tu-2 bomber and the Petlyakov Pe-2 dive bomber. The group was moved several times during the war, the first time to avoid capture by advancing German forces. Korolev was moved in 1942 to the sharashka of Kazan OKB-16 under Glushko. Korolev and Glushko designed the RD-1 KhZ auxiliary rocket motor tested in an unsuccessful fast-climb Lavochkin La-7R. Korolev was isolated from his family until 27 June 1944 when he—along with Tupolev, Glushko and others—was finally discharged by special government decree, although the charges against him were not dropped until 1957.

Korolev rarely talked about his experience in the Gulag, and lived under constant fear of being executed for the military secrets he possessed. He was deeply affected by his time in the camp, becoming reserved and cautious as a result. He later learned that Glushko was one of his accusers, and this was likely the cause of the lifelong animosity between the two men. The design bureau was handed over from NKVD control to the government's aviation industry commission. Korolev continued working with the bureau for another year, serving as deputy designer under Glushko and studying various rocket designs.

== Ballistic missiles ==
Korolev was commissioned into the Red Army with the rank of colonel in 1945; his first military decoration was the Badge of Honor, awarded in 1945 for his work on the development of rocket motors for military aircraft. On 8 September 1945, Korolev was brought to Germany along with many other experts to recover the technology of the German V-2 rocket. The Soviets worked with German specialists to understand and replicate the rocket technology, placing a priority on recreating the entire German V-2 rocket. In February 1946 the Institute Nordhausen was formed, with Korolev as Chief Engineer, Glushko as head of Engine assembly and propulsion systems and German Helmut Gröttrup, who previously worked with Wernher von Braun, as General Director. The work continued in East Germany until late 1946, when 2,000+ German scientists and engineers were sent to the USSR through Operation Osoaviakhim. Most of the German experts, Gröttrup being an exception, had not worked directly with Wernher von Braun. Many of the leading German rocket scientists, including Dr. von Braun himself, surrendered to Americans and were transported to the United States as part of Operation Paperclip.

Stalin made rocket and missile development a national priority upon signing a decree on 13 May 1946, and a new institute called Scientific Research Institute No. 88 (NII-88) was created for that purpose, in the suburbs of Moscow. Development of ballistic missiles was placed under the military control of Dmitriy Ustinov through the decree signed by Stalin, and Ustinov appointed Korolev as chief designer of long-range missiles at Department No. 3 of NII-88. During this period Korolev demonstrated his organisation and management capabilities by organising a "Council of Chief Designers", which assisted in circumnavigating the bureaucratic hierarchy of the Soviet missile industry. This group eventually assumed engineering control over the early Soviet space program.

Korolev returned from Germany in February 1947 and took up his duties as chief designer and Head of Department No 3 of NII-88, initially tasked with reproduction of the V-2. The Soviets were only able to obtain parts to assemble approximately a dozen V-2 rockets, so the decision was made to replicate a Soviet version, which was designated the R-1. Initially Korolev opposed this decision as he thought it was a waste of time and they should move immediately to manufacture a more advanced version, which had been designated the R-2. However Korolev was overruled and was ordered to assemble what V-2s they had for flight testing, then create the R-1 using Soviet infrastructure and materials. NII-88 also incorporated 170+ German specialists – including Helmut Gröttrup and Fritz Karl Preikschat – with approximately half based at Branch 1 of NII-88 on Gorodomlya Island in Lake Seliger some 200 kilometres (120 mi) from Moscow. The Germans provided a variety of support to the Soviet efforts, particularly on assembling the V-2 and creating the R-1.

The first Soviet tests of V-2 rockets took place in October 1947 at Kapustin Yar, with Korolev as management lead for the project. Numerous German engineers also participated in the tests. A total of 11 V-2 rockets were launched, with 5 reaching their designated targets. In September 1948 testing of the R-1 began at Kapustin Yar, where Korolev was a formal member of the "State Commission for testing the R-1". No Germans participated in these tests, which launched 9 rockets between September and November 1948.

"Chief Designer" Korolev (left) with "father of the Soviet atomic bomb" Igor Kurchatov (centre) and "Chief Theoretician" Mstislav Keldysh (right), 1956

Korolev continued to lobby for the design and construction of the R-2, including meeting with Stalin in April 1947, but faced competition from a proposal from the Germans, called the G-1. Whilst the German proposal was initially supported by Soviet management, Korolev opposed utilising German specialists for personal reasons and basically ignored their suggestions and advice. Due to political and security concerns, German specialists were not allowed knowledge or access to any Soviet missile design and in December 1948 work on the G-1 proposal was terminated. The Ministry of Defence decided to dissolve the German team in 1950 and repatriated the German engineers and their families between December 1951 and November 1953.

In April 1948 the go ahead for "scientific and experimental work" was approved, which led to the creation of the R-2. The R-2 doubled the range of the V-2, and was the first design to utilize a separable warhead. This was followed by the R-3, which had a range of 3,000 kilometres (1,900 mi), and thus could target England.

Glushko couldn't obtain the required thrust from the R-3 engines, so the project was canceled in 1952. Korolev joined the Soviet Communist Party that year to request money from the government for future projects including the R-5, with a more modest 1,200 kilometres (750 mi) range. It completed a first successful flight by 1953. The world's first true intercontinental ballistic missile (ICBM) was the R-7 Semyorka. This was a two-stage rocket with a maximum payload of 5.4 tons, sufficient to carry the Soviets' bulky nuclear bomb an impressive distance of 7,000 kilometres (4,300 mi). During the summer of 1957, the first three launches of the R-7 all failed, severely demoralizing Korolev and his colleagues. The failures also jeopardized his position and dream of using an R-7 to launch an artificial satellite in the future. The fourth test, completed on 21 August 1957, was finally able to deliver a dummy payload to the Kamchatka Peninsula. The Soviet news agency TASS made a brief announcement about the ICBM's success, but it was largely ignored or dismissed by members of the American public and media. Because of Korolev's success with the R-7 and because the Soviet Union had successfully created the ICBM before the United States of America, he was nationally recognized by the Soviet Union, although his name was kept secret. However, despite the Soviet R-7 initial success, it experienced later failures as it was not intended to be a practical weapon. On 19 April 1957 Korolev was declared fully "rehabilitated", as the government acknowledged that his sentence was unjust.

== Space program ==
Korolev was keenly aware of the orbital possibilities of the rockets being designed as ICBMs, ideas that were shared by Tikhonravov then working at NII-4. On 26 May 1954, six days after being tasked to lead the R-7 ballistic missile program, Korolev submitted a proposal to use the R-7 to launch a satellite into space, naming a technical report from Tikhonravov and mentioning similar work being carried out by Americans. After receiving lukewarm support from the Soviet leadership, Korolev initiated a modest satellite research project in coordination with Tikhonravov. To intensify his lobbying efforts, Korolev, along with other like-minded engineers, began writing speculative articles for Soviet newspapers on space flight. They were picked up by the press in the United States and the CIA, influencing American authorities to start their own satellite programs. On 29 July 1955, the Eisenhower administration announced the intention of the United States to launch "small Earth-circling satellites" for the International Geophysical Year. While the US government debated the idea of spending millions of dollars on this concept, Korolev suggested the international prestige of launching a satellite before the United States. On 5 August, he sent another proposal with American newspaper articles about the US program attached. Three days later, the Soviet leadership approved his plan. On 30 August, Korolev met with members of the Soviet defense and scientific communities. As a result, he was allowed to use the R-7 rocket to launch satellites, and his project also gained support from the Soviet Academy of Sciences. On 30 January 1956, the USSR Council of Ministers officially approved the satellite project in its decree number 149-88ss.

The original plan for the satellite called for a sophisticated scientific laboratory. Nicknamed "Object D", it would be the fifth type of payload built for the R-7 missile. Despite earlier work done by Tikhonravov, much of its design, such as pressurized equipment, long-range communications systems, automated switches, and a metal construct to work in space, had little precedent. By mid-1956, Korolev had finalized the modifications to the R-7 ICBM for a satellite launch, but the project as a whole was falling behind schedule. He feared that the United States would launch a satellite before he could. This was heightened by reports of the American Project Vanguard and a secret 1956 missile launch from Patrick Air Force Base, Florida. Meanwhile, testing of the R-7 rocket engine showed that its specific impulse would be lower than projected and thus insufficient for Object D's specifications. Korolev sent a revised plan calling for a simpler payload of approximately 100 kilograms. It was approved on 25 January 1957 as 'Object PS'.

Despite having achieved one successful flight of the R-7 rocket, Korolev still faced opposition from some officials to his plan of launching a satellite. In August 1957, he proposed letting the Central Committee make the call. Because no one wanted to risk losing the prestige to the United States, Korolev's satellite launch was finally approved. In September, a second successful flight of the R-7 was made, and 6 October was established as the target date for launching PS-1, the first of the Object PS-type satellites.

The lead designer of Object PS was Mikhail S. Khomyakov, and its deputy designer was Oleg G. Ivanovskiy. It was constructed in less than a month by the Tikhonravov group, while Korolev personally managed the assembly at a hectic pace. The satellite was a simple polished metal sphere no bigger than a beach ball, containing batteries that powered a transmitter using four external communication antennas. Korolev moved the launch date two days early, fearing a preemptive launch of their own satellite by the United States. PS-1 was successfully launched into space on 4 October 1957 as Sputnik 1, becoming the first artificial satellite of the Earth.

For security reasons, the names of chief individuals in the Soviet space program became a secret. They were allowed to prepare a report detailing the design and construction of Sputnik 1, however, which was published anonymously by Pravda on 9 October. Korolev also began writing other articles under the pseudonym "Professor K. Sergeyev".

The Soviet government initially had a low-key response to the success of the launch. International reaction was electrifying and tumultuous, however, which the Soviets later capitalized on. Political ramifications of the accomplishment continued for decades. Nikita Khrushchev—initially bored with the idea of another Korolev rocket launch—was pleased with this success after the wide recognition, and encouraged launch of a more sophisticated satellite less than a month later, in time for the 40th anniversary of the October Revolution on 3 November.

Korolev and close associate Mstislav Keldysh wished to up the ante of building a second, larger satellite by proposing the idea of putting a dog on board, which sufficiently caught the interest of the Soviet Academy of Sciences. This new Sputnik 2 spacecraft had six times the mass of the Sputnik 1, and carried the dog Laika as a payload. The entire vehicle was designed from scratch within four weeks, with no time for testing or quality checks. It was successfully launched on 3 November and Laika was placed in orbit. There was no mechanism to bring the dog back to Earth; the dog died from heat exhaustion after five hours in space.

The instrument-laden Sputnik 3 spacecraft was launched initially on 27 April 1958, but the satellite had a failure with the engine which caused the satellite to fall back down to Earth in separate pieces. On 15 May 1958, Sputnik 3 was successfully launched into orbit. The tape recorder that was to store the data failed after launch. As a result, the discovery and mapping of the Van Allen radiation belts was left to the United States' Explorer 3 and Pioneer 3 satellites. Sputnik 3 left little doubt with the American government about the Soviets' pending ICBM capability.

=== The Moon ===
Even before the Sputnik 1 launch, Korolev was interested in getting to the Moon. He came up with the notion to modify the R-7 missile in order to carry a package to the Moon. However, it was not until 1958 that this idea was approved, after Korolev wrote a letter explaining that his current technology would make it possible to get to the Moon. A modified version of the R-7 launch vehicle was used with a new upper stage. The engine for this final stage was the first designed to be fired in outer space. Mechta is the Russian word meaning "dream", and this is the name Korolev called his moon ships. Officially, the Soviet Union called them Lunas. The first three lunar probes launched in 1958 all failed in part because of political pressure forcing the launches to be rushed with an inadequate budget to test and develop the hardware properly before they were ready to fly. Korolev thought political infighting in Moscow was responsible for the lack of sufficient funding for the program, although the US space program at this early phase also had a scarcely enviable launch record. Once, when pressured to beat the US to a working lunar probe, Korolev allegedly exclaimed: "Do you think that only American rockets explode!?" The Luna 1 mission on 2 January 1959 was intended to impact the surface, but missed by about 6,000 kilometres (3,700 mi). Nevertheless, this probe became the first to reach escape velocity and the first to go near the Moon, as well as becoming the first man-made object to orbit the Sun. A subsequent attempt (Luna E-1A No.1) failed at launch, and then Luna 2 successfully impacted the surface on 14 September 1959, giving the Soviets another first. This was followed just one month later by an even greater success with Luna 3. It was launched only two years after Sputnik 1, and on 7 October 1959 was the first spacecraft to photograph the far side of the Moon, which was something the people of Earth had never seen beforehand.

The Luna missions were intended to make a successful soft landing on the Moon, but Korolev was unable to see a success. Luna 4 and Luna 6 both missed, Luna 5, Luna 7, and Luna 8 all crashed on the Moon. It was not until after Korolev's death that the Soviet Union successfully achieved a soft landing on the Moon with Luna 9.

Towards the latter part of Korolev's life, he had been working on projects for reaching the planets Mars and Venus, and even had spacecraft ready to reach both. The United States was also working towards reaching these planets, so it was a race to see who would be successful. Korolev's two initial Mars probes suffered from engine failures, and the five probes the Soviet Union launched in hopes of reaching Venus all failed between 1961 and 1962, Korolev himself supervised the launches of all probes.

On 1 November 1962, the Soviet Union successfully launched Mars 1 and although communications failed, was the first to complete a flyby of Mars. Later, the Soviet Union launched Venera 3, which was the first impact of Venus. It was not until after Korolev's death that the Soviet Union impacted Mars.

Korolev's group was also working on ambitious programs for missions to Mars and Venus, putting a man in orbit, launching communication, spy and weather satellites, and making a soft-landing on the Moon. A radio communication center needed to be built in the Crimea, near Simferopol and near Yevpatoria to control the spacecraft. Many of these projects were not realized in his lifetime, and none of the planetary probes performed a completely successful mission until after his death.

=== Human spaceflight ===
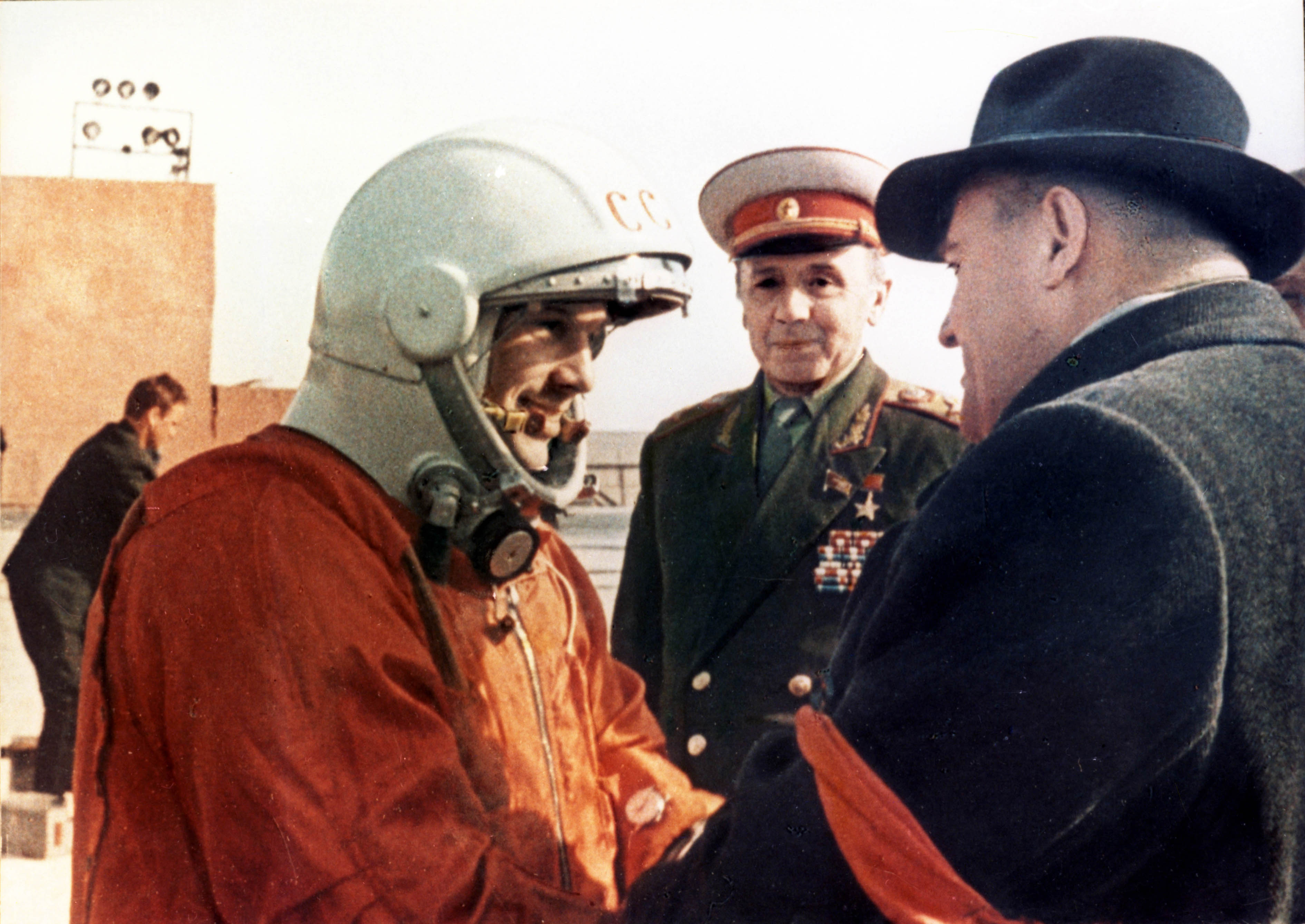
Korolev (right) with cosmonaut Yuri Gagarin and Marshal Kirill Moskalenko, before Gagarin's launch in Vostok 1 (1961)

Although he had conceived of the idea as early as 1948, Korolev's planning for the piloted mission began in 1958 with design studies for the future Vostok spacecraft. It was to hold a single passenger in a space suit, and be fully automated. The space suit, unlike the United States' pure oxygen system, was 80 percent nitrogen and only 20 percent oxygen. The capsule had an escape mechanism for problems prior to launch, and a soft-landing and ejection system during the recovery. The spacecraft was spherical, just like the Sputnik design, and Korolev explained his reasoning for this by saying "the spherical shape would be more stable dynamically". Beginning with work on the Vostok, Konstantin Feoktistov was recruited directly by Korolev to be the principal designer for crewed spaceflight vehicles.

On 15 May 1960 an uncrewed prototype performed 64 orbits of Earth, but the reentry maneuver failed. On 28 July 1960, two dogs by the names of Chaika and Lishichka were launched into space, but the mission was unsuccessful when an explosion killed the dogs. However, on 19 August, the Soviet Union became the first to successfully recover living creatures back to Earth. The dogs, Belka and Strelka were successfully launched into space on a Vostok spacecraft and they completed eighteen orbits. Following this, the Soviet Union sent a total of six dogs into space, two in pairs, and two paired with a dummy. Unfortunately, not all the missions were successful. After gaining approval from the government, a modified version of Korolev's R-7 was used to launch Yuri Alexeevich Gagarin into orbit on 12 April 1961, which was before the United States was able to put Alan Shepard into space. Korolev served as capsule coordinator, and was able to speak to Gagarin who was inside the capsule. The first human in space and Earth orbit returned to Earth via a parachute after ejecting at an altitude of 7 kilometres (23,000 ft). Gagarin was followed by additional Vostok flights, culminating with 81 orbits completed by Vostok 5 and the launch of Valentina Tereshkova as the first woman cosmonaut in space aboard Vostok 6.

Korolev proposed communications satellites and the Vostok craft was a spinoff from the Zenit spy satellite useful for photographic reconnaissance and Vostok had its defense importance acknowledged by the military. Korolev planned to move forward with Soyuz craft able to dock with other craft in orbit and exchange crews. He was directed by Khrushchev to cheaply produce more 'firsts' for the piloted program, including a multi-crewed flight. Korolev was reported to have resisted the idea as the Vostok was a one-man spacecraft and the three-man Soyuz was several years away from being able to fly. Khrushchev was not interested in technical excuses and let it be known that if Korolev could not do it, he would give the work to his rival, Vladimir Chelomey. But Russian Space Web describes this demand by Khrushchev as a legend and Challenge to Apollo says that the evidence that Khrushchev would have ordered these missions does not survive scrutiny.

Cosmonaut Alexei Leonov described the authority Korolev commanded at this time.

Long before we met him, one man dominated much of our conversation in the early days of our training; Sergei Pavlovich Korolev, the mastermind behind the Soviet space program. He was only ever referred to by the initials of his first two names, SP, or by the mysterious title of "Chief Designer", or simply "Chief". For those on the space program there was no authority higher. Korolev had the reputation of being a man of the highest integrity, but also of being extremely demanding. Everyone around him was on tenterhooks, afraid of making a wrong move and invoking his wrath. He was treated like a god.

Leonov recalled the first meeting between Korolev and the cosmonauts.

I was looking out of the window when he arrived, stepping out of a black Zis 110 limousine. He was taller than average;

I could not see his face, but he had a short neck and large head. He wore the collar of his dark-blue overcoat turned up and the brim of his hat pulled down.

"Sit down, my little eagles," he said as he strode into the room where we were waiting.

He glanced down a list of our names and called on us in alphabetical order to introduce ourselves briefly and talk about our flying careers.

On August 11, 1962, Korolyov launched the first group flight with Vostok 3 and 4 (with Andriyan Nikolayev and Pavel Popovich). The two spacecraft approached each other to 6.5 km. This was based on precise calculations already at launch and not on steering (maneuvering) of the spacecraft. During the flight, at Korolev's request, Popovich sang the Ukrainian song "Watching the sky and thinking a thought ..." (Ukrainian Дивлюсь я на небо, та й думку гадаю ..., poem by Mykhailo Petrenko) the first song from outer space.

The Voskhod was designed as an incremental improvement on the Vostok to meet Khruschev's goal. As a single capsule would be ineffective for proper travel to the Moon, the vehicle needed to be able to hold more people. Khrushchev ordered Korolev to launch three people on the Voskhod capsule quickly, as the United States was already doing unmanned tests of the 2 person Gemini. Korolev accepted, on the condition that more backing would be given to his N-1 rocket program. One of the difficulties in the design of the Voskhod was the need to land it via parachute. The three-person crew could not bail out and land by parachute. So the craft would need much larger parachutes in order to land safely. Early tests with the craft resulted in some failures until use of stronger fabric improved parachute reliability.

The resulting Voskhod was a stripped-down vehicle from which any excess weight had been removed; although a backup retrofire engine was added, since the more powerful Voskhod rocket used to launch the craft would send it to a higher orbit than the Vostok, eliminating the possibility of a natural decay of the orbit and reentry in case of primary retrorocket failure. After one uncrewed test flight, this spacecraft carried a crew of three cosmonauts, Komarov, Yegorov and Feoktistov, into space on 12 October 1964 and completed sixteen orbits. This craft was designed to perform a soft landing, eliminating a need for the ejection system; but the crew was sent into orbit without space suits or a launch abort system.

With the Americans planning a spacewalk with their Gemini program, the Soviets decided to trump them again by performing a spacewalk on the second Voskhod launch. After rapidly adding an airlock, the Voskhod 2 was launched on 18 March 1965, and Alexei Leonov performed the world's first spacewalk. The flight very nearly ended in disaster, as Leonov was just barely able to re-enter through the airlock, and plans for further Voskhod missions were shelved. In the meantime the change of Soviet leadership with the fall of Khrushchev meant that Korolev was back in favor and given charge of beating the US to landing a man on the Moon.

For the Moon race, Korolev's staff started to design the immense N1 rocket in 1961, using the NK-15 liquid fuel rocket engine. He also was working on the design for the Soyuz spacecraft that was intended to carry crews to LEO and to the Moon. As well, Korolev was designing the Luna series of vehicles that would soft-land on the Moon and make robotic missions to Mars and Venus. Unexpectedly, he died in January 1966, before he could see his various plans brought to fruition.

==== Criticism ====
Engineer Sergei Khrushchev, son of former Soviet Premier Nikita Khrushchev, explained in an interview some of the shortcomings he discerned in Korolev's approach, which in his opinion was why the Soviets didn't land on the Moon:

I think Russia had no chance to be ahead of the Americans under Sergei Korolev and his successor, Vasili Mishin. ... Korolev was not a scientist, not a designer: he was a brilliant manager. Korolev's problem was his mentality. His intent was to somehow use the launcher he had [the N1 rocket]. It was designed in 1958 for a different purpose and with a limited payload of about 70 tons. His philosophy was, let's not work by stages [as is usual in spacecraft design], but let's assemble everything and then try it. And at last it will work. There were several attempts and failures with Lunnik [a series of uncrewed Soviet moon probes]. Sending man to the moon is too complicated, too complex for such an approach. I think it was doomed from the very beginning.

Another reason the Soviet crewed lunar program didn't succeed was the rivalry between Korolev and Vladimir Chelomey. Their animosity was due to the intolerable persona of both men, and their desire for leadership at any cost. The two never said a harsh word about each other either in public or in private, but toppled each other's projects in any way possible. Instead of dividing competencies and responsibilities and cooperating in order to pursue the same goal, the two struggled for leadership in the space program. According to Khrushchev, who worked for Chelomey and knew both men well, they both would have preferred the Americans to land on the Moon first rather than their rival.

== Death ==
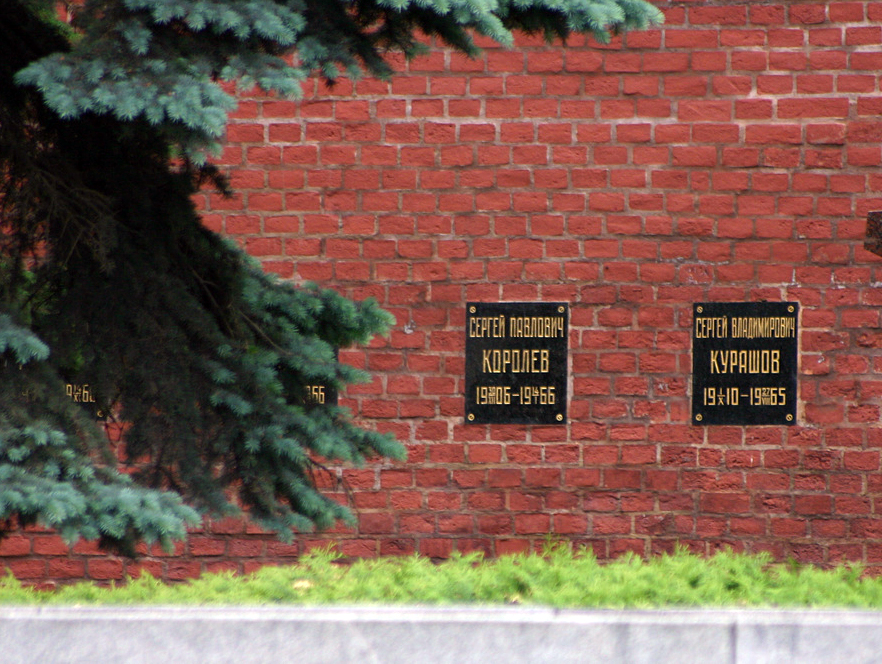
Korolev's tomb (left) in the Kremlin Wall Necropolis

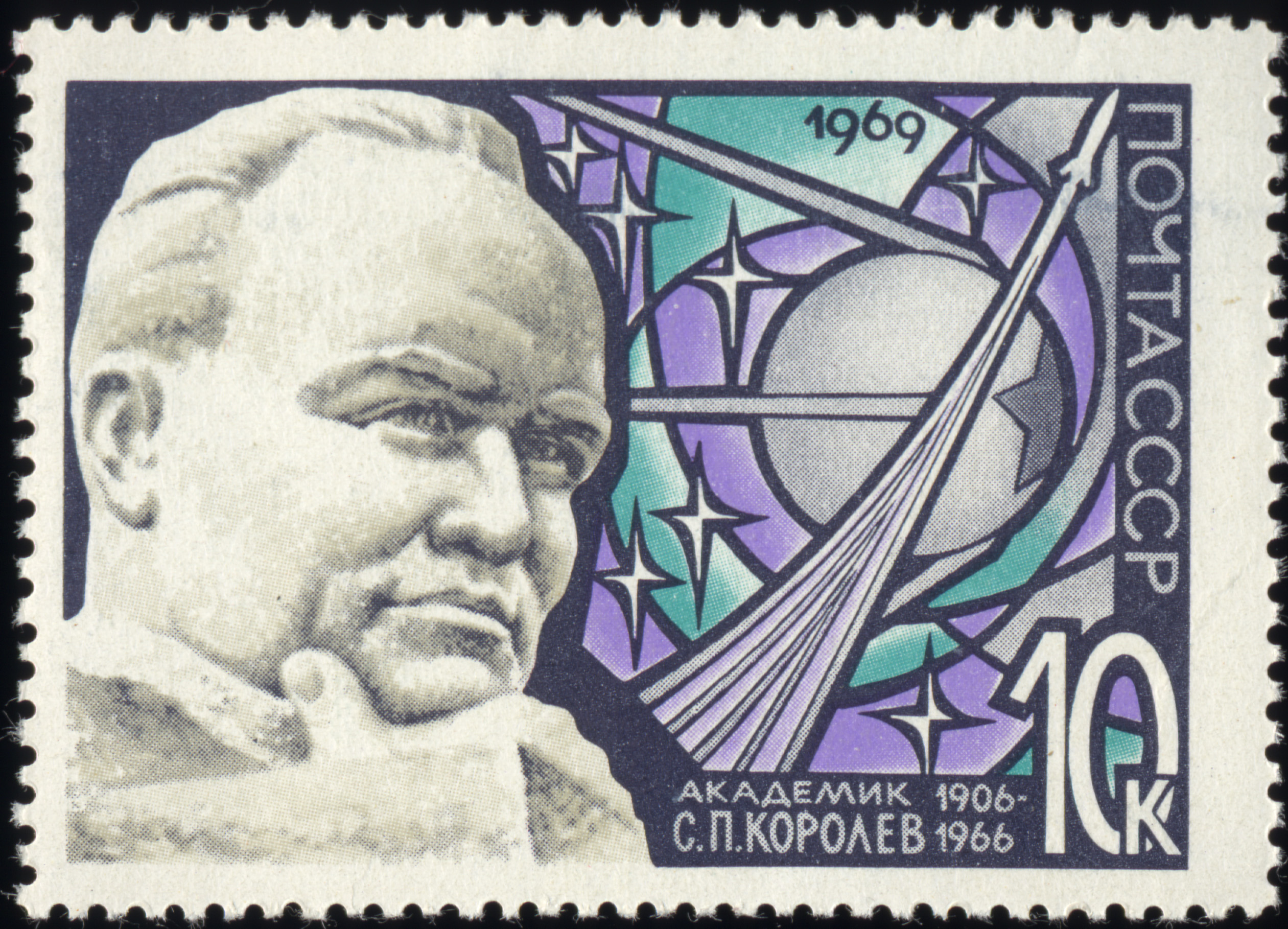
Korolev on a 1969 Soviet stamp (10 kopeks)

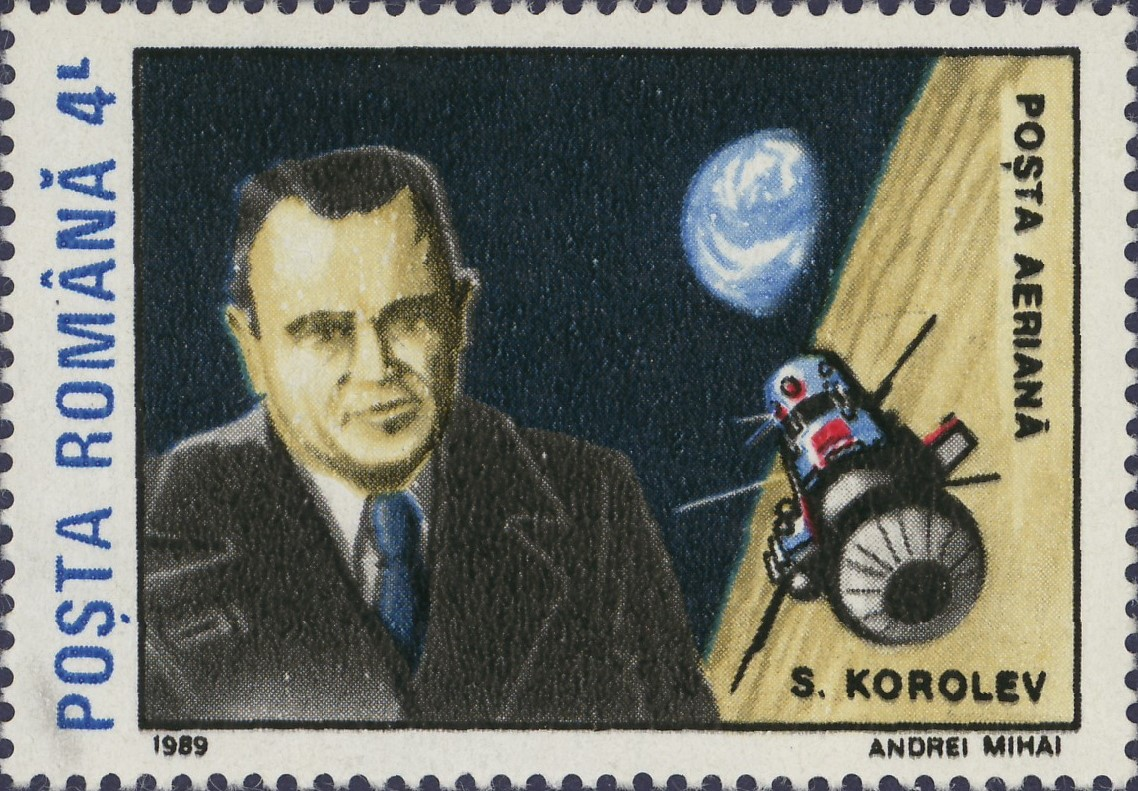
Korolev on a 1989 Romanian stamp

On 3 December 1960, Korolev suffered his first heart attack. During his convalescence, it was also discovered that he was suffering from a kidney disorder, a condition brought on by his detention in the Soviet prison camps. He was warned by the doctors that if he continued to work as intensely as he had, he would not live long. Korolev became convinced that Khrushchev was only interested in the space program for its propaganda value and feared that he would cancel it entirely if the Soviets started losing their leadership to the United States, so he continued to push himself.

By 1962, Korolev's health problems were beginning to accumulate and he was suffering from numerous ailments. He had a bout of intestinal bleeding that led to him being taken to the hospital in an ambulance. In 1964 doctors diagnosed him with cardiac arrhythmia. In February he spent ten days in the hospital after a heart problem. Shortly after, he was suffering from inflammation of his gallbladder. The mounting pressure of his workload was also taking a heavy toll, and he was suffering from a lot of fatigue. Korolev was also experiencing hearing loss, possibly from repeated exposure to loud rocket-engine tests.

The actual circumstances of Korolev's death remain somewhat uncertain. In December 1965, he was supposedly diagnosed with a bleeding polyp in his large intestine. He entered the hospital on 5 January 1966 for routine surgery, but died nine days later. It was stated by the government that he had what turned out to be a large, cancerous tumor in his abdomen, but Valentin Glushko later reported that he actually died due to a poorly performed operation for hemorrhoids. Another version states that the operation was going well when Korolev started to bleed. Doctors tried to provide intubation to allow him to breathe freely, but his jaws, injured during his time in a Gulag, had not healed properly and impeded the installation of the breathing tube. Korolev died without regaining consciousness. According to Harford, Korolev's family confirmed the cancer story. His weak heart contributed to his death during surgery.

Under a policy initiated by Stalin and continued by his successors, the identity of Korolev was not revealed until after his death. The purported reason was to protect him from foreign agents from the United States. As a result, the Soviet people did not become aware of his accomplishments until after his death. His obituary was published in the Pravda newspaper on 16 January 1966, showing a photograph of Korolev with all his medals. The paper identified him as "an outstanding scientist in the field of space technology". Korolev's ashes were interred with state honors in the Kremlin Wall.

Korolev is comparable to Wernher von Braun as the leading architects of the Space Race. Like von Braun, Korolev had to compete continually with rivals, such as Vladimir Chelomey, who had their own plans for flights to the Moon. Unlike the Americans, he also had to work with technology that in many aspects was less advanced than what was available in the United States, particularly in electronics and computers, and to cope with extreme political pressure.

Korolev's successor in the Soviet space program was Vasily Mishin, a quite competent engineer who had served as his deputy and right-hand man. After Korolev died, Mishin became the Chief Designer, and he inherited what turned out to be a flawed N1 rocket program. In 1972, Mishin was fired and then replaced by a rival, Valentin Glushko, after all four N-1 test launches failed. By that time, the rival Americans had already made it to the Moon, and so the program was canceled by CPSU General Secretary Leonid Brezhnev.

== Personal life ==
The Soviet émigré Leonid Vladimirov related the following description of Korolev by Valentin Glushko at about this time:

Short of stature, heavily built, with head sitting awkwardly on his body, with brown eyes glistening with intelligence, he was a skeptic, a cynic and a pessimist who took the gloomiest view of the future. 'We are all going to be shot and there will be no obituary' (Khlopnut bez nekrologa, Хлопнут без некролога – i.e. "we will all vanish without a trace") was his favorite expression.

— Lev Kerber

Korolev rarely drank alcohol, and lived a fairly austere lifestyle.

His career also contributed to instability in his personal life. About 1946, the marriage of Korolev and Vincentini began to break up. Vincentini was heavily occupied with her own career, and about this time Korolev had an affair with a younger woman named Nina Ivanovna Kotenkova, who was an English interpreter in the Podlipki office. Vincentini, who still loved Korolev and was angry over the infidelity, divorced him in 1948. Korolev and Kotenkova were married in 1949, but he is known to have had affairs even after this second marriage.

Korolev's passion for his work was a characteristic that made him a great leader. He was committed to training younger engineers to move into his space and missile projects, even while consumed with his own work. Korolev knew that students would be the future of space exploration, which is why he made such an effort to communicate with them. Arkady Ostashev was one of Korolev's students, who Korolev hired to do dissertation work before later becoming an engineer and working on the R-2.

== Awards and honours ==
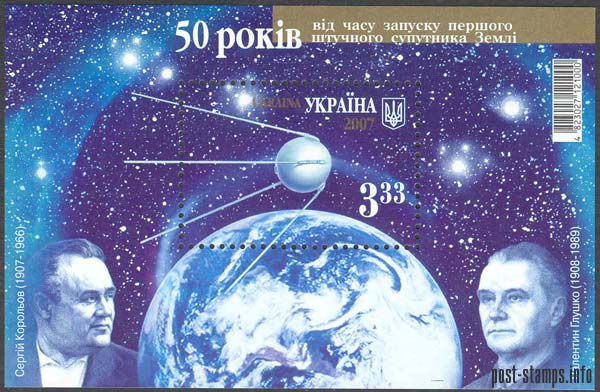
Korolev (left) and Valentin Glushko on a 2007 Ukrainian stamp

Korolev, an engineer by training, was able to navigate the unpredictable and dangerous Soviet politics of Moscow, secure funding and support of leadership to the cause that was only vaguely defined (space exploration), create a shared vision to sell the idea to an extended set of disparate stakeholders, and create an entirely new segment of science.

Among his awards, Korolev was twice honored as Hero of Socialist Labour, in 1956 and 1961. He was also a Lenin Prize winner in 1971, and was awarded the Order of Lenin three times, the Order of the Badge of Honour and the Medal "For Labour Valour".

In 1958 he was elected to the Academy of Sciences of the USSR. In 1969 and 1986, the USSR issued 10 kopek postage stamps honoring Korolev. In addition he was made an Honorary Citizen of Korolyov and received the Medal "In Commemoration of the 800th Anniversary of Moscow".

Sergei Khrushchev claimed that his father Nikita rejected a Nobel Prize for Korolev out of concern that the award would anger the rest of the Council of Chief Designers.

In 1990, Korolev was inducted into the International Air & Space Hall of Fame at the San Diego Air & Space Museum.

=== Namesakes ===
A street in Moscow was named after Korolev in 1966 and is now called Ulitsa Akademika Korolyova (Academician Korolyov Street). The memorial home-museum of akademician S.P.Korolyov was established in 1975 in the house where Korolev lived from 1959 till 1966 (Moscow, 6th Ostankinsky Lane,2/28). In 1976 he was inducted into the International Space Hall of Fame.

The town of Kaliningrad (historic name Podlipki, Moscow region) was renamed Korolev in honour of Korolev in 1996. There is now an oversized statue of Korolev located in the town square. The town is the home of RSC Energia, the largest space company in Russia. RSC Energia was also renamed to S.P. Korolev Rocket and Space Corporation Energia in later years.

Astronomical features named after Korolev include the crater Korolev on the far side of the Moon, a crater on Mars, and the asteroid 1855 Korolyov.

Quite a large number of streets exist with his name in Russia as well as in Ukraine. In Zhytomyr on the other side of the street (vulytsia Dmytrivska) from the house where Korolev was born is the Korolev Memorial Astronautical Museum.

A visual phenomenon iconic to a type of rocket staging event is named the Korolev cross in honor of Korolev.

Aeroflot named a brand new Boeing 777 after Korolev in 2021.

== Portrayals in fiction ==
The first portrayal of Korolev in Soviet cinema was made in the 1972 film Taming of the Fire, in which Korolev was played by Kirill Lavrov.

The 2001 story The Chief Designer by Andy Duncan is a fictionalized account of Korolev's career.

He was played by Steve Nicolson in the 2005 BBC co-produced docudrama Space Race.

The 2007 graphic novel Laika contains sections told from Korolev's perspective.

In 2011 the British writer Rona Munro produced the play Little Eagles on Korolev's life – its premiere was from 16 April to 7 May 2011, in an RSC production at the Hampstead Theatre, with Korolev played by Darrel D'Silva and Yuri Gagarin by Dyfan Dwyfor.

He was played by Mikhail Filippov in the 2013 Russian film Gagarin: First in Space.

He was portrayed by Vladimir Ilyin in the 2017 Russian film The Age of Pioneers.

According to Ronald D. Moore, the creator of the alternate history TV series For All Mankind, the divergence point of the alternate timeline was that Korolev instead survives the surgery in 1966, which leads to the Soviets landing on the moon first. Korolev appears in two episodes of the second season, where he is portrayed by Endre Hules.

In Star City, a spin-off to For All Mankind, he appears as a central character, referred to as the Chief Designer, portrayed by Welsh actor Rhys Ifans.

The popular music band Public Service Broadcasting released the song “Korolev” in 2015 as a tribute to Sergei Korolev. It features as a B-Side to the single “Sputnik” which is taken from their album The Race For Space.

== See also ==
- Hermann Oberth
- History of rockets
- Kerim Kerimov
- List of aerospace engineers
- Maxime Faget
- Mstislav Keldysh
- Robert Ludvigovich Bartini
- Soviet rocketry
- Timeline of the Space Race
- Yuri Kondratyuk
- Mikhail Yangel
- Vladimir Chelomey

== Bibliography ==
- Baker, David; Zak, Anatoly (9 September 2013). Race for Space 1: Dawn of the Space Age. RHK.
- Chertok, Boris (2005). Rockets and People Volumes 1-4. National Aeronautics and Space Administration.
- Harford, James (1997). Korolev: How One Man Masterminded the Soviet Drive to Beat America to the Moon. John Wiley & Sons. ISBN 0-471-14853-9.
- Korolyov, S. P. (1934). Rocket Flight in the Stratosphere. Moscow: State Military Publishers (Гос. воен. изд.).
- Korolyov, S. P. (1957). The Practical Significance of Konstantin Tsiolkovsky's Proposals in the Field of Rocketry. Moscow: USSR Academy of Sciences.
- Mishin, Vassily P. (12 November 1991). "Why Didn't We Fly to the Moon?". JPRS-Usp-91-006: 10.
- Scott, David; Alexei Leonov (2006). Two Sides of the Moon: Our Story of the Cold War Space Race. with Christine Toomey. St. Martin's Griffin. ISBN 0-312-30866-3.
- Siddiqi, Asif (2000). Challenge to Apollo: the Soviet Union and the space race, 1945-1974 (PDF). Washington, D.C.: National Aeronautics and Space Administration, NASA History Div.
- Vladimirov, Leonid (1971). The Russian Space Bluff. David Floyd (trans.). The Dial Press. ISBN 0-85468-023-3.
- Brzezinski, Matthew (2008). Red Moon Rising: Sputnik and the Hidden Rivalries that Ignited the Space Age. Henry Holt and Company. ISBN 0-8050-8858-X.
- Ostashev, A. I. (2010). Sergei Pavlovich Korolyov – The Genius of the 20th Century. Moscow State Forest University. ISBN 978-5-8135-0510-2.
- Lopota, C. A., ed. (2014). S. P. Korolev. Encyclopedia of life and creativity. RSC Energia. ISBN 978-5-906674-04-3.
