= Kurt Magnus =

German applied mechanics scientist and engineer

Kurt Magnus (September 8, 1912 - December 12, 2003) was a German scientist, expert in the field of applied mechanics, a pioneer of mechatronics, modern navigation technology and inertial sensors.

Kurt Magnus earned his doctorate in 1937 from the Georg-August University in Göttingen in the field of "force-coupled gyroscopes". In 1942 Magnus habilitated on the subject of "General movements of rigid bodies in moving reference systems".

By the end of World War II during Operation Osoaviakhim (a secret operation part of Soviet WWII reparations), on October 22, 1946 he was forcibly displaced to the Soviet Union where he worked until 1953 at Sergei Korolev's secret facility codenamed NII-88 (NII stands in Russian for research & development institute) in Podlipki and at its branch located on the Gorodomlya Island on Lake Seliger in Tver Oblast.

After return to Germany Magnus continued his scientific career. In 1958 he took chair in what is now the University of Stuttgart and at the Technical University of Munich in 1966.

== Awards ==
- Ludwig Prandtl Ring
- Wilhelm Exner Medal
- Bavarian Maximilian Order for Science and Art
- Grashof Medal of the Association of German Engineers
- On July 18, 2018 a Memorial plaque for Prof. Kurt Magnus was unveiled in the Faculty of Mechanical Engineering at the Technical University of Munich
