= Fritz Karl Preikschat =

- Preikschat at Boeing (≈1965)
- Born: Fritz Karl Preikschat; September 11, 1910; Insterburg, Prussia, Germany
- Died: September 2, 1994 (aged 83); Kirkland, Washington, U.S.
- Citizenship: Germany; United States (after 1962)
- Education: Hindenburg Polytechnic
- Occupations: Engineer and inventor
- Spouse: Martha Wasgindt (m. 1937–1994)
- Children: Ursula Gallagher; Ekhard Preikschat

Fritz Karl Preikschat (September 11, 1910 – September 2, 1994) was a German-American, electrical and telecommunications engineer and inventor. He had more than three German patents and more than 23 U.S. patents, including a dot matrix teletypewriter (Germany, 1957), a blind-landing system for airports (1965), a phased array system for satellite communications (1971), a hybrid car system (1982), and a scanning laser diode microscope for particle analysis (1989). He was the only engineer to work on both sides of the Space Race: a lab manager for NII-88 (TsNIIMash) in Soviet Union (1946–1952) and a lead engineer for the Space division of Boeing (1960s).

== Early career in Germany ==
In 1934, he graduated from Hindenburg Polytechnic in Oldenburg, Germany with a degree in "Elektrotechnik" (electrical engineering). He then served in a minesweeper unit of Kriegsmarine (German Navy).

From 1940 to 1945 (during WW2), he worked as an engineer and lab manager in the radar group of GEMA (see Radar in World War II). At the end of WW2, his family fled to Dresden and survived (except for one relative) the Bombing of Dresden in World War II. His family then resettled as refugees in the Bavarian town of Amberg.

== Contributor to the Soviet Union's rocket and satellite programs (1946–1952) ==
In 1946, he was one of the more than two thousand German specialists forcibly brought to the Soviet Union under Operation Osoaviakhim. He was then one of the more than 170 German specialists – headed by Helmut Gröttrup – brought to Branch 1 of NII-88 on Gorodomlya Island in Lake Seliger. From 1946 to 1952, he was an engineer and head of the high frequency lab, working on a guidance system, among other things, for the early Soviet rocket program. He also worked on a design for a 6-dish (array) deep-space tracking station for the early Soviet space program. In 1960, the Soviet Union implemented the full 8-dish (with 52-foot diameter dishes) deep-space tracking station called Pluton in the Crimea.

== Debriefing by U.S. Army (1952–1954) ==
In June 1952, he was released from the Soviet Union and returned to East Germany. The Berlin Wall had not yet been constructed, so he was able to cross the border via the Berlin U-Bahn from East Berlin, East Germany, to West Berlin (Western Zone). He quickly met an American MP, who put him in a safe house where he spent two months getting debriefed by the U.S. Army on the Soviet Union's rocket program. He was also interviewed over several months by Reinhard Gehlen. Later, he published a 114-page report (in German; he finalized the report in April 1954) for the Army on the Soviet Union's "Microwave-based Control System for Long-Distance Rockets". In September 1952, he was flown from West Berlin (Western Zone) to Frankfurt, West Germany, where he was reunited with his family (his wife, daughter and son), finally ending a difficult, six-year separation.

== Dot matrix teletypewriter (Germany, 1957) ==
In 1952–1954, he filed five patent applications for a dot matrix teletypewriter (aka "teletype writer 7 stylus 35 dot matrix"), later granted in 1957 (see German patent #1,006,007). In April 1953, he was hired by Telefonbau und Normalzeit GmbH (TuN, later called Tenovis). In 1956, TuN introduced the device to the Deutsche Bundespost (German Post Office), which did not show interest. In his final contract with TuN (dated May 31, 1957), he sold the five patent applications to TuN for 12,000 Deutsche Marks and 50% of the device's net future profits (while retaining rights for the U.S. market). Photos and working papers of the dot matrix teletypewriter prototype were submitted to his first U.S. employer, General Mills, in 1957. A set of working papers for the dot matrix teletypewriter were published in 1961. At Boeing in 1966–1967, the dot matrix teletypewriter design was the basis for a portable facsimile machine (using dot matrix), which was prototyped and evaluated for military use by teams at Boeing, including sales.

== Emigration to the United States (1957) ==
On June 28, 1957, he emigrated to the United States via Operation Paperclip, sponsored by an Army contract with General Mills. The contract was cancelled shortly afterwards, so he hired on as principal scientist at the Johns Hopkins Applied Physics Laboratory, where he worked on satellite transponder communications. He became a U.S. citizen in 1962.

From 1959 to 1970, he mostly worked as lead engineer in the Space Division of Boeing (near Seattle). He also had a stint in the Military Products Group at Honeywell (in Seattle).

== Boeing: Blind-landing system for airports (1965) ==
In 1965, while at Boeing, he invented a blind-landing system for airports. It was an automated blind-landing system and featured a 3D-display showing the virtual landing strip overlaid on the actual visual display. The system was not implemented.

== Boeing: Phased array system for satellites (1971) ==
In 1971, while lead engineer in the telecommunications group of the space division of Boeing in Kent, Washington, he, along with Orral Ritchey and John Nitardy, invented a phased array system for satellite communications. The patent was assigned to Boeing and a technical paper was written. The invention won Boeing's Technical Paper Award for 1970.

== F.P. Research Lab: new moisture meter (1972–1979) ==
In 1968–1974 (several patents granted), he invented a new moisture meter for pulp and paper mills. He co-founded F.P. Research Lab to commercialize the moisture meter. In 1979, F.P. Research Lab was acquired by BTG AB (Sweden), a technology company serving the global pulp and paper industry.

== Hybrid car system (1982) ==
In 1982, he invented an electric propulsion and braking system for cars. The system allows for significant improvement of fuel efficiency by recycling energy from the car's braking system (regenerative braking). While clearly not the only patent relating to the hybrid electric vehicle, the patent was important based on more than 120 subsequent patents directly citing it. The system was only patented in the U.S. and not prototyped or commercialized. In 1997, with the introduction of the Prius in Japan, Toyota was one of the first companies to commercialize a hybrid electric vehicle (i.e. using regenerative braking technology). In July 2000 – the same month the patent expired – Toyota introduced the Prius globally (see Toyota press releases). The Prius became America's best selling hybrid electric car.

== Lasentec: Particle-size analyzer (1987–1994) ==
In 1989, he, with son Ekhard Preikschat, invented a scanning laser diode microscope for particle-size analysis. He and Ekhard Preikschat co-founded Lasentec to commercialize it. In 2001, Lasentec was acquired by Mettler Toledo (NYSE: MTD). About ten thousand systems have been installed globally – over $1 Billion in cumulative sales – mostly in the pharmaceutical industry to provide in-situ control of the crystallization process in large purification systems.
