= Operation Osoaviakhim =

Post WWII Soviet secret operation

Operation Osoaviakhim (Russian: Операция «Осоавиахим», romanized: Operatsiya "Osoaviakhim") was a secret Soviet operation in which more than 2,500 German scientists, engineers and technicians, who worked in several areas from companies and institutions relevant to military and economic policy in the Soviet occupation zone of Germany (SBZ) and Berlin, as well as around 4,000 more family members, totalling more than 6,000 people, were taken from former Nazi Germany to the Soviet Union. It took place in the early morning hours of October 22, 1946 when MVD (previously NKVD) and Soviet Army units under the direction of the Soviet Military Administration in Germany (SMAD), headed by Ivan Serov, rounded up German scientists and transported them by rail to the USSR.

Much related equipment was also moved, the aim being to literally transplant research and production research centers such as the V-2 rocket center of Mittelwerk, from Germany to the Soviet Union, and collect as much material as possible from test centers such as the Luftwaffe's central military aviation test center at Erprobungstelle Rechlin, taken by the Red Army on 2 May 1945.

The codename Osoaviakhim is the acronym of the then large Soviet organization OSOAVIAKhIM ('Society for the Assistance of Defense, Aircraft and Chemical Construction'), which recruited civilian specialists for the Red Army during World War II (and later reconstituted as DOSAAF) which was mistakenly used as "Aktion Ossawakim" for the first time on October 23, 1946, by the broadcaster Deutsche Nachrichtenagentur (DENA) of the US occupying power and adapted by the Central Intelligence Group (CIG), a predecessor of the CIA, as Operation Ossavakim. Another predecessor organization of the CIA, the Office of Strategic Services (OSS) used the term Operation Ossavakim for the first time on January 13, 1947. The usage of the codename was not identified in Soviet archives.

The Osoaviakhim campaign served to secure the transfer of know-how and is described in Russia as "Foreign Specialists in the USSR" (Иностранные специалисты в СССР). In some cases, the families of those affected and their furniture were also relocated. In most cases the years in the Soviet Union passed without employment contracts and legitimization through personal documents.

Although much larger in scale, it had some parallels with earlier Allied operations such as the Alsos Mission, Operation Paperclip and Russian Alsos, which forcibly moved military specialists between German occupation zones or abducted them to the United Kingdom, United States and the Soviet Union, respectively.

== Background history ==
At the end of World War II, the Soviet Union had been devastated by Nazi Germany, with 27 million people killed, 1,700 cities destroyed and agricultural production reduced to famine proportions. At the Yalta Conference, Winston Churchill, Franklin D. Roosevelt, and Joseph Stalin agreed that war reparations were payable by Nazi Germany in the form of equipment, goods and German labour, with Roosevelt and Stalin agreeing to an amount of $20 billion, with 50% ($10 billion) going to the Soviet Union. The Soviets, United States and to a lesser extent Britain and France all seized "intellectual" reparations from Germany. The dismantling of German industry also ensured the complete disarmament of its war potential, as agreed at the Potsdam Conference.

A race between the Allies developed to acquire as many scientists and engineers as possible, particularly nuclear physicists needed for the development of nuclear weapons, followed by rocket technology, such as the V2 missile ('Retaliation Weapon 2') and the Messerschmitt Me 163 Komet. Expertise in gyroscopic instrumentation for inertial guidance and modern advances in airplane construction, such as turbojet-engines or swept wings were also sought. Other fields of special interest were, including but not limited to, miscellaneous electronic devices, color film products, chemical weapons and optics. Hiring or abduction of these skilled workers was one of the objectives of the so-called 'Trophy commissions'.

Immediately following the German Instrument of Surrender, skilled workers, documents, laboratories and material were shipped abroad in the western zones of occupation. Among these, the "abduction of German nuclear physicists to Farm Hall" as a part of Operation Epsilon became particularly well known. The Soviet atomic bomb project secured a group of nearly 100 German specialists as Russian Alsos, including Gustav Hertz, Nikolaus Riehl, Peter Adolf Thiessen, and Manfred von Ardenne, and brought them to the Soviet Union "not entirely voluntarily, but without physical pressure".

In the Soviet occupation zone of Germany, the Soviet Union initially set up a large number of design offices, e.g. the Institut Nordhausen in the vicinity of Bleicherode and the Institut Berlin for the reconstruction of German guided missiles. By May 1946 the Soviets founded the Zentralwerke to include both institutes as well as manufacturing and test sites from the earlier Mittelwerk underground factory in the Nordhausen, Thuringia area with more than 6,000 German employees. It was directed by Helmut Gröttrup who had profound knowledge of the V2 intricacies from his work for the V2 development in the Peenemünde Army Research Center.

The operation formally known as Operation Osoaviakhim was decreed on 13 May 1946 under resolution No. 1017–419 by the Council of Ministers of the Soviet Union with the objective to accomplish "Transfer of the construction bureaus as well as 2,000 German specialists til end of 1946".

The People's Commissariat for Internal Affairs commissioned Ivan Serov, Head of the Soviet Military Administration in Germany with the secret preparations. The Soviet Union wanted to ensure full access to German technologies both through the transfer of expert knowledge and the dismantling of the production facilities and their reconstruction in the Soviet Union. In addition, according to the Potsdam Agreement of August 2, 1945, developing and manufacturing weapons in Germany was banned. With the decree of the Council of Ministers of the Soviet Union No. 1539-686 of July 9, 1946, Stalin laid October 22, 1946 as the start of the dismantling operations.

Operation Osoaviakhim was unprecedented in its dimensions: in a concerted, secret operation on October 22, 1946, employees of facilities within the entire Soviet zone of occupation were drafted within half a day and 92 freight trains were made available for transport. In detail, for example, it was presented as follows: Days beforehand, Kurt Magnus noticed unusual bustle of the Soviet military and the arrival of freight trains at the station in Bleicherode. A specialist from Dessau managed to escape hours beforehand. He could not manage to warn his colleagues by telephone; as the telephone network had been shut down. Public transport in Dessau had been suspended as well. A designer at Zeiss suffered a fatal heart attack when he was informed that he would be transported away.

Between midnight and 3am, when everybody was asleep. They knew exactly where I lived, first of all: a few days before I was captured, a fellow came. They had a key – they had everything to the apartment, to the door. There was one interpreter who told me [in German]: "Get up! You are being mobilized to work in Russia", and there were about half a dozen soldiers with machine guns, who surrounded me. When I wanted to get to the toilet, they checked it out first to make sure there was no escape hatch. It was a very tight operation. They did that with every family. Many families came, while I was alone.

— Fritz Karl Preikschat, a German engineer recruited to the Soviet Union via Operation Osoaviakhim and held in the Soviet Union for six years

In the first mention of Operation Osoaviakhim, a number of companies and facilities were named which were confirmed and supplemented in the follow-up secret orders which are mentioned below. However, so far, the known documents do not entirely match with reality.

The remainder of this article differentiates between:

- Facilities of the engine and aviation industry
- Optical technologies and glass industry (Jena)
- Other institutions (electrical industry, chemical industry, film chemistry, shipping, etc.)

Different institutions were responsible for the handling of respective sectors in Operation Osoaviakhim: The Ministry of Aviation Industry of the USSR was responsible for the former: These operations involved facilities throughout the Soviet Zone, and those affected commented on their stay in the USSR (see also: biographies section). The Ministry of Armaments of the USSR was responsible for the operations concentrating on Jena.

== Course and consequences of the transportation ==
In the night of 21 October 1946, the day following the 1946 Soviet occupation zone state elections as well as the 1946 Berlin state election until 22. October 1946, soviet officers accompanied by a translator as well as an armed soldier stopped by the homes of German specialists, ordering them to pack their belongings. Trucks and trains had been prepared and were standing ready for the immediate transport of around 6,500 people against their will.

- 1,385 of these specialists had worked in the Ministry of Aviation developing planes as well as jet engines and Surface-to-air missiles,
- 515 in the Ministry of Armaments, primary concerned with development of liquid rocket engines,
- 358 in the Ministry of Telecommunications Industry (Radar and Telemetry),
- 81 in the Ministry of Chemical Industry,
- 62 in the Ministry of Shipbuilding (gyro and navigation systems),
- 27 in the Ministry of Agricultural Machinery (solid rocket engines),
- 14 in the Ministry of Cinema and Photographic Industry,
- 3 in the Ministry of Petroleum Industry and
- 107 in establishments of the Ministry of Light Industry.

On October 22, the Berlin branch of the Social Democratic Party of Germany protested against the deportation. On October 24, the Allied Control Council received a complaint from the British representative of the Allied Kommandatura, along with the consent of the American and French Representatives, condemining the transfer of 400 Berlin specialists, including residents of the British sector of Berlin, to the Soviet Union as a violation of valid labor laws as well as violations of human rights. A discussion of the Allied Control Council about this deportation was adjourned by its coordination committee on October 29 because of "strong differences about the voluntary or involuntary character of the transports" between the Soviet and the American and British representatives.

Inside the Soviet occupation zone of Germany and East Berlin all protests were silenced quickly following a short uproar of the Free German Trade Union Federation.

Both the German and Soviet factory management were surprised by this action.

Days, even years later, more precise details of this large-scale, perfectly planned and at the same time carefully kept secret deportation operation leaked out.

Sudden attacks were made not only in Bleicherode, but all over the entire Soviet occupation zone:

In Halle, Leipzig and Dresden; in Dessau, Jena and Rostock; in Brandenburg, Potsdam and East Berlin. According to credible estimates, around 20,000 Germans – fitters, foremen, technicians, engineers, designers and scientists, women and children – were picked up, loaded and transported in that one night. [...] 92 trains loaded with human loot passed through Frankfurt (Oder) at this time.

— Kurt Magnus, a gyro specialist that had been transported to Gorodomlya Island

Despite this, the affected specialists and their families were doing well compared to citizens of the Soviet Union and the Soviet Zone, apart from the suffering of deportation and isolation. The specialists earned more than their Soviet counterparts. The scientists, technicians and skilled workers were assigned to individual projects and working groups, primarily in the areas of Aeronautics and rocket technology, nuclear research, Chemistry and Optics. The stay was given for about five years.

In the following years, equipment from numerous high-tech companies, including those from Carl Zeiss (Jena), Junkers (Dessau) and the Siebel works (Halle), were dismantled and shipped to the Soviet Union. This was part of the reparations payments agreed upon in the Potsdam Agreement. The above-mentioned deportation secured the specialists needed for operation and continuation for the Soviet Union in advance. Their goals were to advance the expansion of the armaments industry, as well as developing nuclear and rocket technology.

For strategic reasons, they also did not want to leave military research and development in the SBZ, especially since the Potsdam Agreement provided for the demilitarization of Germany.

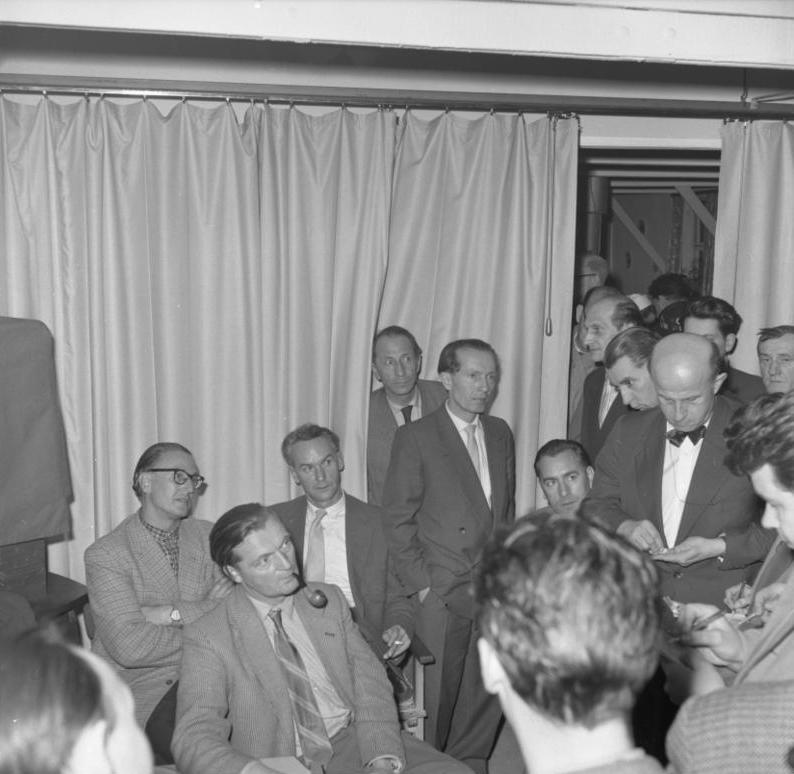
Return of the last prisoners of war from the Soviet Union, 1958

Historian Daniel Bohse describes it as follows:

The Soviets were only interested in skimming off the specialist knowledge of the technicians and engineers in order to be able to develop their own missile program on this basis. At the end of 1947, the German scientists had done their duty when these replica German V2 rockets were repeatedly successfully launched, and then the Soviets took matters into their own hands and a year later, in November 1948, they had the first launch of the Soviet ones, which were developed by Korolev who completed the R1 rocket based on the German V2.

Under threat of reprisals, specialists and their relatives were forbidden from handing over, sending or taking written documents back home, such as construction documents and diaries. Nevertheless, some specialists, including Baade and his colleagues did just that, as literature of the development of the first German passenger jet aircraft, the Baade 152 shows.

After this period of intellectual quarantine had passed, the specialists returned to Germany between 1950 and 1958, the majority of them before 1954. Before leaving, they were taught to keep their years in the Soviet Union secret. Some specialists received chairs in GDR universities (e.g., Werner Albring, Waldemar Wolff), became an East German party official like Erich Apel. Otherwise the GDR had difficulties to offer adequate jobs because the industry was mostly down. Brunolf Baade was given responsibility for developing and producing a passenger jet. A portion of about 10% made it to West Germany, Austria or the US, among them Fritz Karl Preikschat, Helmut Gröttrup and Kurt Magnus.

== Jet engine and aviation industry ==
Initially, so-called experimental design offices (OKBs) were set up in the Soviet occupation zone of Germany, which were under Soviet-German management. By the middle of 1946, some of these had developed into extensive development companies, such as the central works (Zentralwerke) in Bleicherode which had several thousand employees. In this respect, the Control Council regulations on the restriction of German research were handled extremely laxly by the SMAD up to the fall of 1946. Such institutions were transformed into Soviet joint-stock companies (SAGs).

The military strategic importance of these institutions led to conflicts with the Allied treaties which had been agreed upon in the Soviet Zone, which is why certain Soviet leadership considered transferring these institutions to their motherland. This decision was in turn rejected by an opposition in Soviet leadership on the grounds that competitors should not be brought into one's own country. Following these complications, Stalin decided to move specialist personnel and material to the Soviet Union on April 2, 1946.

Rocket designer Sergei Korolev was a technical adviser on the part of the Soviet Union with the rank of colonel, which had been seconded to the Zentralwerke in Bleicherode and involved in this campaign.

On April 19, 1946, secret order No. 228ss was issued by the USSR Ministry of Aviation Industry under Mikhail Khrunichev concerning the details of relocating the German engine and aircraft industry, particularly the relocation of people and material.

== Optical and glass industry ==
While extensive literature regarding the aforementioned specialists exists, this is not the case for the optics and glass specialists from Jena. The corresponding Soviet Order in dealing with the Carl-Zeiss-Works and the Jenaer Glaswerk Schott & Gen. in Jena was dealt was secret order No. 186 of the USSR Ministry of Armaments of July 16, 1946.

While research and development in the engine and aircraft industries were the focus of Soviet interest, in Jena's optical and glass industries both R&D and the construction of adequate production lines were also of importance to Soviet interest. In addition to the deportation of development personnel, this also resulted in the deportation of production personnel to train Soviet specialists and the extensive deportation of production equipment. This in turn meant that Jena was no longer able to pay the reparations demanded by the Soviet side with the remaining means of production, which led to differences between the SMA of the SBZ and Moscow. Ustinow originally intended to liquidate the Zeiss works, which the Soviet side (paying reparations for) and the willingness of the Zeiss workforce to rebuild did not allow for.

Even so, the Zeiss works were hit very hard by this action, as that they were looted by US troops in the months after the end of the Second World War as part of the so-called Carl Zeiss works mission and even more important parts of the works had been transferred to the American occupation zone.

== Collection of contemporary press articles ==
While the forced deportation of German speciality workers from Berlin to the Soviet Union which has so far affected approximately 500 technicians and electrical workers is still in full swing, a similar measure has begun in Halle and Dessau, where so far about approximately 1000 employees and workers have been requested to allegedly emigrate voluntarily to Russia. Allegedly among those evacuees from the Russian sector of Berlin was Prof. E. Habann, a well-known authority on radio frequency.

— Report in the Graz newspaper 'Arbeiterwille' from October 25, 1946

Regarding the reports of an alleged deportation of workers from the Russian zone, the Russian military authorities stated: No Germans have been forcibly deported to the Soviet Union, a number of special workers traveled to Russia with their families in order to work in the Russian industry for two to three years of after voluntarily signing a contract.

— Report in the Austrian newspaper 'Neues Österreich' from October 25, 1946

The Reporter of the London radio station, Beer, who is currently on stay in Berlin, reports on the transfer: 'It is clear that the transfer of German workers to Russia is not a measure in retaliation of the Soviet occupation zone of Germany's election defeat, but that these measures are also used in the others Russian occupation areas where the Soviet occupation zone of Germany emerged as the strongest party from the election campaign. It is probably a measure which has been prepared for some time, then postponed until after the elections so as not to adversely affect the election results.'

— Report in the Graz newspaper 'Arbeiterwille' from October 26, 1946

As the Foreign Office reports, a certain number of German technicians from the English occupation zone in Germany have been called to Great Britain by the official government. It is worth noting that these skilled workers went to Britain voluntarily. Is it explained in informed circles that the matter of the kidnapping of German experts by the Russians did not go beyond the scope of the Allied command and did not give rise to any diplomatic changes between the occupying powers.

— Report in the Graz newspaper 'Arbeiterwille' from October 27, 1946

A detailed statement by the Russian occupation authorities on the question of the transfer of German technicians and skilled workers was published in Berlin newspapers under Russian control. The statement comes to the fore on two points:

1. Only a few groups of German specialists, engineers, technicians and workers have left so far. They were provided with employment contracts.

2. The Russian approach follows the example of the Western Allies, especially England and America.

— Report in the Graz newspaper 'Arbeiterwille' from October 29, 1946

== Key recruits by Operation Osoaviakhim (incomplete list) ==
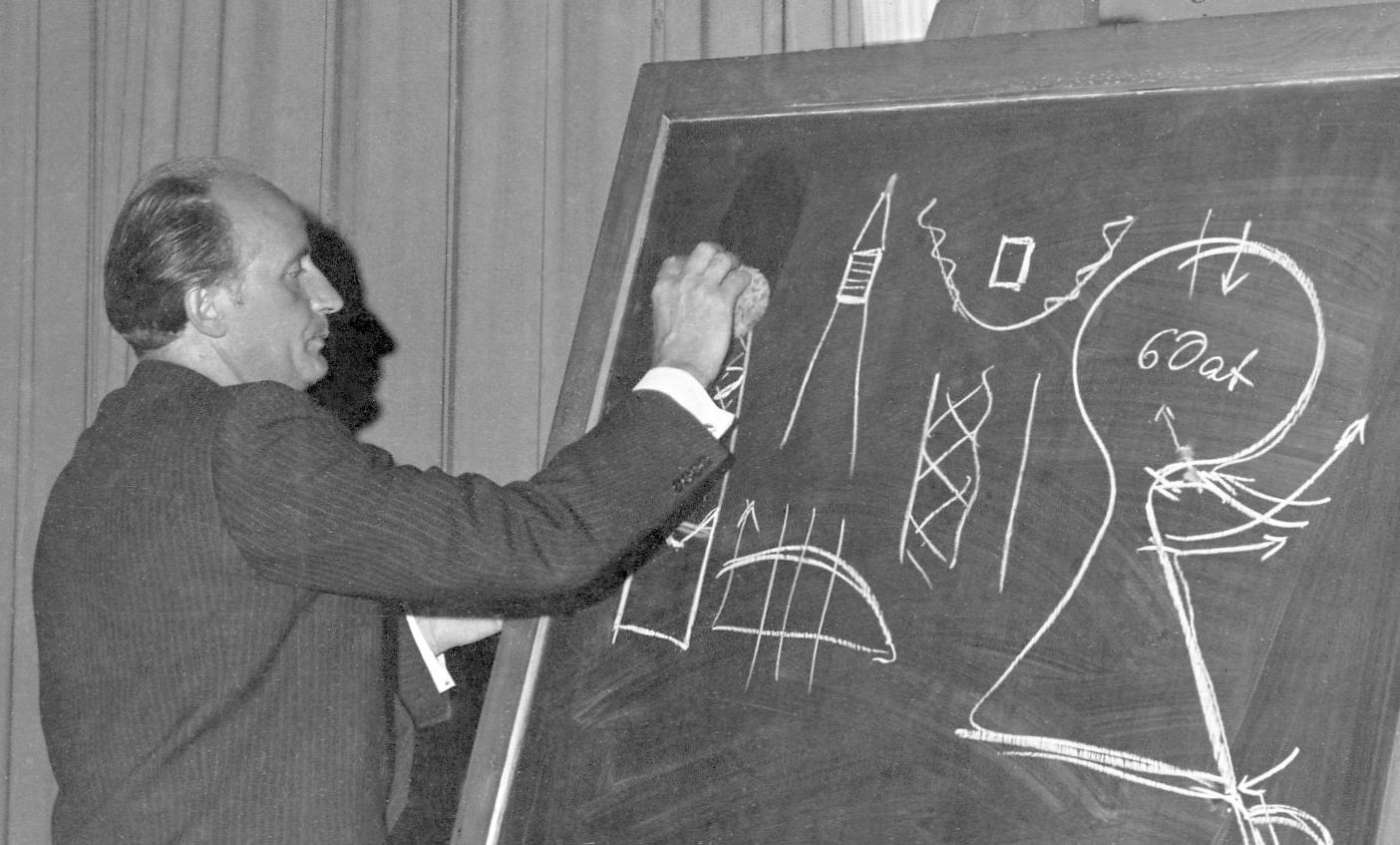
Helmut Gröttrup explaining the basic principles of rockets (1958). He returned from USSR to Germany in 1953.

- Hugo Schmeisser – arms designer, developed the first successful assault rifle, StG 44.
- Werner Gruner – arms designer, known for designing the MG 42, one of Nazi Germany's main general-purpose machine guns. Became an emeritus professor at TU Dresden in East Germany.
- Karl-Hermann Geib – physical chemist who, in 1943, developed the Girdler sulfide process which is regarded as the most cost-effective process for producing heavy water.
- Erich Apel – former rocket engineer at the Peenemünde Army Research Center, worked in the V-2 rocket program with Wernher von Braun. Apel later became a high-ranking East German party official and minister.
- Helmut Gröttrup – engineer and rocket scientist, worked in the V-2 rocket program. Invented the smart card in 1967.
- Fritz Karl Preikschat – electrical and telecommunications engineer, invented an improved dot matrix printing teletypewriter. Worked for both sides of the space race, as a lab manager for NII-88 and later a lead engineer for the Space division of Boeing.
- Brunolf Baade – aeronautical engineer and former Nazi party member, led the development of the East German Baade 152, the first jet airliner to be developed in Germany.
- Ferdinand Brandner – aerospace designer and former SS Standartenführer (colonel), played a major role in the development of the Kuznetsov NK-12 turboprop engine used on Tupolev Tu-95 bombers.
- Hans Wocke – airplane designer, former chief developer at Junkers Aircraft and Motor Works.
- Siegfried Günter – aircraft designer responsible for the world's first rocket-powered and turbojet airframes, father of the "thrust modulation theory".
- Friedrich Asinger – chemist and former Nazi party member well known for his development of a multi-component reaction, the Asinger reaction for the synthesis of 3-thiazolines.
- Alfred Rieche – chemist who discovered the Rieche formylation, a type of formylation reaction.
- Kurt Magnus – professor of applied mechanics and pioneer of mechatronics and inertial sensors.
- Alfred Klose – professor of applied mathematician and astronomer.

== See also ==
- Allied plans for German industry after World War II
- German influence on the Soviet space program
- Operation Paperclip, US operation on German specialists
  - List of Germans relocated to the US via the Operation Paperclip
