= Helmut Gröttrup =

German engineer, rocket scientist and inventor of the smart card

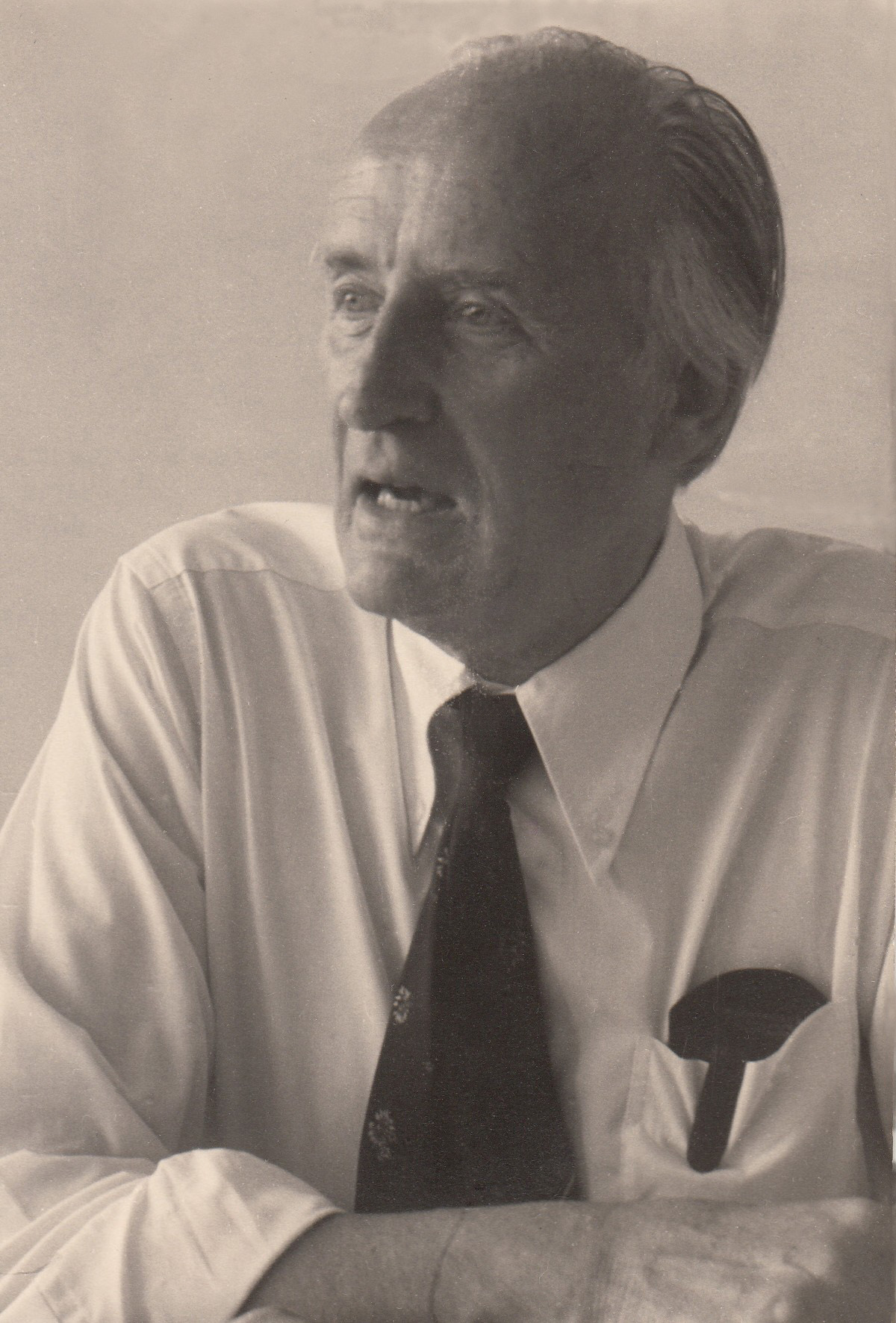
- Gröttrup, c. 1977
- Born: Helmut Gröttrup; February 12, 1916; Cologne, Kingdom of Prussia, German Empire
- Died: July 4, 1981 (aged 65); Munich, West Germany
- Citizenship: Germany
- Education: Technische Hochschule Berlin
- Occupation: Engineer
- Spouse(s): Irmgard Rohe (married 1940-1964); Christine Storzum (married 1964-1981)
- Children: Peter Gröttrup; Ursula Gröttrup; Johannes Gröttrup; Bernhard Gröttrup; Elisabeth Gröttrup

Helmut Gröttrup (12 February 1916 – 4 July 1981) was a German engineer, rocket scientist and inventor of the smart card. During World War II, he worked in the German V-2 rocket program under Wernher von Braun. From 1946 to 1950 he headed a group of 170 German scientists who were forced to work for the Soviet rocketry program under Sergei Korolev. After returning to West Germany in December 1953, he developed data processing systems, contributed to early commercial applications of computer science and coined the German term "Informatik". In 1967 Gröttrup invented the smart card as a "forgery-proof key" for secure identification and access control (ID card) or storage of a secure key, also including inductive coupling for near-field communication (NFC). From 1970 he headed a start-up division of Giesecke+Devrient for the development of banknote processing systems and machine-readable security features.

== Education ==
Helmut Gröttrup's father Johann Gröttrup (1881–1940) was a mechanical engineer. He worked full-time at the Bund der technischen Angestellten und Beamten (Butab), a federation for technical staff and officials of the social democratic trade union in Berlin. His mother Thérèse Gröttrup (1894–1981), born Elsen, was active in the peace movement. Johann Gröttrup lost his job in 1933 when the Nazi Party came into power.

From 1935 to 1939 Helmut Gröttrup studied applied physics at the Technische Hochschule in Charlottenburg (now Technische Universität Berlin) and made his thesis with professor Hans Geiger, the co-inventor of the Geiger counter. He also worked for Manfred von Ardenne's research laboratory Forschungslaboratorium für Elektronenphysik.

== German rocketry program ==
From December 1939, Helmut Gröttrup worked in the German V-2 rocket program at the Peenemünde Army Research Center with Walter Dornberger and Wernher von Braun. In December 1940, he was made department head under Ernst Steinhoff for developing remote guidance and control systems.

Since October 1943 Gröttrup had been under SD surveillance. A report stated that he, his wife Irmgard, Wernher von Braun, and his colleague Klaus Riedel were said to have expressed regret at an engineer's house one evening that they were not working on a spaceship and that they felt the war was not going well; this was considered a "defeatist" attitude. A young female dentist who was an SS spy reported their comments. Combined with Himmler's false charges that they were communist sympathizers and had attempted to sabotage the V-2 program, the Gestapo detained them on March 21, 1944, and took them to a Gestapo cell in Stettin (now Szczecin, Poland), where they were held for two weeks without knowing the charges against them. Walter Dornberger and major Hans Georg Klamroth, representative of counterintelligence at Peenemünde, obtained their conditional release so that the V-2 program could continue.

== Soviet rocketry program ==
After World War II, Gröttrup refused to join Wernher von Braun who contracted US missile development together with 120 high-level specialists from Peenemünde. This was because family members had to stay in Germany. Instead, in September 1945, Gröttrup decided to work for the reconstruction and manufacturing of the V-2 rockets as head of the Büro Gröttrup in Bleicherode in Thuringia within the Soviet Occupation Zone. Although most of the rocket specialists were retained by the US in West Germany, he was able to attract outstanding scientists for work in Bleicherode, among them Kurt Magnus, Werner Albring, Johannes Hoch, Waldemar Wolff to reconstruct the development documents of the V-2 rocket and improve the control system based on gyroscope for the inertial navigation system. In March 1946, he was appointed German head of Institut Nordhausen and, in May 1946, General Manager of the Zentralwerke which occupied more than 5,000 employees for the manufacturing of the V-2 rockets and included suppliers of the earlier Mittelwerk, V-2 test sites and Institut Berlin for the reconstruction of the Wasserfall surface-to-air missile. Gröttrup worked under the supervision of Sergei Korolev and Boris Chertok who reported to the Soviet military government of Maj. Gen. Lev Gaidukov and Dmitry Ustinov, the Minister of Armaments.

During the night on 22 October 1946, a selected group of around 200 German scientists and engineers - plus equipment - from the Zentralwerke were unexpectedly and forcibly (at gunpoint) moved to the USSR as part of Operation Osoaviakhim by 92 trains with more than 2,300 German specialists including other domains of German technology. From 1946 until September 1950, Gröttrup headed the more than 170 German specialists working in Podlipki in the north east section of Moscow as part of Korolev's NII-88 and in Branch 1 of NII-88 on Gorodomlya Island in Lake Seliger. The German team was indirectly overseen by Sergei Korolev, the "chief designer" of the Soviet rocketry program. In September 1950, Gröttrup was discharged as head of the German team because he refused to continue work on other Soviet projects, and was replaced by Johannes Hoch and later Waldemar Wolff.

In 1947-48, Gröttrup and his team helped Korolev with the R-1 project, a recreation of the V-2 missile using Russian manufacturing and materials. At Kapustin Yar, he helped Korolev supervise the launching of 20 rebuilt V-2 rockets and analyze failure causes. In October 1947 they succeeded for the first time. As a reality check on Korolev's missile proposals, official Dmitriy Ustinov asked Gröttrup and his small team to design several improved missile systems, including the R-10 (G-1), R-12 (G-2), the R-14 (G-4), and the R-15 (G-5) which was similar to the A9/A10 long range missile von Braun designed during the war. None of these projects went beyond the design stage. However, the theoretical work of the German scientists proposed improved solutions due to lack of material, and new ideas significantly contributed to the later success of Soviet space program. Some ideas were incorporated in the R-2 and R-5 missile systems. The launcher for Sputnik 1's orbital flight in October 1957 was based on R-7 Semyorka with a bundling (packeting) of a total of 20 engines with conical rocket bodies, as already proposed by the German scientists in 1949 in Gorodomlja. For political reasons, however, the contributions made by the German collective of rocket scientists to Soviet missile development have long been considered insignificant by the public in East and West.

== Return to Germany ==
For secrecy reasons, German specialists were not allowed to work on important missile technologies after 1951, but they were kept in the USSR for a 1.5 year "cooling off" period so they could not give timely information to British Intelligence or American Intelligence. The majority of the Gorodomlya group was released in June 1952. Fritz Karl Preikschat, who managed the high frequency lab under Gröttrup from 1946-1952 on Gorodomlya Island, and several other specialists made it to West Germany, and were interrogated as "defectors" by the CIA and MI6 (as part of the operation "Dragon Return" on the Soviet rocketry program.

Gröttrup and twenty other German scientists (among them Kurt Magnus, Karl-Joachim Umpfenbach) were kept until November 1953, based on their knowledge and Soviet concerns that they would move to West Germany. Gröttrup and his family returned to East Germany on 22 November 1953, among the last group from Gorodomlya Island, and, within two weeks, escaped to Cologne in West Germany with the support of British and American Intelligence. In the interrogations he reported the details of German studies and concepts of long-range missiles R-12 (G-2), the R-14 (G-4). The MI6 rated him as "the best-informed" of the German returnees from Gorodomlya and that he provided "useful pointers regarding parallel Russian developments". which Korolev eventually demonstrated with successfully launching the Sputnik 1 satellite to orbit in November 1957.

Again, Helmut Gröttrup refused to work for the US missile program and, together with his family, was immediately put on the street.

== Invention of the smart card ==
From 1954 to 1958, Gröttrup worked for Standard Elektrik Lorenz in Pforzheim. He participated in developing the ER56, the first fully transistorized data processing system in Germany. With this, he installed one of the first commercial applications of data processing for managing the logistics of Quelle's mail-order business. In 1956, he and the German informatician Karl Steinbuch coined the word Informatik when they developed the Informatik-Anlage for Quelle's mail-order management, one of the earliest commercial applications of data processing. In 1959, he joined the Produktograph company of Joseph Mayr, which was later taken over by Siemens & Halske, for production data acquisition and monitoring. In 1965, he formed a company called DATEGE in the data processing industry. In February 1966, he filed the patent application "Identification Switch" for releasing a tapping process at a petrol station.

In February 1967, Gröttrup introduced the idea of incorporating an integrated circuit chip onto a plastic carrier and filed the patent DE1574074 in West Germany for a tamper-proof identification switch based on a semiconductor device. The parallel application DE1574075 described contactless communication via inductive coupling which became the basis for near-field communication (NFC) and radio-frequency identification (RFID) technology. The German Patent and Trade Mark Office has acknowledged these patent applications as the invention of the smart card. The primary use of the invention intended to provide identification by individual copy-protected keys for releasing the tapping process at unmanned gas stations or ID Card applications. In September 1968, Gröttrup, together with Jürgen Dethloff as an investor, filed further patents for this identification switch, first in Austria and in 1969 as subsequent applications in West Germany (DE1945777), the United States (US3678250 and US3678250), Great Britain (GB1317915 and GB1318850), and other countries.

== Banknote processing ==
In 1970, Giesecke & Devrient (G&D) took over DATEGE and founded the Gesellschaft für Automation und Organisation (GAO). Gröttrup was managing director in charge of developing machine-readable security features to prevent counterfeit money together with half- and fully automated banknote processing systems (such as ISS 300 and ISS/BPS 3000). The Banknote Processing division (since April 2018 G+D Currency Technology) has become the world market leader for banknote processing equipment since the mid-1990s and has developed single note inspection systems for banknote printing companies. In 1979, G&D presented the first smart card which later became the basic product of G+D Mobile Security. Gröttrup retired in 1980.

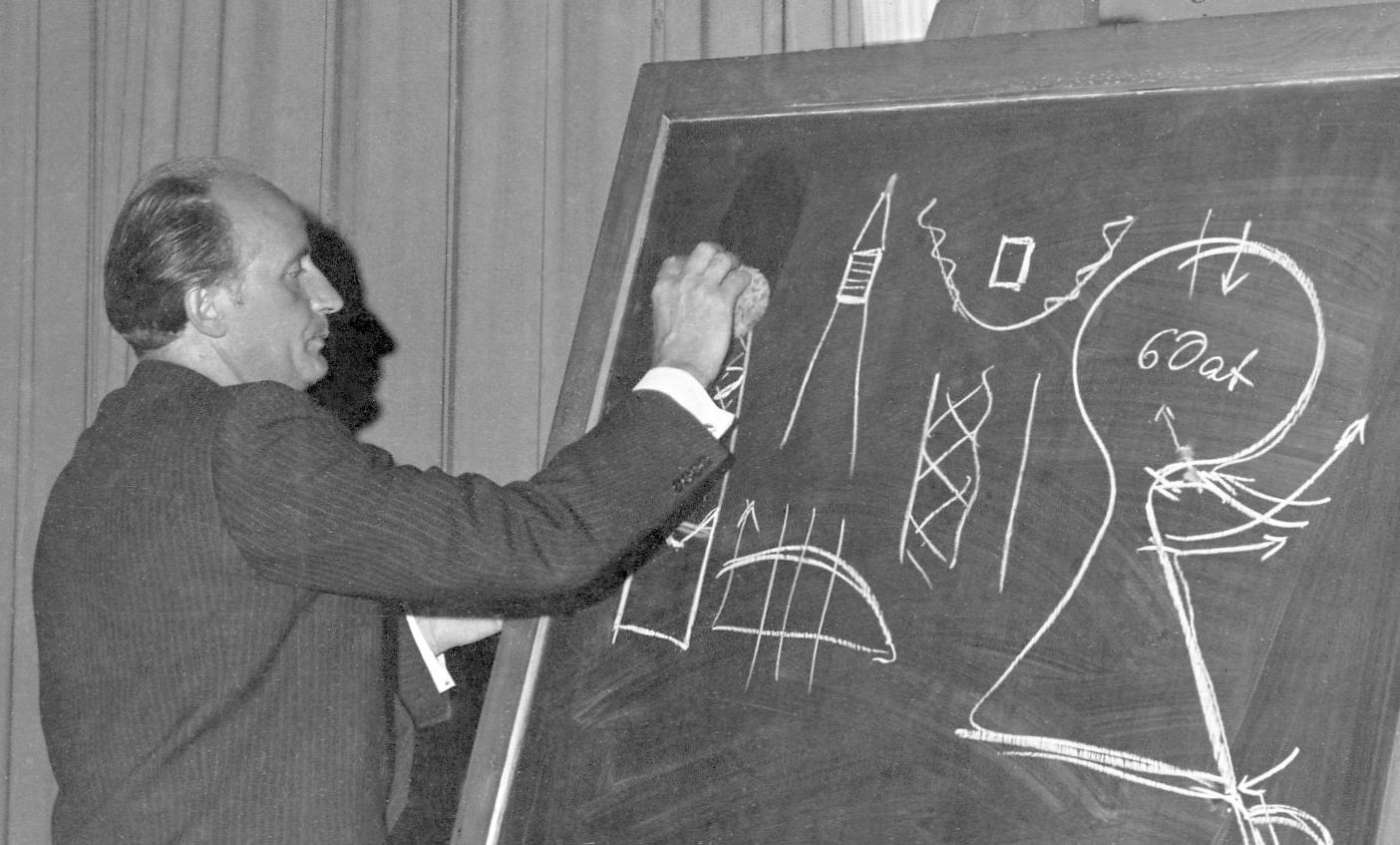
Helmut Gröttrup explaining the basic principles of rockets (1958)

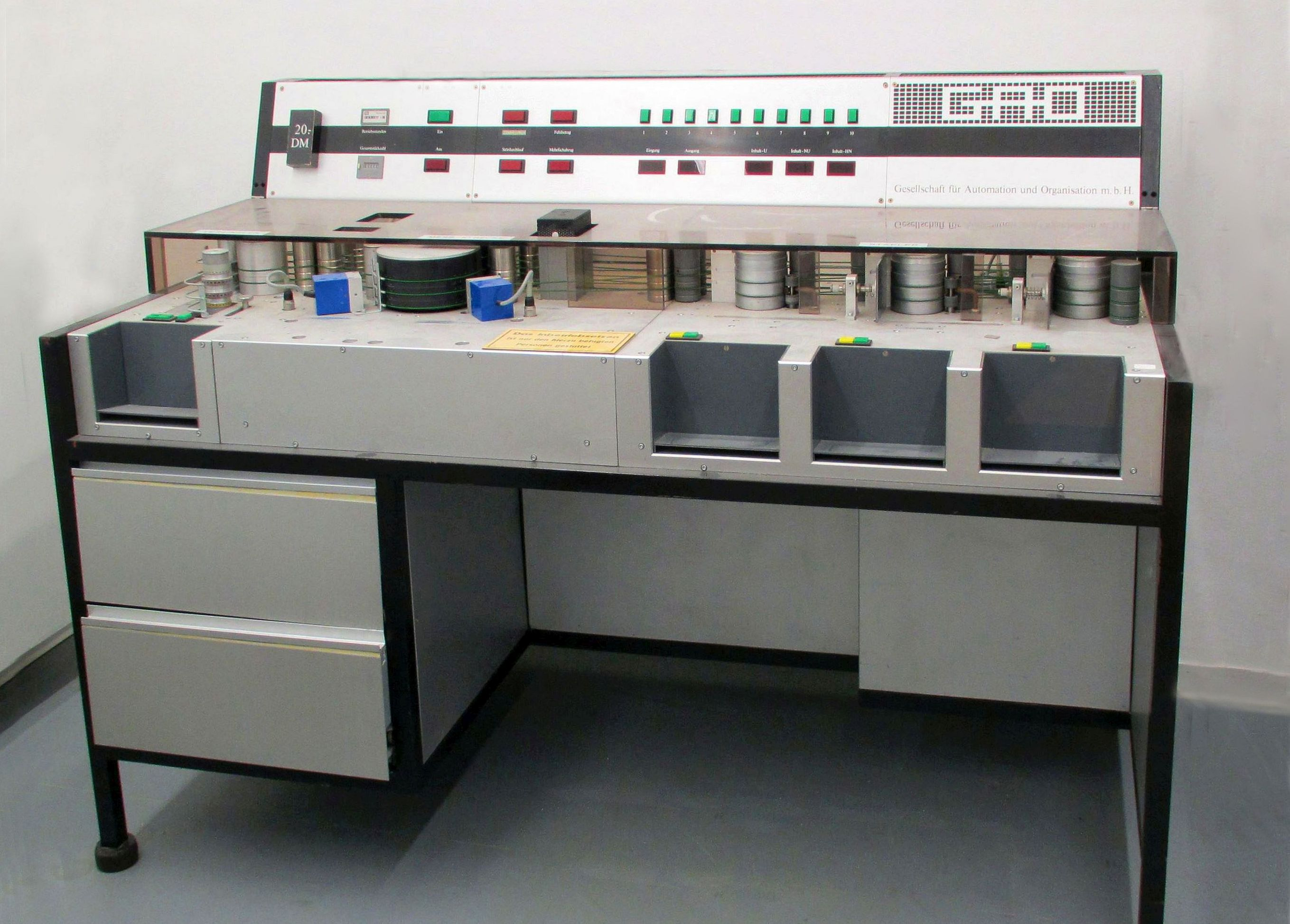
Functional prototype of Giesecke & Devrient's first banknote processing system ISS 300 (1974)

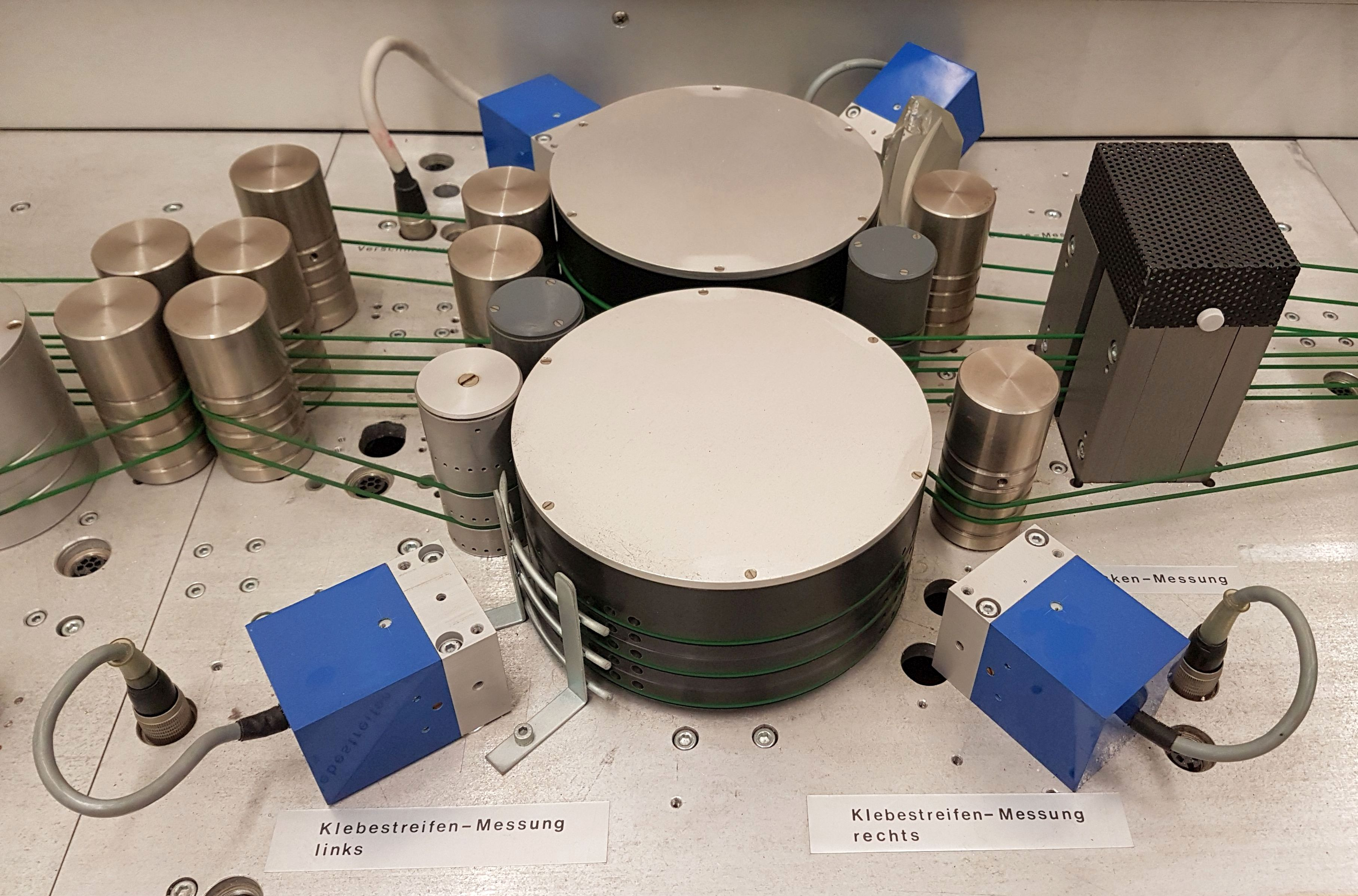
Sensor section of ISS 300 prototype (1974)

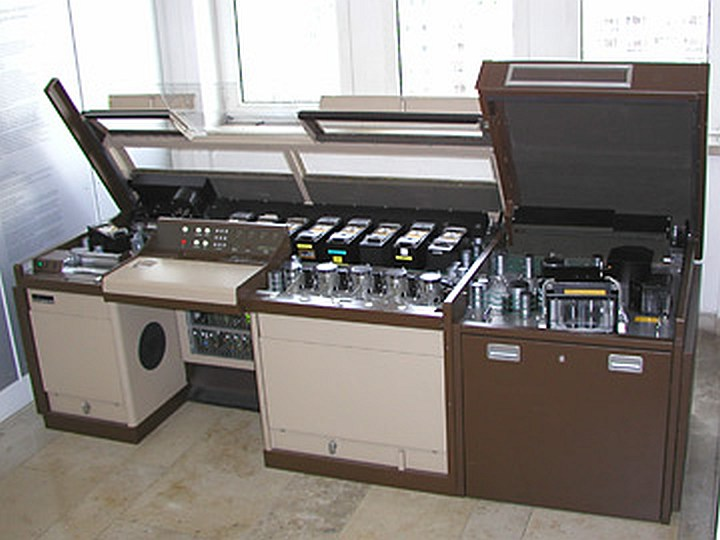
Banknote Processing System ISS 300PS exhibited at Deutsches Museum, Munich (1986)

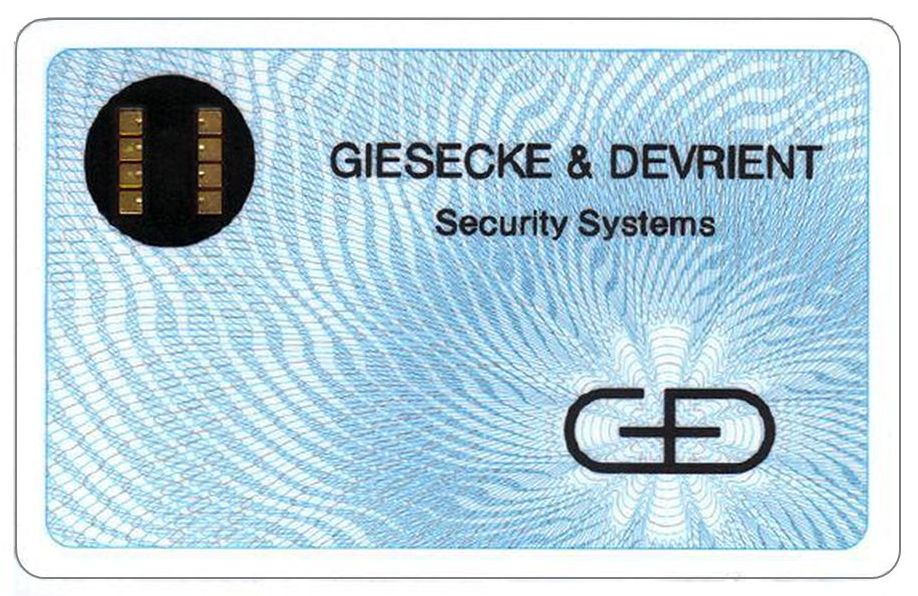
First smart card manufactured by Giesecke & Devrient in 1979

== Publications ==
- Gröttrup, Helmut. "Aus den Arbeiten des deutschen Raketenkollektivs in der Sowjet-Union" [From the work of the German rocket collective in the Soviet Union] (PDF). Raketentechnik und Raumfahrtforschung (in German). 1958 (2). Deutsche Gesellschaft für Raketentechnik und Raumfahrt (DGRR): 58–62.
- Gröttrup, Helmut (1959). Über Raketen. Eine allgemeinverständliche Einführung in Physik und Technik der Rakete [About rockets - General introduction to the physics and technology of rockets] (in German). Berlin: Ullstein.
- Gröttrup, Irmgard (1959). Die Besessenen und die Mächtigen. Im Schatten der roten Rakete [Rocket Wife. An Account of the Enforced Sojourn in Russia of German Rocket Scientists' Families]. Translated by Hughes, Susi. London: André Deutsch. ASIN B0000CKD8Y.
- Gröttrup, Helmut (1968). Die automatisierte Entscheidung. Aspekte der Automatisierung von Verwaltungsvorgängen [The automated decision. Aspects of the automation of administrative processes]. Studium Generale (in German). Vol. 21. Berlin: Springer. pp. 1107–1129.

== See also ==
- Space Race
