= Solnechny, Tver Oblast =

Closed urban-type settlement in Tver Oblast, Russia

Solnechny Солнечный
- Urban-type settlement
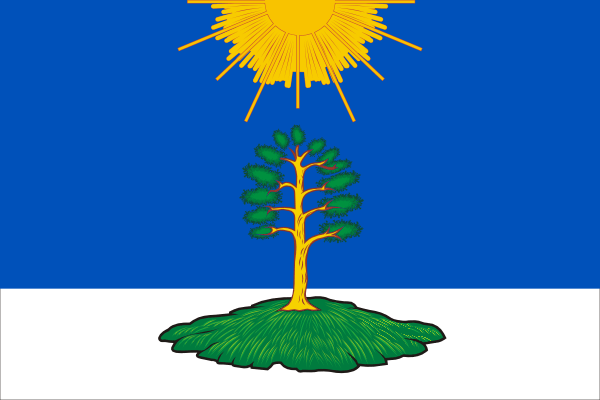
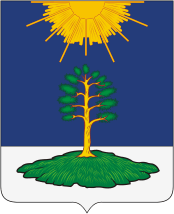
- Flag Coat of arms
- Interactive map of Solnechny
- Location of Solnechny Solnechny (Tver Oblast)
- Coordinates: 57°12′N 33°03′E
- Country: Russia
- Federal subject: Tver Oblast

Population (2010 Census)
  - Total: 2,242
  - Estimate (2021): 1,840 (−17.9%)

Administrative status
  - Subordinated to: Solnechny Okrug
  - Capital of: Solnechny Okrug

Municipal status
  - Urban okrug: Solnechny Urban Okrug
  - Capital of: Solnechny Urban Okrug
- Time zone: UTC+3 (MSK)
- OKTMO ID: 28756000051
- Website: www.zatosoln.ru

Solnechny (Russian: Со́лнечный) is a closed urban locality (an urban-type settlement) in Tver Oblast, Russia, located on Gorodomlya Island on Lake Seliger. Population: 2,242 (2010 census); 2,108 (2002 census).

== Administrative and municipal status ==
Within the framework of administrative divisions, it is incorporated as Solnechny Okrug—an administrative unit with the status equal to that of the districts. As a municipal division, Solnechny Okrug is incorporated as Solnechny Urban Okrug.
