= Tenovis =

German telecommunications company

Coordinates: 50°05′50″N 8°37′47″E

- Formerly: Deutsche Privat Telephon Gesellschaft; Telefonbau und Normalzeit (T&N); Telenorma; Bosch Telecom
- Type: Public (until 2004); Subsidiary of Avaya (2004–)
- Industry: Telecommunications
- Predecessor: Friedrich Merk Telefonbau
- Founded: 1899
- Defunct: 2004
- Fate: Acquired by Avaya in 2004
- Headquarters: Frankfurt am Main, Germany
- Area served: Austria, Belgium, France, Italy, Spain, Switzerland, Netherlands
- Products: Communication solutions (PBX, call centers, CRM, voice messaging, backup centers)
- Number of employees: 5,400
- Parent: Avaya

Tenovis (formerly Deutsche Privat Telephon Gesellschaft, Telefonbau und Normalzeit, T&N, Telenorma and Bosch Telecom) was a large German telecommunications company first set up in 1899, who were acquired by Avaya in October 2004. The business has a staff force of more than 5,400 employees and maintains a presence in Austria, Belgium, France, Italy, Spain, Switzerland and the Netherlands. Tenovis announced its IPO in April 2004. Tenovis has its head office situated in Frankfurt/Main, its main 'Product portfolio' consists of communication solutions, among them being: Private branch exchange, call center, business recovery center (backup computer centers), customer relationship management, voice messaging, cross-linking and services for enterprises and national authorities. The Support leg of the enterprise is a well-developed telephone system of small and medium size subsidiaries.
