= Gorodomlya Island =

Island in Lake Seliger, Tver Oblast, Russia

Coordinates: 57°12′8″N 33°04′2″E

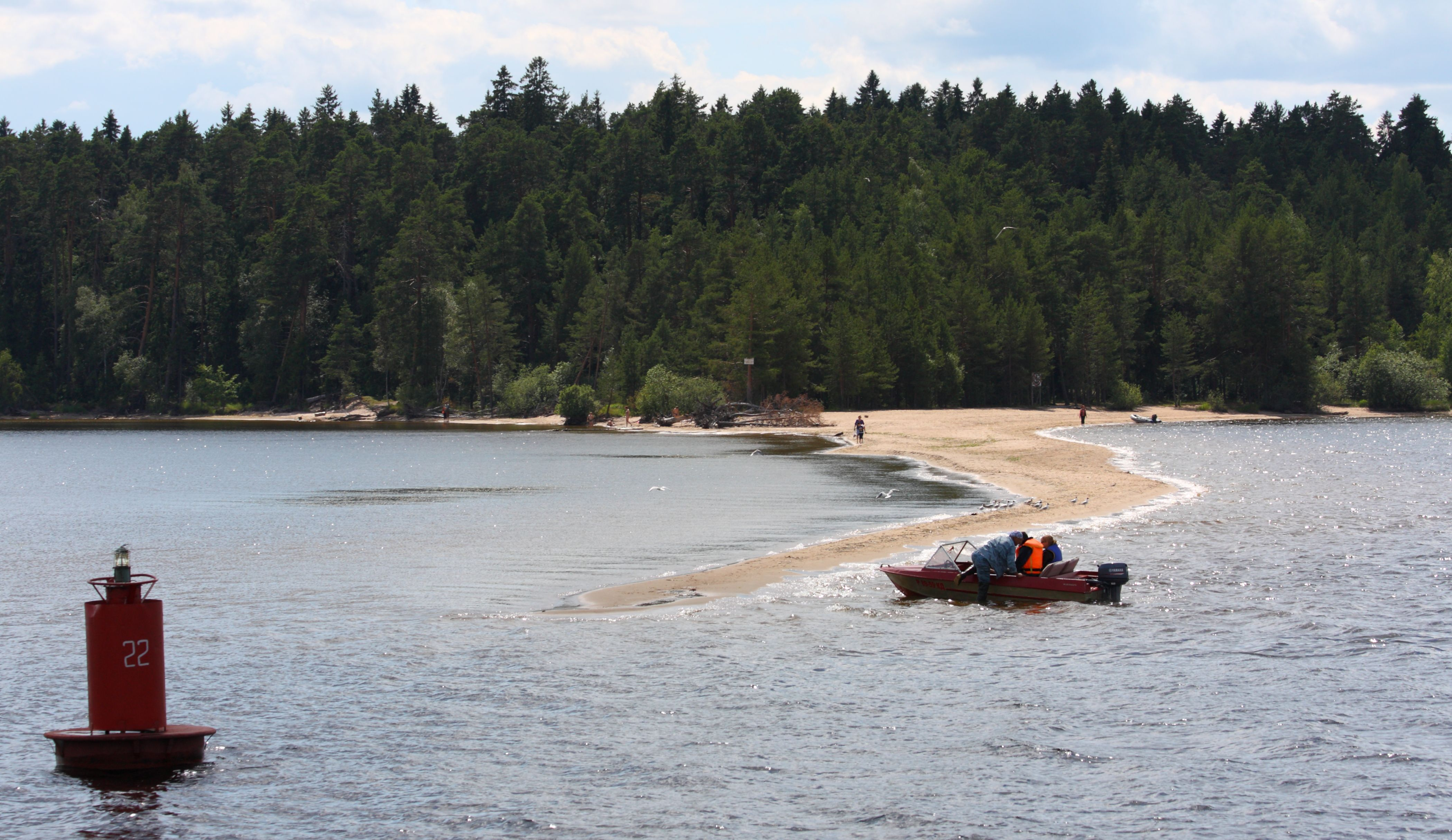
View of Gorodomlya Island in Lake Seliger

Gorodomlya Island (Russian: остров Городомля, romanized: ostrov Gorodomlya) is located on Lake Seliger in Tver Oblast, Russia, 300 kilometres (200 mi) northwest of Moscow. The closed urban-type settlement of Solnechny is located on the island.

== History ==
In June 1930, the People's Commissariat of Agriculture (Narkomzem) began construction on Gorodomlya Island of the Scientific-Research Institute for the Study of Foot-and-Mouth Disease. It was opened officially in October 1932 and incorporated the very best Soviet and imported equipment and its huge main building, occupying 25,000 square metres, incorporated both production facilities and research laboratories, a guinea pig nursery, biological wastewater treatment facilities, a museum, a library, a micro-photo laboratory, a cinema and a 100-seat lecture room. In 1934–1935, the FMD facility was transferred to the Red Army's BW facility, the Biotechnical Institute, also known by the code designation V/2-1094. German intelligence reported that the military institute was engaged in experiments focused on Francisella tularensis (the causative agent of tularaemia) and Yersinia pestis (the causative agent of plague). Germany launched Operation Barbarossa in June 1941 and following the capture of Kalinin in October, the BW facility was evacuated from the island and eventually relocated to Kirov. The facilities served as a convalescent hospital in the following years.

In 1946, more than 170 German rocket scientists and engineers, including Helmut Gröttrup and Fritz Karl Preikschat, were brought to the island to work on the Soviet space program. At this time, the facilities were in severe disrepair due to wartime destruction and lacking electricity as well as running water. Over the following months, living conditions gradually improved and by the end of 1947 the problem with the water supply had been resolved. The German colony at Gorodomlya was designated as Branch 1 of research bureau NII-88. The bureau participated in the continued development of the V-2 as well as the design of the R-1 rocket, a version of the V-2 manufactured with Russian parts. In June 1952, 100 German scientists were repatriated and sent home. Branch 1 of NII-88 eventually became a part of the Zvezda Branch of the Academician Pilyugin Center, a subsidiary of Roscosmos.
