= Space Race (TV series) =

- BBC DVD Cover
- Genre: Docudrama
- Written by: Christopher Spencer
- Directed by: Christopher Spencer; Mark Everest
- Starring: Richard Dillane; John Warnaby; Ravil Isyanov
- Narrated by: Robert Lindsay
- Composers: Samuel Sim; Ty Unwin
- Country of origin: United Kingdom
- Original language: English
- No. of series: 1
- No. of episodes: 4

Production
- Executive producer: Jill Fullerton-Smith
- Producers: Deborah Cadbury (Series Producer); Jules Hussey; Victoria Gregory; Sias Wilson
- Running time: 240 minutes

Original release
- Network: BBC Two
- Release: 14 September – 5 October 2005

Related
- Nuclear Secrets

Space Race is a BBC docudrama series first shown in Britain on BBC2 between 14 September and 5 October 2005, chronicling the major events and characters in the American/Soviet space race up to the first landing of a man on the Moon. It focuses on Sergei Korolev, the Soviet chief rocket designer, and Wernher von Braun, his American counterpart. The series was a joint effort between British, German, American and Russian production teams.

== Reception ==
=== Awards ===
- Royal Television Society 2006
  - Nominated: RTS Television Award for Best Production Design (Drama): Alan Spalding
- Sir Arthur Clarke Award 2006
  - Won: Sir Arthur Clarke Award for Best Presentation (TV & Radio)

== Episodes ==
=== Episode 1: "Race For Rockets" (1944–1949) ===
The results of Wernher von Braun's work on the V-2 for the Nazis at Mittelwerk and Peenemünde is shown, and his final activities within Germany during the last years of the Second World War, as both American and Soviet forces race to capture German rocket technology. However, when the Americans gain the upper hand by recovering von Braun and most of his senior staff, along with all their technical documents and much other materiel. Sergei Korolev's is released from the Gulag to act as the Soviets' rocketry expert alongside former colleague Valentin Glushko, and how he is set to work bringing Soviet rocket technology up to date with that of von Braun, working with what material and personnel are left after von Braun's escape to the US.

=== Episode 2: "Race For Satellites" (1953–1958) ===
As the Cold War intensifies, Korolev is asked to build a rocket capable of carrying a five-ton warhead to America; he designs and constructs the R-7 Semyorka, the first ICBM, and is later allowed to use it to launch the first satellite, Sputnik 1, quickly following up with the rushed Sputnik 2. Meanwhile, von Braun struggles to persuade the US government to allow him to launch his own satellite; after Sputnik's launch and the failure of the US Navy to launch a Vanguard satellite, he is finally allowed to launch the first American satellite, Explorer 1. Korolev announces that the Americans have evened the score and that they are in a space race, which they intend to win. At the end of the episode, two men are shown walking down a corridor, one of them wearing a spacesuit.

=== Episode 3: "Race For Survival" (1959–1961) ===
Both the Americans and Soviets are planning crewed space flights, and we see both sides preparing to do so with the development of the Vostok programme (USSR) and Project Mercury (USA). As well as basic details about the capsules and their delivery vehicles, we also see some of the selection and training of the Russian cosmonauts, and rather less of that of their counterparts in the US. After difficulties and failures on both sides, including a side story about a catastrophic failure of one of the first Russian ballistic missiles, the Soviets succeed in putting Yuri Gagarin into space first, with the Americans putting Alan Shepard up shortly afterwards.

=== Episode 4: "Race for the Moon" (1964–1969) ===
Both countries now plan to put a man on the Moon; the Americans pull ahead in the space race with Project Gemini, but then suffer a disaster with the Apollo 1 fire. Meanwhile, despite a notable successes such as the first space walk by Alexei Leonov, the Soviet space programme struggles to keep up amid internal strife. Glushko and Korolev permanently fall out in an argument about fuel; Korolev turns to Nikolai Kuznetsov to develop engines instead. Kuznetsov delivers the NK-33, very efficient but much less powerful than the Americans' F-1. The Soviet program suffers further blows when Korolev dies during surgery, Gagarin dies in a jet crash, Soyuz 1 crashes and kills Vladimir Komarov, and the prototype booster for the Moon shot, the N-1 rocket, fails to successfully launch. In America, von Braun has continuing difficulties with the Saturn V, especially combustion instability in the large F-1 engine, but these are ultimately overcome almost by brute force at great expense, and the rocket successfully launches the first crewed lunar mission, Apollo 8, and the first crewed lunar landing, Apollo 11. The final episode finishes with brief text summaries of the remaining careers of the various people involved.

== Production details ==
The BBC filmed Space Race in and around the town of Sibiu, Transylvania in Romania. Romania has signed the EU co-production treaty which allows for EU co-productions. Compared to other locations, Romania attracted the BBC with unspoiled natural locations, experienced crews and moderately priced production facilities.

The series was filmed with the Panasonic SDX 900 DVCPro50 professional camcorder. This allowed keeping to the speedy shooting schedule and provided the 'gritty' look appropriate to the time period. Shot in widescreen 25fps progressive mode, the series deliver rich, filmic feel, which compares favourably with high definition.

=== Cast ===
- Richard Dillane – Wernher von Braun
- Steve Nicolson – Sergei Korolev
- John Warnaby – Vasily Mishin
- Ravil Isyanov – Valentin Glushko
- Rupert Wickham – Kurt H. Debus
- Tim Woodward – Marshal Mitrofan Nedelin
- Eric Loren – Castenholz
- Chris Robson – Dieter Huzel
- Mark Dexter – Staver
- Oliver de la Fosse – Staver's Lieutenant
- Vitalie Ursu – Yuri Gagarin
- Oleg Stefan – Alexei Leonov
- Mariya Mironova – Nina
- Jeffry Wickham – Nikolai Kuznetsov
- Robert Jezek – Robert R. Gilruth
- Robert Lindsay – Narrator
- Stuart Bunce – Lev Gaidukov
- David Barrass – Helmut Gröttrup
- Constantine Gregory – Nikita Khrushchev
- Simon Day – Kammler
- Nicholas Rowe – R. V. Jones
- Mikhail Gorevoy – Ivan Serov
- Stephen Greif – Colonel Holger Toftoy
- Anna Barkan – Ksenia Koroleva
- Max Bollinger – Russian cosmonaut (VO)
- Todd Boyce – Alan Shepard
- Emil Măndănac – Viacheslav Lapo, Russian sound technician
- Mihai Dinvale – German Scientist
- Anthony Edridge – Chris Kraft

== Inaccuracies and errors ==
Most of the historical and technological data presented in the series are heavily simplified, and sometimes contain outright untruths or errors. The series would best be described and interpreted as giving a general impression of the subject matter, rather than rigorous factual account.

=== Factual errors ===
- An early scene shows Serov executing Polish resistance fighters who discovered a V-2. This did not happen. A team of British and Polish soldiers and scientists formed a mission to retrieve a fallen V-2 near the Blizna V-2 missile launch site in Poland.
- Footage showing early rocket club activity of von Braun actually shows Reinhold Tiling's rockets, a rival to the VfR club that von Braun belonged to. The VfR rockets were crude engines attached to sticks.
- Key figures are missing from the presented history. Andrei Tupolev, Vladimir Chelomei and Mikhail Yangel are also conspicuously absent, for example, even in the sequence depicting the disastrous explosion of Yangel's prototype R-16 ICBM. In the series, Glushko is generally identified with all rocket projects competing with Korolev within the USSR, even those for which he had only partial responsibility or was a subcontractor.
- The narrator said twice that the Mercury-Redstone could put an astronaut into orbit. In reality, the best the Redstone rocket could do was put an astronaut into a 15-minute "suborbital" ballistic trajectory, which peaked out around 120 miles up. The first orbital flight of an American astronaut did not occur until 20 February 1962, when the Mercury capsule was put into orbit with a more powerful Atlas rocket. Indeed, NASA report TMX-53107 called Mercury-Redstone "a prelude to an orbital flight program" (pg 1–2). However, Episode 3, "Race for Survival", is at pains to disclaim orbital capability. The narrator says (from 8'46" to 8' 51") only that the V-derived Redstone "has only a tenth of the power of Korolev's rocket. Barely enough to put a man into space." This of course is why Freedom 7, Alan Shepard's Redstone-launched capsule, was suborbital.
- The narrator states that Gagarin flies "over a sleeping America" even though Vostok's flightpath did not take the craft anywhere near North America, except the Aleutian Islands. Gagarin did say "I'm over America", though. America includes South America and Vostok 1's flight path did just touch America in that sense. Gagarin spoke at night, while still over the Pacific, but only three minutes from the Straits of Magellan; a little earlier he was near Hawaii, which had become one of the US less than two years earlier.
- Episode 1 features a map of Europe with wrongly indicated countries. Switzerland is labeled Austria, Austria is labelled Yugoslavia and the Czech Republic is labelled Hungary.
- Episode 1 features the surrender of Wernher von Braun to the Americans; at that time, he had a badly fractured arm, which was not mentioned in the series.
- In Episode 2 the narrator states twice that the R-7 rocket has 32 engines. This is not entirely correct. The R-7 and its successors have four side boosters and a core booster. Each side booster has a single rocket engine with four combustion chambers, two vernier combustion chambers, and one set of turbopumps. The central core has a similar engine but with four vernier combustion chambers instead of two. This makes total of 32 chambers, not engines. In the scene where Glushko is supposedly testing the clustering scheme, only one engine is shown.
- One of the cosmonauts, after seeing the Vostok's cockpit for the first time (Episode 3), asks where the controls are. Also the Gagarin flight scene indicates that there were no controls inside. In fact controls were present on board the Vostoks, but they were blocked to prevent the cosmonauts from manipulating them. A set of codes was placed aboard, so that the cosmonaut could unlock the controls if necessary.
- When the Mission Control is shown for the first time in Episode 3 it shows that all the flight controllers have a TV screen showing the launch pad. In reality only the flight director had a TV screen. The other consoles had only meters to measure the various systems.
- In Episode 4 the narrator states that "if they (Apollo 8) fail to lock into the Moon's orbit they will fly on, forever lost in space". In fact, Apollo 8 used a free return trajectory that would have taken them back to Earth had the engine performing lunar orbit injection failed.

=== Unconfirmed statements ===
The series repeats the claim Korolev was denounced by Glushko several times. There are no known documents substantiating this statement. Glushko had been imprisoned himself before Korolev was arrested and had been sentenced to eight years in a prison camp "for participating in sabotage organization". He was retained to work for the NKVD to develop aircraft jet boosters. In 1942, at Glushko's request, NKVD transferred Korolev from another prison to Glushko's OKB.

=== Filming inaccuracies ===
- American soldier who meet Von Braun carry a SKS carbine instead of the standard US M1 Rifle or M1 Carbine.
- Usage of period footage is inconsistent, in particular with regard to the R-7 and its variants.
- The scene that depicts transporting a V-2 missile to firing position uses a different missile pulled by the Soviet ZIL-157 truck.
- In the sequence with the train leaving the German station with scientists one can read "CFR" on the locomotive, which stands for Căile Ferate Române (Romanian Railways).
- The scene depicting a launch from Kapustin Yar, which is dated by 1948, includes vehicles that were not produced at that time, in particular the ZIL-157 (1958), the ZIL-131 (1967) and the UAZ-469 (1971).

=== Notes ===
- While Korolev's last name often appears to be mispronounced as "Korolyov" in the film, this is closer to its pronunciation in the Russian language.
- While both Glushko and Korolev were civilian engineers, they were correctly depicted as wearing military uniform during their stay in Germany, as both had been given commissions in the Red Army.

== Companion book ==
A companion book to the series was written by Deborah Cadbury.

=== Selected editions ===
- Cadbury, Deborah (5 September 2005). Space Race. Fourth Estate (hardcover). ISBN 978-0-00-720995-8.
- Cadbury, Deborah (7 August 2006). The Space Race: The Battle to Rule the Heavens. HarperPerennial (paperback). ISBN 978-0-00-720994-1.

== Notes ==
- The National Geographic Channel broadcast the series as a two-part mini-series in 2006.

== See also ==
- From the Earth to the Moon
- When We Left Earth: The NASA Missions
- Apollo 11 in popular culture
