= Borisoglebsk =

Town in Voronezh Oblast, Russia

Borisoglebsk Борисоглебск
- Town
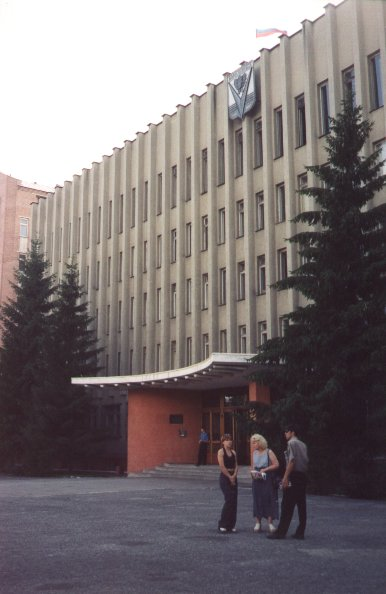
- Borisoglebsk Town Administration building

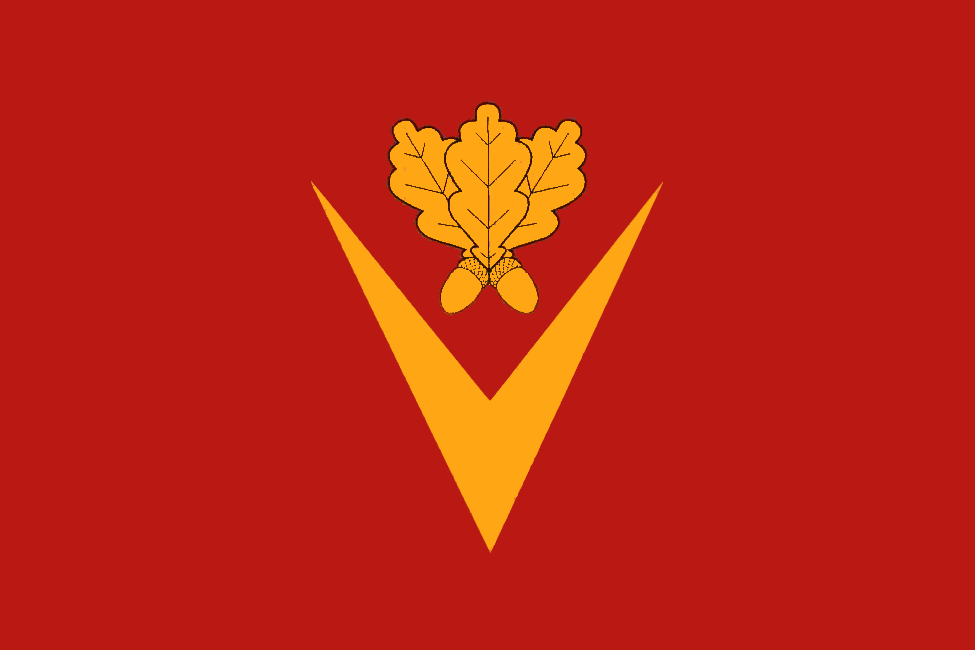
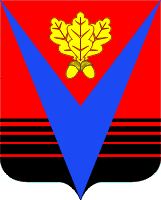
- Flag Coat of arms
- Interactive map of Borisoglebsk
- Location of Borisoglebsk Borisoglebsk (Voronezh Oblast)
- Coordinates: 51°22′N 42°05′E
- Country: Russia
- Federal subject: Voronezh Oblast
- Founded: 1646

Government
  - Head: Alexey Kabargin
- Elevation: 100 m (330 ft)

Population (2010 Census)
  - Total: 65,585
  - Estimate (2025): 57,682 (−12.1%)
  - Rank: 240th in 2010

Administrative status
  - Subordinated to: Borisoglebsky Urban Okrug
  - Capital of: Borisoglebsky Urban Okrug

Municipal status
  - Urban okrug: Borisoglebsky Urban Okrug
  - Capital of: Borisoglebsky Urban Okrug
- Time zone: UTC+3 (MSK)
- Postal codes: 397160, 397163–397167, 397170–397172, 397189
- Dialing code: +7 47354
- OKTMO ID: 20710000001
- Website: web.archive.org/web/20130208022734/http://adminborisoglebsk.e-gov36.ru/

Borisoglebsk (Russian: Борисогле́бск) is a town in Voronezh Oblast, Russia, located on the left bank of the Vorona River near its confluence with the Khopyor. Population: 60,687 (2021 census); 65,585 (2010 census); 69,392 (2002 census); 72,338 (1989 Soviet census); 65,000 (1969).

Historical population
Year	Pop.	±%
1897	22,300	—
1926	39,100	+75.3%
1939	52,900	+35.3%
1959	54,415	+2.9%
1970	63,733	+17.1%
1979	67,621	+6.1%
1989	72,338	+7.0%
2002	69,392	−4.1%
2010	65,585	−5.5%
2021	60,687	−7.5%
Source: Census data

== History ==
Borisoglebsk was founded in 1646 and was named for the Russian saints Boris and Gleb, the first saints canonized in Kievan Rus' after the Christianization of the country.

In the late 19th century and the early 20th century Borisoglebsk developed into a busy inland port due to its geographic location within the highly fertile Central Black Earth Region. Barges transported good such as grain, timber, kerosene, fish, eggs, watermelon from the region to large cities in western and central Russia connected to Borisoglebsk by waterways such as St. Petersburg, Moscow, Rostov, Taganrog, and Tsaritsyn. In 1870, a brewer plant opened in the town, producing dark beer and light beer, as well as fruit soda. The brewery has survived and continues to produce beer. According to the 1885 census, the population of Borisoglebsk featured 13,007 inhabitants (6,325 males and 6,682 females), almost exclusively Russian Orthodox. In the early 20th century there was a mixed-sex gymnasium in the town, with 4 female classes and 6 male classes, and a technical railway school.

In January 1906, revolutionary Maria Spiridonova assassinated G. N. Luzhenovsky at the Borisoglebsk railway station. After the Bolsheviks came to power in Borisoglebsk in 1918, one of the first concentration camps in Russia for "alien and petty-bourgeois elements" was organized in the town. In December 1922, the 2nd Military School Red Air Force pilots Borisoglebsk was created which became later, the renowned Borisoglebsk Higher Military Aviation School of Pilots "Order of the Red Banner" "Lenin" "Chkalov".

== Administrative and municipal status ==
Within the framework of administrative divisions, it is, together with twenty-four rural localities, incorporated as Borisoglebsky Urban Okrug—an administrative unit with the status equal to that of the districts. As a municipal division, this administrative unit also has urban okrug status.

== Military ==
The town is host to Borisoglebsk air base.

== Notable people ==
- Ivan Fioletov, Bolshevik revolutionary and one of the 26 Baku Commissars.
- Aleksandr Kots (1880–1964), zoologist
- Mitrofan Nedelin, military commander and Chief Marshal of the Artillery, namesake of the Nedelin catastrophe.

== Twin town ==
- Delmenhorst, Germany
- Blansko, Czech Republic
