= Hypergolic propellant =

Type of rocket engine fuel

A 1958 NASA experiment showing an ampoule of dinitrogen tetroxide being broken open, after which hydrazine is sprayed onto it from a syringe, causing spontaneous ignition

A hypergolic propellant is a rocket propellant whose components spontaneously ignite upon contact with one another. In contemporary usage, the term typically refers to the combination of dinitrogen tetroxide (an oxidizer) and one of the various forms of hydrazine (a fuel).

Advantages of hypergolic propellants include their ability to be stored at room temperature and their ability to be reliably and repeatedly ignited without a separate ignition system. Unlike many liquid-fueled rockets that use cryogenic fuels or oxidizers stored at very low temperatures, hypergolic propellants can remain loaded in a vehicle for extended periods before launch. These characteristics led to their use in early intercontinental ballistic missiles and in upper stages of launch vehicles that require multiple engine restarts. However, hypergolic propellants are difficult to handle because of their high toxicity and corrosiveness. In later decades, many ICBMs transitioned to advanced solid-propellant rocket motors.

== History ==
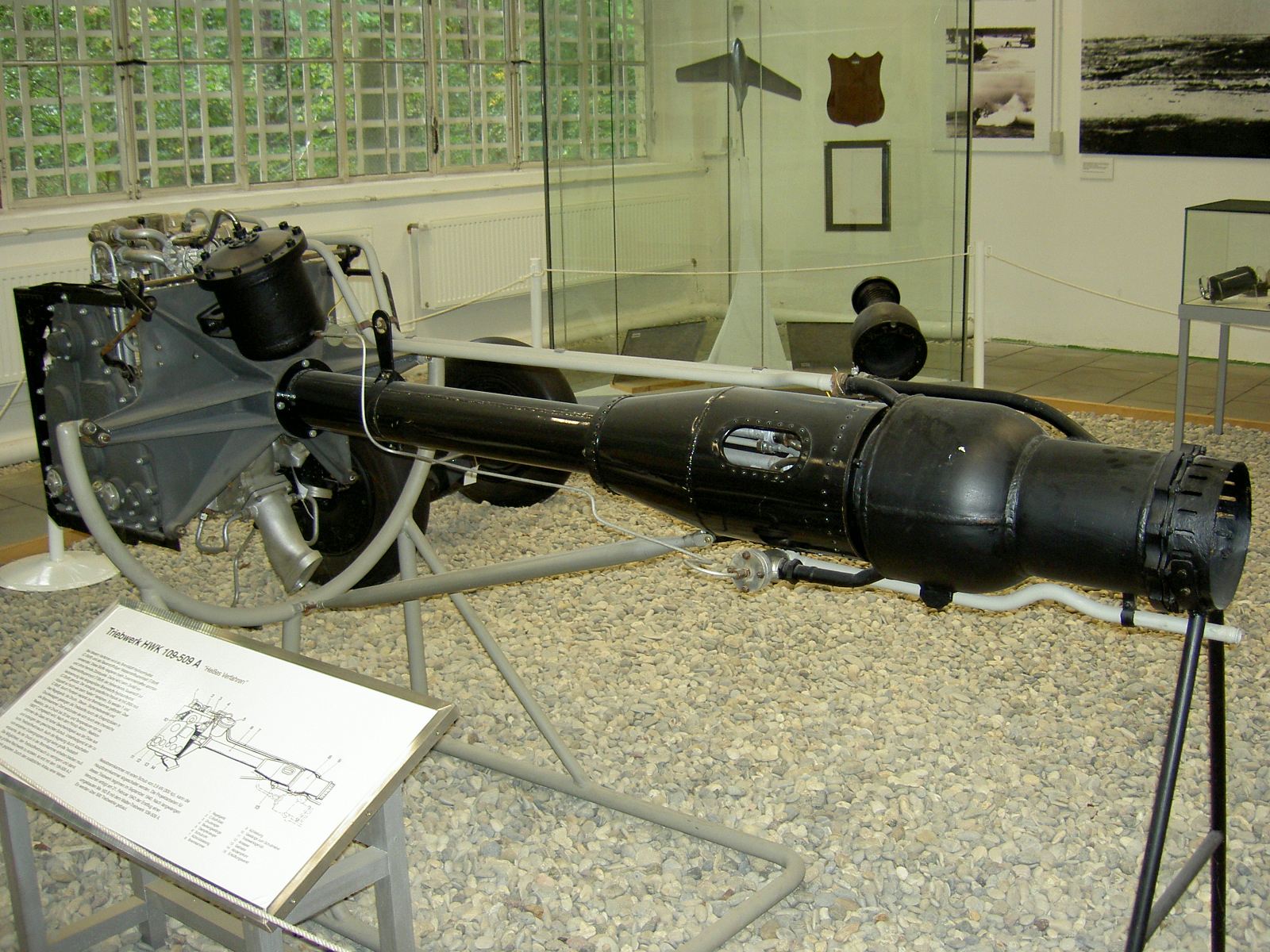
The Walter 109-509A hypergolic-propellant rocket engine of 1942–45

The fact that turpentine may spontaneously combust when mixed with nitric acid was discovered in the late 17th century by Frederick Slare, but it remained a scientific curiosity for centuries until it was proposed to use it for rocket-assisted take off during WWII.

In 1935, Hellmuth Walter discovered that hydrazine hydrate was hypergolic with high-test peroxide of 80–83%. He was probably the first to discover this phenomenon, and set to work developing a fuel. Prof. Otto Lutz assisted the Walter Company with the development of C-Stoff, which contained 30% hydrazine hydrate, 57% methanol, and 13% water, and spontaneously ignited with high-strength hydrogen peroxide. BMW developed engines burning a hypergolic mix of nitric acid with various combinations of amines, xylidines, and anilines.

Hypergolic propellants were discovered independently, for the second time, in the U.S. by GALCIT and Navy Annapolis researchers in 1940. They developed engines powered by aniline and red fuming nitric acid. Robert Goddard, Reaction Motors, and Curtiss-Wright worked on aniline/nitric acid engines in the early 1940s, for small missiles and jet assisted take-off (JATO). The project resulted in the successful JATO of several Martin PBM and PBY bombers, but the project was disliked because of the toxic properties of both fuel and oxidizer, as well as the high freezing point of aniline (−6.3 °C). The second problem was eventually solved by the addition of small quantities of furfuryl alcohol to the aniline.

In Germany from the mid-1930s through World War II, rocket propellants were broadly classed as monergols, hypergols, nonhypergols and lithergols. The ending ergol is a combination of Greek ergon or work, and Latin oleum or oil, later influenced by the chemical suffix -ol from alcohol. (Note: "-ergol", Oxford English Dictionary) Monergols were monopropellants, while nonhypergols were bipropellants that required external ignition, and lithergols were solid/liquid hybrids. Hypergolic propellants (or at least hypergolic ignition) were far less prone to hard starts than electric or pyrotechnic ignition. The "hypergole" terminology was coined by Dr. Wolfgang Nöggerath, at the Technical University of Braunschweig (Brunswick), Germany.

Common hypergolic propellants

The only rocket-powered fighter ever deployed was the Messerschmitt Me 163B Komet, which had an HWK 109-509, a rocket motor which consumed methanol/hydrazine as fuel and high-test peroxide T-Stoff as oxidizer. The hypergolic rocket motor had the advantage of fast climb and quick-hitting tactics at the cost of being very volatile and capable of exploding with any degree of inattention. Other proposed combat rocket fighters such as the Heinkel Julia and reconnaissance aircraft like the DFS 228 were meant to use the Walter 509 series of rocket motors, but besides the Me 163, only the Bachem Ba 349 Natter vertical launch expendable fighter was ever flight-tested with the Walter rocket propulsion system as its primary sustaining thrust system for military-purpose aircraft.

The earliest ballistic missiles, such as the Soviet R-7 that launched Sputnik 1 and the U.S. Atlas and Titan-1, used kerosene and liquid oxygen. Although they are preferred in space launchers, the difficulties of storing a cryogen such as liquid oxygen in a missile that had to be kept launch ready for months or years at a time led to a switch to hypergolic propellants in the U.S. Titan II and in most Soviet ICBMs such as the R-36, but the difficulties of such corrosive and toxic materials, including injury-causing leaks and the explosion of a Titan-II in its silo, led to their near universal replacement with solid-fuel boosters, first in Western submarine-launched ballistic missiles and then in land-based U.S. and Soviet ICBMs.

Toxic Propellant Hazards (1958) NASA training film

In the 1960s, late variants of French Véronique sounding rocket and the Vesta rocket, as well as the first stage of the first orbital SLV Diamant used the combination of nitric acid and turpentine discovered by Slare. It may also be used in amateur rocketry.

The Apollo Lunar Module, used in the Moon landings, employed hypergolic fuels in both the descent and ascent rocket engines. The Apollo spacecraft used the same combination for the Service Propulsion System. Those spacecraft and the Space Shuttle (among others) used hypergolic propellants for their reaction control systems.

The trend among Western space-launch agencies is away from large hypergolic rocket engines and toward hydrogen/oxygen engines or methane/oxygen and RP-1/oxygen engines for various advantages and disadvantages. Arianes 1 through 4, with their hypergolic first and second stages (and optional hypergolic boosters on the Ariane 3 and 4) have been retired and replaced with the Ariane 5, which uses a first stage fueled by liquid hydrogen and liquid oxygen. The Titan II, III, and IV, with their hypergolic first and second stages, have also been retired for the Atlas V (RP-1/oxygen) and Delta IV (hydrogen/oxygen). Hypergolic propellants are still used in upper stages, when multiple burn-coast periods are required, and in launch escape systems.

== Characteristics ==
=== Advantages ===
Orange-brown smoke typical of dinitrogen tetroxide

Hypergolically fueled rocket engines are usually simple and reliable because they need no ignition system. Although larger hypergolic engines in some launch vehicles use turbopumps, most hypergolic engines are pressure fed. A gas, usually helium, is fed to the propellant tanks under pressure through a series of check and safety valves. The propellants, in turn, flow through control valves into the combustion chamber; there, their instant contact ignition prevents a mixture of unreacted propellants from accumulating and then igniting in a potentially catastrophic hard start.

As hypergolic rockets do not need an ignition system, they can fire any number of times by opening and closing the propellant valves until the propellants are exhausted, so are suited for spacecraft maneuvering and well-suited, though not uniquely so, as upper stages of such space launchers as the Delta II and Ariane 5, which must perform more than one burn. Restartable nonhypergolic rocket engines nevertheless exist, notably the cryogenic (oxygen/hydrogen) RL10 on the Centaur and the J-2 on the Saturn V. The RP-1/LOX Merlin on the Falcon 9 and the LH_{2}/LOX Vinci on the Ariane 6 can also be restarted.

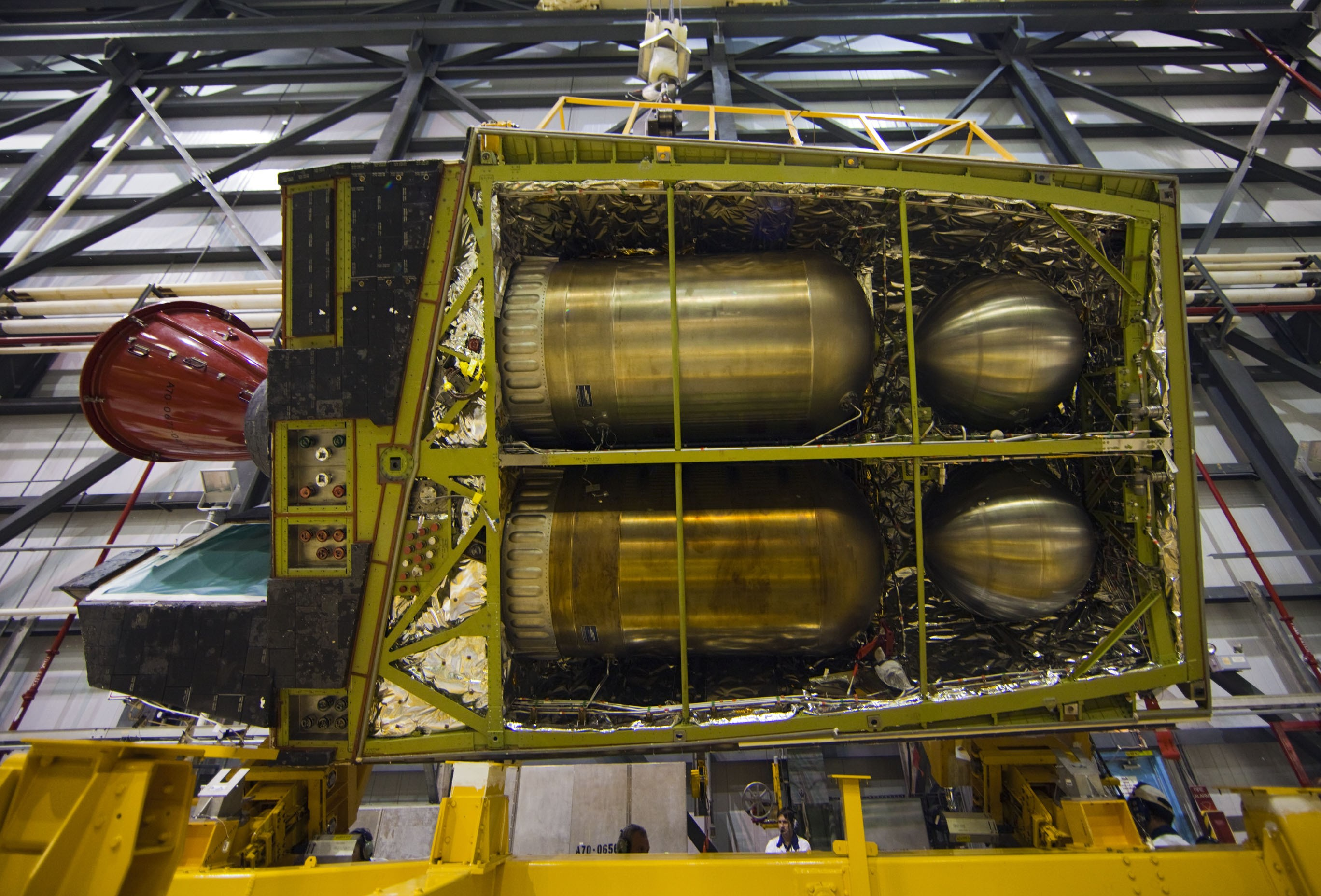
Hypergolic propellant tanks of the Space Shuttle Endeavour's Orbital Maneuvering System

The most common hypergolic fuels, hydrazine, monomethylhydrazine, and unsymmetrical dimethylhydrazine (UDMH), and oxidizer, nitrogen tetroxide, are all liquid at ordinary temperatures and pressures. They are therefore sometimes called "storable liquid propellants". They are suitable for use in spacecraft missions lasting many years. The cryogenity of liquid hydrogen and liquid oxygen has so far limited their practical use to space launch vehicles where they need to be stored only briefly. The largest issue with the usage of cryogenic propellants in interplanetary space is boil-off, which is largely dependent on the scale of spacecraft.

Another advantage of hypergolic propellants is their high density compared to cryogenic propellants. LO_{2} has a density of 1.14 g/ml, while hypergolic oxidizers such as nitric acid or nitrogen tetroxide have a density of 1.55 g/ml and 1.45 g/ml, respectively. LH_{2} fuel offers extremely high performance, yet its density only warrants its use in the largest of rocket stages, while mixtures of hydrazine and UDMH have a density at least 10 times greater. This is of great importance in space probes, as the higher propellant density allows the size of their propellant tanks to be reduced significantly, which in turn allows the probes to fit within a smaller payload fairing.

=== Disadvantages ===
Titan II Propellant Transfer Operations (1980) USAF training film

Relative to their mass, traditional hypergolic propellants possess a lower calorific value than cryogenic propellant combinations like LH_{2}/LO_{2} or LCH_{4}/LO_{2}. A launch vehicle that uses hypergolic propellant must therefore carry a greater mass of fuel than one that uses these cryogenic fuels.

The corrosivity, toxicity, and carcinogenicity of traditional hypergolics necessitate expensive safety precautions. Failure to follow adequate safety procedures with an exceptionally dangerous UDMH-nitric acid propellant mixture nicknamed "devil's venom", for example, resulted in the deadliest rocketry accident in history, the Nedelin catastrophe.

== Hypergolic combinations ==
=== Common ===
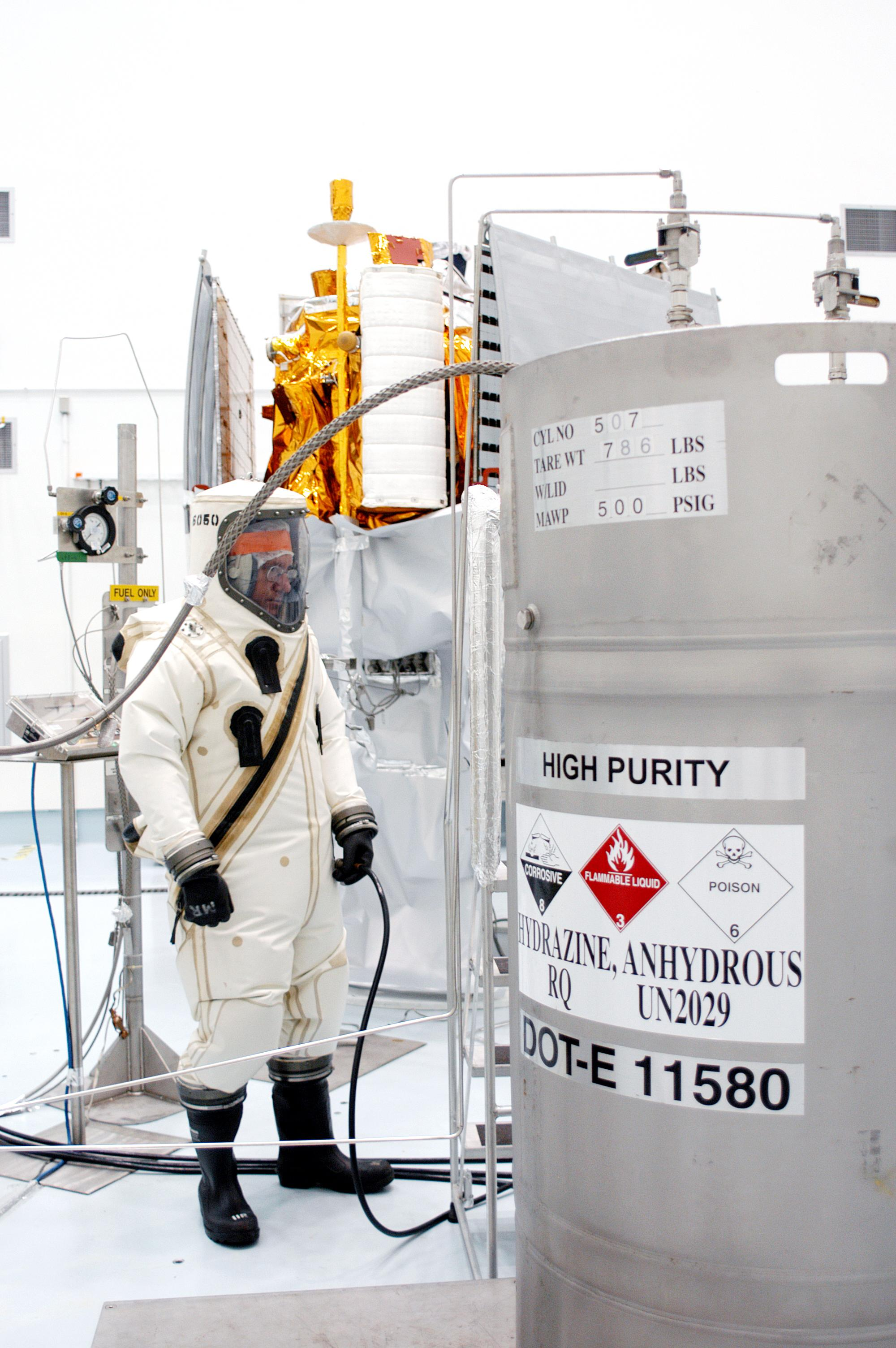
The attendant wears a full hazmat suit while loading hydrazine onto the MESSENGER space probe.

Common hypergolic propellant combinations include:

- Aerozine 50 + nitrogen tetroxide (NTO) is widely used in historical American rockets, including the Titan II and all engines in the Apollo Lunar Module. Aerozine 50 is a mixture of 50% UDMH and 50% straight hydrazine (N_{2}H_{4}).
- Monomethylhydrazine (MMH) + NTO is used in smaller engines and reaction control thrusters: Apollo command and service module RCS, Space Shuttle OMS and RCS; Ariane 5 EPS; Draco thrusters used by the SpaceX Dragon spacecraft.
- Triethylborane/triethylaluminium (TEA-TEB) + liquid oxygen is used during the ignition process of some rocket engines that use liquid oxygen, used by the SpaceX Merlin Engine Family and Rocketdyne F-1.
- UDMH + NTO is frequently used by Roscosmos, such as in the Proton (rocket family), and supplied by them to France for the Ariane 1 first and second stages (replaced with UH 25) and ISRO rockets using Vikas engine.

=== Less common or obsolete ===
Less-common or obsolete hypergolic propellants include:

- Aniline + nitric acid (unstable, explosive) is used in the WAC Corporal.
- Aniline + hydrogen peroxide (dust-sensitive, explosive)
- Furfuryl alcohol + red fuming nitric acid – Copenhagen Suborbitals SPECTRA Engine
- Furfuryl alcohol + white fuming nitric acid
- Hydrazine + nitric acid (toxic but stable) was abandoned due to lack of reliable ignition. No engine with this combination ever went into mass production.
- Kerosene + (high-test peroxide + catalyst) is used in Gamma, with the peroxide first decomposed by a catalyst. Cold hydrogen peroxide and kerosene are not hypergolic, but concentrated hydrogen peroxide (referred to as high-test peroxide or HTP) run over a catalyst produces free oxygen and steam at over 700 °C (1,300 °F), which is hypergolic with kerosene.
- Tonka (TG-02, about 50% triethylamine and 50% xylidine) typically oxidized with nitric acid or its anhydrous nitric oxide derivatives (AK-2x group in the Soviet Union) e.g. AK-20F (80% HNO_{3} and 20% N_{2}O_{4} with inhibitor).
- T-Stoff (stabilized >80% peroxide) + C-Stoff (methanol, hydrazine, water, catalyst) was used in Messerschmitt Me 163 World War II German rocket fighter aircraft, for its Walter 109-509A engine.
- Turpentine + red fuming nitric acid (flown in French Diamant A first-stage)
- UDMH + red fuming nitric acid is used in the MGM-52 Lance missile system, Agena and Able Upper Stages, and Isayev-built maneuvering engines.

=== Proposed, remain unflown ===
- Chlorine trifluoride (ClF_{3}) + all known fuels – Briefly considered as an oxidizer given its high hypergolicity with all standard fuels, it was ultimately abandoned in the 1970s due to the difficulty of handling the substance safely. ClF_{3} is known to burn concrete and gravel. Chlorine pentafluoride (ClF_{5}) presents the same hazards, but offers higher specific impulse than ClF_{3}.
- Pentaborane(9) and diborane + nitrogen tetroxide – Pentaborane(9), a so-called zip fuel, was studied by Soviet rocket scientist V. P. Glushko for use in combination with nitrogen tetroxide in the RD-270M rocket engine. This propellant combination would have yielded a significant increase in performance, but was ultimately given up due to toxicity concerns.
- Tetramethylethylenediamine + red fuming nitric acid is a sightly less-toxic alternative to hydrazine and its derivatives.
- Triethylene glycol dimethyl ether (Triglyme) and Sodium borohydride (8 wt%) + Hydrogen Peroxide has been tested as a green hypergolic propellant combination for rocket engines, however remains unflown.

== Related technology ==
Pyrophoric substances, which ignite spontaneously in the presence of air, are also sometimes used as rocket fuels themselves or to ignite other fuels. For example, a mixture of triethylborane and triethylaluminium (which are both separately and even more so together pyrophoric), was used for engine starts in the SR-71 Blackbird and in the F-1 engines on the NASA Saturn V rocket, and is used in the Merlin engines on the SpaceX Falcon 9 rockets.
