= Mitrofan Nedelin =

Chief Marshal of the Artillery of Soviet Armed Forces

Mitrofan Ivanovich Nedelin
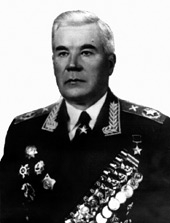
- Born: 9 November [O.S. 27 October] 1902; Borisoglebsk, Voronezh Governorate, Russian Empire
- Died: 24 October 1960 (aged 57); Baikonur Cosmodrome, Kazakh SSR, Soviet Union
- Burial place: Kremlin Wall Necropolis
- Military career
- Allegiance: Soviet Union
- Branch: Artillery; Strategic Rocket Forces
- Service years: 1920–1960
- Rank: Chief marshal of the artillery
- Commands: 13th Artillery Regiment (1939–40); Artillery 160th Rifle Division (1940–41); 4th Anti-Tank Brigade (1941); Artillery 18th Army (1941); Artillery 37th Army (1941–43); Artillery 56th Army (1943); V Artillery Corps (1943); Artillery South-Western Front (1943); Artillery 3rd Ukrainian Front (1943–45); Artillery Southern Soviet Group of Forces (1945–46); Chief Artillery Directorate (1948–50); Artillery (1950–52; 1953–55); Deputy Minister of War (1952–53); Deputy Minister of Defence (1955–60); Strategic Missile Force (1959–60)
- Conflicts: Russian Civil War; Polish Soviet War; Spanish Civil War; Winter War; World War II
- Awards: Hero of the Soviet Union

Mitrofan Ivanovich Nedelin (Russian: Митрофа́н Ива́нович Неде́лин; 9 November [O.S. 27 October] 1902 – 24 October 1960) was a Soviet military officer who held the rank of chief marshal of the artillery. A veteran of the Russian Civil War, he became an artillery officer, commanded the artillery of the 3rd Ukrainian Front in the Second World War and was made a Hero of the Soviet Union in 1945. After the war he commanded the artillery of the Soviet Army, and as a deputy minister of defence he oversaw the development and testing of Soviet ballistic missiles. In December 1959, he became the first commander-in-chief of the Strategic Rocket Forces.

Nedelin was killed on 24 October 1960 at the Tyuratam test range, now the Baikonur Cosmodrome, when an R-16 intercontinental ballistic missile exploded on the launch pad during preparations for its first flight. The Soviet authorities kept the disaster, later known as the Nedelin catastrophe, secret, and announced that he had died in a plane crash.

== Early life ==
Nedelin was born on 9 November [O.S. 27 October] 1902 in Borisoglebsk, then part of Tambov Governorate, into the family of an official of the Ministry of Foreign Affairs of the Russian Empire. He attended primary school in Borisoglebsk from 1909 to 1913, and a real school in Lipetsk from 1913 to 1917. From 1917 to 1920, he worked in railway workshops while studying at an evening school.

== Military career ==
=== Civil War and interwar years ===
In March 1920, Nedelin volunteered for the Red Army. He fought in the Polish–Soviet War, and from May 1921 to April 1922 he took part in suppressing the Antonov uprising in Tambov Governorate. He then fought against the Basmachi in Central Asia. After being discharged on health grounds, he rejoined the Red Army in April 1924, and he joined the Communist Party the same year. Over the following years, he held artillery posts at battery, battalion and regimental level in the Leningrad Military District, and later commanded artillery battalions and training units. He was promoted to major on 13 January 1936, and in 1937 he was chief of staff of a training artillery regiment.

From December 1937 to March 1939, Nedelin served in the Spanish Civil War as a volunteer military adviser to the army of the Republican government. He was promoted to colonel on 5 March 1939. After his return, he commanded an artillery regiment, served as senior artillery inspector of the Moscow Military District, and became chief of artillery of the 160th Rifle Division. In 1940 and 1941, he completed the higher academic courses at the Dzerzhinsky Artillery Academy.

=== World War II ===
After the German invasion of the Soviet Union in 1941, Nedelin commanded the 4th Anti-Tank Artillery Brigade. Between 1941 and 1943, he was successively the artillery commander of the 18th, 37th and 56th Armies and of the North Caucasian Front. He was promoted to major general of artillery on 13 May 1942, and to lieutenant general of artillery on 25 September 1943.

In 1943, Nedelin commanded the 5th Breakthrough Artillery Corps, and then became artillery commander of the Southwestern Front. From 20 October 1943, he was artillery commander of the 3rd Ukrainian Front and a deputy commander of the front. He was promoted to colonel general of artillery on 3 April 1944. The front's artillery under his command took part in the Battle of the Dnieper and in the Iași–Kishinev, Budapest and Vienna offensives. He particularly distinguished himself in the fighting around Lake Balaton in January 1945. On 28 April 1945, he was made a Hero of the Soviet Union for the exemplary performance of his combat tasks and for his courage, and received Gold Star medal No. 5442.

=== Post-war career ===
In July 1945, Nedelin became artillery commander of the Southern Group of Forces. In 1946, he moved to Moscow as chief of staff of the artillery of the armed forces. From November 1948 to March 1950, he headed the Main Artillery Directorate, and he then commanded the artillery of the Soviet Army until January 1952. From January 1952 to April 1953, he was a deputy minister for armaments, after which he again commanded the artillery of the Soviet Army until March 1955. In 1953, he took over command of the artillery from Nikolay Voronov. He was promoted to marshal of artillery on 3 August 1953.

Nedelin was a candidate member of the Central Committee of the Communist Party from 1952 until his death, and a delegate to its 19th and 20th congresses. He was also a deputy of the Supreme Soviet of the Soviet Union in its 4th and 5th convocations.

== Missile programme ==
Nedelin worked on the development of missile and nuclear weapons from 1948 onward. In April 1953, he led a group of senior officers to Kapustin Yar for the first tests of the R-11 missile. On 21 March 1955, he was appointed deputy minister of defence for special armaments and rocket technology. He chaired the State Commission for the launch of an R-5M missile with a live nuclear warhead on 2 February 1956, which Boris Chertok described as the first time in history that a missile had carried a nuclear warhead through space. For the Ministry of Defence, he acted as the customer for the construction of the Tyuratam range, from which the later cosmodrome developed. He was deputy chairman of the State Commission for the tests of the R-7 intercontinental ballistic missile, which was chaired by Vasily Ryabikov. He was also involved in the launch of the first artificial satellite, Sputnik 1. According to the veterans' newspaper Veteran-raketchik, his work covered the R-1, R-2, R-5, R-7, R-12 and R-16 missile systems.

Nedelin was promoted to chief marshal of artillery on 8 May 1959. On 17 December 1959, a decree of the Council of Ministers established the post of commander-in-chief of the Strategic Rocket Forces. Nedelin was appointed to the post, and he remained a deputy minister of defence.

== Death ==
In October 1960, Nedelin chaired the State Commission for the flight tests of the R-16, which had been designed by Mikhail Yangel. According to the space historian Anatoly Zak, Nedelin and Yangel hoped to launch the missile before the anniversary of the October Revolution on 7 November. On 24 October 1960, while the missile was being prepared for launch, Nedelin disregarded safety regulations and remained at the launch pad, sitting about 15 to 20 metres from the fuelled rocket. When the officer Konstantin Gerchik asked him to step aside, Nedelin reportedly replied, "Am I not the officer just like the rest?" At 18:45 local time, about 30 minutes before the planned launch, the second-stage engine ignited unexpectedly and the missile exploded. Nedelin was killed and the explosion reduced his body to ashes: the only identifiable remains found were his partially melted gold star, his watch (stopped at the moment of the explosion), and one of his military shoulder boards. The incident became known as the Nedelin catastrophe, named after Nedelin due to being its most notable victim. Estimates of the death toll vary, with the state commission counting 92 dead and the Russian space agency later putting the figure at 126.

Nikita Khrushchev's government kept the accident completely secret, and Pravda reported that Nedelin had died in a plane crash. The truth first appeared in the Soviet press in 1989, when the magazine Ogonyok published an account of the disaster. Nedelin's funeral was held on Red Square on 27 October 1960, and the urn containing his ashes was placed in the Kremlin Wall. On 20 December 1999, President Boris Yeltsin signed a decree posthumously awarding the Order of Courage to Nedelin and other personnel killed in the disaster.

== Honors and awards ==
Soviet Union and Russia

- Order of Courage (1999, posthumously)
- Hero of the Soviet Union (28 April 1945)
- Five Orders of Lenin (13 September 1944, 28 April 1945, 20 April 1956, 21 December 1957)
- Four Orders of the Red Banner (22 February 1939, 13 December 1942, 3 November 1944, 15 November 1950)
- Order of Suvorov 1st class (19 March 1944)
- Order of Kutuzov 1st class (26 October 1943)
- Order of Bogdan Khmelnitsky 1st class (18 November 1944)
- Order of the Patriotic War 1st class (3 November 1944)
- Order of the Badge of Honour (16 August 1936)
- Medal "For the Defence of the Caucasus" (1944)
- Medal "For the Capture of Budapest" (1945)
- Medal "For the Capture of Vienna" (1945)
- Medal "For the Liberation of Belgrade" (1945)
- Jubilee Medal "XX Years of the Workers' and Peasants' Red Army" (1938)
- Jubilee Medal "30 Years of the Soviet Army and Navy" (1948)
- Jubilee Medal "40 Years of the Armed Forces of the USSR" (1958)

Foreign

- Order of Military Merit (Bulgaria)
- Medal of Sino-Soviet Friendship (China)
- Order of Hungarian Freedom (Hungary)
- Order of the Partisan Star, 1st class (Yugoslavia)

In Russia, 24 October is marked as the day of remembrance of missile troops, and space officials do not schedule launches from Baikonur on that day. A monument to Nedelin was erected in 1964 in Borisoglebsk, on a square named after him, and a bust and memorial plaque stand at Baikonur. Streets in Moscow, Voronezh, Lipetsk, Odesa and Odintsovo are named after him. On 11 November 2002, the Rostov Military Institute of Missile Troops was named after him. In 1998, the Ministry of Defence instituted a badge named "Chief Marshal of Artillery Nedelin".

On 12 June 2020, a three-metre monument to Nedelin by the sculptor Salavat Shcherbakov was unveiled in a square named after him in Serpukhov. In October 2020, a bust of Nedelin, also by Shcherbakov, was unveiled in Balashikha on the day of remembrance of missile troops.

== In other media ==
Nedelin is portrayed by Tim Woodward in the 2005 BBC docudrama series Space Race.
