= Alexander Golovanov =

Soviet air marshal (1904–1975)

Alexander Yevgeniyevich Golovanov
- Александр Евгеньевич Голованов
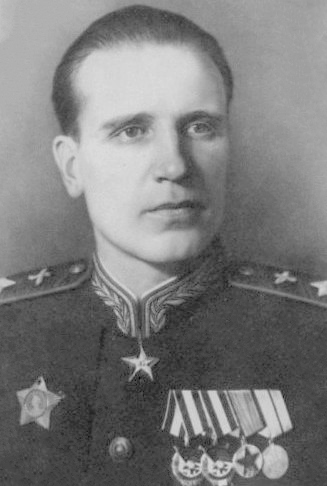
- Born: 7 August 1904; Nizhny Novgorod, Russian Empire
- Died: 22 September 1975 (aged 71); Moscow, Soviet Union
- Military career
- Allegiance: Soviet Union
- Branch: Soviet Air Force
- Service years: 1924–1953
- Rank: Chief marshal of Aviation
- Commands: 18th Air Army Long Range Aviation 15th Airborne Corps
- Conflicts: Russian Civil War; Battles of Khalkhin Gol; World War II; Winter War; Eastern Front
- Awards: Order of Lenin (2x)

Alexander Yevgeniyevich Golovanov (Russian: Алекса́ндр Евге́ньевич Голова́нов; 7 August 1904 – 22 September 1975) was a Soviet pilot. On 3 August 1943, he became a Marshal of Aviation (the youngest person in the history of the USSR to hold that rank) and on 19 August 1944 he was promoted to the rank of Chief marshal of the aviation (the second after Alexander Novikov).

== World War II ==
At the start of the German-Soviet War (June 1941), Golovanov commanded the 212th Heavy Bomber Regiment; then he became commander (in office: August to December 1941) of the 81st Long Range Bomber Division, subordinated to the Supreme Command Headquarters. The division led by him bombed, with his personal participation, enemy military facilities in Berlin (August to September 1941), Königsberg (1 September 1941), Gdańsk (Danzig), Ploieşti and other cities.

During the Battle of Moscow (October 1941 to January 1942) his "long-range aviation hit powerful blows on artillery positions, tank formations and command posts."

From February 1942 he commanded the Red Army Air Force's long-range bomber force (ADD; Russian: Авиация дальнего действия (АДД)), which transformed into the 18th Air Army on 6 December 1944. The 18th Air Army's units delivered air strikes against the Axis' deep rear, supported ground forces during the East Prussian, Vienna and Berlin operations and fulfilled tasks to help the Partisans of Yugoslavia.

As commander of the Soviet Long Range Aviation (ADD), Golovanov received orders to destroy Helsinki in early 1944, in order to force Finland to accept Soviet-dictated terms of peace. Due to deception and skilled use of radar, Finnish anti-aircraft artillery succeeded in saving the city (February 1944). When Stalin later in 1944 found out that he had been mis-informed of the bombing results, ADD was dissolved (6 December 1944) as a punishment. This failure hampered Golovanov's career.

== Honours and awards ==
- Two Orders of Lenin
- Three Orders of the Red Banner
- Three Orders of Suvorov 1st class
- Order of the Red Star
- Medal "Partisan of the Patriotic War" 1st class
- Medal "For the Defence of Stalingrad"
- Medal "For the Defence of Moscow"
- Medal "For Courage"
- Medal "For the Capture of Königsberg"
- Medal "For the Capture of Berlin"
- Medal "For the Victory over Germany in the Great Patriotic War 1941–1945"
