= Valentin Glushko =

Soviet rocket engineer (1908–1989)

- Валентин Глушко
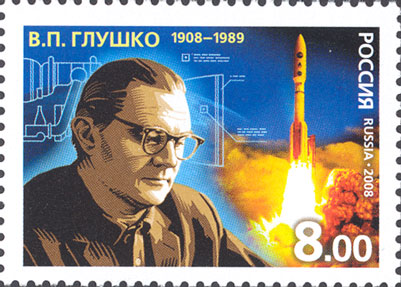
- Born: 2 September 1908; Odessa, Russian Empire (now Ukraine)
- Died: 10 January 1989 (aged 80); Moscow, Russian SFSR, Soviet Union
- Resting place: Novodevichy Cemetery, Moscow
- Education: Leningrad State University
- Engineering career
- Discipline: Engineering (Computer)
- Institutions: Soviet space program
- Significant design: Almaz

Signature
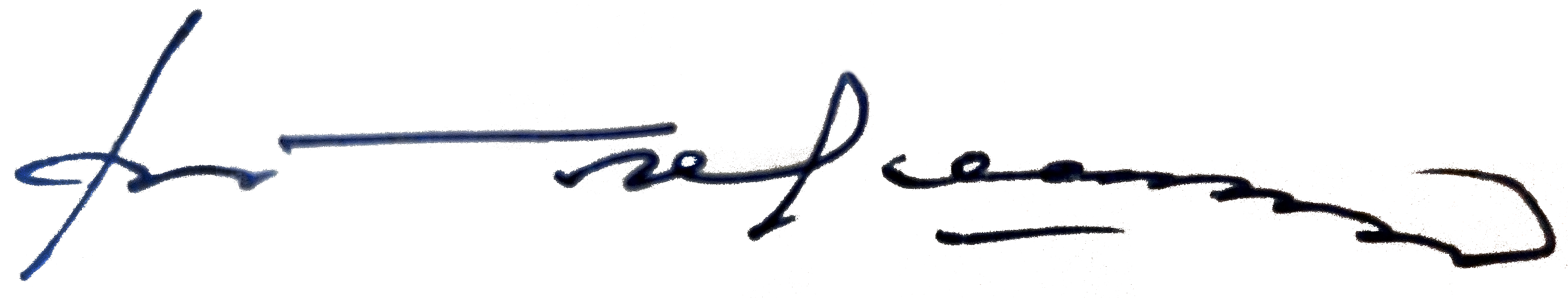

Valentin Petrovich Glushko (Russian: Валентин Петрович Глушко; Ukrainian: Валентин Петрович Глушко, romanized: Valentyn Petrovych Hlushko; 2 September 1908 – 10 January 1989) was a Soviet engineer who was program manager of the Soviet space program from 1974 until 1989.

Glushko served as a main designer of rocket engines in the Soviet program during the heights of the Space Race between United States and the Soviet Union, and was the proponent of cybernetics within the space program.

== Biography ==
Valentin Glushko was born on 2 September 1908 (21 August according to the old calendar) in Odesa to a Ukrainian cossack father and a Russian peasant mother.

At the age of fourteen he became interested in aeronautics after reading novels by Jules Verne. He is known to have written a letter to Konstantin Tsiolkovsky in 1923. He studied at an Odessa trade school, where he learned to be a sheet metal worker. After graduation he apprenticed at a hydraulics fitting plant. He was first trained as a fitter, then moved to lathe operator.

During his time in Odessa, Glushko performed experiments with explosives. These were recovered from unexploded artillery shells that had been left behind by the White Guards during their retreat. From 1924 to 1925 he wrote articles concerning the exploration of the Moon, as well as the use of Tsiolkovsky's proposed engines for space flight.

He attended Leningrad State University where he studied physics and mathematics, but found the specialty programs were not to his interest. He reportedly left without graduating in April, 1929. From 1929 to 1930 he pursued rocket research at the Gas Dynamics Laboratory (GDL), where a new research section was set up for the study of liquid-propellant and electric engines. He became a member of the Reactive Scientific Research Institute, founded in Moscow in 1931 when GDL merged with the Group for the Study of Reactive Motion (GIRD)

On 23 March 1938 he became caught up in Joseph Stalin's Great Purge and was rounded up by the NKVD, to be placed in the Butyrka prison. By 15 August 1939 he was sentenced to eight years imprisonment; however, Glushko was put to work on various aircraft projects with other arrested scientists. In 1941 he was placed in charge of a design bureau for liquid-fueled rocket engines. He was finally released in 1944. In 1944, Sergei Korolev and Glushko designed the RD-1 kHz auxiliary rocket motor tested in a fast-climb La-7R for protection of the capital from high-altitude Luftwaffe attacks.

At the end of World War II, Glushko was sent to Germany and Eastern Europe to study the German rocket program. As part of this he attended an Operation Backfire launch as Colonel Glushko. In 1946, he became the chief designer of his own bureau, the OKB 456, and remained at this position until 1974. This bureau would play a prominent role in the development of rocket engines within the Soviet Union.

His OKB 456 (later NPO Energomash) would design the 35-metric ton (340 kN) thrust RD-101 engine used in the R-2, the 120-ton (1,180 kN) thrust RD-110 employed in the R-3, and the 44-ton (430 kN) thrust RD-103 used in the R-5 Pobeda (SS-3 Shyster). The R-7 ("Semyorka") would include four of Glushko's RD-107 engines and one RD-108. In 1954, he began to design engines for the R-12 Dvina (SS-4 Sandal), which had been designed by Mikhail Yangel. He also became responsible for supplying rocket engines for Sergei Korolev, the designer of the R-9 Desna (SS-8 Sasin). Among his designs was the powerful RD-170 liquid propellant engine.

In 1974, following the six successful American Moon landings, premier Leonid Brezhnev decided to cancel the troubled Soviet program to send a man to the Moon. He consolidated the Soviet space program, moving Vasily Mishin's OKB-1 (Korolev's former design bureau), as well as other bureaus, into a single bureau headed by Glushko, later named NPO Energia. Glushko's first act, after firing Mishin altogether, was to cancel the N-1 rocket, a program he had long criticized, despite the fact that one of the reasons for its difficulties was his own refusal to design the high-power engines Korolev needed because of friction between the two men and ostensibly a disagreement over the use of cryogenic or hypergolic fuel.

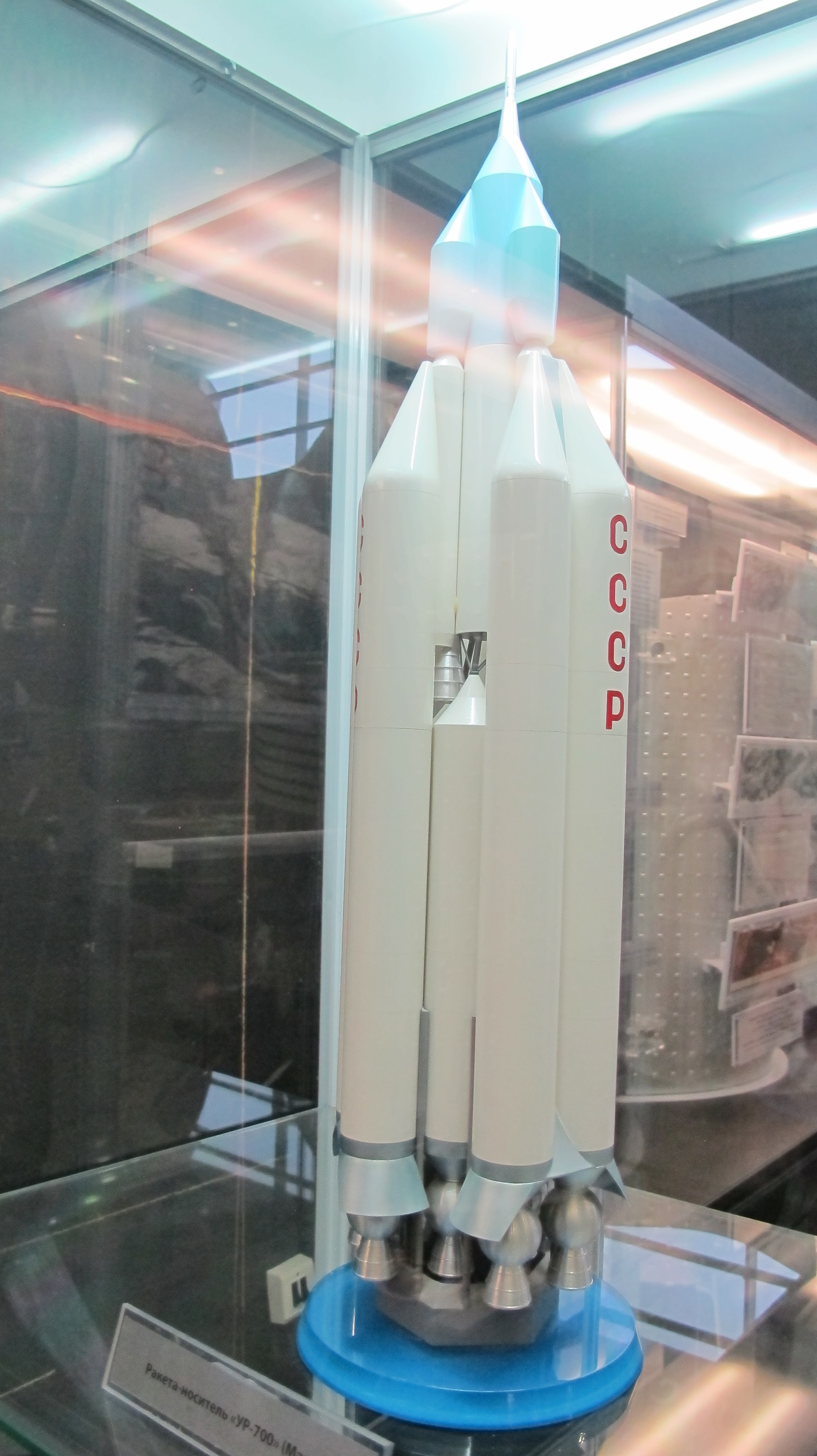
UR-700

In 1965, after the UR-500 booster began flying, the Chelomei Bureau offered a counterproposal to Korolev's N-1 in the UR-700, a Saturn V-class booster with nine F-1 sized engines powered by dinitrogen tetroxide and UDMH. Korolev was an outspoken opponent of hypergolic propellants due to their toxicity, often citing the 1960 Nedelin catastrophe as evidence of the danger posed by them, and had also objected to the UR-500 for the same reason.

Glushko meanwhile was an advocate of Vladimir Chelomei's UR-700 as well as an even more powerful UR-900 with a nuclear-powered upper stage. When Korolev continued protesting about the safety risk posed by hypergolic propellants, Glushko responded with the counterargument that the US was launching the crewed Gemini spacecraft atop a Titan II rocket with very similar propellants and it was not a safety issue for them. He also argued that the N-1 was not a workable solution because they could not develop RP-1/LOX engines on the scale of the Saturn F-1. When Korolev suggested developing a liquid hydrogen engine for the N-1, Glushko said that LH2 was completely impractical as a rocket fuel.

The UR-700, Glushko said, could enable a direct-ascent trajectory to the Moon, which he considered safer and more reliable than the rendezvous-and-dock approach used by the Apollo program and Korolev's N-1 proposals. He also imagined the UR-700 and 900 in all sorts of applications, from lunar bases to crewed Mars missions to outer planet probes to orbiting battle stations.

When Korolev died in January 1966, his deputy Vasily Mishin took over the OKB-1 design bureau. Mishin succeeded in getting the Kremlin to terminate the UR-700/900 project and the RD-270 engine Glushko planned for the launch vehicle family. His main arguments were the tremendous safety risk posed by a low-altitude launch failure of the UR-700 and the waste of money by developing two heavy-lift launch vehicle (HLV) families at once.

After the complete failure of the Soviet crewed lunar effort, uncrewed Mars missions, and the deaths of four cosmonauts, Mishin was fired in 1973 and the Kremlin decided to consolidate the entire Soviet space program into one organization headed by Glushko.

One of Glushko's first acts was to suspend the N-1 program, which, however, was not formally terminated until 1976. He then began work on a completely new HLV. During this time, the US was developing the Space Shuttle.

Glushko decided that the new HLV, Energia, would use entirely liquid-fueled engines, with an LH2 core stage taking the place of the Shuttle main engines, and the Shuttle's solid-propellant strap-on boosters with liquid boosters using LOX/RP-1 RD-170 engines.

While the RD-120 engine used for the Energia core stage was developed quickly and with little difficulty, the RD-170 proved harder to work out. Glushko instead decided to use an engine with four combustion chambers fed from a single propellant feed line. The RD-170 powered strap-on boosters designed for Energia became the basis for the Zenit booster family which began flying in 1985. Since the Buran space shuttle was not ready for operations, Energia's maiden flight in May 1987 carried aloft a prototype space station module called Polyus. Ultimately, Buran did fly the following summer, a few months before Glushko's death.

While Energia and Buran fell victim to loss of funding after the collapse of the USSR, the RD-170 engines and its derivatives are still flying today and the experience in LH2 engines made during the Energia project would be used in later upper stages such as Briz.

Glushko's team was part of the Soviet Ministry of General Machine Building headed by Minister Sergey Afanasyev. Before his death, he appointed Boris Gubanov to become his successor.

Glushko died on January 10, 1989. His obituary was signed by multiple Communist Party of the Soviet Union leaders, including Mikhail Gorbachev. He was buried at Novodevichy Cemetery in Moscow.

His most significant engineering failure, as noted by division chief Yuri Demyanko, was his insistence that hydrogen fuel was unsuitable for use as a rocket fuel. As a result, the Soviet space program was still discussing using hydrogen-fueled engines while the Americans were assembling the Saturn V launcher. Also, Glushko's design bureau consistently failed at building a rocket engine powered by LOX/Kerosene with a large combustion chamber to rival the American F-1 used on the Saturn V; instead, his solution was the RD-270, a single large combustion-chamber engine powered by hypergolic propellants which had almost the same thrust and better specific impulse when compared to the F-1 engine. In addition, the RD-270 used the very advanced full-flow, staged, closed-cycle combustion concept instead of the simple open-cycle gas generator design used by the F-1 rocket engine. This was a primary reason for the failure of the N-1, which was forced to rely on a multitude of smaller engines for propulsion since Sergei Korolev, its chief designer, insisted on using the LOX/Kerosene combination, which Glushko felt would take much more time and money to design. Glushko never did overcome the combustion instability problems of large rocket engines using kerosene propellants; his eventual solution for this is seen on the RD-170 which is basically four smaller combustion chamber/nozzle assemblies sharing common fuel delivery systems. This solution and engine gave the Soviets the large thrust propulsion needed to build the Energia super heavy-lift launch vehicle, and is probably the finest example of Glushko's technical abilities when he was at his best.

== Honours and awards ==
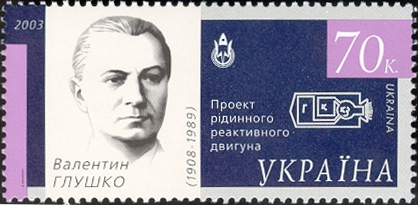
Stamp of Ukraine, 2003

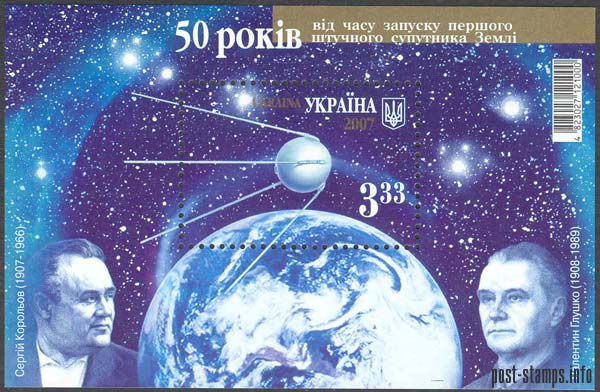
Valentin Glushko and Sergei Korolev on a 2007 Ukrainian stamp

- Hero of Socialist Labour, twice (1956, 1961)
- Order of Lenin, five times (1956, 1958, 1961, 1968, 1978)
- Order of the October Revolution (1971)
- Order of the Red Banner of Labour (1945)
- Jubilee Medal "For Valiant Labour. To commemorate the 100th anniversary of the birth of Vladimir Ilyich Lenin" (1970)
- Jubilee Medal "Thirty Years of Victory in the Great Patriotic War 1941-1945" (1975)
- Jubilee Medal "Forty Years of Victory in the Great Patriotic War 1941-1945" (1985)
- Medal "For Valiant Labour in the Great Patriotic War 1941-1945" (1945)
- Medal "Veteran of Labour" (1984)
- Medal "In Commemoration of the 800th Anniversary of Moscow" (1948)
- Lenin Prize (1957)
- USSR State Prize (1967, 1984)
- Gold Medal. Tsiolkovsky Academy of Sciences of the USSR (1958)
- Diploma of them. Paul Tissandier (FAI) (1967)
- Honorary Citizen of Korolyov
- Asteroid number 6357, discovered in 1976, was named in Glushko's honour by Nikolai Stepanovich Chernykh
- Crater Glushko on the Moon is named after him
- An avenue in the Ukrainian capital Kyiv is named after Glushko

== Bibliography ==
- V. P. Glushko and G. Langemak, Rockets, Their Construction and Application, 1935.
- Glushko, V. P., Rocket Engines GDL-OKB, Novosti Publishing House, Moscow, 1975.
- V. P. Glushko, Development of Rocketry Space Technology in the USSR, Novosti Press Publishing House, Moscow (1973)

== Sources ==
- Harford, James J. (1997). Korolev: how one man masterminded the Soviet drive to beat America to the moon. New York: Wiley. ISBN 0-471-14853-9.
- "Rockets and people" – B. E. Chertok, M: "mechanical engineering", 1999. ISBN 5-217-02942-0 (in Russian); English translation at the NASA website.
- "Testing of rocket and space technology - the business of my life" Events and facts - A.I. Ostashev, Korolyov, 2001.;
- "Bank of the Universe" - edited by Boltenko A. C., Kyiv, 2014., publishing house "Phoenix", ISBN 978-966-136-169-9
- A.I. Ostashev, Sergey Pavlovich Korolyov - The Genius of the 20th Century — 2010 M. of Public Educational Institution of Higher Professional Training MGUL ISBN 978-5-8135-0510-2.
- Valentin Glushko //Family history
- "S. P. Korolev. Encyclopedia of life and creativity" - edited by C. A. Lopota, RSC Energia. S. P. Korolev, 2014 ISBN 978-5-906674-04-3
- The official website of the city administration Baikonur - Honorary citizens of Baikonur
- "Space science city Korolev" - Author: Posamentir R. D. M: publisher SP Struchenevsky O. V., ISBN 978-5-905234-12-5
- "I look back and have no regrets. " - Author: Abramov, Anatoly Petrovich: publisher "New format" Barnaul, 2022. ISBN 978-5-00202-034-8
