= Devil's venom =

Rocket fuel combination

Devil's venom was a nickname coined by Soviet rocket scientists for a hypergolic liquid rocket fuel composed of a dangerous combination of red fuming nitric acid (RFNA) and unsymmetrical dimethylhydrazine (UDMH). Both propellants are extremely dangerous individually: nitric acid is highly corrosive and releases toxic nitrogen dioxide during reactions, or even simply while exposed to air in its highly concentrated "red fuming" form, typically used as rocket propellant. UDMH is both toxic and corrosive.

Despite these dangers, the pairing has been useful in rocketry because, as a combination of fuel and oxidizer, it is hypergolic (i.e. it does not require an external ignition source), which allows rockets using this type of fuel to be simpler. Further, both components have high boiling points compared to other rocket fuels (such as liquid hydrogen) and oxidizers (such as liquid oxygen), allowing rockets to be stored ready for launch for long periods without the fuel or oxidizer boiling off and needing to be replenished.

== See also ==
- C-Stoff
- UDMH
- Nedelin catastrophe
