= R-9 Desna =

Soviet intermediate-range ballistic missile

R-9
- Type: ICBM

Service history
- In service: 1964–1976
- Used by: Soviet Union

Production history
- Designed: From 1959
- Manufacturer: OKB-1

Specifications
- Mass: 80.4 tonnes
- Length: 24,190 mm
- Diameter: 2,680 mm
- Warhead: 1
- Blast yield: 1.65 Mt ("light") or 2.3 Mt ("heavy") warheads
- Engine: Two-stage liquid fuel (kerosene + LOX): 1. first stage engine RD-111 (8D716) by OKB-456 of Valentin Glushko.; 2. second stage engine RD-0106 RO-9 (8D715) by OKB-154 of S.A.Kosberg
- Payload capacity: 1,700 - 2,200 kg
- Operational range: 2,000–6,000 km
- Guidance system: inertial, Control system by NII-885 of N.A.Pilyugin and M.S.Ryazanski. Gyroscopes by NII-944 of V.I.Kuznetsov.
- Accuracy: 2 km CEP

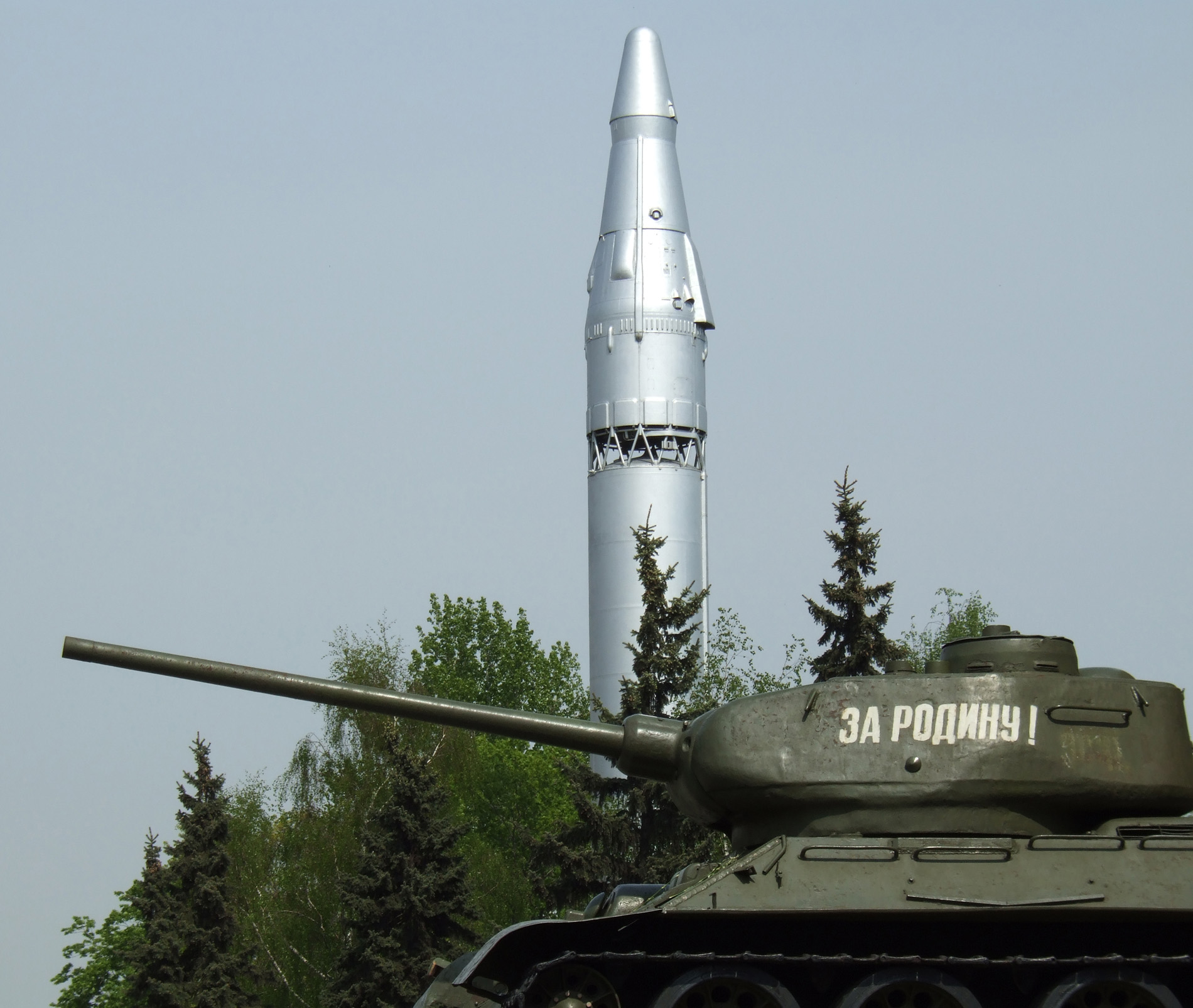
R-9 ICBM and T-34 tank, on display at the Central Armed Forces Museum (Russia)

The R-9 (Russian: Р-9; NATO reporting name: SS-8 Sasin) was a two-stage ICBM of the Soviet Union, in service from 1964 to 1976.

== History ==
Designed in 1959 and first tested in 1961, the R-9 was a great improvement over previous Soviet missile designs. The missile, capable of delivering a 1,600 kg (3,500 lb) payload about up to 6,071 kilometres (3,278 nmi) to an accuracy of 2 kilometres (1.1 nmi), was not only very accurate, but was also far more tactically useful to the Soviet Union. Previous Soviet designs, fuelled with cryogenic LOX and kerosene, commonly took hours to fuel and launch. The R-9, on the other hand, could be launched 20 minutes from the time a launch order was given. NPO "Electropribor" (Kharkiv, Ukraine) designed the missile's control system.

First put into active service in 1964, the R-9 carried a 1.65 to 5 Mt warhead. Though the last Soviet missile to use cryogenic propellant, this design is one of the most widely deployed ICBMs to use cryogenic fuel. OKB-456 (later renamed to NPO Energomash) developed the first stage engine RD-111 with a thrust of 1,385 kN, a four-chambered closed cycle design with flexible pipelines and gimbals for thrust vectoring together with Vernier thrusters. The second stage, connected by trusses to the first stage (much like the modern Soyuz rocket) was the four-chambered RD-0106 engine, but utilized an open cycle design with vacuum optimized combustion chambers more suited to very high altitudes. This rocket engine was a product of the OKB-154 design team. Guidance of the warhead, like most ICBMs before and after it, was totally inertial save the final ten seconds before detonation of the warhead, which was controlled by a radio-altimeter correction system.

=== Deployment ===
The initial design called for a mobile surface-launched system, but more accurate ground-attack systems capable of defeating mobile launchers saw a silo-based R-9 developed in tandem with the ground-based system. The ground-based system, however, never achieved the hoped-for mobility of the initial design parameters. In total, three launch sites were constructed, but only two were used. "Desna-V" (Десна-В, named for a river in Russia/Ukraine), the silo launch area, consisted of three underground silos with the ability to launch the R-9 within 20 minutes, and the ability to store the missile in an unfueled ready condition for one year. "Valley", the first of two above-ground launch sites, was mostly automated and could fire the R-9 within 20 minutes as well, and repeat the process within two and a half hours. The final launch site, "Desna-N" (Десна-Н), was also an above-ground site, but was never stocked with R-9s as the site was not automated and needed at least two hours to launch a single missile.

In 1971 the above-ground R-9 launch sites were decommissioned, and by 1976 all R-9 missiles had been decommissioned.

=== NATO reporting name ===
SS-8 Sasin is a NATO reporting name that was mistakenly applied to two different Soviet missile systems. The designation was accidentally applied to the R-26 when an example of that missile was revealed in a parade. However, the R-26 program had already been cancelled and no new designation was given by NATO for the R-26 once the error was discovered.

=== 1963 fire ===
On October 24, 1963, an R-9 missile was being prepared for launch in a silo from Site 70 at Baikonur Cosmodrome. The 11-man launch crew did not realize that an oxygen leak from the missile's fuel system had raised the partial oxygen pressure to 32% (the maximum allowed was 21%). The crew was descending to the eighth level in a lift when a spark from an electrical panel started a fire in the oxygen-enriched atmosphere, killing seven and destroying the silo. The disaster occurred exactly three years after the Nedelin disaster. October 24 became known as Baikonur's "Black Day", and to this day no launches are attempted on that date.

== Data ==
- Fuel: kerosene + oxygen.
- Control system by NII-885 of N.A.Pilyugin and M.S.Ryazanski.
- Gyroscopes by NII-944 of V.I.Kuznetsov.
- Launcher by GSKB "Spetsmash" of V.P.Barmin.
- First stage engine RD-111 (8D716) by OKB-456 of V.P.Glushko.
- Second stage engine RO-9 (8D715) by OKB-154 of S.A.Kosberg.
- 1.65 Mt ("light") and 2.3 Mt ("heavy") warheads.
- Tested at "ground No 51" at NIIP-5 (Baikonur/Tura-Tam) until crash in October 1962.
- Serial production at facility No. 1 in Kuibyshev.
- Deployed 2 regiments of ground based missiles at Kozelsk, 1 regiment of ground based missiles at Plesetsk, 1 regiment of underground silo missiles at Kozelsk.

== Operators ==
Soviet Union
The Strategic Rocket Forces were the only operator of the R-9.

== See also ==
- List of missiles
