= Chief marshal of the branch =

Soviet military rank

Chief marshal of a branch главный маршал рода войск
- Small Marshal's Star

- Branch specific shoulder boards
- Country: Soviet Union
- Service branch: Soviet Army; Soviet Air Forces
- Rank group: General officer
- Rank: Marshal
- Formation: 1943
- Abolished: 1991
- Next higher rank: Generalissimo of the Soviet Union
- Next lower rank: Marshal of the branch
- Equivalent ranks: Marshal of the Soviet Union

Chief marshal of the branch (Russian: главный маршал рода войск, romanized: glavny marshal roda voysk) was a senior military rank of the Soviet Armed Forces. It was immediately above the rank of Marshal of the branch and was considered equivalent to the rank of Marshal of the Soviet Union.

== History ==
The ranks of chief marshal of aviation, artillery, armoured troops, engineer troops, and signals were established on 9 October 1943. The three former branches had already had (since 4 February 1943) the corresponding ranks of marshal; in the two latter branches the ranks of marshal and of chief marshal were established simultaneously. When the rank of chief marshal was established, the size of the shoulder board's stars for all marshals except the rank of Marshal of the Soviet Union were made about 10mm smaller, and for chief marshals, the star was surrounded by a laurel wreath. On the uniform tie, chief marshals wore the marshal's star of the 2nd level. During the next forty years, the ranks of chief marshal were conferred mainly on deputy defense ministers – commanders of the corresponding branch. The ranks of chief marshal of engineer troops and chief marshal of signals, abolished in 1984, were never conferred on anybody. No chief marshal promotions were conferred after 1984. The youngest chief marshal was aviator Golovanov, 40 when promoted in 1944. Three of thirteen people who held the chief marshal rank did not retire normally: Novikov was imprisoned for seven years; Nedelin perished in the flame of an exploded rocket; Varentsov was accused of heedlessness, dismissed and degraded (his subordinate, Oleg Penkovsky, had been found to be a spy).

=== Shoulder boards & epaulettes ===
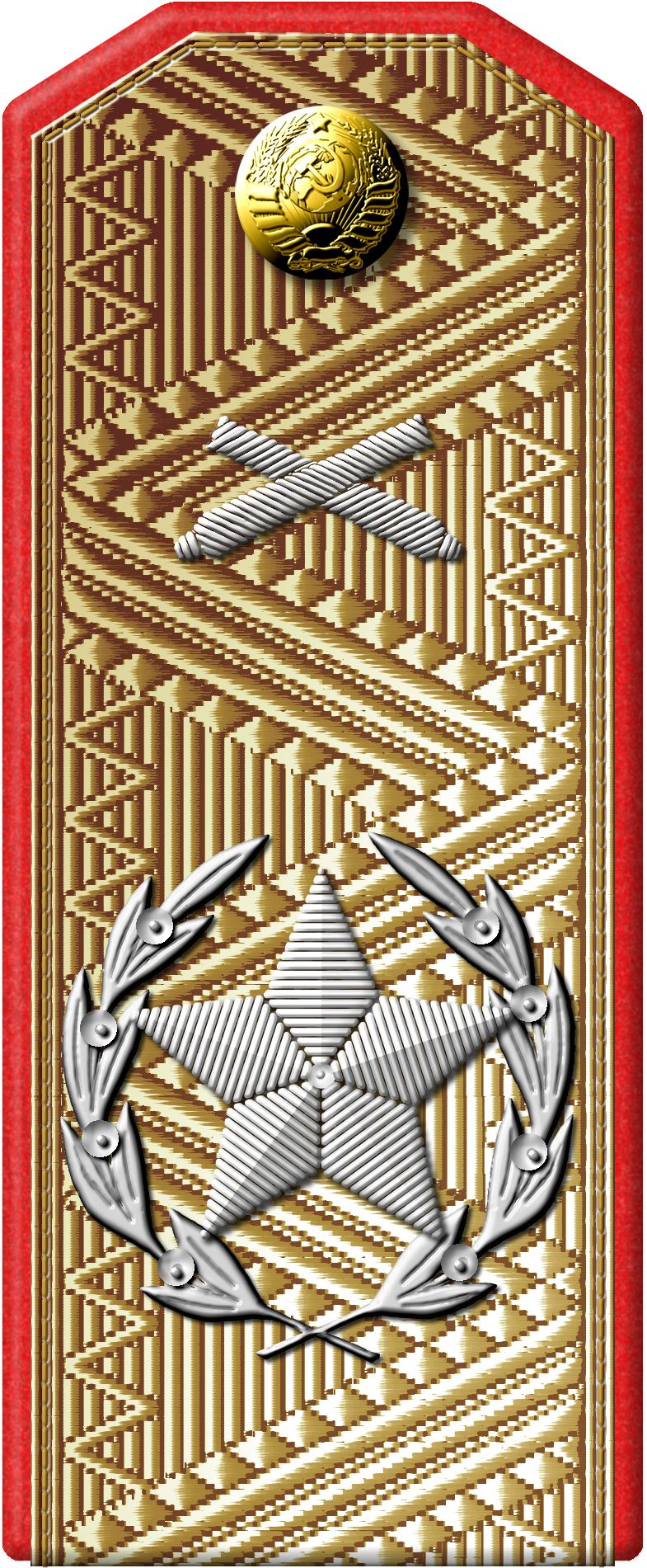
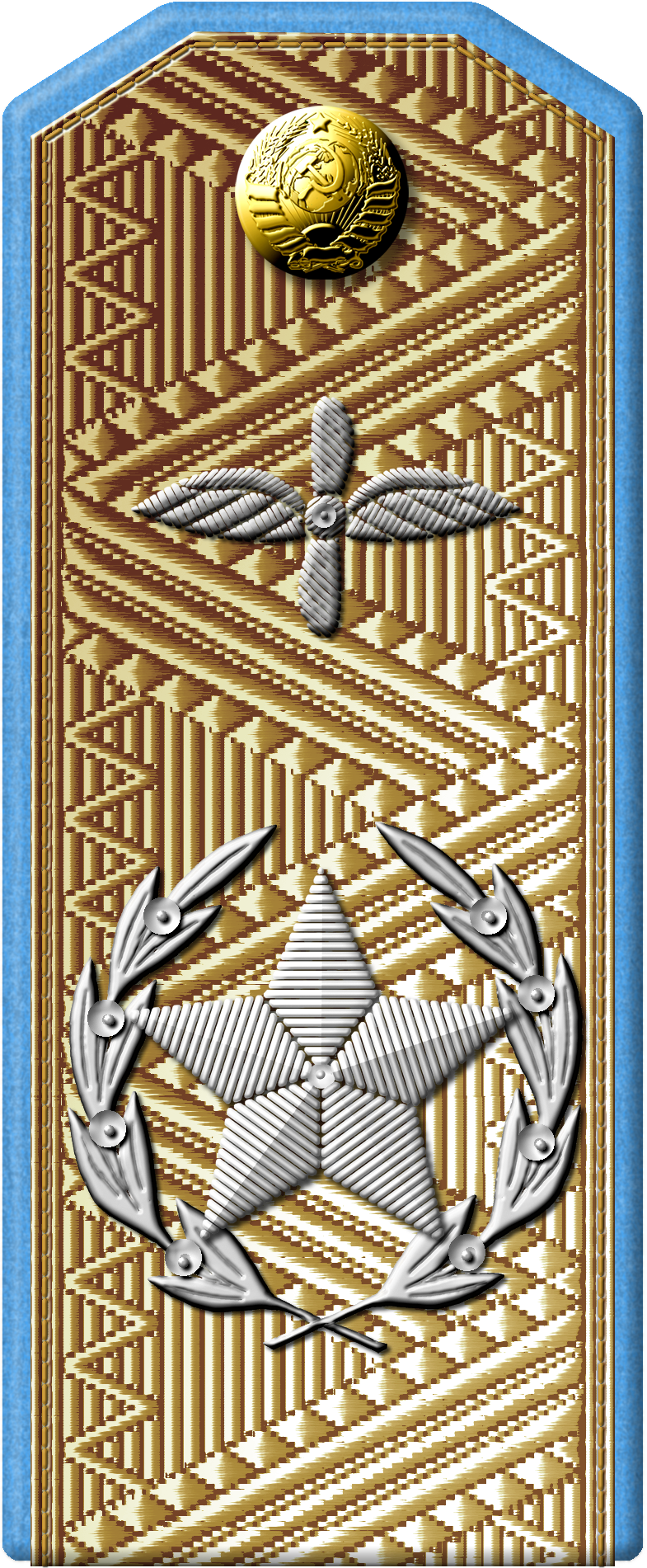
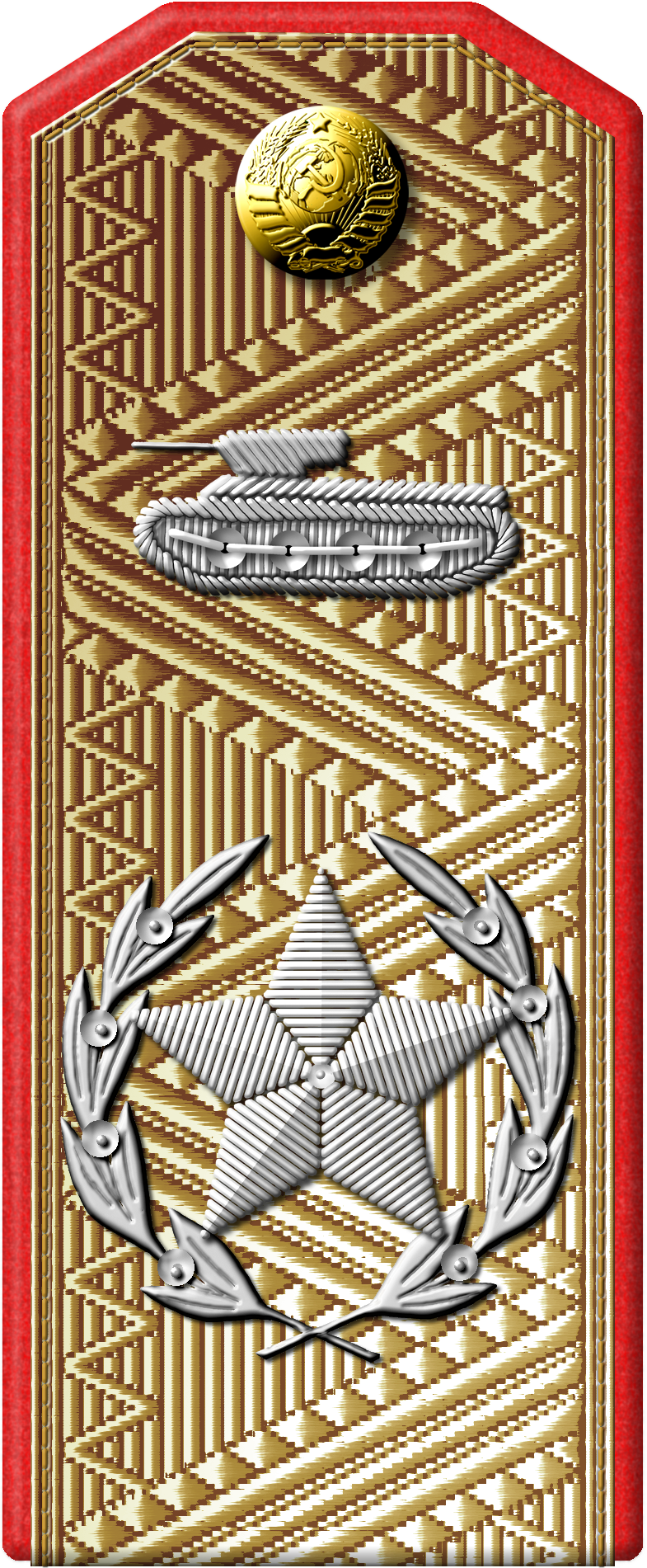
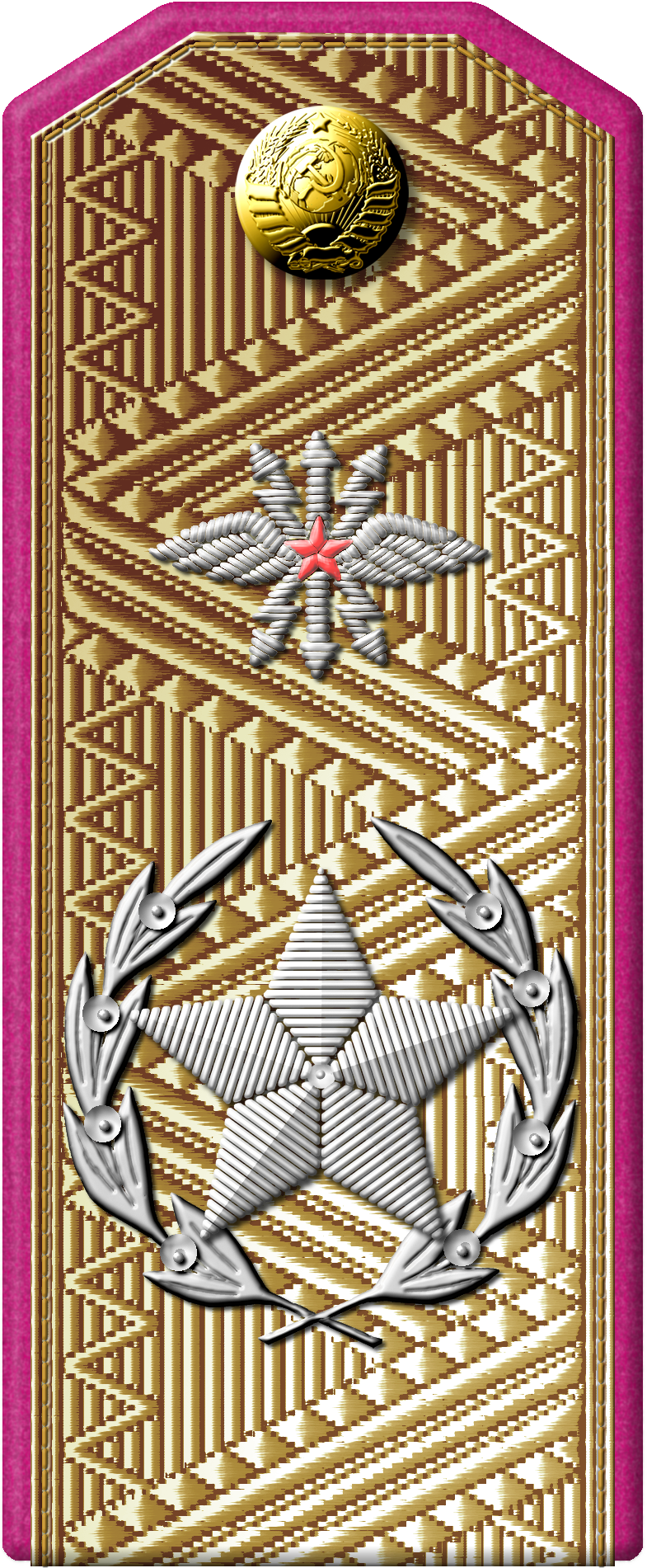
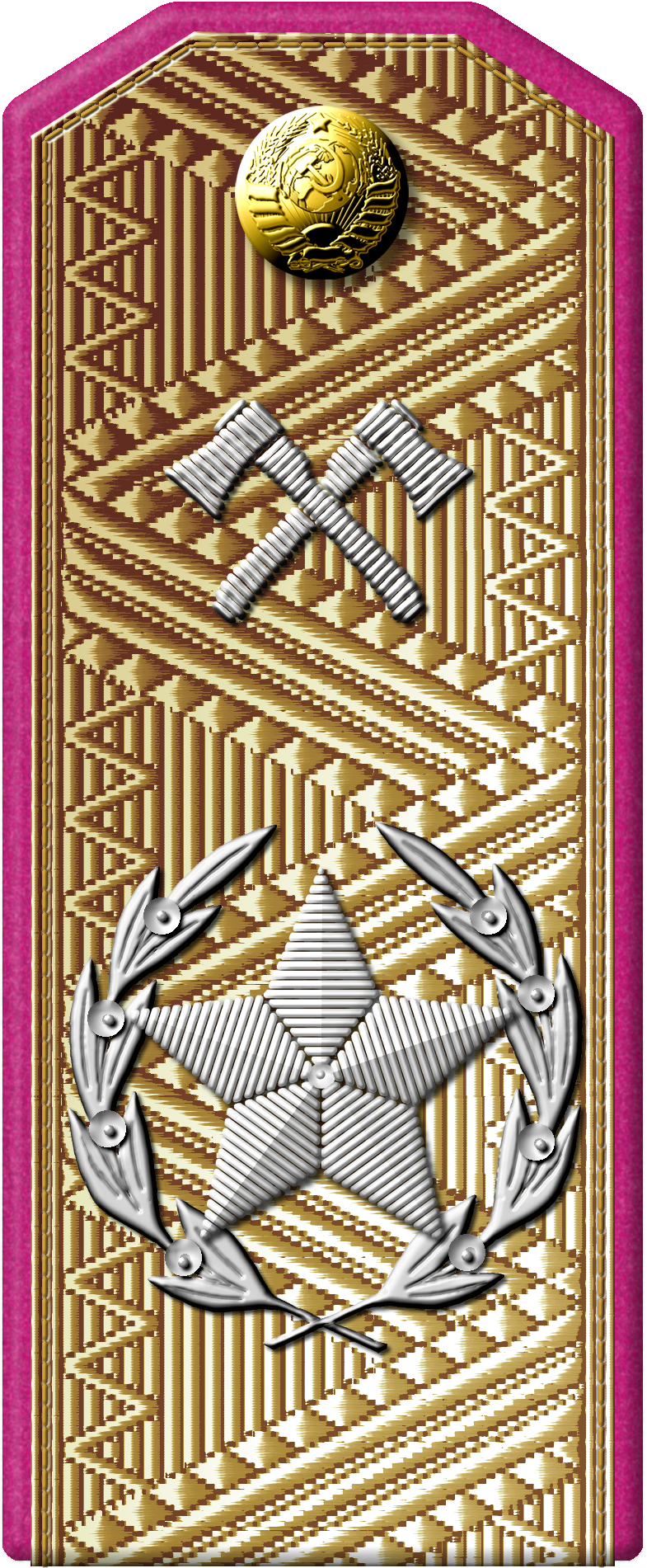
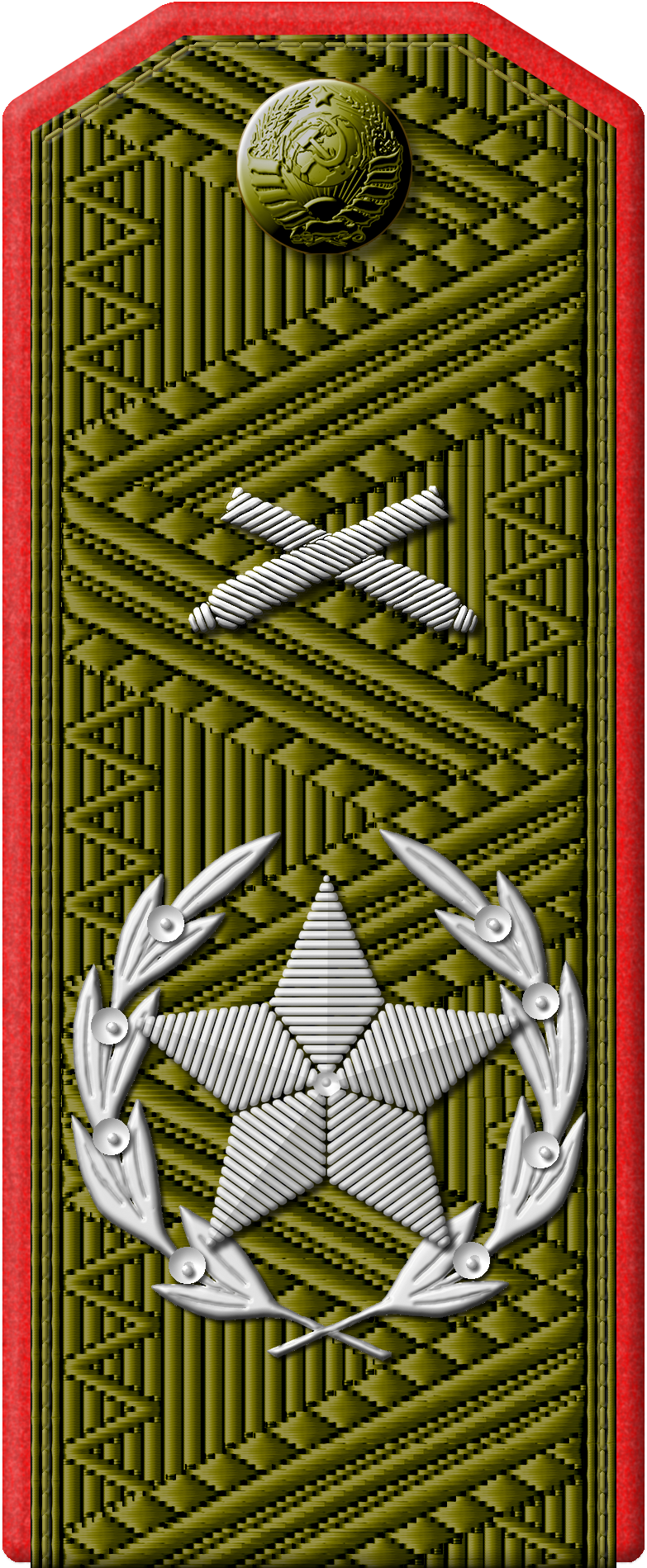
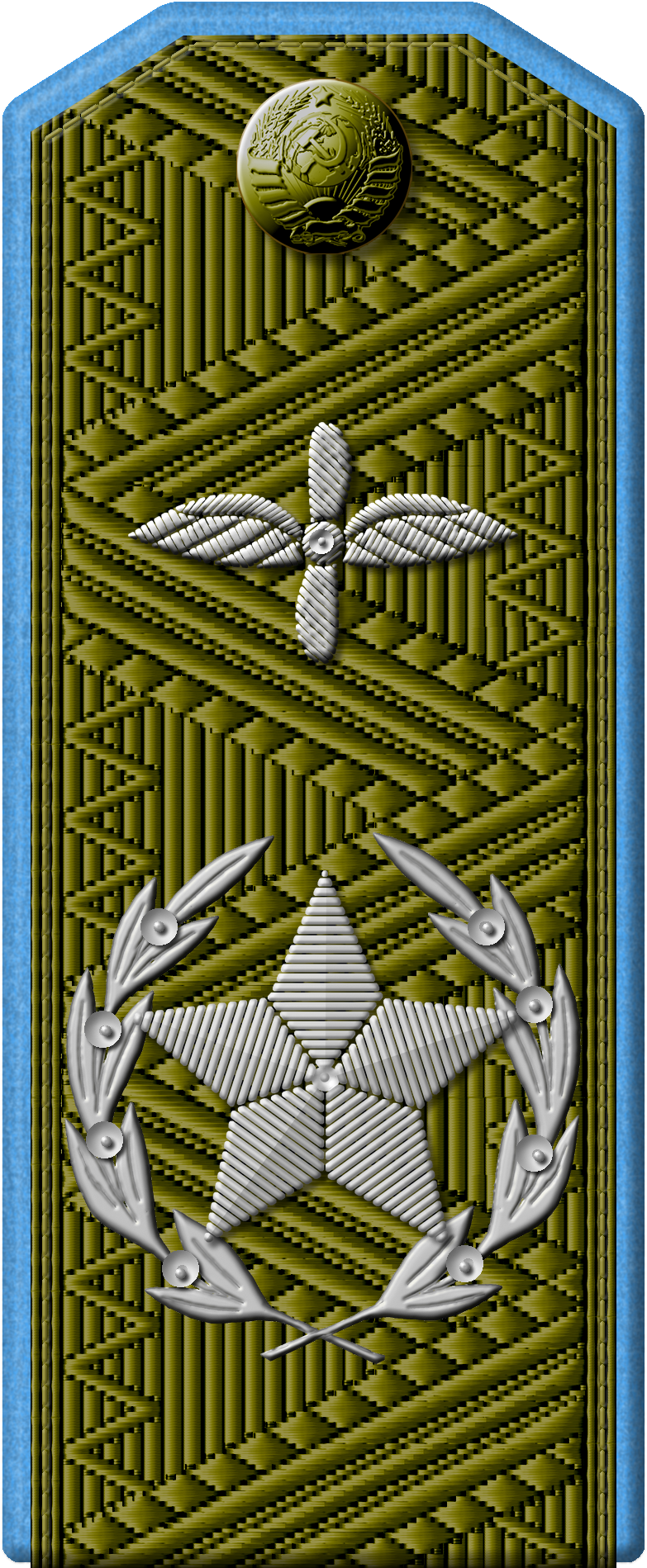
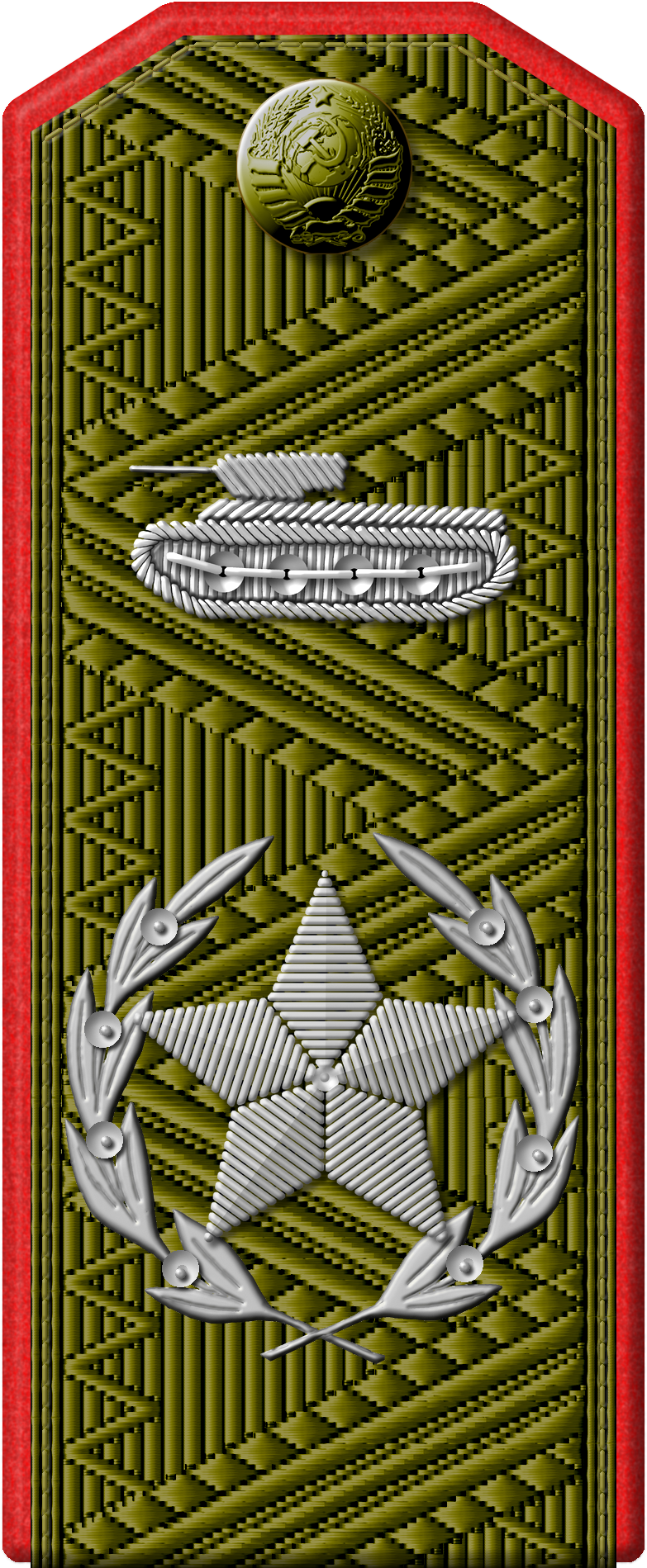
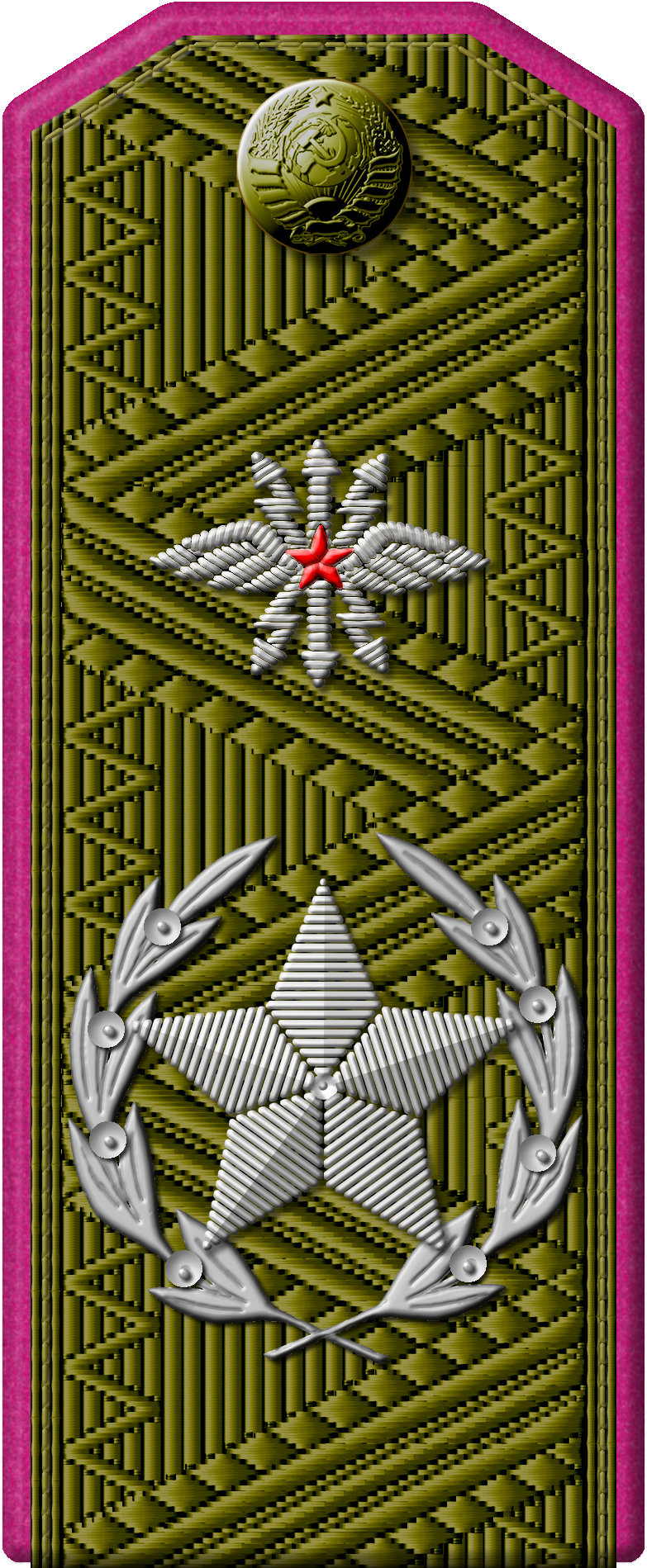
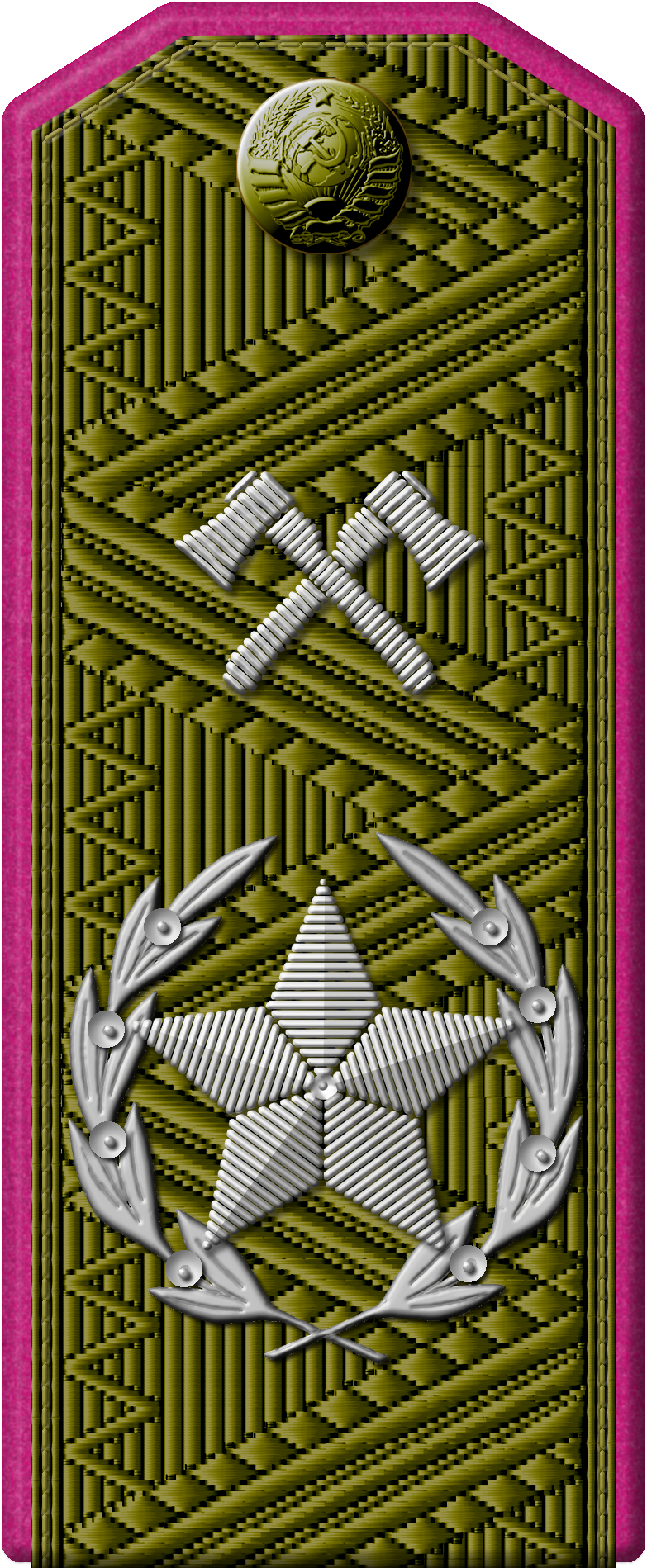
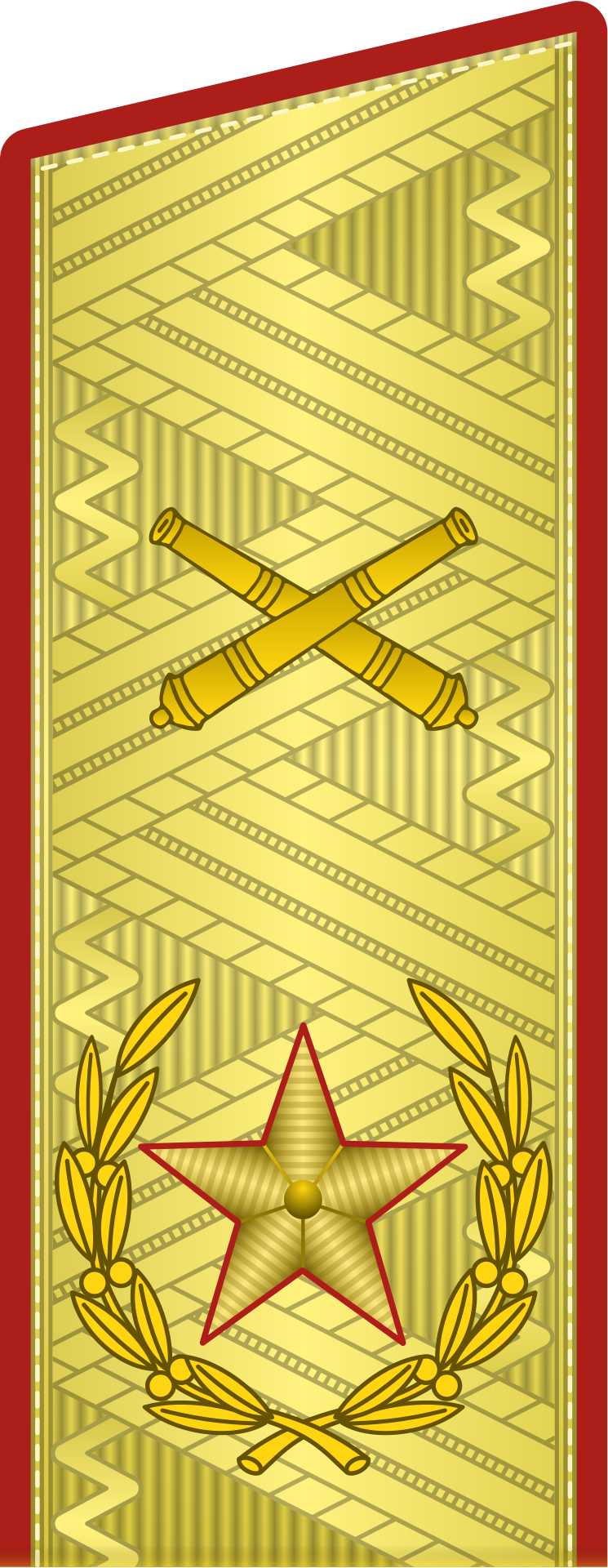
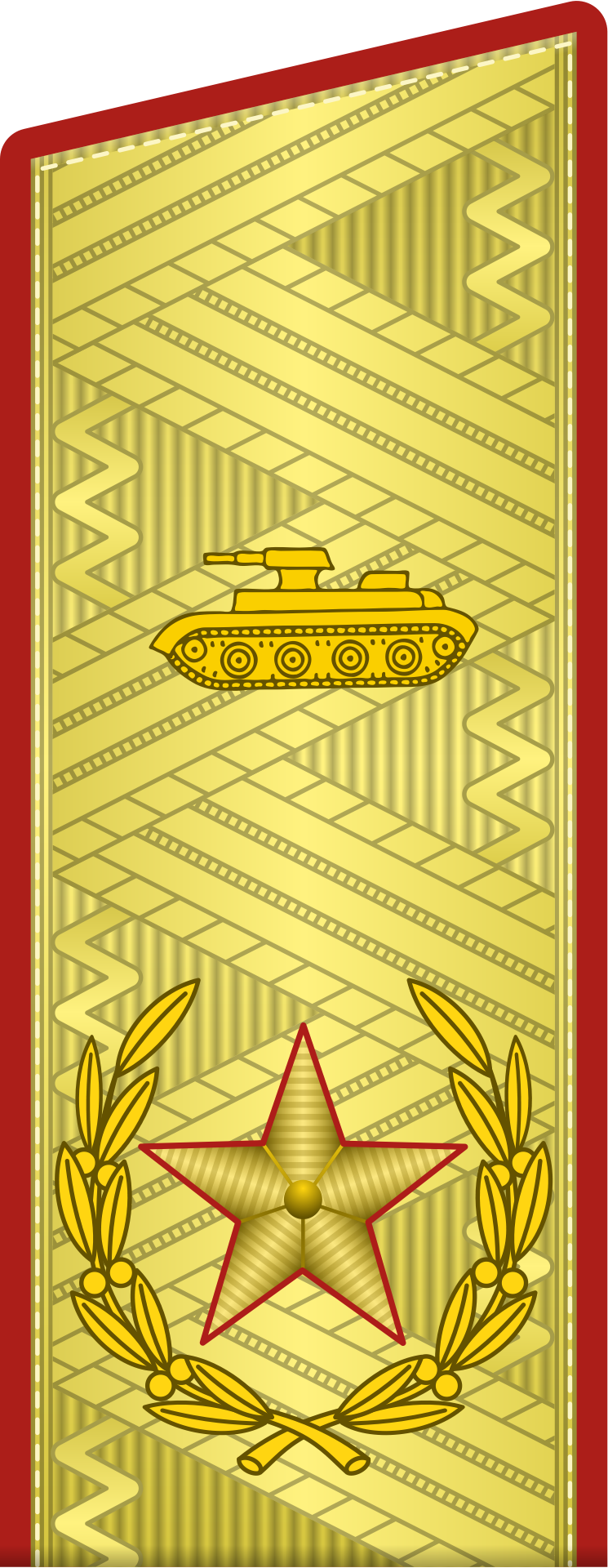
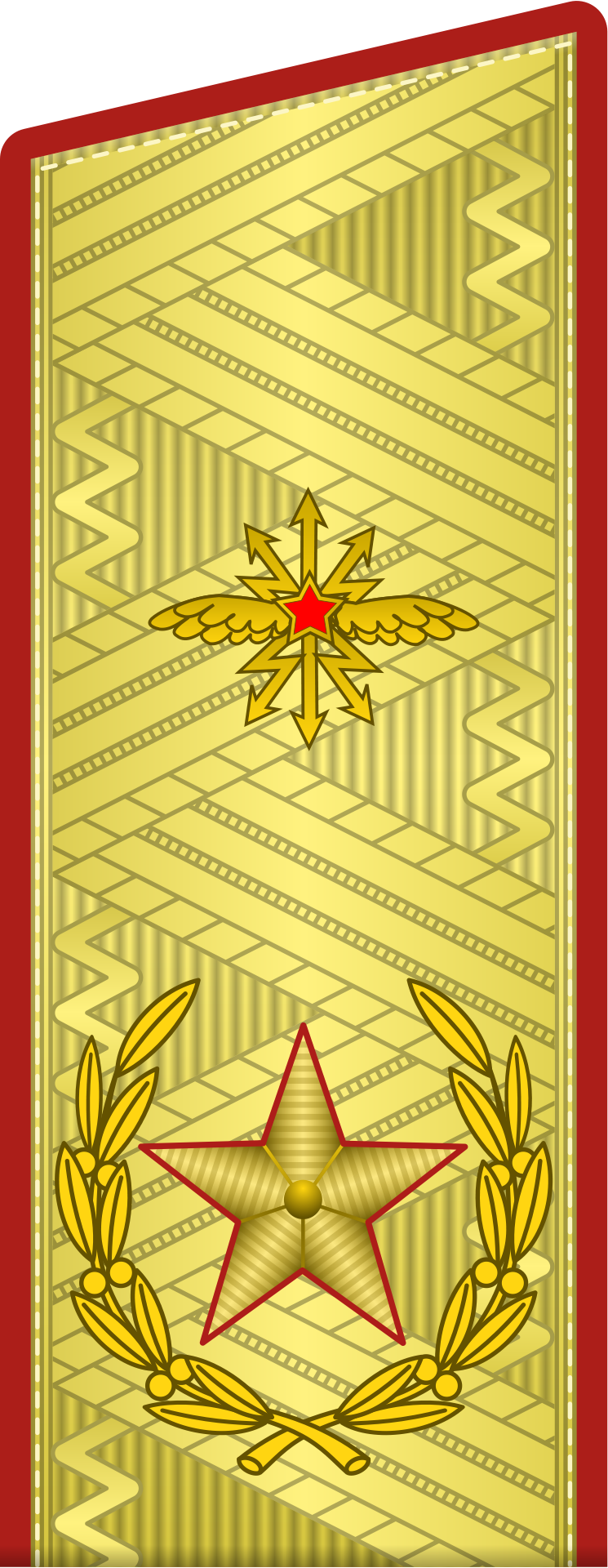
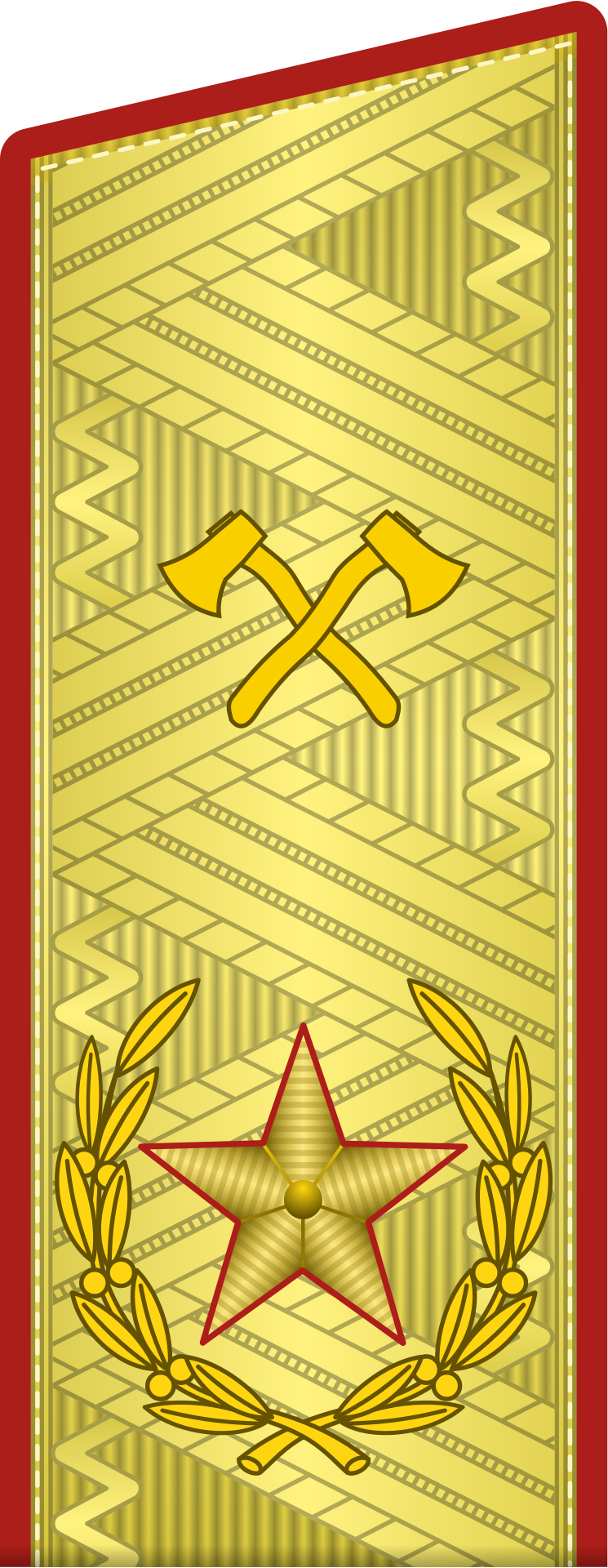
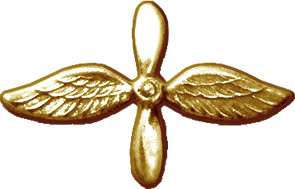
Designation	Chief marshal of a branch
... to uniform basic/ field	Shoulder boards 1943–1955
... to service / field uniform
... to dress uniform	Shoulder boards 1955–1974
Russian designation	Главный маршал артиллерии	Главный маршал авиации	Главный маршал бронетанковых войск	Главный маршал войск связи	Главный маршал инженерных войск
English designation	Chief marshal of artillery	Chief marshal of aviation	Chief marshal of armored troops	Chief marshal of signal troops	Chief marshal of engineer troops
Emblem

== List of chief marshals ==
=== Chief marshals of the artillery ===
1. Nikolai Nikolaevich Voronov appointed 21 February 1944.
2. Mitrofan Ivanovich Nedelin appointed 8 May 1959.
3. Sergey Sergeyevich Varentsov appointed 6 May 1961.
4. Vladimir Fedorovich Tolubko appointed 25 March 1983.

=== Chief marshals of the aviation ===
1. Alexander Alexandrovich Novikov appointed 21 February 1944; served as commander of the Soviet Air Force from 1942 to 1946.
2. Alexander Evgenievich Golovanov appointed 19 August 1944.
3. Pavel Fedorovich Zhigarev appointed 11 March 1955; served as commander of the Soviet Air Force from 1949 to 1957.
4. Konstantin Andreevich Vershinin appointed 8 May 1959; served as commander of the Soviet Air Force from 1957 to 1969.
5. Pavel Stepanovich Kutakhov appointed March 1972; served as commander of the Soviet Air Force from 1969 to 1984.
6. Boris Pavlovich Bugaev appointed 1977; served as Minister of Civil Aviation of the USSR from 1970 to 1987.
7. Alexander Ivanovich Koldunov appointed 1984; served as commander of Soviet Air Defence Forces from 1978 to 1987.

=== Chief marshals of the armored troops ===
1. Pavel Alexeevich Rotmistrov appointed 28 April 1962.
2. Hamazasp Khachaturovich Babadzhanian appointed 29 April 1975.

== See also ==
- Marshal of the Soviet Union
- Marshal of the branch
- Military ranks of the Soviet Union (1943–1955)
- Military ranks of the Soviet Union (1955–1991)
