= Vasily Mishin =

Soviet aerospace engineer

- Василий Мишин
- Born: Vasily Pavlovich Mishin; 18 January 1917; Byvalino, Bogorodsky Uyezd, Moscow Governorate, Russian Empire
- Died: 10 October 2001 (aged 84); Moscow, Russia
- Citizenship: Russia
- Education: Moscow Aviation Institute
- Engineering career
- Discipline: Engineering (mechanics)
- Employer: Soviet space program

Vasily Pavlovich Mishin (Russian: Василий Павлович Мишин; 18 January 1917 – 10 October 2001) was a Russian engineer in the former Soviet Union, and a prominent rocket pioneer, best remembered for the failures in the Soviet space program that took place under his management.

== Biography ==
Mishin was born in Byvalino in the Bogorodsky Uyezd, and studied mathematics at the Moscow Aviation Institute.

Mishin was one of the first Soviet specialists to see Nazi Germany's V-2 facilities at the end of World War II, along with others such as Sergei Korolev, who preceded him as the OKB-1 design bureau head, and Valentin Glushko, who succeeded him.

Mishin worked with Korolev as his deputy in the Experimental Design Bureau working on projects such as the development of the first Soviet ICBM as well in the Sputnik and Vostok programs. He became head of Korolev's OKB-1 design bureau and was the Chief Designer after Korolev's death in 1966, during surgery to remove a tumor from Korolev's colon. He inherited the N1 rocket program, intended to land a man on the Moon, but which turned out to be fatally flawed (largely due to lack of adequate funding).

N1 development began on 14 September 1956, a decade before Mishin took control. It was selected for a lunar landing mission, which required a design capable of putting ninety-five tons of cargo into orbit, up from fifty and later seventy-five ton requirements earlier in development. Under Korolev, a precedent of forgoing much of the usual ground testing had been begun. According to Korolev, this was because proper facilities would not be funded, and it would also allow for earlier test flights. Some of the failures Mishin faced during his leadership could have been avoided if further testing had been conducted at this stage. To handle engine failures, the KORD system was created under Mishin. To prevent the rocket from having uneven flight that would result from the unbalanced thrust caused by a malfunctioning motor, the faulty motor and the motor opposite it in the rocket base would be turned off. KORD would also make the calculations necessary to compensate for the missing motors, which would allow the same flight path to be maintained.

The N1, despite its necessity for planned missions, was never successfully flown. The first test flight, on 3 February 1969, had internal plumbing issues which led to a fire one minute in. It did, however, demonstrate the KORD system working successfully as well as proper deployment of the ejection safety system. The second launch, on July 3, experienced failure seconds after ignition, causing the rocket to fall back on the Launchpad and create significant damage. The third N1 launch occurred on 22 June 1971, after improvements were made to KORD, the cabling, and fuel pumps, and the addition of an extinguishment system and filters. Before the launch, the individual engines were further tested and the Launchpad was repaired. For the first time all thirty engines of the first stage fired successfully, which was the cause of the failure of the flight. When all engines fired together, it created unexpectedly high roll (rotation along the axis of thrust), which was beyond the strength of the compensating vernier engines, designed to keep stable flight. This was another failure that might have been prevented with proper ground testing.

For the fourth and what would become the final flight of the N1, further refinements were made, including four additional vernier engines, additional heat shielding for internal components, a new digital control system, and additional sensors paired with a high speed relay system. The Soviet Space program was now eyeing creating a base on the Moon, but first needed to finally succeed with this design. The launch was on 23 November 1972, with a Mishin approved flight plan to orbit the Moon forty-two times, with flight activities such as taking pictures of future landing sites, before returning to Earth on December 4. The rocket preceded farther than its predecessors, but shortly before the first stage was to separate one engine caught fire, causing the entire structure to explode, but not before the escape system activated.

Despite his skills in rocketry, Mishin was not known as an able administrator. He is often blamed for the failure of the program to put a man on the Moon, and faced criticisms for his alcohol consumption. He was described by Soviet Premier Nikita Khrushchev as "not [having] the slightest idea how to cope with the many thousands of people, the management of whom had been loaded onto his shoulders, nor make the huge irreversible government machine work for him."

In May 1967, Yuri Gagarin and Alexei Leonov criticised Mishin's "poor knowledge of the Soyuz spacecraft and the details of its operation, his lack of cooperation in working with the cosmonauts in flight and training activities" and asked Nikolai Kamanin for him to be cited in the official report into the Soyuz 1 crash, which killed Vladimir Komarov. Leonov described Mishin as "hesitant, uninspiring, poor at making decisions, over-reluctant to take risks and bad at managing the cosmonaut corps" Other failures during his term of leadership were the deaths of the Soyuz 11 crew, the loss of three space stations, and computer failures in four probes sent to Mars.

On 15 May 1974, while he was in the hospital, Mishin was replaced by a rival, Chief Engine Designer Valentin Glushko, after all four N1 test launches failed.

He continued his educational and research works as the head of rocket department of Moscow Aviation Institute.

Vasily Mishin was awarded the title Hero of Socialist Labour for his work with the Soviet space program in 1956.

He died in Moscow on 10 October 2001 at the age of 84.

His diaries, containing information on the program from 1960 to 1974, were purchased by the Perot Foundation in 1993. In 1997 a small part of the collection was donated to the National Air and Space Museum to be put on display, and in 2004 copies were donated to NASA.

== Literature ==
- "Rockets and people" – B. E. Chertok, M: "mechanical engineering", 1999. ISBN 5-217-02942-0 (in Russian)
- "Testing of rocket and space technology - the business of my life" Events and facts - A.I. Ostashev, Korolyov, 2001.;
- A.I. Ostashev, Sergey Pavlovich Korolyov - The Genius of the 20th Century — 2010 M. of Public Educational Institution of Higher Professional Training MGUL ISBN 978-5-8135-0510-2.
- "Melua, A.I." " Rocket technology, cosmonautics and artillery. Biographies of scientists and specialists.- 2nd ed., supplement, St. Petersburg: "Humanistics", 2005. С. 355. ISBN 5-86050-243-5
- "Bank of the Universe" - edited by Boltenko A. C., Kyiv, 2014., publishing house "Phoenix", ISBN 978-966-136-169-9
- Vasily Mishin //Family history
- "S. P. Korolev. Encyclopedia of life and creativity" - edited by C. A. Lopota, RSC Energia. S. P. Korolev, 2014 ISBN 978-5-906674-04-3
- "Russia interrupted flight" - Ivanchenko Y. C., M., 2010 publishing house "Restart",
- "We grew hearts in Baikonur" - Author: Eliseev V. I. M: publisher OAO MPK in 2018, ISBN 978-5-8493-0415-1
- "Space science city Korolev" - Author: Posamentir R. D. M: publisher SP Struchenevsky O. V., ISBN 978-5-905234-12-5
- "I look back and have no regrets. " - Author: Abramov, Anatoly Petrovich: publisher "New format" Barnaul, 2022. ISBN 978-5-00202-034-8
