= Nedelin catastrophe =

1960 fatal Soviet launch pad disaster

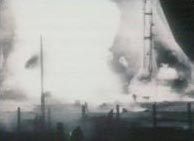
- The explosion
- Native name: Катастрофа на космодроме Байконур
- English name: The Catastrophe at Baikonur Cosmodrome
- Date: 24 October 1960
- Time: 18:45
- Venue: Baikonur Cosmodrome
- Location: Kazakh SSR, Soviet Union; 45.97542°N 63.65982°E
- Also known as: Nedelin disaster
- Type: Rocket explosion
- Cause: Premature ignition of the second-stage engine
- Organised by: Soviet Strategic Missile Troops
- Deaths: 78 (1994 state commission)

The Nedelin catastrophe or Nedelin disaster, known in Russia as the Catastrophe at Baikonur Cosmodrome (Russian: Катастрофа на Байконуре, romanized: Katastrofa na Baikonure), was a launch-pad accident that occurred on 24 October 1960 at the Baikonur Cosmodrome in the Kazakh SSR, during preparations for the first test flight of a prototype R-16 intercontinental ballistic missile. The missile's second-stage engine ignited while it was still on the pad, rupturing the first stage and causing a fire and explosion among military and technical personnel gathered around the fuelled missile. The Soviet authorities suppressed information about the disaster for decades and falsely reported that Chief Marshal of Artillery Mitrofan Ivanovich Nedelin, head of the R-16 development programme, had died in an air crash. A 1994 state commission report gave the death toll as 78, including 74 killed at the site and four who later died in hospital; other estimates have varied. The accident is commonly described as the deadliest launch accident associated with rocket or spaceflight activity, although the R-16 was being tested as a military missile.

== Launch preparations ==
On 23 October 1960, the prototype R-16 intercontinental ballistic missile had been installed on launching pad 41 (Russian: стартовая позиция 41) awaiting final tests before launch. The R-16 formed part of the Soviet effort to field a more practical strategic missile than the earlier R-7, whose liquid-oxygen oxidiser made long-term launch readiness difficult. The missile was over 30 metres (98 ft) long, 3.0 metres (9.8 ft) in diameter and had a launch weight of 141 tons. The rocket was fuelled with the hypergolic pair of UDMH as fuel and RFNA as the oxidiser—nicknamed "Devil's venom"—which was used because of the high boiling temperatures and hence storability of the fuel and oxidiser, despite being extremely corrosive and toxic. These risks were accounted for in the safety requirements of the launch procedures, but Nedelin's insistence on achieving a test launch ahead of the 7 November 1960 anniversary of the Bolshevik Revolution resulted in extreme schedule pressure, in a context of substantial emerging engineering difficulties. Ultimately, pre-launch tests began to overlap with launch preparations.

== Accident ==
During pre-launch testing, a fault in the replaced main sequencer caused the second-stage engine to fire while the missile was still on the pad. This ruptured the first stage directly below, causing an explosion that destroyed the missile. Before seeking refuge, the camera operator remotely activated automatic cameras set around the launching pad that filmed the explosion in detail.

People near the rocket were instantly incinerated; those farther away were burned to death or poisoned by the toxic fuel component vapors. Andrei Sakharov described many details: as soon as the engine fired, most of the personnel there ran to the perimeter, but were trapped inside the barbed-wire security fence and then engulfed in the fireball of burning fuel. The explosion incinerated or asphyxiated Nedelin, a top aide, the USSR's top missile-guidance designer, and over 70 other officers and engineers. Still others died later of burns or poisoning. Missile designer Mikhail Yangel survived only because he had left to smoke a cigarette behind a bunker a few hundred metres away, but nonetheless suffered burn injuries.

=== Causes and contributing factors ===
Later analyses distinguish the immediate technical trigger from the conditions that made the accident catastrophic. Chertok attributed the premature ignition to an erroneous electrical sequence in the control system after work on the main sequencer, while later safety analysis has treated the disaster as a wider failure of controls, procedures and management around a fuelled missile. The missile remained on the pad while troubleshooting and launch preparations overlapped, and personnel who should have been in protected positions were gathered near the vehicle. Schedule pressure to complete the first R-16 launch before the 7 November anniversary of the Bolshevik Revolution contributed to the erosion of normal safety margins.

=== Casualties ===
The first Western reporting of the accident via the Italian Continentale News Agency in December 1960 said that 100 people were killed, while The Guardian reported in 1965, citing information from spy Oleg Penkovsky who had passed information to the West, that as many as 300 had died. The Soviet Union said only that a "significant number" had died when it first acknowledged the incident in a 1989 Ogoniok article, but later in the year, the government put the number of dead at 54. The most recent estimated death toll, released by Roscosmos on the 50th anniversary of the accident and originating with agency engineer Boris Chertok, was that 126 people had died, but the agency qualified the number by saying that the actual number could be anywhere from 60 to 150 dead. According to results of a 1994 report by a state commission, casualties totaled 78 people, of which 74 died on site, and 4 succumbed to their injuries in the hospital later.

== Aftermath ==
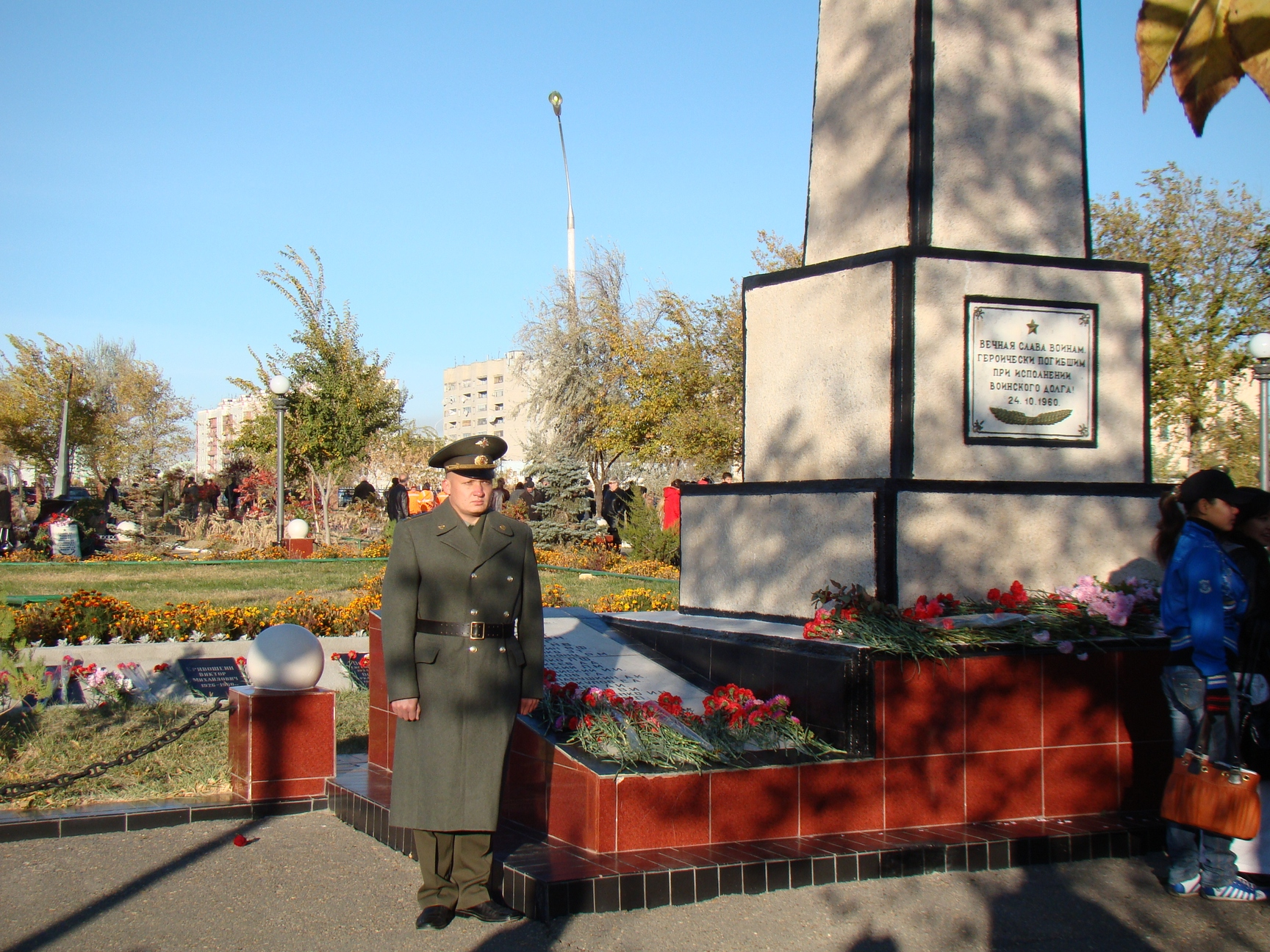
A honour guard at the tomb for those killed during the test R-16 on 24 October 1960, the city of Baikonur

Complete secrecy was immediately imposed on the events of 24 October 1960 by Nikita Khrushchev. A news release stated that Nedelin had died in a plane crash and the families of the other engineers were advised to say their loved ones had died of the same cause. Khrushchev also ordered Leonid Brezhnev to head an investigation commission and go to the site. Among other things, the commission found that many more people were present on the launch pad than should have been—most were supposed to be safely offsite in bunkers.

When Brezhnev arrived at the firing range on 25 October 1960, he said: "Comrades! We do not intend to put anyone on trial; we are going to investigate the causes and take actions to recover from the disaster and continue operations". Despite this, I. A. Doroshenko was held accountable for the event.

Afterwards, when Nikita Khrushchev asked Yangel, "But why have you remained alive?", Yangel answered in a trembling voice, "Walked away for a smoke. It's all my fault". Yangel later suffered a heart attack and was off work for months.

After the committee presented its report, the R-16 programme resumed in January 1961 with its first successful flight on 2 February 1961. The accident delayed but did not end Yangel's missile work. The R-16 remained part of the Soviet competition to develop more capable intercontinental ballistic missiles.

A memorial to the victims of the test was erected in the first half of the 1960s in the Park of Baikonur and is still visited by RKA officials before any manned launch.

Another fatal accident, with the R-9 missile, occurred at Baikonur exactly three years after the Nedelin catastrophe, causing 24 October to be referred to as Baikonur's "Black Day." No launches have been attempted on that date at Baikonur ever since.

== Official acknowledgement ==
A news release stated that Nedelin had died "in a plane crash while on an undisclosed mission". The Italian news agency Continentale first reported on 8 December 1960, from undisclosed sources, that Marshal Nedelin and 100 people had been killed in a rocket explosion. The Guardian reported on 16 October 1965 that captured spy Oleg Penkovsky had confirmed details of the missile accident, and exiled scientist and Soviet dissident Zhores Medvedev provided further details in 1976 in the British weekly magazine New Scientist. A declassified 1965 CIA report, discussed by Dwayne Day, treated reports of a Soviet missile disaster as broadly credible while rejecting claims that the accident involved nuclear propulsion. The report connected the claims with evidence of an unsuccessful ICBM launch attempt on 23–24 October 1960 and unusual post-accident activity connected with Tyuratam and Dnepropetrovsk. The Soviet Union did not acknowledge the events publicly until 16 April 1989, when a report appeared in the weekly newsmagazine Ogoniok.

== See also ==
- 1980 Damascus Titan missile explosion
- 1980 Plesetsk launch pad disaster
- Intelsat 708 – 1996 launch failure, which killed an unknown number of people in the worst space launch disaster since Nedelin
- 2003 Alcântara VLS explosion

== General bibliography ==
- Chertok, Boris; Rockets and People: Fili-Podlipki-Tyuratam; Moscow, 1996; published by Mashinostroyeniye Publishing House (in Russian)
- Chertok, Boris; Rockets and People, Volume 2: Creating a Rocket Industry, 2006; published by NASA ISBN 0-16-076672-9
- Eliseev, V. I. M. We grew hearts in Baikonur. OAO MPK in 2018; ISBN 978-5-8493-0415-1
- Harford, James; Korolev – How One Man Masterminded the Soviet Drive to Beat America to the Moon; John Wiley & Sons, Inc.; New York, 1997; pp. 119–120 ISBN 0-471-14853-9
- «At risk» – A. A. Toul, Kaluga, "the Golden path", 2001. ISBN 5-7111-0333-1
- Khrushchev, Sergei; Nikita Khrushchev and the Creation of a Superpower; Pennsylvania State University Press, Pennsylvania, 2000; Translated by Shirley Benson; pp. 416–425
- Kuznetsk, M. I. Baikonur. Korolev. Yangel. Voronezh: IPF "Voronezh" 1997; ISBN 5-89981-117-X
- Ostashev, A. I. "Testing of rocket and space technology – the business of my life"; Korolyov, 2001. Events and facts.
- Sheehan, Neil; A Fiery Peace in a Cold War; Random House; New York, 2009; p. 405.
