= Yevgeny Ostashev =

Russian engineer

- Born: Evgeny Ilyich Ostashev; 22 March 1924; Village Maly Vasilyev, Noginsky District, Moscow Oblast, USSR
- Died: 24 October 1960 (aged 36); Baikonur, Kazakh SSR, USSR

Yevgeny Ilyich Ostashev (Russian: Евгений Ильич Осташев; 22 March 1924 – 24 October 1960) was a combat engineer, test pilot of rocket and space technology, participant in the launch of the first artificial Earth satellite, head of the 1st control polygon NIIP-5 (Baikonur), Lenin Prize winner, candidate of Technical Sciences, and engineer-podpolkovnik.

== Biography ==
Ostashev was born on 22 March 1924 in the village Maly Vasilyev, Noginsky District, Moscow Oblast, USSR. In 1941, he entered the Moscow Aviation Institute, but after the outbreak of war, he refused to evacuate to Alma-Ata along with the rest of the institute's staff, deciding instead to work at a local factory as a turner until he was drafted into the Red Army in the summer of 1942. He was drafted into the army in the summer of 1942, became a cadet of the Leningrad artillery school. After six months of training in the rank of second lieutenant, he was sent to the Stalingrad Front as a commander of a communications platoon in a mortar company.

He fought as part of the unit which was part of the 1st Ukrainian front under the command of the Century V.I. Chuikov. The commander of the mortar platoon took part in the Korsun-Shevchenko operation, in the battles on the Dniester, near Vitebsk as part of the 1st Belorussian front. In the operation to take Berlin, he participated as a commander of a mortar company. At the end of the war, he remained in the occupation of Germany.

In 1949 he entered the 6th Department of the Artillery Academy named after F. E. Dzerzhinsky on a speciality missiles. In the spring of 1955 graduated with honors, from the proposals remain in the graduate refused. Was appointed Deputy chief of the Department of complex tests of rockets R-7 (11-th Department) to the landfill NIIP-5 of the Ministry of defense of the USSR.

He passed training at the industrial enterprises and 4 STP, the NIIP-5 arrived trained specialist. In 11-th division headed the Department of tests management system (SU), automatics missiles knew not worse developers from OKB-1 and NII-885. Since the launch of the first satellite of the Earth, Yevgeny Ilyich has been fulfilling the duties of "shooting" from the military test site. In March 1960 he was appointed the first chief formed the 1st control NIIP-5 (military unit 44275) for testing and operation of rockets R-7, R-9 on low-boiling propellant components.

In the school years, together with his younger brother Arkady, under the leadership of the magazine Knowledge is power built a telescope with a 10-fold increase with the necessary bed and a mechanism of rotation in two planes, lenses for the eyepiece and the objective sent to the editorial Board of the jour nal free of charge. It observed the Moon, they dreamed of flying to the planets of the Solar System.

== Death ==
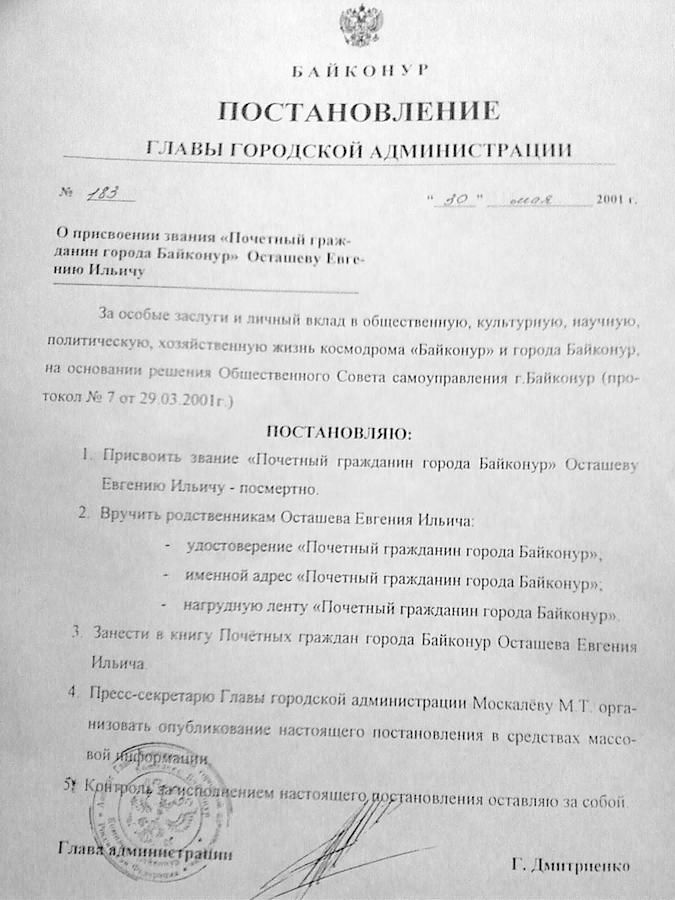
Honorary citizen of the city of Baikonur

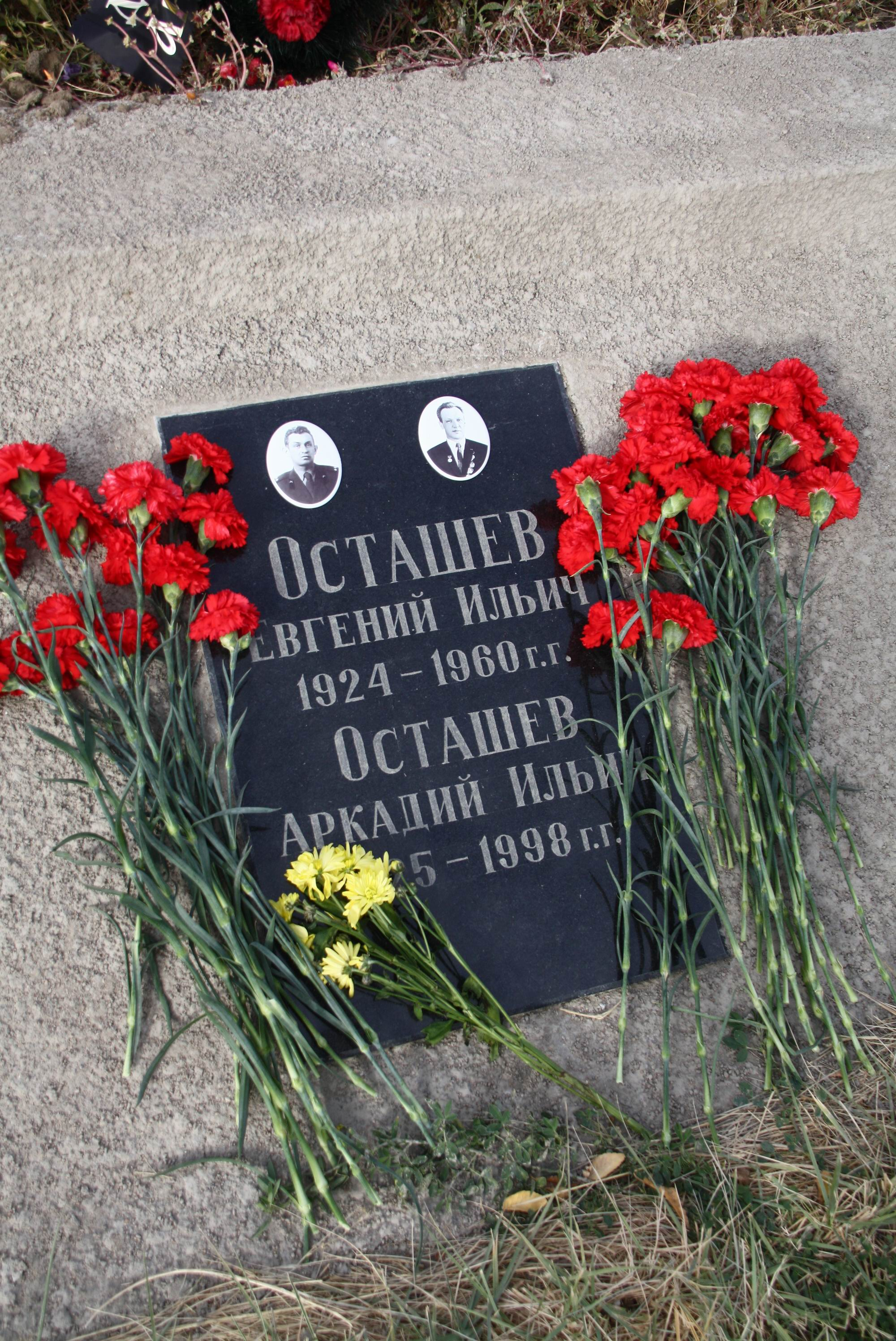
Baikonur, soldier's Park, tombstone of the grave of the Ostashev brothers

Ostashev died on 24 October 1960 in Baikonur at explosion of the missile R-16 during its preparation for the test launch on 41 site landfill. Tests of the R-16 engaged in the 2nd control NIIP-5, and Yevgeny Ilyich established in connection with failure of the rocket situation tried to provide assistance to their colleagues. Total killed 78 people. The incident was strictly classified (only in 1995 materials about the tragedy became available to all), it was officially announced about the death of only Chief Marshal of Artillery Nedelin, in a plane crash. From the memories younger brother Arkady Ostashev:

"...10 days before the death of Yevgeny I was at head of the polygon, the commander of the NIIP-5 Konstantin Vasilyevich Gerchik. He informed me that the order came on early assignment Eugene next rank of Colonel. Decided to tell him about it at the solemn meeting in honor of the 7 November. And before that, Eugene announced that he was appointed Deputy Director of NIIP-5 on scientific work instead A.I. Nosova, serving on service in Moscow..." (RGANTD. F. 33 op. 1 deeds 338 )

He is buried in Baikonur in the mass grave for victims of explosion of an Intercontinental ballistic missile R-16.

== Awards ==
- Lenin Prize
- Order of the Patriotic War 1st and 2nd class
- Order of the Red Star
- Medal "For Battle Merit"
- Order of Courage (posthumous)
- campaign and jubilee medals

== Memory ==
Name Ostasheva is one of the streets of Baikonur. In the museum at site No. 2 of the Baikonur cosmodrome organized an exposition dedicated to him. The decree of the Head of the city administration, Baikonur (city) № 183 of 30 May 2001 E. I. Ostashevu awarded the title of honorary citizen of the city of Baikonur. In Elektrougli Noginsk district of Moscow region in the regional Museum there is a booth dedicated to the brothers Осташевым. On the house number 17 in the village of Small Vasilyev, where they lived in childhood brothers Осташевы, a memorial plaque. In the city Park city Elektrougli a memorial plate to the head of test management Baikonur – Ostashev E. I. In the Museum of the strategic missile forces in Vlasikha, Moscow hosted the exhibition is devoted to E. I. Ostaszewo in the sections on world war II and the development of space industry in the country.

== Literature ==
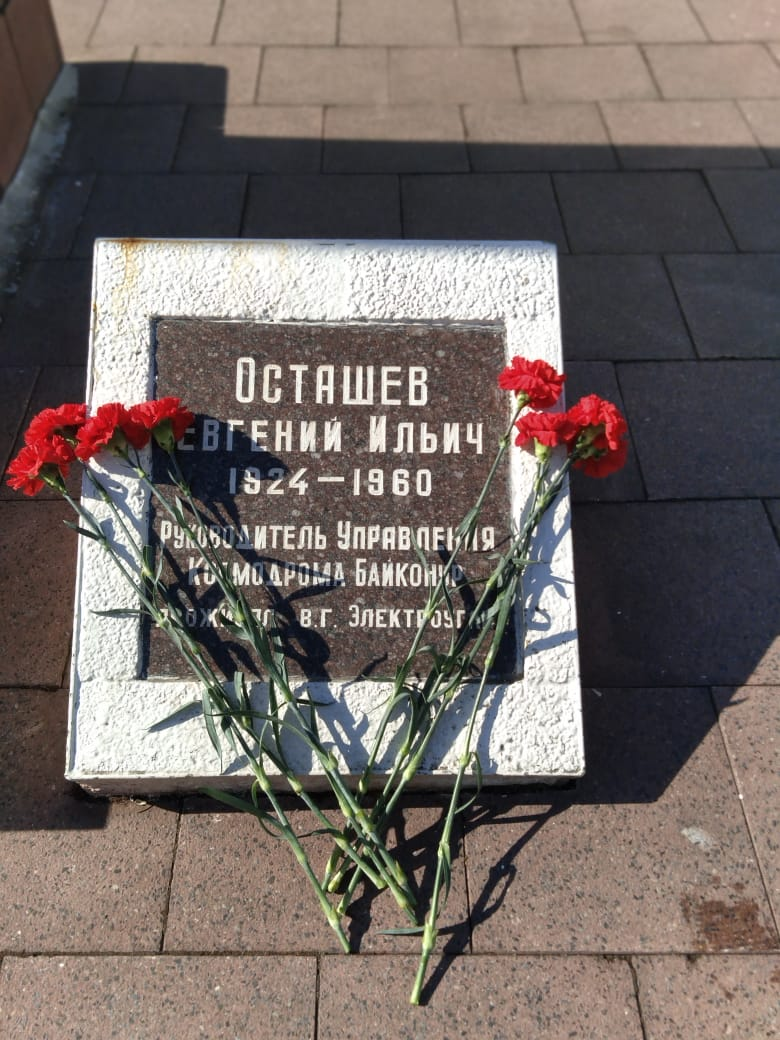
A memorial plaque in the Park, Elektrougli the head of test management Baikonur – Ostaszewo E. I.

- "Korolev: Facts and myths" – J. K. Golovanov, M: Nauka, 1994. ISBN 5-02-000822-2
- "Rockets and people" (in 4 books) – B. E. Chertok, M: "mechanical engineering", 1999. ISBN 5-217-02942-0 (in Russian);
- A breakthrough in space – Konstantin Vasilyevich Gerchik, M: LLC "Veles", 1994. ISBN 5-87955-001-X
- At risk – A. A. Toul, Kaluga, "the Golden path", 2001. ISBN 5-7111-0333-1
- "People duty and honor" – A. A. Shmelev, the second book. M: Editorial Board "Moscow journal", 1998.
- "Testing of rocket and space technology – the business of my life" Events and facts – A.I. Ostashev, Korolyov, 2001.
- "Baikonur. Korolev. Yangel." – M. I. Kuznetsk, Voronezh: IPF "Voronezh", 1997, ISBN 5-89981-117-X
- A.I. Ostashev, Sergey Pavlovich Korolyov – The Genius of the 20th Century — 2010 M. of Public Educational Institution of Higher Professional Training MGUL ISBN 978-5-8135-0510-2.
- "Look back and look ahead. Notes of a military engineer" – Rjazhsky A. A., 2004, SC. first, the publishing house of the "Heroes of the Fatherland" ISBN 5-91017-018-X.
- "Unknown Baikonur" – edited by B. I. Posysaeva, M.: "globe", 2001. ISBN 5-8155-0051-8
- "Melua, A.I." " Rocket technology, cosmonautics and artillery. Biographies of scientists and specialists.- 2nd ed., supplement, St. Petersburg: "Humanistics", 2005. С. 355. ISBN 5-86050-243-5
- "Rocket and space feat Baikonur" – Vladimir Порошков, the "Patriot" publishers 2007. ISBN 5-7030-0969-3
- "Bank of the Universe" – edited by Boltenko A. C., Kyiv, 2014., publishing house "Phoenix", ISBN 978-966-136-169-9
- "Nesterenko" series Lives of great people – Authors: Gregory Sukhina A., Ivkin, Vladimir Ivanovich, publishing house "Young guard" in 2015, ISBN 978-5-235-03801-1
- "To stand on the way to space" – Author: Valentin Lebedev, M: publisher ITRK in 2016, ISBN 978-5-88010-400-0
- "We grew hearts in Baikonur" – Author: Eliseev V. I. M: publisher OAO MPK in 2018, ISBN 978-5-8493-0415-1
- "Flight tests of rocket and space technology. Time. Spaceports. People. " - Author: Posysaev Boris Ivanovich Mozhaisk: publisher Mozhaisk printing plant, 2020. ISBN 978-5-6043606-9-9
- "I look back and have no regrets. " - Author: Abramov, Anatoly Petrovich: publisher "New format" Barnaul, 2022. ISBN 978-5-00202-034-8
