= Peter the Great Military Academy of the Strategic Missile Forces =

Military academy

Coordinates: 55.7859°N 37.9714°E

- Военная академия РВСН имени Петра Великого
- Great emblem
- Type: Academy
- Established: 1820
- Director: Lieutenant General Andrey Burbin
- Language: russian
- Website: varvsn.mil.ru

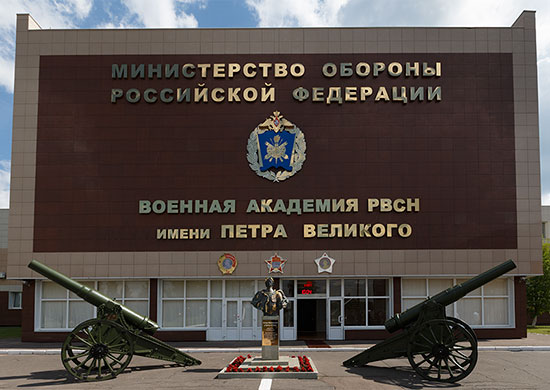
The academy building.

The Peter the Great Military Academy of the Strategic Missile Forces (Note: Russian: Военная академия Ракетных войск стратегического назначения имени Петра Великого, romanized: Voyennaya akademiya Raketnykh voysk strategicheskogo naznacheniya imeni Petra Velikogo) is a military academy that serves personnel of the Strategic Missile Forces of the Russian Armed Forces. Since 2015, it has been located in the municipality of Balashikha in the Moscow Oblast. The academy is subordinate to the Commander of the Strategic Missile Forces.

== History ==
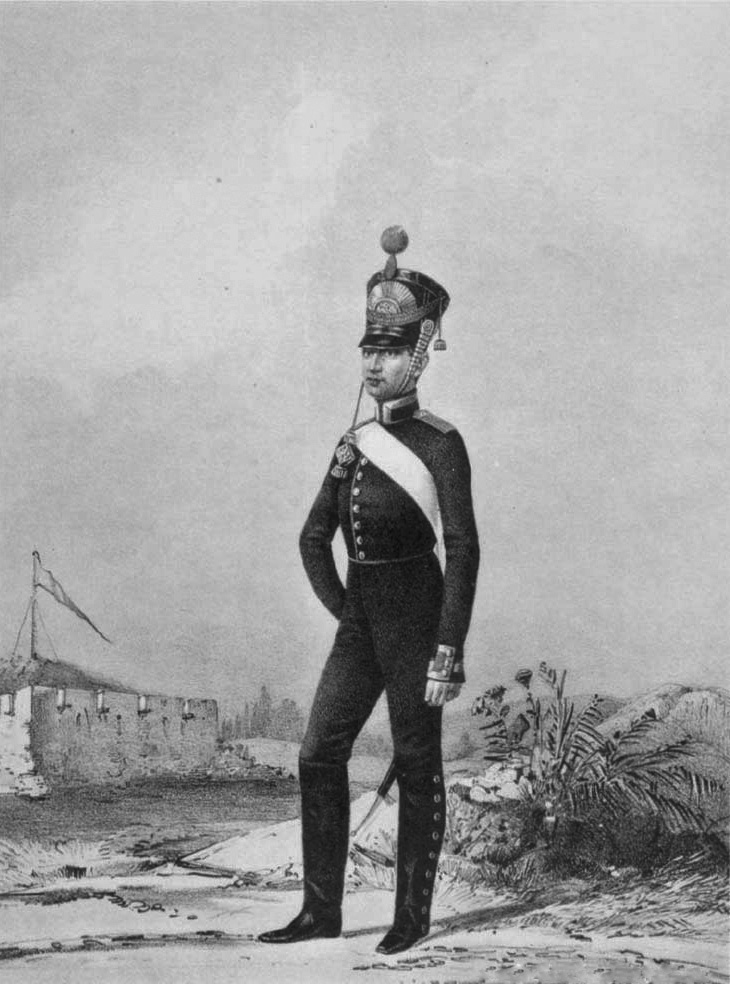
A Junker of the Artillery Academy.

The history of the Strategic Missile Forces (RVSN) is linked with the history of the academy, being one of the oldest military educational institutions in Russia. The educational institution traces its history back to the Artillery School of the Imperial Russian Army, which was opened in St. Petersburg at the initiative of Grand Duke Michael Pavlovich in 1820. In 1845 the school was given the honorific of Mikhailovsky after the Grand Duke. In 1925, it became the Red Army's Military-Technical Academy. In 1934, it became the Felix Dzerzhinsky Artillery Academy and four years later, it was transferred to Moscow. During the Second World War, it was stationed in the city of Samarkand in the Uzbek SSR. In August 1944, the Department of Rocket Weapons was created with a training laboratory for the training of missilemen. It was later transformed into the Faculty of Rocket Weapons of the artillery academy, which laid the foundation for the domestic education of rocket engineers. In 1958, it return to its Moscow facilities from before the war. In March 1960, the academy became part of the Strategic Missile Forces of the Soviet Army. It was renamed twice under Soviet rule, (as the Dzerzhinsky Military Engineering Academy in 1963 and the Dzerzhinsky Military Academy in 1972).

Its Soviet era headquarters was at Kitayskiy Proyezd 9/5, within a block of the Rossiya Hotel off Red Square, with other sources also stating that it was based in the historical building of the Moscow Orphanage. In August 1997, President Boris Yeltsin, in a decree which outlined the need "to revive the historical traditions of the Russian Army and taking into account the exceptional merits of Peter the Great in the creation of a regular army", order the renaming of the academy after Tsar/Emperor of All Russia, Peter the Great. In 2015, the academy was relocated to the city of Balashikha in order to develop the existing and future infrastructure of the academy. The first stage of the new building's construction was completed in record time, 242 days to be exact.

== 200th anniversary ==
The academy marked its bicentennial in December 2020. The academy launched extensive preparations for the anniversary. By order of the academy head, an organizing committee was created under the leadership of the deputy head of the academy, Colonel Anatoly Rug. A program of ceremonial events was developed aimed at recreating the history of the institution. The celebrations include contributions from the faculty, graduates, veteran teachers, and family members. A column "200 years" has been created on the official website of the academy, which will included historical materials dedicated to the development of the academy.

== Structure ==
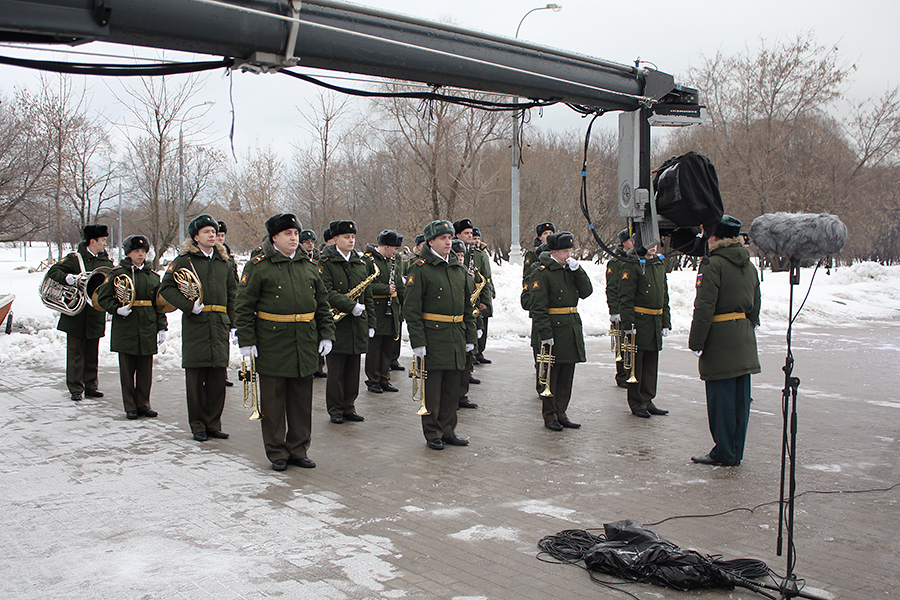
The academy band.

Currently, the academy implements more than 150 plans of advanced training and prepares officers for service in the Strategic Missile Forces, as well as service in the 12th Chief Directorate and the GRU (G.U.). Students of the academy become upon graduation the basis of the officer corps of the Strategic Missile Forces of the Soviet Union and Russia. The Strategic Missile Forces Academy has a training center located in the town of Balabanovo, Kaluga Region.

== Awards ==
- Order of Lenin (1938)
- Order of the October Revolution (1970)
- Order of Suvorov (1945)

== Heads ==
The following have served as heads of the school since 1953:

- Marshal Georgy Odintsov (1953–1969)
- Colonel General Fedor Tonkykh (1969–1985)
- Colonel General Mykola Kotlovtsev (1985—1988)
- Colonel General Yury Plotnikov (1989–1997)
- Colonel General Mykola Solovtsov (1997–2001)
- Colonel General Yury Kirilov (2001—2009)
- Lieutenant General Vladimir Zakharov 2009—2010)
- Lieutenant General Viktor Fedorov (2010—2016)
- Lieutenant General Sergei Siver (2016-2019)
- Major General Leonid Mikholap (interim) (2019–Present)

== Notable graduates ==
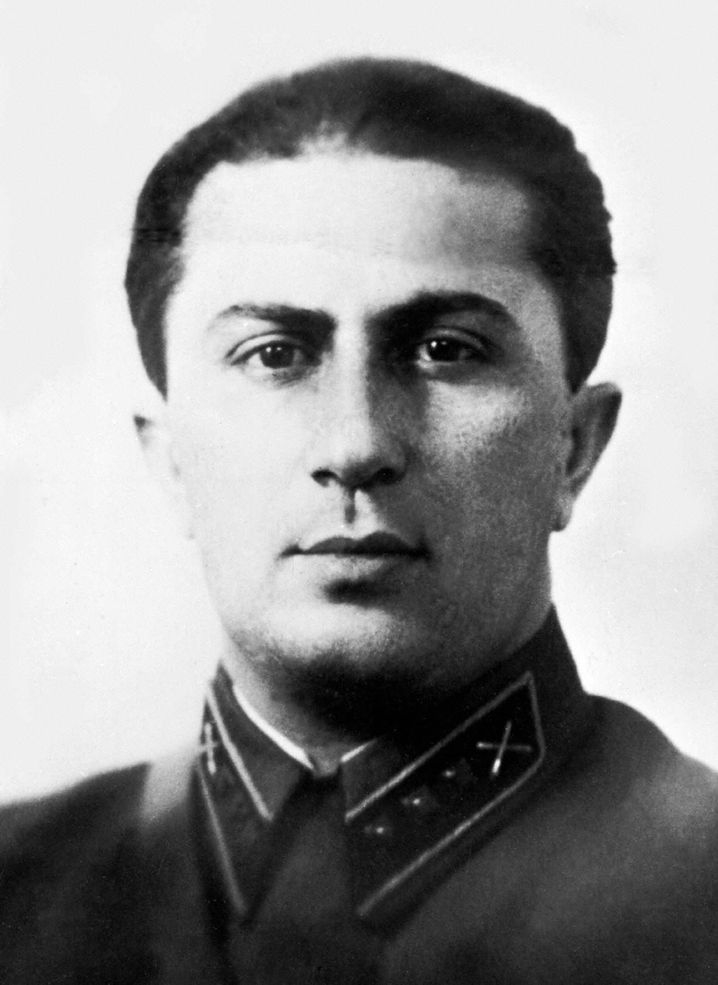
Yakov Dzhugashvili

Notable graduates include:

- Galaktion Alpaidze, chief of the Plesetsk rocket proving ground in 1963–1975.
- Vladimir Yakovlev, former RVSN commander.
- Konstantin Gerchik, former professor of the Academy of Military Sciences of Russia, and the second head of the Baikonur cosmodrome.
- Aleksandr Golovko, commander of the Russian Space Forces since 1 August 2015.
- Yakov Dzhugashvili, the eldest child of Joseph Stalin and his first wife, Kato Svanidze.
- Yevgeny Ostashev, test pilot of the Sputnik 1 and a casualty in the Nedelin catastrophe.
- Igor Bezler, a prominent commander in the early phases of the war in Donbas and the 2014 Russian invasion of Crimea.
- Pyotr Shafranov, former representative of the Supreme Commander of the Unified Armed Forces of the Warsaw Treaty Organization to the Hungarian People's Republic.
- Afanasy Shilin, an artillery officer who was awarded the title Hero of the Soviet Union twice for his actions during the Battle of the Dnieper and the Vistula-Oder Offensive.
- Josef Kotin, a general who lead the design of some of the Kliment Voroshilov tanks, the IS tank family, and the T-10 tank, among others.
- Vladimir Popovkin, a former General Director of the Russian Federal Space Agency and First Deputy Defense Minister of Russia.
- Igor Sergeyev, the only officer to hold the rank of Marshal of the Russian Federation
- Captain Ivan Flerov, the first to hold command of the Katyusha rocket launcher
- Anatoly Kitov, a pioneer of cybernetics in the Soviet Union.
- Tofig Aghahuseynov, a Soviet-Azerbaijani military leader

== See also ==
- School of Applied Artillery
