= Konstantin Gerchik =

Soviet Army general

Konstantin Vasilyevich Gerchik
- Константин Васильевич Герчик
- Born: 27 September 1918; Soroki, Slutsky Uyezd, Minsk Governorate, Russian SFSR
- Died: 24 June 2001 (aged 82); Moscow, Russia
- Military career
- Allegiance: Soviet Union
- Branch: Soviet Army
- Service years: 1938–1979
- Rank: Colonel-General
- Conflicts: World War II

Konstantin Vasilyevich Gerchik (Russian: Константин Васильевич Герчик, 27 September 1918 – 24 June 2001) was a Russian military officer who served in the Red Army and a program manager in the former Soviet space program. He was Colonel-General of the Soviet Army, Professor of the Academy of Military Sciences of Russia, a veteran of the Great Patriotic War, and the second head of the Baikonur Cosmodrome (1958–1961).

== Biography ==
Gerchik was born on 27 September 1918 in the village of Soroki (Slutsky Uyezd, Minsk). He joined the Red Army in 1938, then enrolled in the 2nd Leningrad Artillery School, graduating in 1940.

He took part in the battles of the Great Patriotic War from the first days. After the victory, Gerchik entered the Artillery Academy named after F. E. Dzerzhinsky, graduated from it, then taught General tactics and tactics of artillery in this school.

In 1957, Gerchik was appointed chief of staff of the Baikonur cosmodrome. On 2 July 1958, he became the head of the cosmodrome. On 8 May 1960, he was promoted to Major general.

== Accident at the cosmodrome ==
On 24 October 1960, in the time of the accident at the 41 site of the spaceport, Gerchik together with his Deputy, Alexander Mrykhin, a Lieutenant general subsequently a Hero of Socialist Labour was in the vicinity of the outbreak missiles R-16.

During the disaster, Chief marshal of the branch M. I. Nedelin and about 70 people were killed. Gerchik was saved from death by the body of the rocket, which blocked the flame from the working engines of the second stage to burn out the immediate vicinity of the rocket. Still Konstantin Vasilyevich got severe burns when he ran away from the burning rocket. After the incident, General Gerchik was in critical conditions, but survived, then for a long time he was treated in hospitals.

=== Further biography ===
After cure in 1961 K. V. Gerchik became the chief of the formed Central Command Post of Strategic Missile Forces (RVSN), at the same time he became the Deputy chief of the General staff RVSN for combat management. In 1963 he became the chief of staff of a missile army. In 1968, Gerchik was awarded the rank of [Lieutenant General] and in the same year he graduated from the Higher academic courses at Military Academy of the General staff.

Since 1972 he was the commander of the Smolensk missile army. In 1976 was promoted to the rank of Colonel general.

In 1979 he retired from the military. He worked in several scientific institutes, including the institutions of the USSR Academy of Sciences.

Since 1991 he is the Chairman of the Interregional Council of Baikonur Cosmodrome veterans.

In 1996, for his great personal contribution to the development of Russian cosmonautics K. V. Gerchik received official thanks from the President of Russian Federation .

He died on 24 June 2001 in Moscow and was buried at Troyekurovskoye Cemetery.

== Honours and awards ==
Soviet Union

	Order of Lenin, nine times (29 June 1960, 21 February 1974)
	Order of the October Revolution (February 21, 1978)
	Order of the Red Banner, (21 February 1942, 22 February 1968)
	Order of Kutuzov, 3rd class, (May 27, 1945)
	Order of the Patriotic War 1st class, (14 July 1943, 30 may 1945, 6 April 1985)
	Order of the Red Star (9 February 1943, 3 November 1953, 21 December 1957)
	Order of the Red Banner of Labour, (June 17, 1961)
	Medal of Zhukov
	Medal "For Battle Merit"
	Medal "For the Victory over Germany in the Great Patriotic War 1941–1945"
	Jubilee Medal "In Commemoration of the 100th Anniversary of the Birth of Vladimir Ilyich Lenin"
Other medals.

Foreign

Order of the White Lion, (Czechoslovakia)

== Publications ==
- "A breakthrough in space" – Konstantin Vasilyevich Gerchik, M: LLC "Veles", 1994. ISBN 5-87955-001-X
- K. V. Gerchik is the author of the article "the Triumph of Russian science and technology", which was referred to and is still referred to by the authors of works on cosmonautics.

== Literature ==
- "Rockets and people" – B. E. Chertok, M: "mechanical engineering", 1999. ISBN 5-217-02942-0 (in Russian)
- "The hidden space" – Nikolai Kamanin, М: "Инфортекс-ИФ, 1995.
- "Korolev: Facts and myths" – J. K. Golovanov, M: Nauka, 1994. ISBN 5-02-000822-2
- "People duty and honor" – A. A. Shmelev, "libris", 1996. ISBN 5-86568-133-3
- "People duty and honor" – A. A. Shmelev, the second book. M: Editorial Board "Moscow journal", 1998.
- "Testing of rocket and space technology – the business of my life" Events and facts – A.I. Ostashev, Korolyov, 2001.
- "Unknown Baikonur" – edited by B. I. Posysaeva, M.: "globe", 2001. ISBN 5-8155-0051-8
- "Top secret General" – E.T. Beloglazova, M: "the Heroes of the Fatherland", 2005. ISBN 5-98698-012-3
- "Melua, A.I." " Rocket technology, cosmonautics and artillery. Biographies of scientists and specialists.- 2nd ed., supplement, St. Petersburg: "Humanistics", 2005. С. 355. ISBN 5-86050-243-5
- "Rocket and space feat Baikonur" – Vladimir Порошков, the "Patriot" publishers 2007. ISBN 5-7030-0969-3
- A.I. Ostashev, Sergey Pavlovich Korolyov – The Genius of the 20th Century — 2010 M. of Public Educational Institution of Higher Professional Training MGUL ISBN 978-5-8135-0510-2.
- "Bank of the Universe" – edited by Boltenko A. C., Kiev, 2014., publishing house "Phoenix", ISBN 978-966-136-169-9
- "To stand on the way to space" – Author: Valentin Lebedev, M: publisher ITRK in 2016, ISBN 978-5-88010-400-0
- "We grew hearts in Baikonur" – Author: Eliseev V. I. M: publisher OAO MPK in 2018, ISBN 978-5-8493-0415-1
- "I look back and have no regrets. " - Author: Abramov, Anatoly Petrovich: publisher "New format" Barnaul, 2022. ISBN 978-5-00202-034-8
