= Ostashev =

Ostashev (masculine, Russian: Осташев) or Ostasheva (feminine, Russian: Осташева) is a Russian surname. Notable people with the surname include:

- Arkady Ostashev (1925–1998), Soviet–Russian engineer and space scientist
- Yevgeny Ostashev (1924–1960), Soviet–Russian missile scientist
