= RD-215 =

Rocket engine

RD-215 (РД-215)
- Country of origin: Soviet Union
- Date: 1958-1960
- Designer: OKB-456, V.Glushko
- Associated LV: R-14, Kosmos-3 and Kosmos-3M
- Status: Retired

Liquid-fuel engine
- Propellant: AK-27I / UDMH
- Mixture ratio: 2.5

Configuration
- Chamber: 2
- Nozzle ratio: 18.8

Performance
- Thrust, vacuum: 887 kN (199,000 lbf)
- Thrust, sea-level: 740 kN (170,000 lbf)
- Chamber pressure: 7.355 MPa (1,066.8 psi)
- Specific impulse, vacuum: 289 s (2.83 km/s)
- Specific impulse, sea-level: 246 s (2.41 km/s)

Dimensions
- Length: 2,205 mm (86.8 in)
- Diameter: 2,260 mm (89 in)
- Dry mass: 575 kg (1,268 lb)

Used in
- R-14, Kosmos-3 and Kosmos-3M first stage

The RD-215 (Russian: Ракетный Двигатель-215, romanized: Raketnyy Dvigatel-215, lit. 'Rocket Engine 215', GRAU index: 8D513) was a dual nozzle liquid-fuel rocket engine, burning a hypergolic mixture of unsymmetrical dimethylhydrazine (UDMH) fuel with AK-27 oxidizer (a mixture of 73% nitric acid and 27% dinitrogen tetroxide [N_{2}O_{4}] with iodine as a passivant). It was used in a module of two engines (four nozzles) known as the RD-216 (GRAU index: 8D514). The RD-215 was developed by OKB-456 for Yangel's Yuzhmash R-14 (8K65) ballistic missile. Its variations were also used on the Kosmos-1, Kosmos-3 and Kosmos-3M launch vehicles.

== Versions ==
The family incorporate many versions:

- RD-215 (GRAU index: 8D513): Original design for the R-14 (8K65). Used also on the Kosmos-1 and Kosmos-3
- RD-215U (GRAU index: 8D513U): Improved engine for the R-14U (8K65U).
- RD-215M (GRAU index: 8D513M): Improved version used on the Kosmos-3M.
- RD-218 (GRAU index: 8D515): Modified design for the R-16 (8K64) first stage.
- RD-219 (GRAU index: 8D713): Modified design for the R-16 (8K64) second stage.

== Modules ==
These engines were bundled into modules of pairs of engines. The serial production modules were:

- RD-216 (GRAU index: 8D514): Bundle of two RD-215, used on the R-14 (8K65), Kosmos-1 and Kosmos-3 first stage.
- RD-216U (GRAU index: 8D514U): Bundle of two RD-215U, used on the R-14U (8K65U) first stage.
- RD-216M (GRAU index: 8D514M): Bundle of two RD-215M, used on the Kosmos-3M first stage.
- RD-218 (GRAU index: 8D712): Bundle of three RD-217, powers the R-16 (8K64) first stage.

RD-215 Family of Engines
Engine	RD-215	RD-215U	RD-215M
GRAU	8D514	8D514U	8D514M
Development	1958-1960	1960-1961	1966-1968
Propellant	AK-27I (73% nitric acid, 27% N_{2}O_{4}, and iodine passivant) / UDMH		
Combustion chamber pressure	7.355 MPa (1,066.8 psi)		
Thrust, vacuum	887 kN (199,000 lbf)	887 kN (199,000 lbf)	890 kN (200,000 lbf)
Thrust, sea level	740 kN (170,000 lbf)	740 kN (170,000 lbf)	742.8 kN (167,000 lbf)
I_{sp}, vacuum	289 s (2.83 km/s)	289 s (2.83 km/s)	291.3 s (2.857 km/s)
I_{sp}, sea level	246 s (2.41 km/s)	246 s (2.41 km/s)	248 s (2.43 km/s)
Burn time	146s	N/A	N/A
Length	2,205 mm (86.8 in)	2,205 mm (86.8 in)	2,205 mm (86.8 in)
Diameter	2,260 mm (89 in)	2,260 mm (89 in)	2,260 mm (89 in)
Dry weight	575 kg (1,268 lb)	575 kg (1,268 lb)	570 kg (1,260 lb)
Use	R-14 (8K65), Kosmos-1 and Kosmos-3	R-14U (8K65U)	Kosmos-3M

== See also ==
- R-14 - Ballistic missile for which this engine was originally developed for.
- Kosmos-3 - launch vehicle that is uses an R-14 as first stage.
- Kosmos-3M - launch vehicle that is uses an R-14 as first stage.
- Rocket engine using liquid fuel
