= Kosmos-1 =

Soviet carrier rocket

- Function: Orbital carrier rocket
- Manufacturer: Yangel
- Country of origin: Soviet Union

Size
- Height: 26.3 metres (86 ft)
- Diameter: 2.4 metres (7.9 ft)
- Mass: 107,500 kilograms (237,000 lb)
- Stages: 2

Capacity

Payload to LEO
- Mass: 1,400 kilograms (3,100 lb)

Launch history
- Status: Retired
- Launch sites: Site 41/15, Baikonur
- Total launches: 8
- Success(es): 7
- Failure(s): 1
- First flight: 18 August 1964
- Last flight: 28 December 1965

First stage – R-14
- Powered by: 1 RD-216
- Maximum thrust: 1,740 kilonewtons (390,000 lbf)
- Specific impulse: 292 sec
- Burn time: 130 seconds
- Propellant: IRFNA/UDMH

Second stage – S3
- Powered by: 1 11D49
- Maximum thrust: 156 kilonewtons (35,000 lbf)
- Specific impulse: 303 sec
- Burn time: 375 seconds
- Propellant: IRFNA/UDMH

The Kosmos-1 (GRAU Index: 65S3, also known as Cosmos-1) was a Soviet carrier rocket (Kosmos (rocket family)), derived from the R-14 missile, which orbited satellites in 1964 and 1965. It served as an interim, and was quickly replaced by the Kosmos-3. Eight were flown, all launched from Site 41/15 at the Baikonur Cosmodrome.

Initial development was authorised in October 1961, leading to a maiden flight on 18 August 1964, carrying three Strela satellites. Strela-1 satellites were flown on seven flights, three on each of the first four and five on the next three. The eighth and final flight carried one. All flights were successful except the second.

== Launch history ==
Date and time (GMT)	Serial No.	Payload	Kosmos designations	Outcome
18 August 1964, 09:15	02L	3 x Strela-1	Kosmos 38; Kosmos 39; Kosmos 40	Success
23 October 1964	01L	3 x Strela-1	N/A	Failure (cause unknown)
21 February 1965, 11:00	03L	3 x Strela-1	Kosmos 54; Kosmos 55; Kosmos 56	Success
15 March 1965, 11:00	04L	3 x Strela-1	Kosmos 61; Kosmos 62; Kosmos 63	Success
16 July 1965, 03:31	05L	5 x Strela-1	Kosmos 71; Kosmos 72; Kosmos 73; Kosmos 74; Kosmos 75	Success
3 September 1965, 14:00	07LS	5 x Strela-1	Kosmos 80; Kosmos 81; Kosmos 82; Kosmos 83; Kosmos 84	Success
18 September 1965, 07:59	08LS	5 x Strela-1	Kosmos 86; Kosmos 87; Kosmos 88; Kosmos 89; Kosmos 90	Success
28 December 1965, 12:30	09LP	1 x Strela-2	Kosmos 103	Success

== See also ==
- Kosmos-2I
- Kosmos-3M
