= Chusovoy (disambiguation) =

Chusovoy (masculine), Chusovaya (feminine), or Chusovoye (neuter) may refer to:

- Chusovoy, a town in Perm Krai, Russia
- Chusovaya, a river in Russia
- Chusovaya (village), a village in Kurgan Oblast, Russia
- R-14 Chusovaya, a Soviet theatre ballistic missile
