= Arkady Ostashev =

Russian engineer in Soviet space program

- Born: Arkady Ilyich Ostashev; 30 September 1925; Maloye Vasilyevo, Noginsky District, Moscow Oblast, Soviet Union
- Died: 12 July 1998 (aged 72); Moscow, Russia
- Resting place: Baikonur (city)
- Citizenship: Russia
- Education: Moscow Aviation Institute
- Awards: Order of Lenin; Order of the Red Banner of Labour; Lenin Prize; USSR State Prize
- Engineering career
- Discipline: Engineering (mechanical)
- Institutions: Moscow Aviation Institute
- Employer: RSC Energia
- Projects: Soviet space program
- Significant design: Sputnik program Vostok program

Arkady Ilyich Ostashev (Russian: Аркадий Ильич Осташев; 30 September 1925 – 12 July 1998) was a Soviet and Russian scientist, engineer – mechanic in the former Soviet space program, working on as a designer many of rocket propulsion and control system of Soviet satellites. He was a participant in the launch of the first artificial satellite of the Earth and the first cosmonaut, candidate of technical sciences, docent, laureate of the Lenin (1960) and State (1979) prizes, one of the leading managers of work in the field of experimental development of rocket technology OKB-1, personal pensioner of republican significance, student and interpersonal relationship of Sergei Korolev.

== Biography ==
He was born in the village of Maloye Vasilyevo. In his school years Arkady, together with his elder brother Yevgeny, under the leadership of the magazine "Knowledge is Power", designed and assembled a telescope with a 10-fold increase with the necessary bed and a mechanism of rotation in two planes, lenses for the eyepiece and the objective sent to the editorial Board of the journal free of charge. It observed the Moon , they dreamed of flying to the planets of the Solar System. Ostashev in 1942 graduated from 9 classes of middle school No. 32, Elektrougli, Noginsky District, Moscow region. After graduating from school, he studied for 2.5 months at preparatory courses at the Moscow Aviation Institute and passed exams according to the program of 10 classes, according to the results of which he was enrolled in the MAI named after S. Ordzhonikidze. In the fourth year of the institute, A.I. Ostashev managed to learn German documents on rocketry, obtained by a group of specialists sent by the country's leadership in Germany after World War II. After careful study of the materials received from German rocket scientists, A.I. Ostashev finally decided on the topic of his graduation project: "Composite rocket with a cruise last stage", with the stability of the main stage. But with such a topic of the graduation project, difficulties arose when choosing a consultant. Due to the novelty of the topic, they refused to consult:

- Dean facultyA No. 2 MAI doctor of technical sciences, professor, major general Myasishchev Vladimir Mikhailovich;
- Deputy chief LII doctor of technical sciences, professor Ostoslavsky Ivan Vasilyevich;
- Chief designer OKB-82 at factory No. 82 Pashinin Mikhail Mikhailovich.

On the advice of the assistant dean of the faculty Gaponenko M.P. Ostashev went to Podlipki to Sergei Pavlovich Korolev. So in 1947, A. I. Ostashev met S. P. Korolev. From 1947 until graduating from the Aviation Institute in 1948, Ostashev worked in Department No. 3 of the special design bureau of the Research Institute-88 of the Ministry of Defense Industry as a senior technician and under the guidance of Sergei Pavlovich Korolev prepared a diploma for defense. In this enterprise, A.I. Ostashev worked for more than 50 years in positions from a senior technician to the head of the complex. In 1952 he graduated from the VIC (higher engineering courses) in BMSTU, in the same year he graduated from the University of Marxism–Leninism in Mytishchi city Committee of the CPSU. In 1956 Arkady Ilyich joined the ranks of the CPSU. In 1975, A.I. Ostashev was the head of testing of the rocket-space systems according to the Russian–American program "ASTP" . All the scientific and engineering activities of Ostashev since 1948 connected with the development and introduction of the system of tests of missiles and rocket-space complexes. At the preliminary design of a famous "SEVEN" R-7, under the guidance of Ostashev created volume No. 14 fully dedicated to the testing of missiles. Arkady Ilyich author and co-author of over 200 scientific works , articles and inventions. In addition to engineering and scientific work, he was leading and teaching. Since 1961, he has been Docent (Department "Integrated system for measurement of aircraft") MAI them. S. Ordzhonikidze, lectured at Department No. 308.

Ostashev died on 12 July 1998, in Moscow. Personal will and testament Arkady Ilyich Ostashev was cremated for burial in the grave of the elder brother Yevgeny. In December 1998, after obtaining the relevant approvals and permits from the leadership of Kazakhstan dust Ostashev was moved by his wife and son to Baikonur (city) and buried in the grave of his older brother Yevgeny, who died on 24 October 1960 41 site the Baikonur cosmodrome in preparation for the launch of Intercontinental ballistic missile R-16.

== Family ==
- Wife – Ostasheva (before Vasilyev's marriage) Lyudmila Vasilyevna (1924–2003). Married since 1949.
  - Daughter – Ostasheva Olga Arkadyevna (born in 1951).
  - Son – Mikhail Arkadyevich Ostashev (born in 1956).

== Awards ==
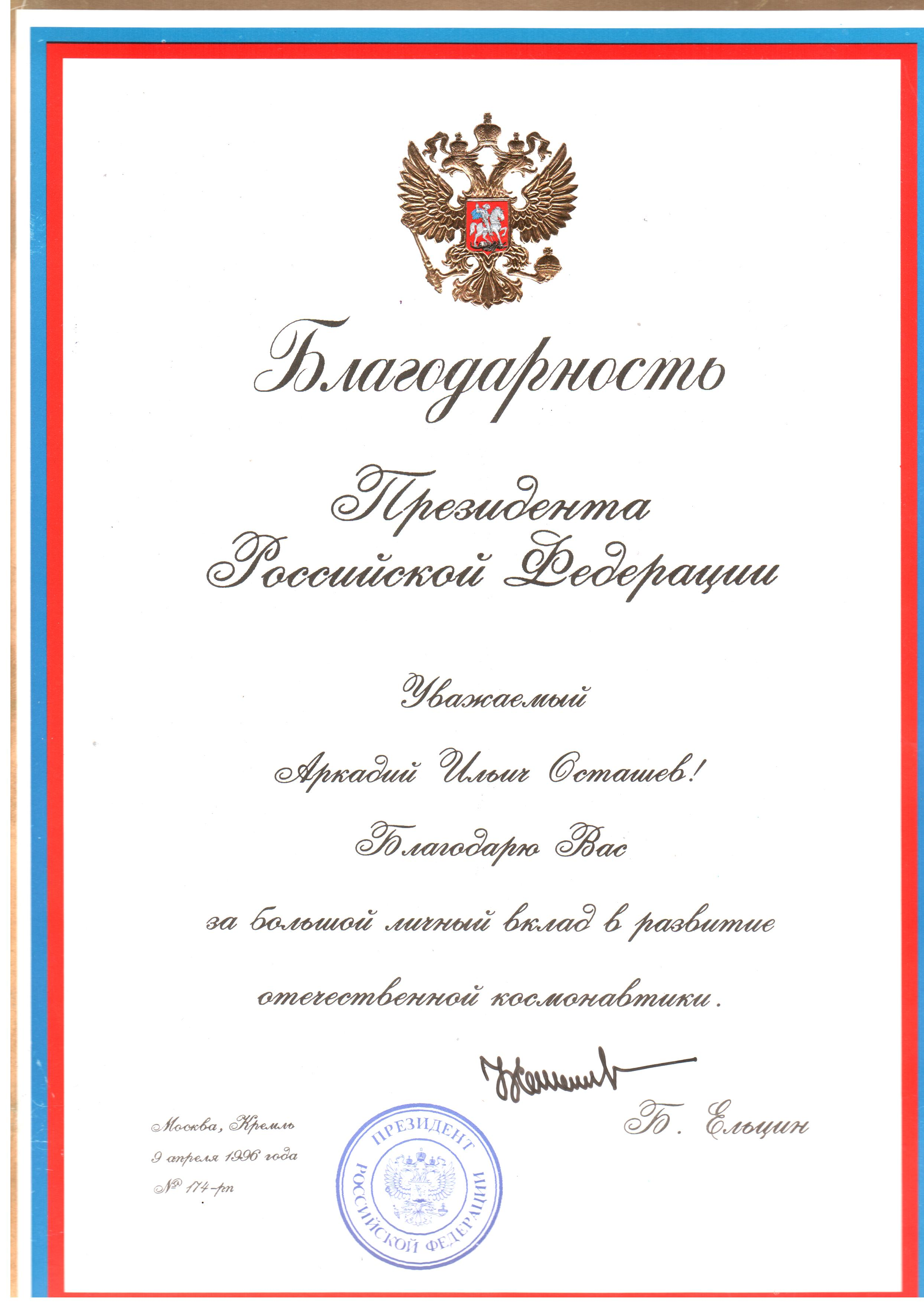
Gratitude of the President

- Order of the Red Banner of Labour (Decree of the Presidium of the Supreme Soviet of the Soviet Union (stamped "top secret") dated 20 April 1956) — For merits in the creation of long-range ballistic missiles and in connection with the 10th anniversary of OKB-1 – 1956
- Order of Lenin — for the creation and launch of the first artificial satellite of the Earth – Decree of the Presidium of the Supreme Soviet of the USSR No. 264/38 of 21 December 1957. Medal of the USSR Academy of Sciences for the first satellite.
- Lenin Prize — The decision of the Committee on Lenin Prizes in the Field of science and technology of 20 April 1960, "For the discovery and study of the outer radiation belt of the Earth and the study of the magnetic field of the Earth and the Moon."
- Order of Lenin — Decree of the Presidium of the Supreme Soviet of the USSR No. 253/34 17 June 1961, For the successful fulfillment of a special task of the Government to create samples of rocket technology, the Vostok satellite spacecraft and the implementation of the world's first flight of this ship with a man on board."
- Order of the Red Banner of Labour — Decree of the Presidium of the Supreme Soviet of the USSR dated 15 January 1976 "For participation in the implementation of a joint space flight under the Soyuz – Apollo program."
- The State Prize was awarded by the Resolution of the Central Committee of the CPSU and the Council of Ministers of the USSR dated 6 November 1979, "For work in the field of space research" (creation and implementation of the methodology for testing Progress cargo ships).
- Medal "For Valiant Labour in the Great Patriotic War 1941–1945"
- Medal "Veteran of Labour"
- Jubilee Medal "In Commemoration of the 100th Anniversary of the Birth of Vladimir Ilyich Lenin"
- other medals
- Gratitude President of the Russian Federation (9 April 1996 г.) — for a great personal contribution to the development of Russian cosmonautics
- A star (Arcadia) in the constellation Libra is named after A. I. Ostashev.

For the results achieved in his professional activity, Ostashev was awarded a personal pension of republican significance (characteristics for assigning a personal pension).

== Memory ==
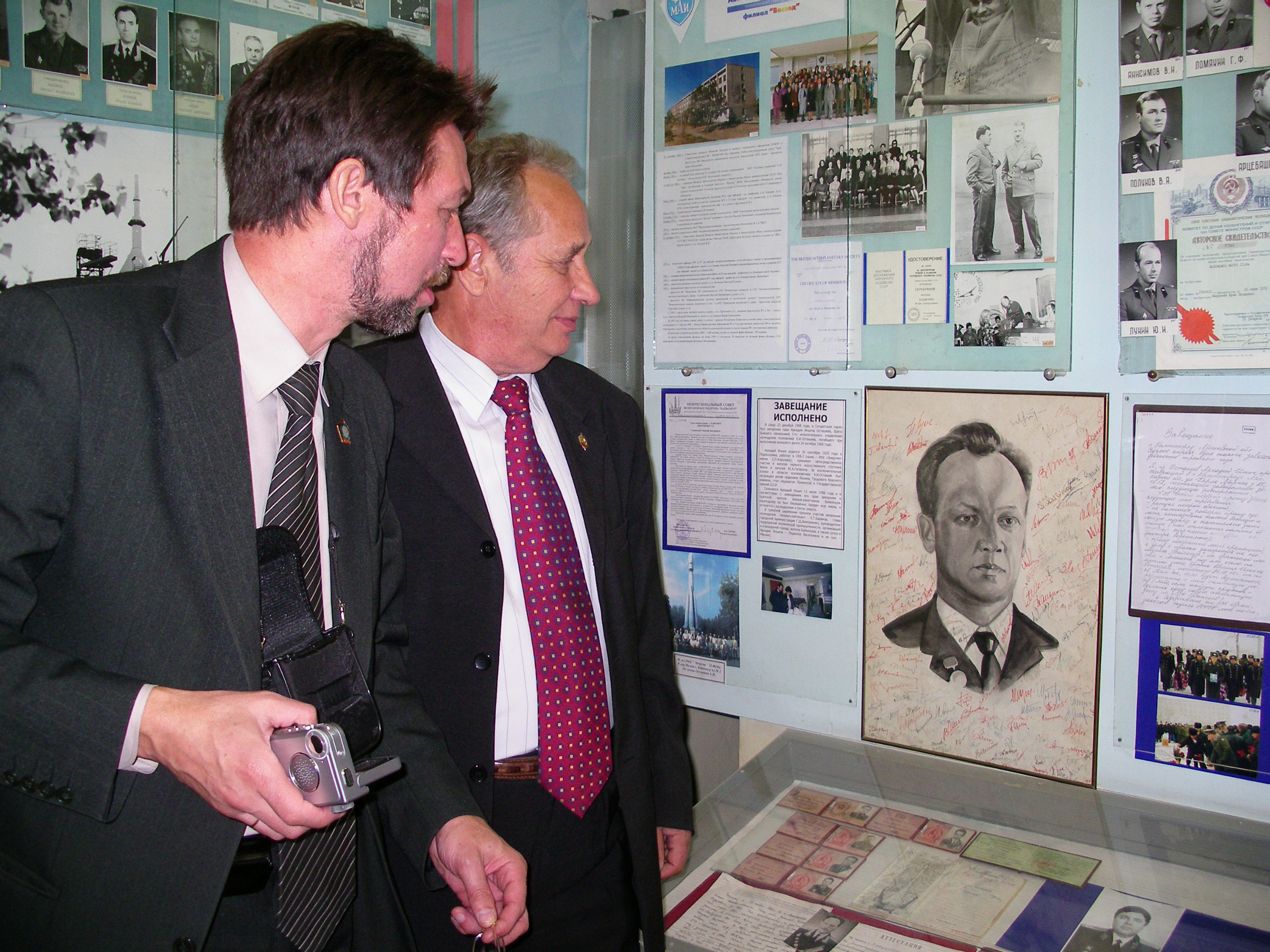
The Ostashev A.I. exposition at the museum of site No. 2 of the Baikonur cosmodrome

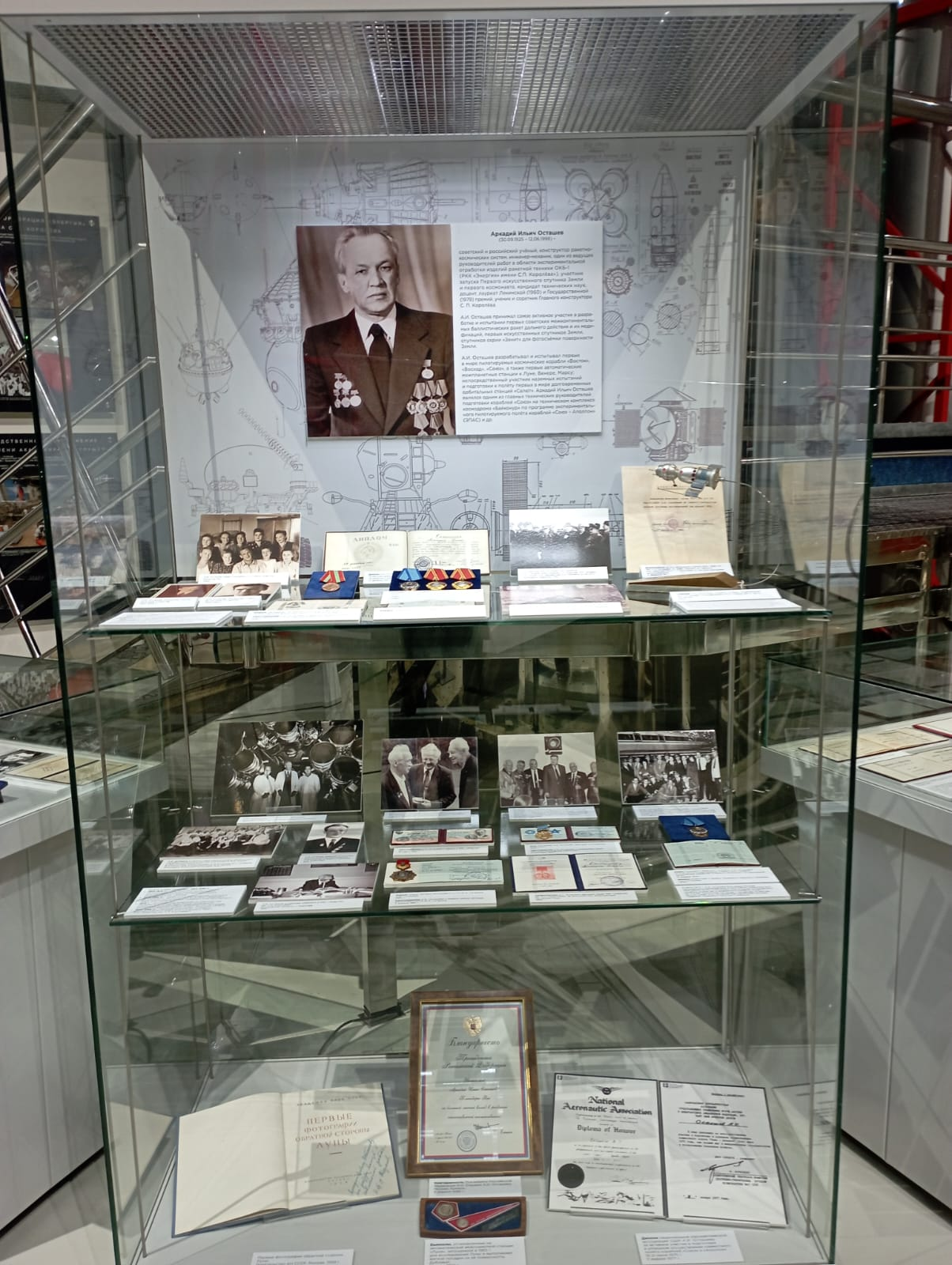
Exhibition dedicated to the 100th anniversary of A.I. Ostashev at the Museum of Cosmonautics in Moscow

In the museum at site No. 2 of the Baikonur cosmodrome organized an exposition dedicated to him. In Elektrougli, Noginsky District, Moscow region at the local history Museum has a booth dedicated to the Ostashev brothers. There is a memorial plaque at the house he grew up in. In Moscow, the Memorial Museum of Cosmonautics stores personal belongings, photographs and documents from the home archive of A. I. Ostashev. In the Museum of the RSC "Energia", where Ostashev worked for more than 50 years, there is material, dedicated to him (in the hall of "Labor Glory" the first showcase). In 1993 in the Russian state archive for scientific-technical documentation biographical documents, documents of creative, social and scientific activity of A. I. Ostashev are placed. A memorial plaque to Arkady Ilyich has been unveiled on the facade of the apartment building No. 17 on Tsiolkovsky Street in the city of Korolev. On September 30, 2025, Arkady Ostashev Life's Work exhibition dedicated to the 100th anniversary of his birth was opened at the Memorial Museum of Cosmonautics in Moscow.

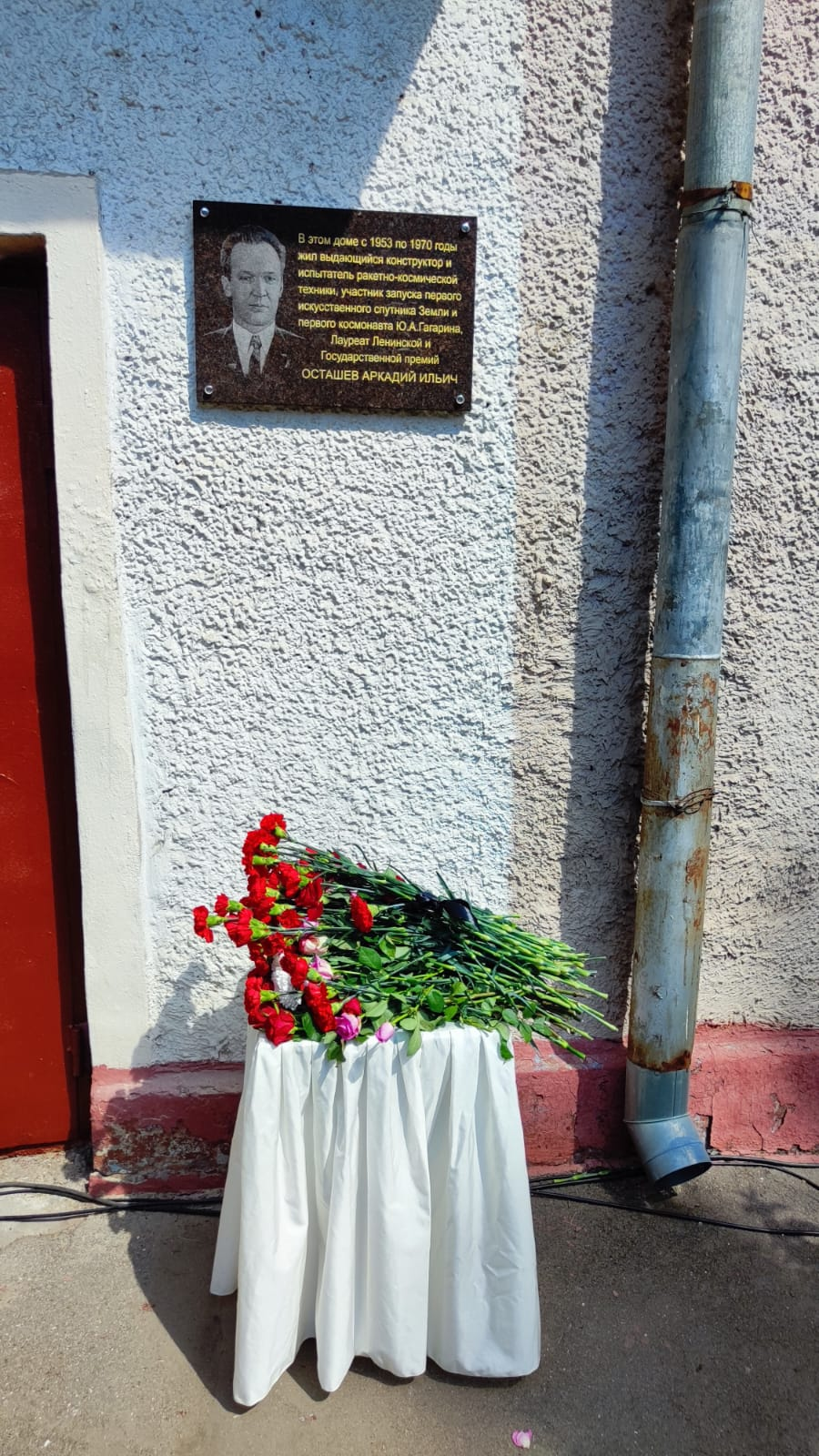
Memorial plaque to A.I. Ostashev on the facade of apartment building No. 17 on Tsiolkovsky Street in the city of Korolev, Moscow region

== Publications ==
Ostashev has publications in books, («the academician S. P. Korolyov scientist, engineer, man», «the Beginning of the space era», «an Unforgettable Baikonur», «Soyuz-Apollo» and others), magazines (The magazine "Russian space No. 10 2015, "Our Heritage" 97/2011, Science and life No. 1 1997 and others) and the papers on the following topics: test RKT, the history of the development of cosmonautics history of development SKB-3, OKB-1, TsKBEM, NPO "Energy" and RSC "Energia". In the early 1990s Arkady Ilyich was a frequent guest at the Memorial house-Museum of academician Korolev. He came to "tell" his memories on a tape recorder. From the memoirs of the Director of the Memorial house-Museum of academician Korolev L. A. Filinoy:

...Arkady Ilyich leads the whole Deposit of episodes from the life of S. P. Korolev, Moscow and Baikonur, but in the stories he never emphasizes its role, sometimes leading, as if he was there and only. This ability to look from the side, being in the center of events, the wilful detachment allows to him, like the custodian of the great MYSTERIES of TIME, keep it to once share the secret, tell you first hand... And more. Over the years, you realize that the most difficult thing in life, oddly enough, is the ability to be grateful to people, without the statute of limitations of the good done to you. This quality was given to S. P. Korolev. So the book Sergey Pavlovich Korolev: The Genius of the 20th Century was written not only by the best student of the Korolev School, the most talented test pilot of rocket technology of the 20th century, but also by a very honest person who remained forever grateful and devoted to the Chief Designer.

In 1997, the American writer J. Harford published the book «Korolev» , (John Wiley & Sons, Inc., New York City, 1997.) materials for which the author collected a few years. J.. Harford met with Ostashev and interviews were used in the book, but with some mistakes. Having received from the author instance and translating it into Russian, A.I. Ostashev wrote a letter of protest to the author. After the death of Ostashev in 2001 and 2005 there were published two editions of his book «the Test of rocket and space technology business of my life. Events and facts». In 2010 published the book "Sergei Pavlovich Korolev is the Genius of the twentieth century" lifetime personal memoirs about academician S. P. Korolev (M. GOU VPO MSFU ISBN 978-5-8135-0510-2), materials for which Ostashev collected from the moment of the enterprise, headed by S. P. Korolev, and until 1998. Gennady Artamonov, one of Ostashev's colleagues, wrote the following poem about him:

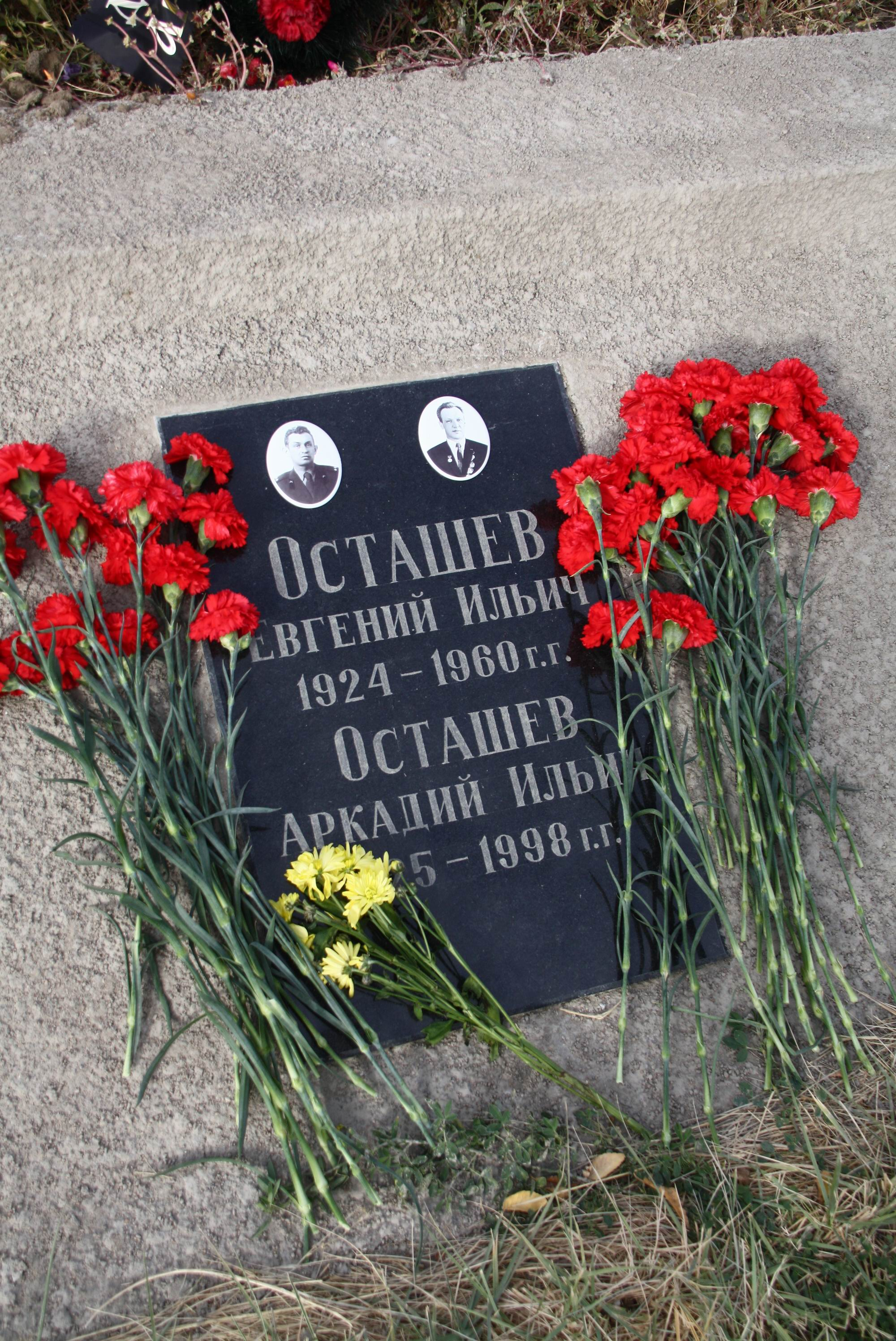
Baikonur, soldier's Park, tombstone of the grave of the Ostashev brothers

Rocket fire tried to get away,
But could not, and she froze...
In granite black
Memory we still have to go
In the Park of silence, the silence of the plates.
October the Baikonur not forgotten.
And now here without unnecessary big words
"Come" and lay down Arkady Ostashev.
He came to his brother, to relax,
Maybe with him to pass the eternal path.
Burning steppes, and melt concrete...
October he will not forget the polygon.

== Bibliography ==
- "Testing of rocket and space technology – the business of my life" Events and facts – A.I. Ostashev, Korolyov, 2001.
- A.I. Ostashev, Sergey Pavlovich Korolyov – The Genius of the 20th Century — 2010 M. of Public Educational Institution of Higher Professional Training MGUL ISBN 978-5-8135-0510-2.
