= Avdotyino, Noginsky District, Moscow Oblast =

Avdotyino Авдотьино
- Village
- Location within Moscow Oblast Location within Russia
- Coordinates: 55°55′N 38°14′E
- Country: Russia
- Region: Moscow Oblast
- District: Noginsky District
- Time zone: UTC+3:00

Avdotyino (Russian: Авдо́тьино) is a rural locality (a village) in the Yamkinskoye Rural Settlement of Noginsky District, Moscow Oblast, Russia. The population was 820 as of 2010. There are 14 streets.

== Geography ==
Avdotyino is located 22 km northwest of Noginsk (the district's administrative centre) by road. Pyatkovo is the nearest rural locality.
