= Elektrougli =

Town in Moscow Oblast, Russia

Elektrougli Электроугли
- Town
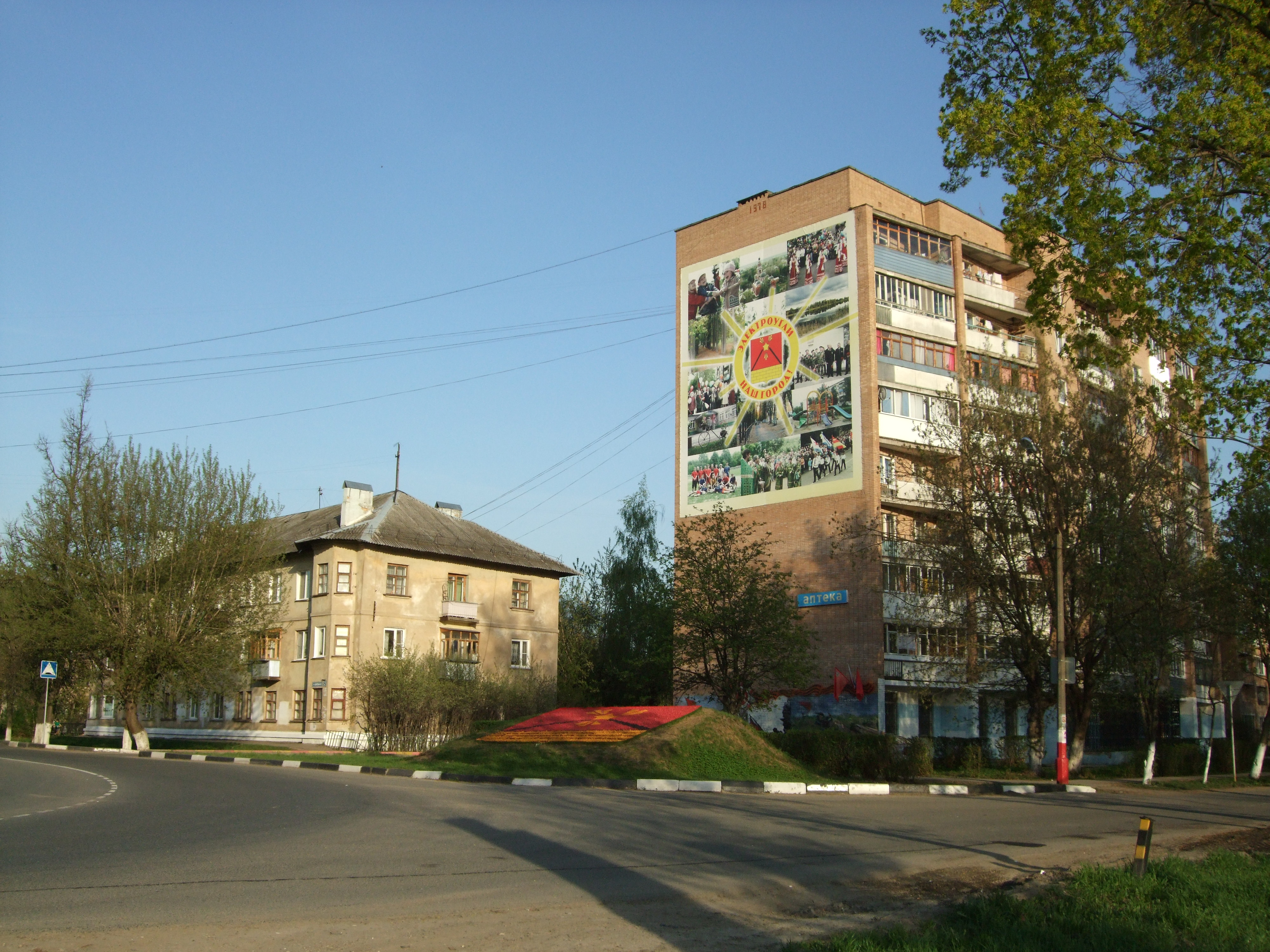
- In Elektrougli

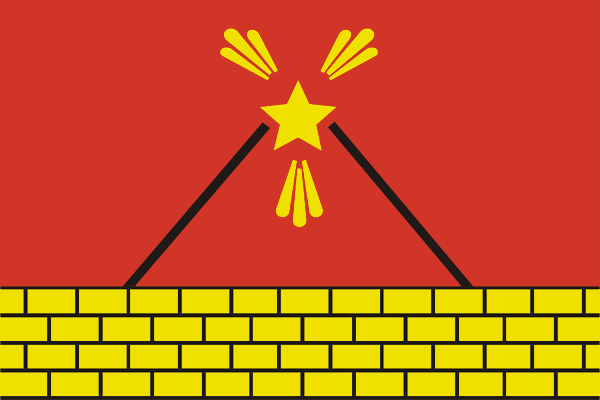
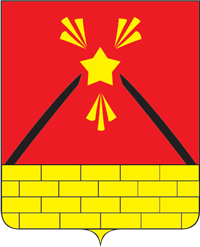
- Flag Coat of arms
- Interactive map of Elektrougli
- Location of Elektrougli Elektrougli (Moscow Oblast)
- Coordinates: 55°43′N 38°12′E
- Country: Russia
- Federal subject: Moscow Oblast
- Administrative district: Noginsky District
- TownSelsoviet: Elektrougli
- Founded: 1899
- Town status since: 1956
- Elevation: 140 m (460 ft)

Population (2010 Census)
  - Total: 20,136
  - Estimate (2025): 18,060 (−10.3%)

Administrative status
  - Capital of: Town of Elektrougli

Municipal status
  - Municipal district: Noginsky Municipal District
  - Urban settlement: Elektrougli Urban Settlement
  - Capital of: Elektrougli Urban Settlement
- Time zone: UTC+3 (MSK)
- Postal code: 142455
- OKTMO ID: 46751000011
- Website: www.elugli.ru

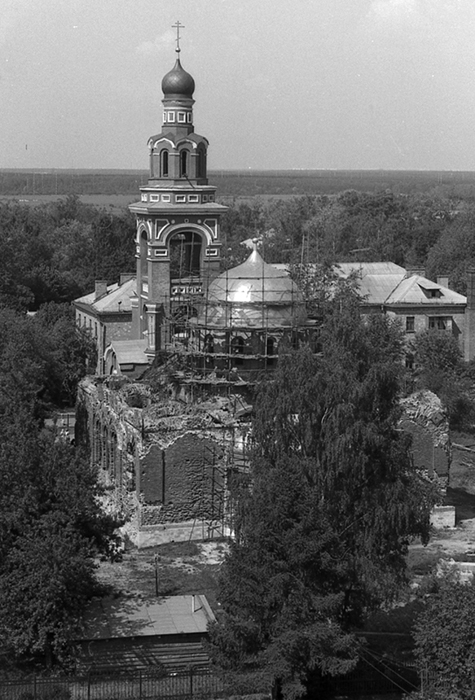
Holy Trinity Temple in Elektrougli in 1994

Elektrougli (Russian: Электроу́гли) is a town in Noginsky District of Moscow Oblast, Russia, located on the Moscow–Nizhny Novgorod railway, 36 kilometers (22 mi) east of Moscow and 18 kilometers (11 mi) southeast of Noginsk, the administrative center of the district. Population: 17,944 (2021 census); 20,136 (2010 census); 16,717 (2002 census); 18,645 (1989 Soviet census).

== Name ==
In 1899 was established "Elektrougli" (electric coals) factory.

== History ==
Urban-type settlement status was granted to it in 1935. Town status was granted in 1956.

== Administrative and municipal status ==
Within the framework of administrative divisions, it is, together with six rural localities, incorporated within Noginsky District as the Town of Elektrougli. As a municipal division, the Town of Elektrougli is incorporated within Noginsky Municipal District as Elektrougli Urban Settlement.

== "Svetliy Gorod" and "Papillon" development projects ==
The 11th Radio Center of the Government Service For Time and Frequency used to be located next to the Svetliy (russian: Светлый, literally: "bright") block of the town. It was headed by the Main Meteorological Center, one of the Russian Institute of Physic-Technical and Radio-Technical Measurements' subdivisions, founded in 1955. Since 1965, three transmitters in Moscow, Novosibirsk and Irkutsk switched to a round-the-clock precise time and reference frequency transmission mode. In 2005, Moscow Regional Centre and Russian Institute of Physic-Technical and Radio-Technical Measurements specialists transferred three radio stations to another 3rd Radiocenter (located in Taldom, Severniy settlement). This transformation was carried out in 2006-2007.

In 2007, the construction of an expansion to the Svetliy block was projected, supposed to have taken place on the territories of the abandoned, unused radiocenter and its surroundings. The buildings in the new neighborhood would have varying floor count buildings, complete with the necessary infrastructure. On top of that, a cottage block, named "Papillon", was projected. The development project was put together by Sergei Tsitsin's architecture workshop, part of the "MonArch" concern, founded in 2003 by Sergei Ambartsumian, one of Vladimir Resin's, the head of the capital's building complex, deputees.

Another project to build a toll highway from Moscow to Orekhovo-Zuevo through Noginsk supported the attractiveness of the future neighborhood. Initially, the living area attained by constructing the neighborhood was to be transferred to Moscow's ownership, to later be divided among those queued up in social programs. But in 2009, Moscow announced having withdrawn from the project.

In the beginning of 2008, economist Yuriy Razovskiy expressed his concerns about the prospects of such an ambitious project, costing an estimated $1 billion. He highlighted the lack of modern sewage treatment, clean potable water, and adequate social and transport infrastructure in Elektrougli, as well as the absence of modern hospitals and maternity wards. According to him, it was all a matter of insufficient competence, when it all boiled down to a marketing campaign featuring nothing but billboards along the Nosovikninskoe highway.

By 2012, of all that was projected, only the foundation pit for one of the buildings of the first construction queue was dug. Busov, the head of Elektrougli, wrote everything off to the incompetence of the ex-head-contractor. From 2010 to 2012, a set of claims to the company behind the project were considered by Moscow's arbitration court. This led to 17 million rubles being transferred from the construction company to the architecture workshop.
