= Baikonur Cosmodrome Site 41 =

Former complex of launch pads at Baikonur Cosmodrome in Kazakhstan

Coordinates: 45.97542°N 63.65982°E

Site 41
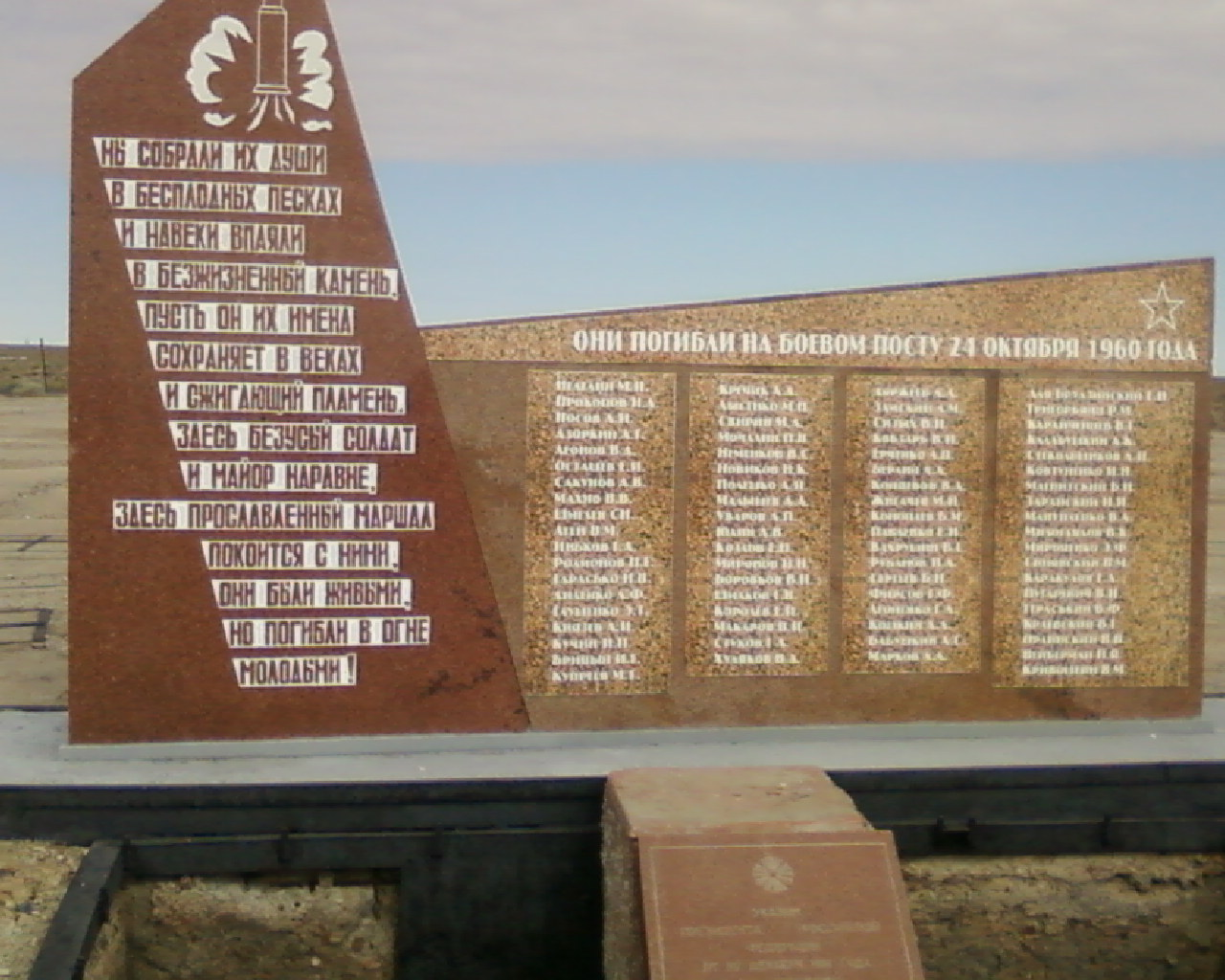
- The memorial to the fallen of 41 test pad of the Baikonur cosmodrome
- Interactive map of Site 41
- Launch site: Baikonur Cosmodrome
- Operator: RVSN
- Total launches: 134
- Launch pad: 3
Site 41/3 launch history
- Status: Demolished
- Launches: 31
- First launch: October 24, 1960
- Last launch: December 12, 1967
- Associated rockets: R-16
Site 41/4 launch history
- Status: Demolished
- Launches: 81
- First launch: February 2, 1961
- Last launch: December 27, 1967
- Associated rockets: R-16
Site 41/15 launch history
- Status: Demolished
- Launches: 22
- First launch: May 25, 1963; R-16U
- Last launch: August 27, 1968; Kosmos 3 / Kosmos 236
- Associated rockets: R-16; Kosmos 3

Site 41 was a complex of three launch pads at the Baikonur Cosmodrome originally built for flight testing of Intercontinental ballistic missile (ICBMs) using storable propellant. The need to develop such missiles was determined by low-tactical-technical and operational characteristics of the first Soviet ICBM R-7 created by the OKB-1 under the guidance of Sergei Pavlovich Korolev. May 13, 1959 by a special decree of the Central Committee of the CPSU and the CM of the design Bureau «Yuzhnoye» (Chief designer-Mikhail K. Yangel) assigned to develop an Intercontinental ballistic missile on storable components of propellant, which has received designation R-16 and index – 8К64 . Together with 41 platform built platform No. 42 – technical and No. 43 – for residing of serving military personnel and representatives of the industry.

== Construction of the site ==
In the second half of 1959, construction work began on the construction of the forties sites . Construction of pad for IBR R-16, consisting of the two launches, was entrusted E. I. Nikolaev. Thousands of employees of military engineers and civil subcontracting organizations, UPR Durova D. day and night worked with wholeheartedly. On the home page and technical exchanges were first ready-made premises and facilities. They began to mount the equipment. In April 1960 began construction of roads. In the month of may there were opportunities to resettle some of the soldiers in the capital, stone barracks, were ready hostel for officers-builders and customers. The supervision of construction and landfill everything was done to make life easier for a large mass of people. In August the construction work on the sites 41, 42, 43 were completed. And by 17 October 1960 and equipment erection works on objects of sites No. 41, 42 and 43 were finished.

== Operation of the site ==
26 September 1960 at the Baikonur cosmodrome came the first flight of the rocket product 8К64 No. LSD1-ST. In September 1960, was approved by the state Commission for the flight tests of ICBMs R-16. The Chairman of the commission was appointed Deputy Minister of defence Commander-in-chief of the strategic missile forces Chief Marshal of artillery and rocket forces M. I. Nedelin, the technical leader tests – Chief designer of OKB-586 -Mikhail K. Yangel. Until October 20, were carried out complex tests of all systems of the rocket in the Assembly-test complex, and on the morning of 21 October 1960 rocket was rolled out from Assembly and testing facility and delivered to the 41-St platform. 21 and 22 October been held under the prelaunch preparation of the docking head, lifting and installation of the rocket on the launch pad, communication connection and testing of all systems. 23 October missile was filled with the propellant components and compressed gases. By decision of state Commission rocket launch was appointed by 19:00 on October 23. But the identified faults forced Госкомиммию postpone the start of a rocket on October 24. First half of the day on October 24, would eliminate the defects. Around 18:45, was declared a 30-minute readiness for launch and started exhibiting in zero software токораспределителя. Occurred unauthorized starting of the engine of the second stage. Fiery stream destroyed the tanks of the oxidant and fuel in the first stage. An avalanche burning lasted about 20 seconds, after which the remains of the units and buildings were burnt down in two hours. Due to the accident site No. 41 was completely destroyed, killed 78 people and 42 people injured [3]. In October 1998 at the initiative of the commander in/h 44275 of Tomczuk V. R., the officers of the 1st center Baikonur cosmodrome on the 41st floor was installed monument to the testers .

== Literature ==
- "Rockets and people" – B. E. Chertok, M: "mechanical engineering", 1999. ISBN 5-217-02942-0 (in Russian);
- «At risk», – A. A. Toul, Kaluga, "the Golden path", 2001. ISBN 5-7111-0333-1
- «A breakthrough in space», – Konstantin Vasilyevich Gerchik, M: LLC "Veles", 1994. ISBN 5-87955-001-X
- Harford, James. Korolev – How One Man Masterminded the Soviet Drive to Beat America to the Moon. John Wiley & Sons, Inc., New York, 1997. pp 119–120. ISBN 0-471-14853-9
- "Testing of rocket and space technology – the business of my life" Events and facts – A.I. Ostashev, Korolyov, 2001.;
- "Baikonur. Korolev. Yangel." – M. I. Kuznetsk, Voronezh: IPF "Voronezh", 1997, ISBN 5-89981-117-X
- "Look back and look ahead. Notes of a military engineer" – Rjazhsky A. A., 2004, SC. first, the publishing house of the "Heroes of the Fatherland" ISBN 5-91017-018-X.
- "Unknown Baikonur" – edited by B. I. Posysaeva, M.: "globe", 2001. ISBN 5-8155-0051-8
- "Rocket and space feat Baikonur" – Vladimir Порошков, the "Patriot" publishers 2007. ISBN 5-7030-0969-3
- "Bank of the Universe" – edited by Boltenko A. C., Kyiv, 2014., publishing house "Phoenix", ISBN 978-966-136-169-9
- "We grew hearts in Baikonur" – Author: Eliseev V. I. M: publisher OAO MPK in 2018, ISBN 978-5-8493-0415-1
