= R-14 Chusovaya =

R-14
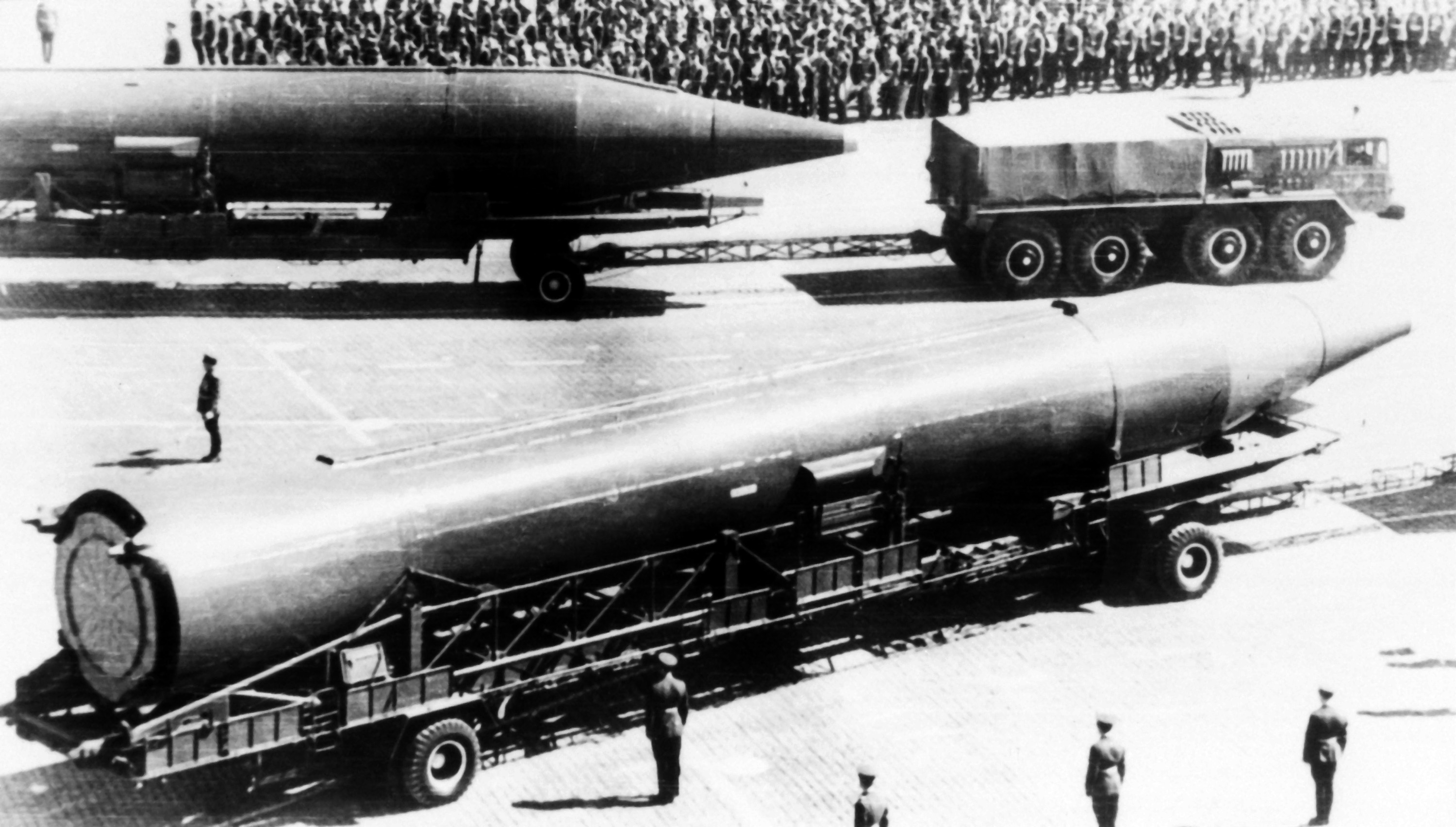
- A right side view of two vehicle-mounted Soviet R-14 missiles (SS-5 Skean) IRBMs (1977).
- Type: Intermediate-range ballistic missile
- Place of origin: USSR

Service history
- In service: 1962-1984
- Used by: Strategic Rocket Forces
- Wars: Cold War

Production history
- Designer: OKB-586
- Designed: 1958-1960
- Manufacturer: PO Polyot
- Unit cost: unknown
- Produced: 24 April 1961
- No. built: 8000
- Variants: R-14U, Cosmos 1-3

Specifications
- Mass: 86.3 t
- Length: 24,400 mm
- Diameter: 2,400 mm
- Wingspan: 2.74 m
- Warhead: Thermonuclear weapon
- Warhead weight: 1200-1500 kg
- Detonation mechanism: Airburst / Bunker buster
- Blast yield: 1 Mt (lightweight warhead); 2-2.3 Mt (heavy warhead)
- Engine: RD-216; 1,480 kN
- Propellant: Hydrazine/Nitrogen tetroxide
- Operational range: 3,700 km (2,300 mi) (American calculation); 4,500 km (2,800 mi) (Soviet calculation)
- Flight ceiling: 500 km
- Guidance system: inertial guidance
- Accuracy: 1.13–2.4 km (0.70–1.49 mi) CEP
- Launch platform: Silo, pad, submarines or mobile launcher

The R-14 Chusovaya (Russian: Р-14 Чусовая, named for the Chusovaya river) was a single stage Intermediate-range ballistic missile developed by the Soviet Union during the Cold War. It was given the NATO reporting name SS-5 Skean and was known by GRAU index 8K65. It was designed by Mikhail Yangel. Chusovaya is the name of a river in Russia. Line production was undertaken by Facility No. 1001 in Krasnoyarsk.

== Overview ==
Development of the R-14 began by directive on 2 July 1958 at OKB-586 in Dnipropetrovsk (Dnipro, Ukraine). The preliminary design was completed in December 1958, with flight tests beginning in June 1960 and completed in February 1961. The missile was accepted into service on 24 April 1961; initial operational capability for the first division of four launchers was achieved on 31 December 1961, with the first regiment organized the next day. By the end of 1962 two regiments were fully operational in Ukraine and Latvia, with later surface launch pad sites in Kaliningrad and Belarus. A regiment consisted of two divisions, with eight launchers total; by the 1970s one mobile regiment consisted of 3 control units and 4-5 launchers. Upon introduction, the primary targets of R-14s were Thor missile sites in Britain, Jupiter missile sites in Italy and Turkey, and the Polaris missile submarine base at Rota, Spain. Production of the missile was initially done at Factory 586 in Dnepropetrovsk and Factory 1001 in Krasnoyarsk, with the RD-216 engine built only at Factory 586. From 1962 onward, production was shifted exclusively to Aviation Factory 166 in Omsk.

Prior to the onset of the 1962 Cuban Missile Crisis, the Soviet Union planned to deploy two regiments with 32 R-14 IRBMs and 16 launchers to Cuba. By the time the United States declared a quarantine of the island, 24 one-megaton warheads had arrived but no missiles or launchers had yet been shipped. The warheads were removed and the deployment of the R-14 to Cuba was cancelled after the crisis was resolved.

In May 1960, development of the R-14U (universal) version, which could be launched from both surface pads or 'Chusovaya' complex missile silos, was authorized and test launches began in January 1962. In the silo-launched version, each regiment consisted of two divisions, each division being a single emplacement with a hardened command and control technical point and three silos. The silos were placed at least 100 m from the other about the technical point. Each silo was 30 m deep and hardened to withstand overpressures of 2 kg/cm^{2} (28 psi). The silo design was accepted for service in June 1963, and the first R-14U silo division became operational at Priekule, Latvia in 1964. Complexes were also built in the Russian Far East, Kazakhstan, Ukraine.

Deployment of the R-14 and R-14U reached its peak from 1964-1969 with 97 launchers. Reaction time in the normal readiness condition is 1-3 hours for soft sites and 5-15 minutes for hard sites. Readiness states for reaction times of 3-5 minutes could be held for several hours at soft sites and several days at hard sites. Phasing out of hard sites began in 1971 and R-14Us (in mixed deployment with mobile launchers) was retired in the late 1970s. Some soft site phase-outs began in 1969, and the missile was gradually replaced by the RSD-10 Pioneer between 1978 and 1983, being completely withdrawn from service in 1984. Following the signing of the Intermediate-Range Nuclear Forces Treaty, the remaining six R-14 missiles in storage were scrapped on 9 August 1989.

== Derivatives ==
The missile was the basis of the Kosmos-3 launch vehicle family. In 1964, the R-14 was equipped with a smaller second stage to create the Kosmos-1 (65S3) booster and eight were flown over the next year from LC-41 at Baikonur. By 1966, the fully operational Kosmos-3 (11K65) booster was in use, but it was flown only four times before being succeeded by the definitive Kosmos-3M (11K65M) launcher, used for assorted light civilian and military satellites, most being launched from Plesetsk Cosmodrome (only some of them were flown from Kapustin Yar). This launch vehicle was used for over 420 successful launches until retired from service in 2010.

== Operators ==
Soviet Union

- Strategic Rocket Forces − Scrapped

== See also ==
- List of missiles
- R-12 Dvina
- DF-26
- Agni-IV
