= Russian State Archive of Scientific-Technical Documentation =

Government agency (1995-)

Russian state archive for scientific-technical documentation (RGANTD)
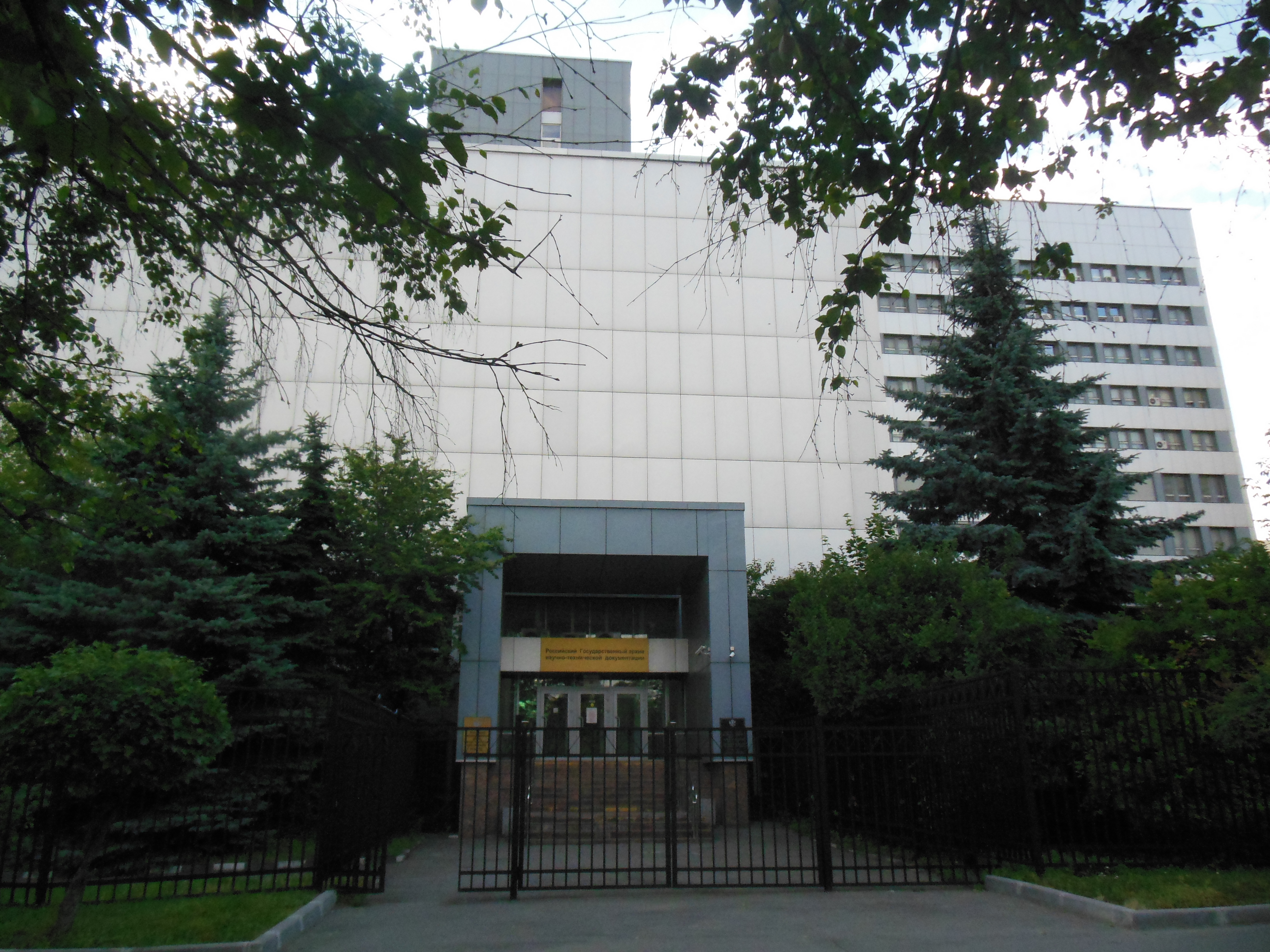
- Profsoyuznaya Street, 82v

Agency overview
- Formed: 1995
- Jurisdiction: Government of Russia
- Agency executive: Malyutina, Marina Andreevna., Director
- Parent agency: The Ministry of public order protection (Federal Archival Agency)
- Website: http://rgantd.ru/

Russian state archive for scientific-technical documentation (RGANTD) created by Decree of the Government of the Russian Federation No. 575 from 9 June 1995, on the basis of the Russian research center for space documentation (RNITSKD) in Moscow and the Russian state scientific and technical archives (RGNF) in Samara.

== History of creation ==
13 January 1960 by the decree of the Presidium of the USSR Supreme Soviet abolished the Ministry of Internal Affairs of the USSR is created by the Ministry of public order. In this regard, HAU (Main Archival Administration) of the interior is transformed into GOW under the Council of Ministers of the USSR.

28 July 1961 the Council of Ministers Resolution No. 669 approved “Regulations on the state University of management under the Council of Ministers of the USSR and the network of Central state archives of the USSR”.

In 1961 in Moscow created the Central state archive of the national economy of the USSR (ZHANG USSR).

On the basis of the Department of scientific-technical documentation ZHANG USSR Resolution no 431 of the USSR Council of Ministers in Moscow was created the Central state archive of scientific-technical documentation of the USSR (RGANTD USSR).

The Central State Archive of Scientific and Technical Documentation of the USSR (Центральный государственный архив научно-технической документации СССР; ЦГАНТД СССР) was established by Resolution No. 431 of the Council of Ministers of the Soviet Union, dated May 21, 1964, titled "On the Centralization of the Storage of Scientific and Technical Documentation and the Organization of Its Widespread Use." This resolution instructed the Council of Ministers of the RSFSR to ensure the construction of a building complex for the TsGANTD SSSR in the city of Kuybyshev between 1965 and 1967. During the construction period, the archive's operations were based in Moscow.

In 1992 TSGANTD the USSR by the RF Government Decree No. 430 renamed the Russian state scientific and technical archives in (RGNTA) with a branch office in Moscow in 1992, renamed in Russian scientific research center for space documentation (RNITSKD).

The Central Archive of Scientific and Technical Documentation of Moscow (Центральный архив научно-технической документации Москвы; ЦАНТДМ) was established in May 1993.

RNITSKD formed their Fund documents of organizations-participants of space activities, documents of space subjects of media organizations, personal archives of specialists on rockets, astronauts, memories of the workers of science and technology.

== Information about documents ==
The basic directions of activity of the archive are:

1. Acquisition of the archive documents of organizations of the defense complex and the civilian branches of the economy; documents, personal archives of workers of science and technology, and documents created by specialists of the archive in the order of the initiative documenting the memories of veterans of space industry, events and facts, reflecting the development of cosmonautics Russia.
2. State registration and storage of documents.
3. Creation and management of the scientific-reference apparatus to the archive documents and implementation of the automated archival technologies.
4. Scientific use and publication of documents of the archive.
5. Ensuring physical-chemical safety of documents of the archive.
6. Microfilming and restoring documents of Federal archives located, in Moscow.

By the end of 2012 in archives RGANTD (G. Moscow) is more than 580 thousand units of storage of documents, reflecting the activities of more than 500 organizations included in the aerospace, defense and scientific-technical complex of the country, and private persons.
