= Boris Chertok =

Soviet-Russian scientist and engineer (1912–2011)

- Борис Черток
- B. Y. Chertok (1912-2011)
- Born: 1 March 1912; Łódź, Russian Empire (Present day in Poland)
- Died: 14 December 2011 (aged 99); Moscow, Russia
- Citizenship: Russia
- Engineering career
- Discipline: Engineering (Controls)
- Institutions: Soviet space program
- Employer(s): Energia; Roscosmos; Russian Space Forces
- Awards: See awards and honors

Boris Yevseyevich Chertok (Russian: Бори́с Евсе́евич Черто́к; 14 March [O.S. 1 March] 1912 – 14 December 2011) was a Russian engineer in the former Soviet space program, mainly working in control systems, and later found employment in Roscosmos.

His main responsibilities included computerized control systems for Soviet missiles and rockets. He also authored the four-volume book Rockets and People, a major source of information about the history of the Soviet space program.

From 1974, he was the deputy chief designer of the Korolev design bureau, the space aircraft designer bureau which he started working for in 1946. He retired in 1992.

== Personal life ==
Born in Łódź (modern Poland), his family moved to Moscow when he was aged 3. Starting from 1930, he worked as an electrician in a metropolitan suburb. Since 1934, he was already designing military aircraft in Bolkhovitinov design bureau. In 1946, he entered the rocket-pioneering NII-88 as a head of control systems department, working along with Sergei Korolev, whose deputy he became after OKB-1 spun off from the NII-88 in 1956.

He was married to Yekaterina Semyonovna Golubkina. He was an atheist.

== Rockets and People ==
Between 1994 and 1999 Boris Chertok, with support from his wife Yekaterina Golubkina, created the four-volume book series about the history of the Soviet space industry. The series was originally published in Russian, in 1999.

- Черток Б.Е. Ракеты и люди — М.: Машиностроение, 1999. (B. Chertok, Rockets and People) (in Russian)
- Черток Б.Е. Ракеты и люди. Фили — Подлипки — Тюратам — М.: Машиностроение, 1999. (B. Chertok, Rockets and People. Fili — Podlipki — Tyuratam) (in Russian)
- Черток Б.Е. Ракеты и люди. Горячие дни холодной войны — М.: Машиностроение, 1999. (B. Chertok, Rockets and People. Hot Days of the Cold War) (in Russian)
- Черток Б.Е. Ракеты и люди. Лунная гонка — М.: Машиностроение, 1999. (B. Chertok, Rockets and People. The Moon Race) (in Russian)

=== Translation into English ===
NASA's History Division published four translated and somewhat edited volumes of the series between 2005 and 2011. The series editor was Asif Siddiqi, the author of Challenge to Apollo: The Soviet Union and the Space Race, 1945-1974. Chertok dedicated this series to his wife.

- Boris Chertok (author). Rockets and People, Volume 1, 2005. ISBN 0-16-073239-5. Published by NASA.
- Boris Chertok (author). Rockets and People, Volume 2: Creating a Rocket Industry, 2006. ISBN 0-16-076672-9. Published by NASA.
- Boris Chertok (author). Rockets and People, Volume 3: Hot Days of the Cold War, 2009. ISBN 978-0-16-081733-5. Published by NASA.
- Boris Chertok (author). Rockets and People, Volume 4: The Moon Race, 2011. ISBN 9780160895593 Published by NASA.

== Honours and awards ==
- Hero of Socialist Labour (1961)
- Order of Merit for the Fatherland, 4th class (1996)
- Two Orders of Lenin (1956, 1961)
- Order of the October Revolution (1971)
- Order of the Red Banner of Labour (1975)
- Order of the Red Star (1945)
- Medal "For Merit in Space Exploration" (12 April 2011) - for the great achievements in research, development and utilization of outer space, many years of diligent work, public activities
- Gold Medal BN Petrov Academy of Sciences (1992)
- Gold Medal named after SP Korolev, RAS (2008)
- Lenin Prize (1957) - for participation in creating the first artificial satellites
- USSR State Prize (1976) - for participation in the project "Soyuz-Apollo"
- International Prize of St Andrew "For Faith and Loyalty" (2010)
- Asteroid 6358 Chertok was named after him
- Corresponding Member of the USSR Academy of Sciences (1968) of the Department of Mechanics and Control Processes
- Member of the Russian Academy of Sciences (2000)
- Member of the International Academy of Astronautics (1990)
- Honorary Member of Russian Academy of Astronautics
- Member of the International Academy of Informatization
- Jubilee Medal "In Commemoration of the 100th Anniversary since the Birth of Vladimir Il'ich Lenin"
- Medal "For the Defence of Moscow"
- Medal "For the Victory over Germany in the Great Patriotic War 1941–1945"
- Jubilee Medal "Thirty Years of Victory in the Great Patriotic War 1941-1945"
- Jubilee Medal "Forty Years of Victory in the Great Patriotic War 1941-1945"
- Medal "For Valiant Labour in the Great Patriotic War 1941-1945"
- Jubilee Medal "60 Years of Victory in the Great Patriotic War 1941-1945"
- Medal "Veteran of Labour"
- Jubilee Medal "50 Years of the Armed Forces of the USSR"
- Jubilee Medal "60 Years of the Armed Forces of the USSR"
- Medal "In Commemoration of the 800th Anniversary of Moscow"
- Medal "In Commemoration of the 850th Anniversary of Moscow"
- Medal "In Commemoration of the 1500th Anniversary of Kiev"
- Jubilee Medal "300 Years of the Russian Navy"

== See also ==
- Institute Rabe

== Literature ==
- Vladimir Branets, Boris Evseyevich Chertok (to 95th birthday) (in Russian);
- "Testing of rocket and space technology - the business of my life" Events and facts - A.I. Ostashev, Korolyov, 2001.;
- A.I. Ostashev, Sergey Pavlovich Korolyov - The Genius of the 20th Century — 2010 M. of Public Educational Institution of Higher Professional Training MGUL ISBN 978-5-8135-0510-2;
- «A breakthrough in space» - Konstantin Vasilyevich Gerchik, M: LLC "Veles", 1994, - ISBN 5-87955-001-X;
- "Look back and look ahead. Notes of a military engineer" - Rjazhsky A. A., 2004, SC. first, the publishing house of the "Heroes of the Fatherland" ISBN 5-91017-018-X;
- "Rocket and space feat Baikonur" - Vladimir Порошков, the "Patriot" publishers 2007. ISBN 5-7030-0969-3;
- "Unknown Baikonur" - edited by B. I. Posysaeva, M.: "globe", 2001. ISBN 5-8155-0051-8;
- "People duty and honor" – A. A. Shmelev, the second book. M: Editorial Board "Moscow journal", 1998.
- "Bank of the Universe" - edited by Boltenko A. C., Kyiv, 2014., publishing house "Phoenix", ISBN 978-966-136-169-9
- "S. P. Korolev. Encyclopedia of life and creativity" - edited by C. A. Lopota, RSC Energia. S. P. Korolev, 2014 ISBN 978-5-906674-04-3
- "Space science city Korolev" - Author: Posamentir R. D. M: publisher SP Struchenevsky O. V., ISBN 978-5-905234-12-5
- "History in faces and destiniesv" – Author: Posamentir R. D. M: publisher SP Struchenevsky O. V., ISBN 978-5-905234-17-0
- "I look back and have no regrets. " - Author: Abramov, Anatoly Petrovich: publisher "New format" Barnaul, 2022. ISBN 978-5-00202-034-8
