= Noginsky District =

Noginsky District Ногинский район (Russian)
- District
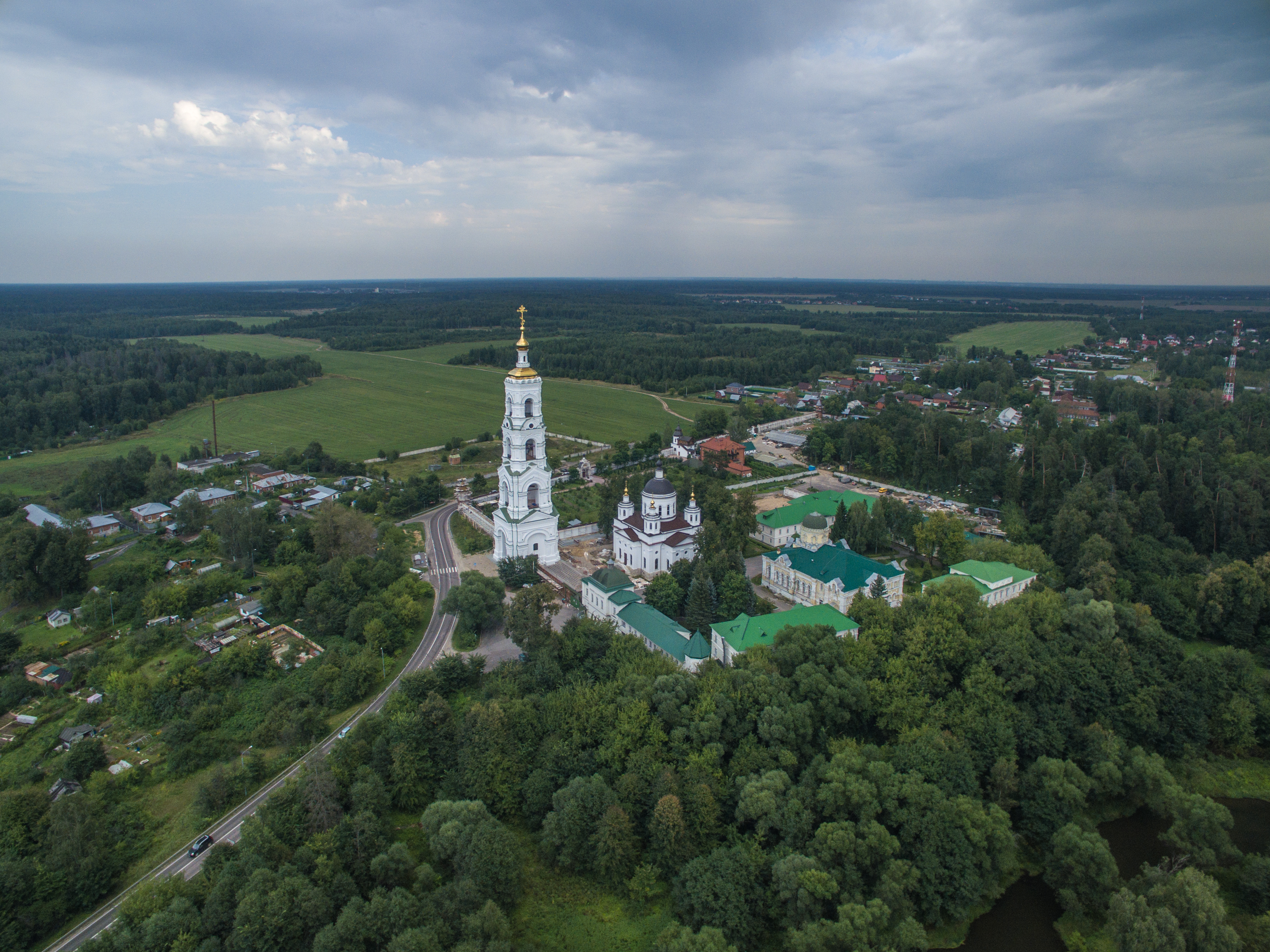
- Nikolo-Berlyukovskaya Monastery, a cultural heritage object in the village of Avdotyino in Noginsky District

- Flag Coat of arms
- Location of Noginsky District in Moscow Oblast
- Coordinates: 55°51′N 38°27′E
- Country: Russia
- Federal subject: Moscow Oblast
- Established: 5 June 2018
- Administrative center: Noginsk

Area
  - Total: 893.90 km^{2} (345.14 sq mi)

Population (2010 Census)
  - Total: 203,609
  - Density: 227.78/km^{2} (589.94/sq mi)
  - Urban: 77.0%
  - Rural: 23.0%

Administrative structure
  - Administrative divisions: 3 Towns, 2 Work settlements, 5 Rural settlements
  - Inhabited localities: 3 cities/towns, 2 urban-type settlements, 87 rural localities

Municipal structure
  - Municipally incorporated as: Noginsky Municipal District
  - Municipal divisions: 5 urban settlements, 5 rural settlements
- Time zone: UTC+3 (MSK)
- OKTMO ID: 46751
- Website: http://noginsk-raion.ru

Population of Noginsky District
- 2010 Census: 203,609
- 2002 Census: 232,674
- 1989 Census: 120,847
- 1979 Census: 113,819

Noginsky District (Russian: Ноги́нский райо́н) is an administrative and municipal district (raion), one of the thirty-six in Moscow Oblast, Russia. It is located in the east of the oblast. The area of the district is 893.90 square kilometers (345.14 sq mi). Its administrative center is the town of Noginsk. As of the 2010 Census, the total population of the district was 203,609, with the population of Noginsk accounting for 49.1% of that number.
