= R-16 (missile) =

Soviet intercontinental ballistic missile

Service history
- In service: 1961–1976
- Used by: Soviet Union

Production history
- Designer: Mikhail Yangel, Valentin Glushko
- Manufacturer: Plant 586, Glushko OKBM, Hartron OKB

Specifications
- Mass: Between 140.6 tonnes (154,98 tons) and 141.2 tonnes (155,65 tons), depending on warhead
- Length: Between 30,440 mm (99.86 ft) and 34,300 mm (112.53 ft), depending on warhead
- Diameter: 3,000 mm (9.84 ft)
- Blast yield: 3–6 Mt
- Engine: Two storable, liquid fueled stages; First Stage: 3x RD-218 + 1x RD-68; Second Stage: 1x RD-219 + 1x RD-69
- Propellant: AK27I + UDMH
- Operational range: 11,000–13,000 km
- Guidance system: inertial guidance
- Accuracy: 2.7 km

The R-16 was the first successful intercontinental ballistic missile deployed by the Soviet Union. In the West it was known by the NATO reporting name SS-7 Saddler, and within Russia, it carried the GRAU index 8K64.

== Description ==
The missile was 30.4 m long, 3 m in diameter and had a launch weight of 141 tons. The maximum range was 11,000 km with a 5–6 Mt thermonuclear warhead and 13,000 km with a 3 Mt warhead. The missile had a circular error probable (CEP) of 2.7 km.

== History ==
R-16

During development, a massive failure occurred on October 24, 1960, when a prototype rocket exploded on the pad killing an estimated 54–300 personnel. After decades of coverup, the government finally revealed this incident in 1989, referred to as the Nedelin catastrophe. A fatal accident with the R-9 missile occurred exactly three years later, causing October 24 to be referred to as Baikonur's "Black Day." No launches have been attempted on that date at Baikonur ever since.

After the delays associated with the deaths of many people working on the project, the first flight of the missile took place on 2 February 1961. Initial operational capability was achieved on 1 November 1961. The missile continued to serve until 1976, with maximum deployment numbers reached in 1965 with 202 missiles deployed. The Soviets had fewer than 50 of these missiles deployed in 1962 during the Cuban Missile Crisis. It is possible that only around 20 interim R-16 launchers were operational during the height of the crisis.

The R-16 was a true first-generation intercontinental missile and a vast improvement over the largely experimental 'zeroth' generation R-7 Semyorka. The missile used a hypergolic bipropellant combination of unsymmetrical dimethylhydrazine (UDMH) fuel in combination with red fuming nitric acid (RFNA) oxidiser. The Soviets initially deployed it at soft sites which were not shielded from nuclear attack. On normal duty the missiles were stored in hangars, and it took one to three hours to roll them out, fuel them, and reach launch readiness. The missiles could remain fueled for only a few days due to the corrosive nature of the nitric acid. After this, the fuel would have to be removed and the missile sent back to the factory for rebuilding. Even when fueled and in an alert posture, the Soviet missiles still needed to wait up to twenty minutes to spin up the gyroscopes in their guidance systems before launch was possible. Despite these shortcomings, the R-16 was unquestionably the first truly successful intercontinental ballistic missile developed by the Soviet Union.

The Soviets were aware of the missile's vulnerability, and from 1963 onward some R-16U missiles were based in silos, with around 69 silo launchers put into service. Each launch complex consisted of three silos clustered together for economic reasons to allow them to use a common refueling system, making them vulnerable to a single U.S. missile.

The control system of this rocket was designed at OKB-692 (Kharkov, Ukrainian SSR).

== Operator ==
Soviet Union
The Strategic Rocket Forces were the only operator of the R-16.

== See also ==
- List of missiles
