= Soviet rocketry =

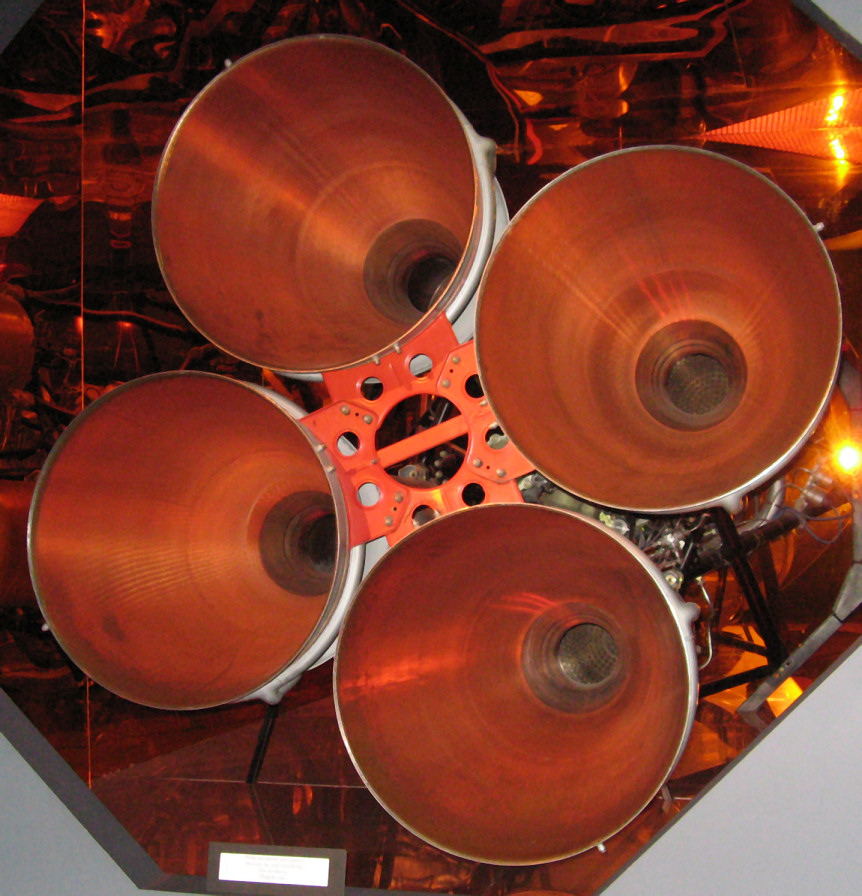
RD-107 rocket engine (first flight 1957)

Soviet rocketry commenced in 1921 with development of solid-fuel rockets, which resulted in the development of the Katyusha rocket launcher. Rocket scientists and engineers, particularly Valentin Glushko and Sergei Korolev, contributed to the development of liquid-fuel rockets, which were first used for fighter aircraft. Developments continued in the late 1940s and 1950s with a variety of ballistic missiles and ICBMs, and later for space exploration which resulted in the launch of Sputnik 1 in 1957, the first artificial Earth satellite ever launched.

== Origins ==
Russian involvement in rocketry began in 1903 when Konstantin Tsiolkovsky published a paper on liquid-propelled rockets (LPREs). Tsiolkovsky's efforts made significant advances in the use of liquid fuel. His work challenged traditional thought and sparked a revolution in science which embraced new ideas in rocket technology.

=== Solid Fuel: The first rockets ===
The first Soviet development of rockets was in 1921 when the Soviet military sanctioned the commencement of a small research laboratory to explore solid fuel rockets, led by Nikolai Tikhomirov, a chemical engineer and supported by Vladimir Artemyev a Soviet engineer. Tikhomirov had commenced studying solid and Liquid-fueled rockets in 1894, and in 1915 he lodged a patent for "self-propelled aerial and water-surface mines." In 1928 the laboratory was renamed the Gas Dynamics Laboratory (GDL). The First test-firing of a solid fuel rocket was carried out in March 1928, which flew for about 1,300 meters These rockets were used in 1931 for the world's first successful use of rockets to assist take-off of aircraft. Further developments were led by Georgy Langemak. and 1932 in-air test firings of RS-82 missiles from an Tupolev I-4 aircraft armed with six launchers successfully took place.

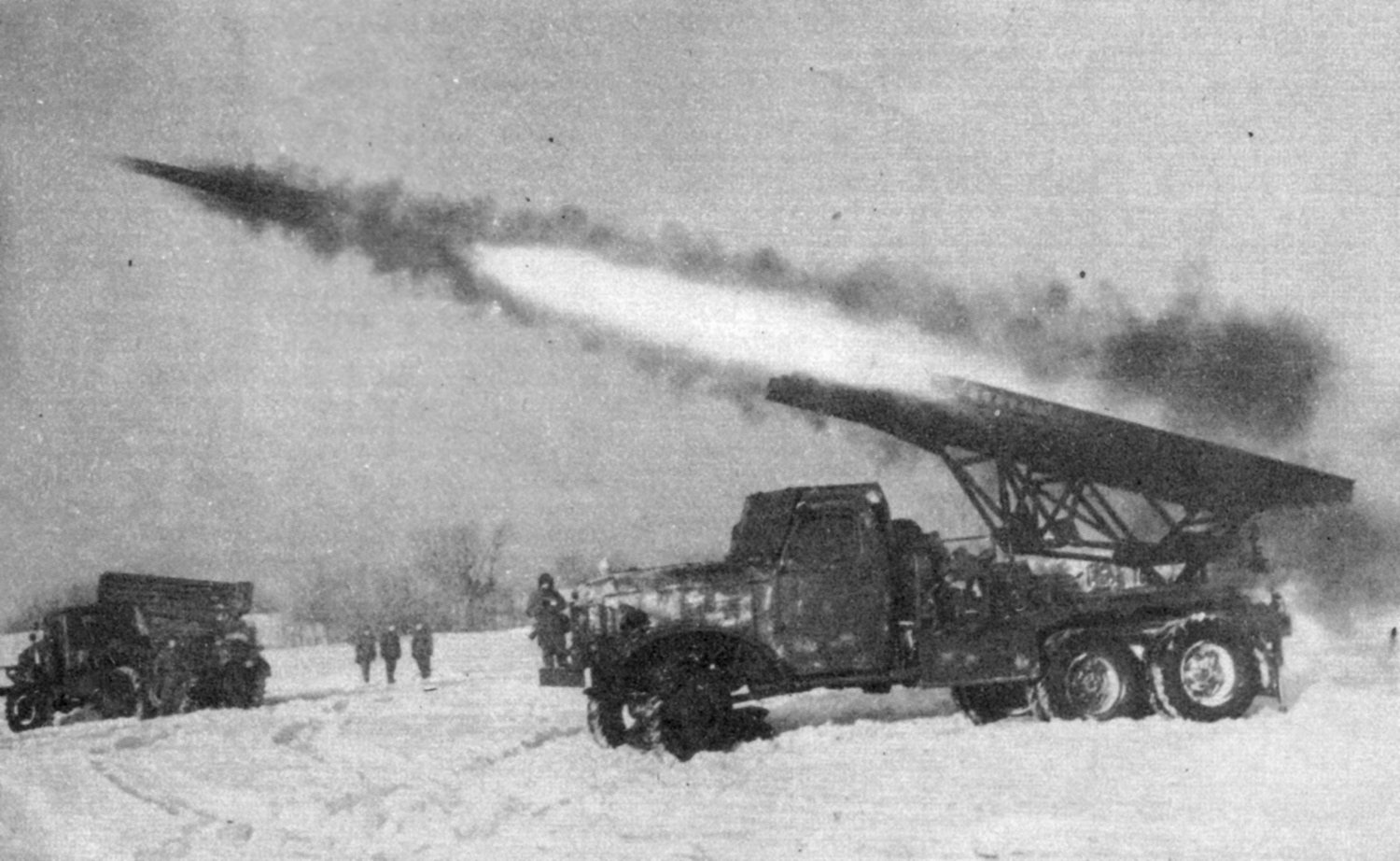
Katyusha rocket launcher in action.

The research continued from 1933 by the Reactive Scientific Research Institute (RNII) with the development of the RS-82 and RS-132 rockets, including designing several variations for ground-to-air, ground-to-ground, air-to-ground and air-to-air combat.

The earliest known use by the Soviet Air Force of aircraft-launched unguided anti-aircraft rockets in combat against heavier-than-air aircraft took place in August 1939, during the Battle of Khalkhin Gol, a flight of five Polikarpov I-16 equipped with RS-82 engaging Japanese aircraft. In the same year, as part of the attempted annexation of Finland, in the Winter War, PC-132 rockets were fired, from Tupolev SB bombers, against Finnish ground targets.

In June 1938, the RNII began developing a multiple rocket launcher based on the RS-132 rocket. In August 1939, the completed product was the BM-13 / Katyusha rocket launcher. Towards the end of 1938 the first significant large scale testing of the rocket launchers took place, 233 rockets of various types were used. A salvo of rockets could completely straddle a target at a range of 5,500 metres (3.4 mi).

=== Electric rocket engines ===
On 15 May 1929 a section at GDL was created to develop electric rocket engines, headed by 23 year old Valentin Glushko, Glushko proposed to use energy in electric explosion of metals to create rocket propulsion. In the early 1930s the world's first example of an electrothermal rocket engine was created. This early work by GDL has been steadily carried on and electric rocket engines were used in the 1960s on board the Voskhod 1 spacecraft and Zond-2 probe.

=== Liquid Fuel: The early contribution ===
In 1931 Glushko was redirected to work on liquid propellant rocket engines. This resulted in the creation of ORM (from "Experimental Rocket Motor" in Russian) engines ORM-1 to ORM-52. To increase the resource, various technical solutions were used: the jet nozzle had a spirally finned wall and was cooled by fuel components, curtain cooling was used for the combustion chamber and ceramic thermal insulation of the combustion chamber using zirconium dioxide. Nitric acid, solutions of nitric acid with nitrogen tetroxide, tetranitromethane, hypochloric acid and hydrogen peroxide were first proposed as an oxidizing agent. As a result of experiments, by the end of 1933, a high-boiling fuel from kerosene and nitric acid was selected as the most convenient in operation and industrial production. In 1931 self-igniting combustible and chemical ignition of fuel with gimbal engine suspension were proposed. For fuel supply in 1931–1932 fuel pumps operating from combustion chamber gases were developed. In 1933 a centrifugal turbopump unit for a rocket engine with a thrust of 3000 N was developed. A total of 100 bench tests of liquid-propellant rockets were conducted using various types of fuel, both low and high-boiling and thrust up to 300 kg was achieved.

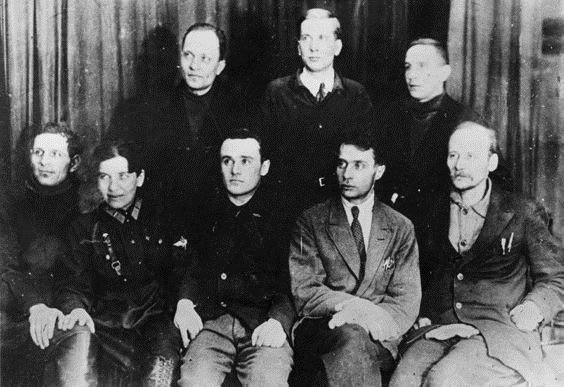
Members of GIRD. Left to right: standing I.P. Fortikov, Yu A Pobedonostsev, Zabotin; sitting: A. Levitsky, Nadezhda Sumarokova, Sergei Korolev, B.I. Cheranovsky, Friedrich Zander.

Concurrently with the work at GDL Friedrich Zander, a scientist and inventor, had begun work on the OR-1 experimental engine in 1929 while working at the Central Institute for Aircraft Motor Construction; It ran on compressed air and gasoline and Zander used it to investigate high-energy fuels including powdered metals mixed with gasoline. In September 1931 Zander formed the Moscow-based Group for the Study of Reactive Motion, better known by its Russian acronym "GIRD". Zander, who idolized Tsiolkovsky and the German rocket scientist Hermann Oberth, oversaw the development of Russia's first liquid fueled rocket, the GIRD 10. The rocket was launched successfully in 1933, and it reached an altitude of 1,300 feet (400 m), but Zander died before the test took place.

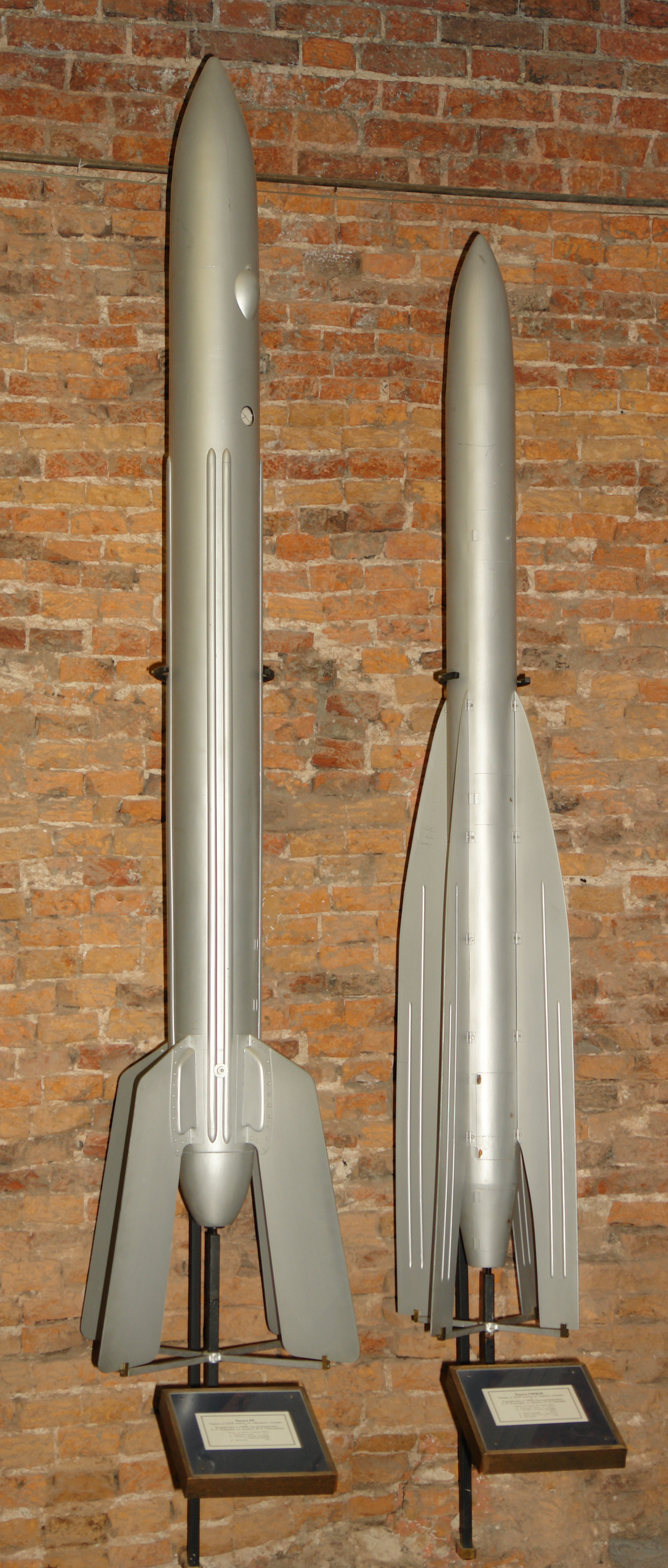
Rocket 09 (left) and 10 (GIRD-09 and GIRD-X). Museum of Cosmonautics and Rocket Technology; St. Petersburg.

GIRD began as the Jet Engine Section of a larger civil defense organization known as the Society for the Promotion of Defense and Aerochemical Development (Osoaviakhim). GIRD's role was to deliver practical jet engine technology to be employed in aerial military applications. Although branches of GIRD were established in major cities all throughout the Soviet Union, the two most active branches were those in Moscow (MosGIRD, formed in January 1931) and in Leningrad (LenGIRD, formed in November 1931). MosGIRD worked on the development of space research, liquid-propellant rockets, rocket design as it pertained to aircraft, and the construction of a supersonic wind tunnel (used for the aerodynamic testing of the aircraft that they developed), whereas LenGIRD developed solid-fuel rockets used for photographing the upper atmosphere, carrying flares, and atmospheric sounding.

Mikhail Klavdievich Tikhonravov, who would later supervise the design of Sputnik I and the Luna programme, headed GIRD's 2nd Brigade, was responsible for the first Soviet liquid propelled rocket launch, the GIRD-9, on 17 August 1933, which reached an altitude of 400 metres (1,300 ft).

In January 1933 Zander began development of the GIRD-X rocket (Note: "X" is the Roman numeral 10). It was originally to use a metallic propellant, but after various metals had been tested without success it was designed without a metallic propellant, and was powered by the Project 10 engine which was first bench tested in March 1933. This design burned liquid oxygen and gasoline and was one of the first engines to be regeneratively cooled by the liquid oxygen, which flowed around the inner wall of the combustion chamber before entering it. Problems with burn-through during testing prompted a switch from gasoline to less energetic alcohol. The final missile, 2.2 metres (7.2 ft) long by 140 millimetres (5.5 in) in diameter, had a mass of 30 kilograms (66 lb), and it was anticipated that it could carry a 2 kilograms (4.4 lb) payload to an altitude of 5.5 kilometres (3.4 mi). The GIRD X rocket was launched on 25 November 1933 and flew to a height of 80 meters.

Early pioneers in the field began to postulate that liquid fuels were more powerful than solid fuels. Some of the early fuels used by these scientists were oxygen, alcohol, methane, hydrogen, or combinations of them. A bitter rivalry developed between the researchers of these institutes.

=== Reactive Scientific Research Institute ===
In order to obtain maximum military benefits, the Red Army's chief-of-staff Marshal Mikhail Tukhacheskii merged GIRD with the GDL to study both fuel types. The new group was called Reactive Scientific Research Institute (RNII). When the two institutes combined, they brought together two of the most exceptional and successful engineers in the history of Soviet rocketry. Korolev teamed up with propulsion engineer Valentin Glushko, and together they excelled in the rocket industry, pushing the Soviet Union ahead of the United States in the space race. Before merging, the GDL had conducted liquid fuel tests and used nitric acid, while the GIRD had been using liquid oxygen. A brilliant, though often confrontational Sergei Korolev, headed the GIRD when it merged into RNII, and he was originally RNII's deputy director. Korolev's boss was a hard-nosed man from the GDL by the name of Kleimenov. Bitter in-fighting slowed the pace and quality of the research at RNII, but despite internal dissention, Korolev began to produce designs of missiles with liquid fueled engines. By 1932, RNII was using liquid oxygen with kerosene as a coolant as well as nitric acid and a hydrocarbon.

=== Applications in early aircraft ===
As a young adult, Sergei Korolev (1907–1966) had always been fascinated by aviation. At college, his fascination towards rocketry and space travel grew. He became one of the most important rocket engineers of Soviet aircraft technology, and became "Chief Designer" of the Soviet space program. Sergei Korolev was a vitally important member of GIRD, and later became the head of the Soviet space program. Korolev would play a crucial role in both the launch of Sputnik in 1957, and the mission which put Yuri Gagarin in space in 1961.

In 1931, Korolev had come to Zander with a conceptual design for a rocket-powered aircraft called the RP-1. This craft was essentially a glider, powered with one of GDL's rocket motors, the OR-2. The OR-2 was a rocket engine powered with gasoline and liquid oxygen, and produced a thrust of 500 newtons (110 lb_{f}). In May 1932, about a year before Zander died, Korolev became the director of GIRD. At this point, he continued developing his design for the RP-1, an updated version called the RP-2, and another craft that he called the RP-218. The plan for the RP-218 called for a two-seat rocket powered plane, complete with a pressurized cabin, a retractable undercarriage, and equipment for high altitude research. The design was never realized, though, because at the time, there was not a rocket powerful enough and light enough to make the RP-218 practical.

Instead of pursuing the RP-218, in 1935, Korolev and RNII began developing the SK-9, a simple wooden two-seat glider which was to be used for testing rocket engines. The rear seat was replaced with tanks holding kerosene and nitric acid, and the OR-2 rocket motor was installed in the fuselage. The resulting craft was referred to as the RP-318. The RP-318 was tested numerous times with the engine installed, and was deemed ready for test flights in April 1938, but the plane's development halted when Joseph Stalin's Great Purge severely damaged its progress. RNII was particularly affected with Director Kleymyonov and Chief Engineer Langemak arrested in November 1937, and later executed. Glushko was arrested in March 1938 and with many other leading engineers was imprisoned in the Gulag. Korolev was arrested in June 1938 and sent to a forced labour camp in Kolyma in June 1939. However, due to the intervention by Andrei Tupolev, he was relocated to a prison for scientist and engineers in September 1940. From 1937 to 1944 no serious work was carried out on long range rockets as weapons.

The Soviets began to redesign the thrust chambers of their rocket engines, as well as investigate better ignition systems. These research endeavors were receiving more attention and funding as Europe began its escalation into the chaos of World War II. The Soviet rocket program had developed engines with two-stage ignition and variable thrust nearly two years before Germany rolled out their Me 163. However, the Soviet engine was only on gliders for testing, and was not available for full-powered flight. The engine's thrust was too low, and pressure build-up caused systemic failures.

Toward the end of 1938, work resumed on the RP-318 at the 'Scientific-Research Institute 3' (NII-3)N II-3, which was the new title for RNII. The aircraft was repaired and modified, with the addition of a new, more powerful engine to replace the OR-2. The new engine (the ORM-65) had been originally designed for a use in a single-launch cruise missile, but was adapted so that it could be employed in a multi-use aircraft. For comparison to the OR-2, the new ORM-65 could produce a variable thrust between 700 and 1,400 newtons (160 and 310 lb_{f}). After extensive testing, on February 28, 1940, the new RP-318-1 was successfully tested in a full-powered flight; the craft attained a speed of 90 mph (140 km/h), reached an altitude of 1.8 miles (2.9 km), in 110 seconds of operation, and was landed safely when the fuel was exhausted. Although this was a momentous occasion in Russian jet development, further plans to enhance this aircraft were shelved, and when the German Army neared Moscow in August 1941, the RP-318-1 was burned to keep it away from the Germans.

== World War II ==
=== Katyusha rocket launchers ===
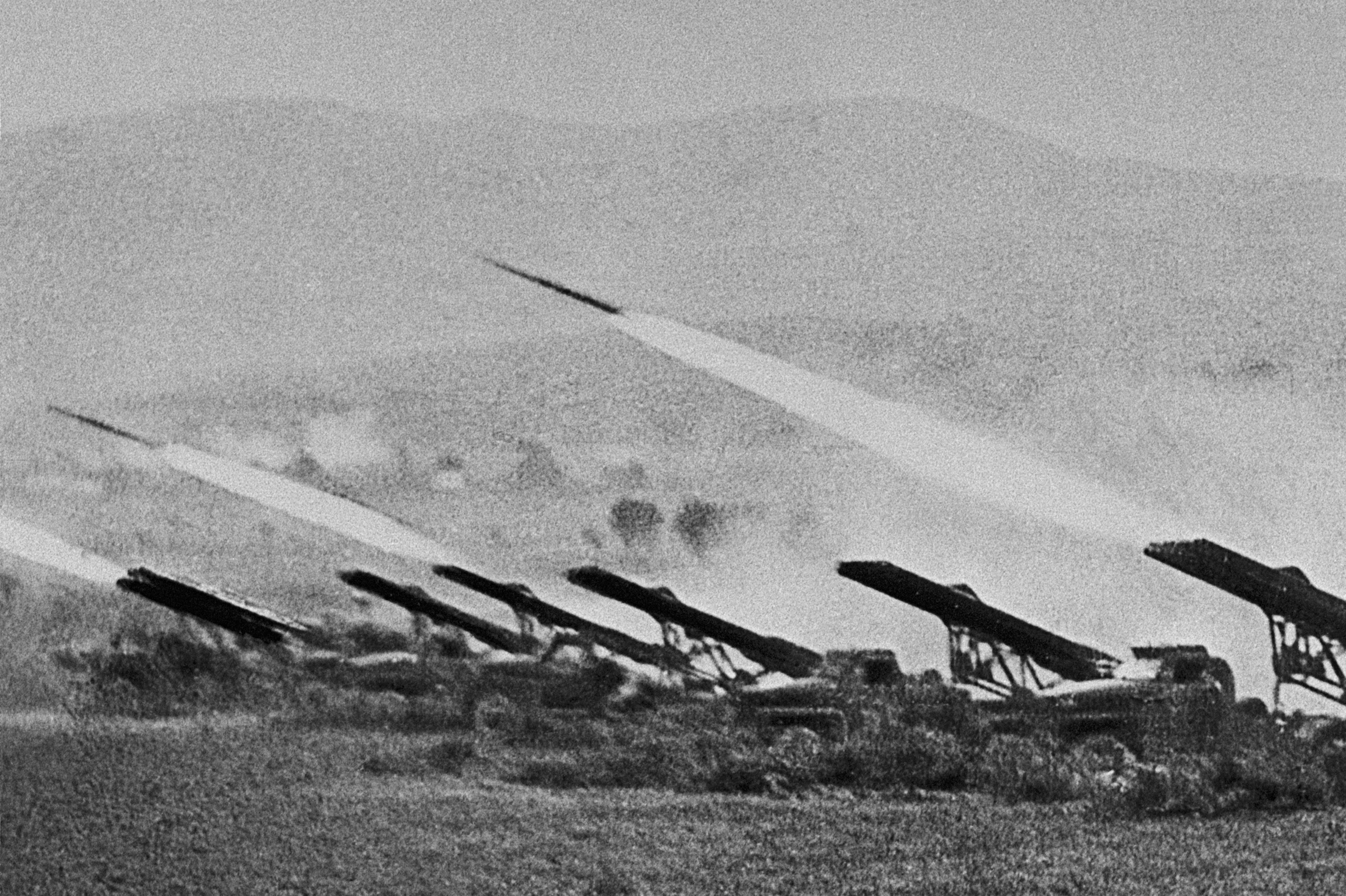
A battery of Katyusha launchers fires at German forces during the Battle of Stalingrad, 6 October 1942

The Katyusha rocket launchers were top secret in the beginning of World War II, however only forty launchers had been built. A special unit of the NKVD troops was raised to operate them. On July 14, 1941, an experimental artillery battery of seven launchers was first used in battle at Rudnya in Smolensk Oblast of Russia, under the command of Captain Ivan Flyorov, destroying a concentration of German troops with tanks, armored vehicles and trucks at the marketplace, causing massive German Army casualties and its retreat from the town in panic, see also in articles by a Russian military historian Andrey Sapronov, an eyewitness of the maiden launches. Following the success, the Red Army organized new Guards mortar batteries for the support of infantry divisions. A battery's complement was standardized at four launchers. They remained under NKVD control until German Nebelwerfer rocket launchers became common later in the war.

On August 8, 1941, Stalin ordered the formation of eight special Guards mortar regiments under the direct control of the Reserve of the Supreme High Command (RVGK). Each regiment comprised three battalions of three batteries, totalling 36 BM-13 or BM-8 launchers. Independent Guards mortar battalions were also formed, comprising 12 launchers in three batteries of four. By the end of 1941, there were eight regiments, 35 independent battalions, and two independent batteries in service, fielding a total of 554 launchers.

By the end of World War II total production of rocket launchers reached about 10,000, with 12 million rockets of the RS type produced for the Soviet armed forces.

=== Rocket powered aircraft ===
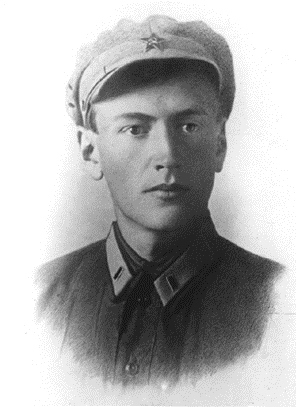
Mikhail Tikhonravov (in 1925)

The German invasion of Russia in the summer of 1941 led to an acute sense of urgency for the Soviets to develop practical rocket-powered aircraft. The Russian conventional air force was dominated by the Luftwaffe, with scores of their planes being shot down by individual German fighters. The Russians needed a superior weapon to counter the German air forces, and they looked to rocket-powered interceptor craft as the solution to their dilemma. In spring of 1941, Andrei Kostikov (the new director of N II-3, previously RN II) and Mikhail Tikhonravov began designing a new rocket-powered interceptor, the Kostikov 302.

The Kostikov 302 became the first Russian rocket plane that would have many features shared with modern fighter aircraft. It was built out of wood, with some aluminum, but it included a pressurized cockpit and retractable landing gear. Another key aspect of the Kostikov 302 was that it was equipped with hydraulic actuators, which allowed the pilot to fly the aircraft with more ease. These actuators, in effect the equivalent of power steering in a car, greatly reduced amount of force the pilots had to apply to control the plane. Because of the ongoing war with Germany, Russian officials strove to make the Kostikov aircraft a functional military asset as quickly as possible. This entailed outfitting it with armored glass, armored plates, several 20 mm cannons, and the option of a payload of either rockets or bombs under the wings. Although it had limited range, this aircraft became a serviceable tool for the purpose of brief forays, such as intercepting enemy aircraft. However, by 1944, the 302 was unable to reach Kostikov's performance requirements, in part because the engine technology was not keeping pace with the aircraft development.

The research teams made an important breakthrough in 1942: finally producing a tested and combat-ready rocket engine, the D-7-A-1100. This utilized a kerosene liquid fuel with a nitric acid oxidizer. However, the Nazi invasion had the Soviet high command centered on other matters, and the engine was never produced for use. During World War II, there is no record of any liquid fueled weapons being either produced or designed.

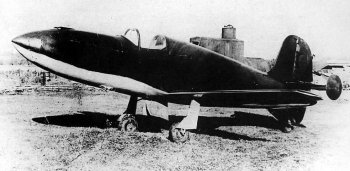
Bereznyak-Isayev BI-1

In May 1942 the Bereznyak-Isayev BI-1 was developed, however testing produced poor results.

== Post World War II ==
=== Captured A4 missiles ===
In 1945 the Soviets captured several key Nazi German A-4 (V-2) rocket production facilities, and also gained the services of some German scientists and engineers related to the project. In particular the Soviets gained control of the main V-2 manufacturing facility at Nordhausen. Under the supervision of the Special technical Commission (OTK) established by the Soviet Union to oversee rocketry operations in Germany, A-4s were assembled and studied. Eleven A-4s, six of them assembled at NII-88, the other five at Nordhausen, were launched from the Soviet launch site Kapustin Yar in 1947. Only five of the rockets reached their target, roughly the same reliability the rocket had under the Germans during the war. The experience derived from assembling and launching A4 rockets was directly applied to the Soviet copy, called the R-1.

=== R-1 missile ===
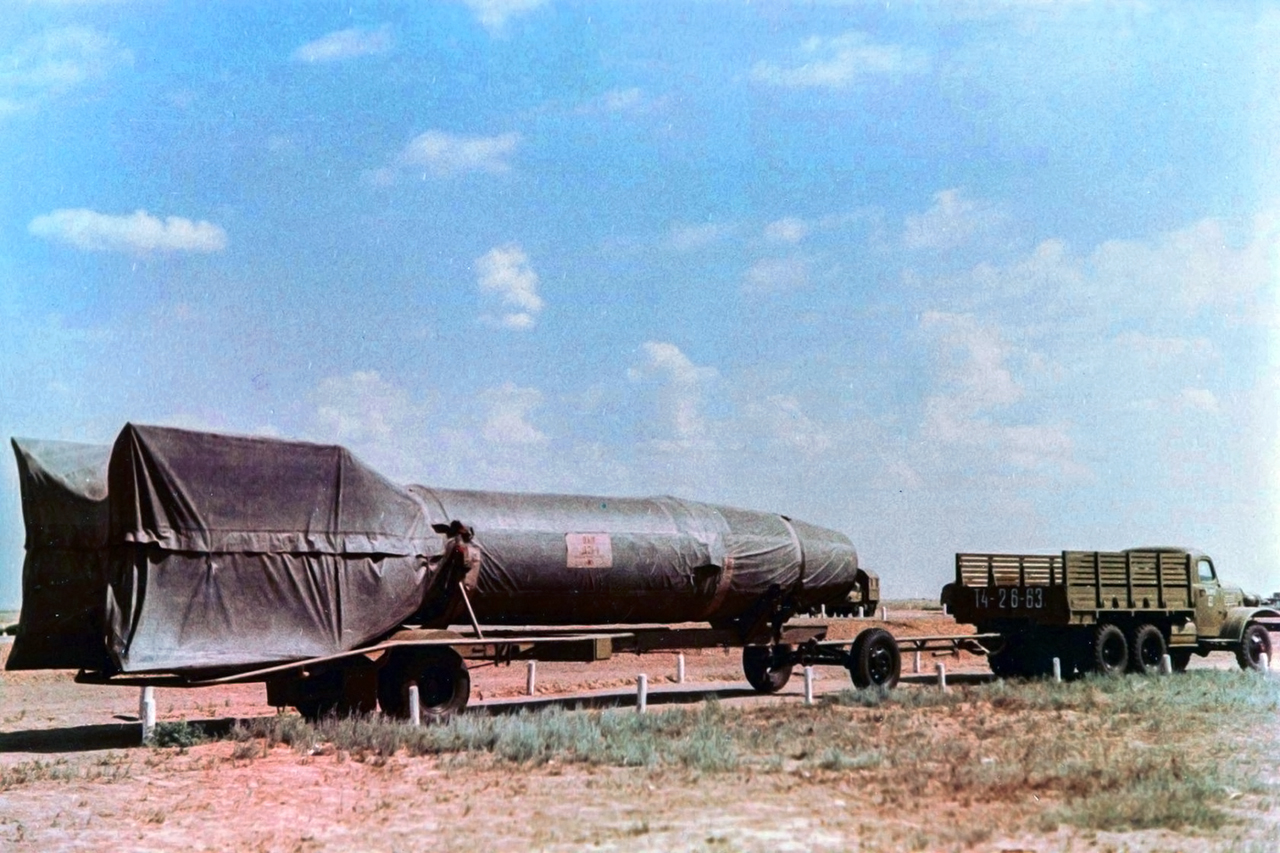
The first A4 rocket (from German stocks) is transported to the launch site on a truck trailer. It was launched on 18 October 1947 from the Kapustin Yar test site

The R-1 rocket (NATO reporting name SS-1 Scunner, Soviet code name SA11, was a tactical ballistic missile, the first manufactured in the Soviet Union, and closely based on the German A-4. Production was authorized by Josef Stalin in April 1947 with NII-88 chief designer Sergei Korolev overseeing the R-1's development.

The first tests of the missile began 13 September 1948. This first series revealed a variety of unforeseen issues that affected launch reliability and target accuracy. Six of the ten rockets in this series refused to leave the launch pad at all. Remedial improvements along with experimental design upgrades were made in 1949, with a second series of twenty tests starting in September and October. Launch reliability was 100% and only two missiles failed to reach their targets. The R-1 missile system entered into service in the Soviet Army on 28 November 1950.

Though the R-1 was a close copy of the German A-4, it was ultimately considerably more reliable than its predecessor thanks to improvements made on the original design. The rocket was 14,650 mm (577 in) in length, total weight of 13.5 tons and a dry weight of 4,015 kg (8,852 lb). 9.2 tons of the R-1's mass was devoted to propellant: 4 tons of ethyl alcohol and 5 tons of liquid oxygen, which fed the Soviet-designed RD-100 engine. The R-1 missile could carry a 785-kilogram (1,731 lb) warhead of conventional explosive to a maximum range of 270 kilometres (170 mi), with an accuracy of about 5 kilometres (3.1 mi). a range slightly greater than that of the A-4. The R-1 missile system entered into service in the Soviet Army on 28 November 1950. Deployed largely against NATO, it was never an effective strategic weapon. Nevertheless, production and launching of the R-1 gave the Soviets valuable experience which later enabled the USSR to construct its own much more capable rockets.

=== R-2 missile ===
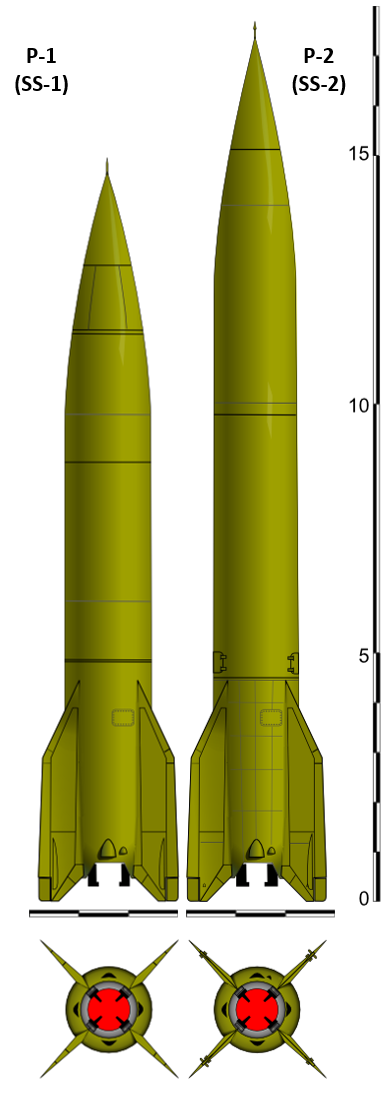
R-1 and R-2 rockets

The R-2 (NATO reporting name SS-2 Sibling) was a short-range ballistic missile developed from and having twice the range as the R-1 missile. By the latter half of 1946, Korolev and rocket engineer Valentin Glushko had, with extensive input from German engineers, outlined a successor to the R-1 with an extended frame and a new engine designed by Glushko. Korolev proposed commencement of the R-2 project in January 1947, but it was declined by the Soviet government, which favored development of the more technologically conservative R-1. On April 14, 1948, the same decree that authorized the operational production of the R-1 also sanctioned development of the R-2.

Test launches of an experimental version of the R-2, designated R-2E, began on 25 September 1949. Five of these slightly shorter (17 m (56 ft)) rockets were fired from Kapustin Yar, three of them successfully. Launches of the full-scale R-2 began on 21 October 1950, the last being fired on 20 December. None of the 12 flights in this series fulfilled their primary objectives due to engine failures, warhead trajectory errors, and malfunctions with the guidance systems.

A second series of tests was carried out between 2–27 July. The R-2 had been made more reliable by then, and twelve of the thirteen flights successfully reached their targets. A subsequent series of 18 launches in 1950–51 had 14 successes. Per an order dated 27 November 1951, the R-2 was formally adopted as operational armament for the Soviet Union. As with the R-1, reliability remained suboptimal. In a series of 14 operational R-2s test-launched in 1952, only 12 reached their target. The R-2 entered service in numbers in 1953 and was deployed in mobile units throughout the Soviet Union until 1962.

Like its predecessor, the R-1, the R-2 was a single-stage missile using ethanol as a fuel and liquid oxygen as an oxidizer. The R-2 had a range of 600 kilometres (370 mi), twice that of the R-1, while maintaining a similar payload of around 1,000 kilograms (2,200 lb). At a length of 17.65 m (57.9 ft) and a mass of 19,632 kg (43,281 lb), the R-2 was 2.5 m (8 ft 2 in) longer and the dry weight of 4,528 kg (9,983 lb) was about 500 kg (1,100 lb) heavier than the R-1. Maximum body diameter remained 1.65 m (5 ft 5 in), the same as the R-1.

=== R-5 Pobeda ===
The R-5 Pobeda (Побе́да, "Victory") was a medium range ballistic missile. The upgraded R-5M version, the first Soviet missile capable of carrying a nuclear weapon, was assigned the NATO reporting name SS-3 Shyster. The R-5 was able to carry the same 1,000 kilograms (2,200 lb) payload as the R-1 and R-2 but over a distance of 1,200 kilometres (750 mi).

In the spring of 1951 Korolev revised his A-3 plans to use the RD-103 engine, an evolution of the RD-101 used in the R-2 missile, and reduce the weight of the rocket through use of integrated tankage (while at the same time increasing propellant load by 60% over the R-2). Other innovations over the R-1/R-2 included small aerodynamic rudders run by servomotors to replace the big fins of the R-1/R-2, and longitudinal acceleration integrators to improve the precision of engine cutoff and thus accuracy. The R-5 missile used combined autonomous inertial control with lateral radio-correction for guidance and control.

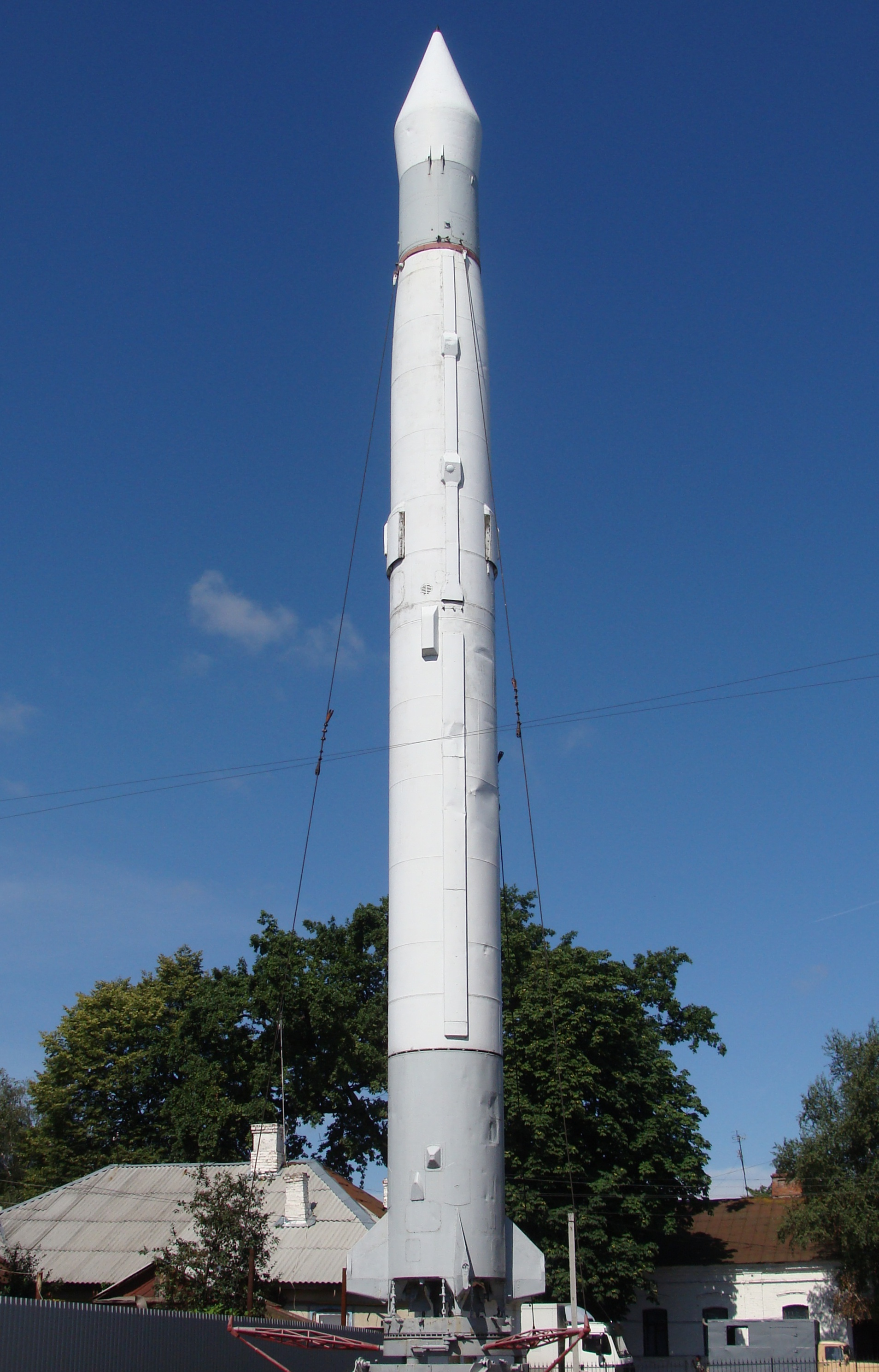
R-5 on display at the Zhytomyr Korolyov Museum

The R-5 underwent its first series of eight test launches from 15 March to 23 May 1953. After two failures, the third rocket, launched 2 April, marked the beginning of streak of success. Seven more missiles were launched between 30 October and December, all of which reached their targets. A final series of launches, designed to test modifications made in response to issues with the first series, was scheduled for mid-1954. These began 12 August 1954, continuing through 7 February 1955. These tests confirmed the soundness of the design and cleared the way for nuclear and sounding rocket variants. Upon the completion of the R-5 design, work began on the nuclear-capable R-5M with similar launch mass and range, but designed to carry a nuclear warhead Test flights of this new rocket flew from January 1955 through February 1956. The test on 2 February 1956 involved a live nuclear payload, with a yield of less than 3 kiloton.

The R-5 was a single-stage missile with a detachable warhead reentry vehicle with a range of 1,200 km (750 mi). Using 92% ethanol for fuel and liquid oxygen as an oxidizer, the rocket had a dry weight of 4,030 kg (8,880 lb) (fueled, 28,900 kg (63,700 lb)) and carried a detachable reentry vehicle with a payload capacity of 1,000 kg (2,200 lb). Quickly upgraded to the nuclear-capable R-5M, this missile was just under 21 m (69 ft) long and 1.652 m (5 ft 5.0 in) in diameter, had a dry weight of 4,390 kg (9,680 lb) (fueled, 29,100 kg (64,200 lb)), and carried a 1,350 kg (2,980 lb) payload. The R-5M was the Soviet Union's first real strategic missile, carrying a nuclear warhead yielding at least 80 kilotons (kt). Later, the R-5M received a 1 megaton (mt) thermonuclear warhead. The R-5M entered service in March 1956, was deployed along the western and eastern Russian borders, and in 1959 was installed in East Germany, the first Soviet nuclear missile bases outside the USSR. The missile was retired in 1967, superseded by the R-12.

=== R-7 Rocket ===
A 2-view drawing of the R-7 Semyorka

The R-7 Rocket was a Soviet missile developed during the Cold War as the R-7 Semyorka (Russian: Р-7 Семёрка). It was the world's first intercontinental ballistic missile, launched Sputnik 1, the first artificial satellite, into orbit, and became the basis for the R-7 family which includes Sputnik, Luna, Molniya, Vostok, and Voskhod space launchers, as well as later Soyuz variants. Several versions are still in use.

Design work began in 1953 at OKB-1 with the requirement for a missile with a launch mass of 170 to 200 tons, range of 8,500 km and carrying a 3,000 kg (6,600 lb) nuclear warhead, powerful enough to launch a nuclear warhead against the United States. In late 1953 the warhead's mass was increased to 5.5 to 6 tons to accommodate the then planned thermonuclear bomb.

The principle of a staged missile, also known as a "rocket packet", was first proposed by Mikhail Tikhonravov, which was supported by Korolev and expanded by Dmitry Okhotsimsky, which concluded that a core and four strap on boosters as the preferred model, which the R-7 used. The four strap on propulsion engines were powered by the RD-107 engine, each with two Vernier engines to assist with steering. The central core's RD-108 engine included four Vernier engines utilized for steering.

Instead of a free-standing missile which was launched from a horizontal pad, it turned out that assembling a cluster of a central core and four boosters on the pad is almost impossible without it falling apart. The solution was to eliminate the pad and to suspend the entire rocket in the trusses that bear both vertical weight load as well as horizontal wind forces.

The first successful long flight, of 6,000 km (3,700 mi), was made on 21 August 1957 with the missile reaching the target at Kamchatka. Five days later, TASS announced that the Soviet Union had successfully tested the worlds's first intercontinental ballistic missile.

The R-7 was initially 34 m (112 ft) long, 10.3 m (34 ft) in diameter and weighed 280 metric tons (280 long tons; 310 short tons); it had a single stage with four strap on boosters powered by rocket engines using liquid oxygen (LOX) and kerosene. The military version carried a single thermonuclear warhead with a nominal yield of 3 megatons of TNT.

The limitations of the R-7 pushed the Soviet Union into rapidly developing second-generation missiles and R-7 was phased out of military service by mid 1968. While the R-7 turned out to be impractical as a weapon, it became the basis for a series of Soviet expendable space launch vehicles, including Vostok family of launchers, Molniya and Soyuz family of launchers. As of 2018, in modified versions (Soyuz-U, Soyuz-FG, and the Soyuz-2 (including the boosterless 2.1v variant), the vehicle is still in service, having launched over 1,840 times. The R-7 is also a record holder in terms of longevity, with more than 50 years of service with its various modifications and it has become the world's most reliable space launcher.

== Advances in military systems ==
Over the course of the Cold War, the Soviet Union developed an estimated 500 LPRE rocket platforms. From 1958 to 1962, the Soviets researched and developed LPRE propelled anti-aircraft missile systems. These rockets primarily used nitric acid ratioed with a hypergolic amine for fuel.

The need for mobile nuclear forces began to increase as the Cold War escalated in the early 1950s. The idea of naval launched tactical nuclear weaponry began to take hold. By 1950, the USSR had developed submarine launched ballistic missiles. These missiles were multi stage, but due to fuel constraints, they could not be launched from underwater. The initial missile system used land based armaments. The USSR is the only known nation to utilize LPRE fueled engines for its SLBMs.

In 1982, the Soviets began testing of the RD-170. This nitric acid and kerosene propelled rocket was capable of producing more thrust than any engine available. The RD-170 had 4 variable thrusters with staged combustion. The engine experienced early technical difficulties, and it experienced massive damage as it was shut down in stages. To remediate this, Soviet engineers had to reduce its thrust capacity. The engine was officially flight tested successfully in 1985.

== Space age advances ==
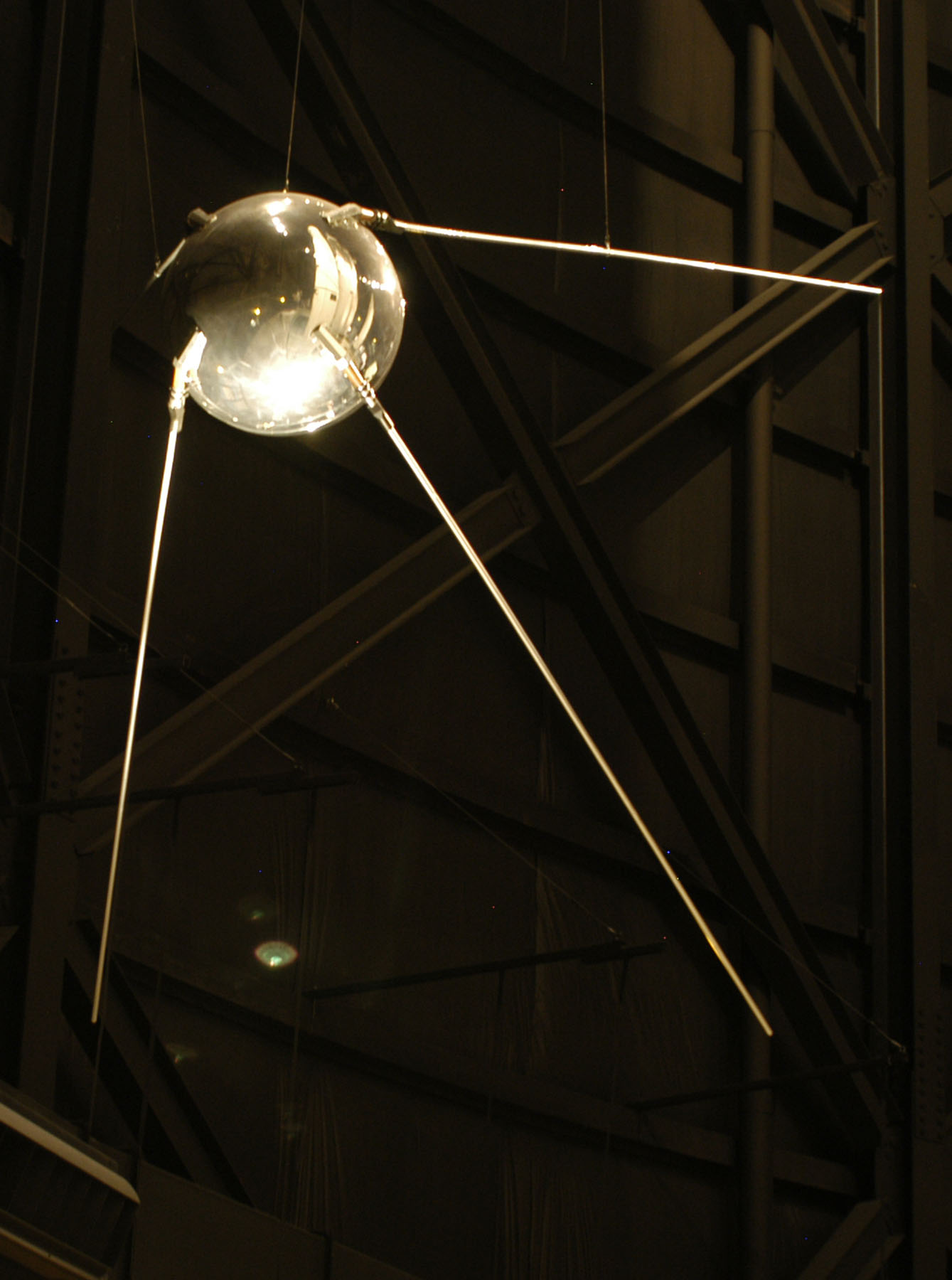
Sputnik I, the first artificial Earth satellite

Sputnik 1 was the first artificial Earth satellite ever launched. On October 4, 1957, the USSR launched Sputnik 1 into orbit and received transmissions from it. Sputnik 1 was designed to be the forerunner for multiple satellite missions. The technology constantly underwent upgrades as the weight of satellites increased. The first notable failure occurred during Sputnik 4, an unmanned test of the Vostok capsule. A guidance system malfunction pointed the capsule in the wrong direction for the orbit-exiting engine burn, sending it instead into a higher orbit, which decayed approximately four months later. The success of Sputnik 1 was followed by the launch of 175 meteorological rockets in the next two years. In all, there were ten of the Sputnik satellites launched.

The Soviet Space Program brought about numerous advances such as Sputnik 1. However, before the institution of the satellite probe, technology needed to be developed in order to ensure the success of the satellite. In order for the probe to be successful in space, a mechanism needed to be developed to get the object outside Earth's atmosphere. The propulsion system that was utilized to send Sputnik 1 into space was dubbed the R-7. The design of the R-7 was also unique for its time and allowed for the Sputnik 1 launch to be a success. One key aspect was the type of fuel utilized to propel the rocket. A main component of the fuel was UDMH which when combined with other compounds yielded a fuel that was both potent and stable at certain temperatures.

The ability to launch satellites came from the Soviet intercontinental ballistic missile (ICBM) arsenal, using the RD-107 engine for the Vostok launch vehicle. The first Vostok version had 1 core engine and 4 strap-on stage engines. The engines were all vectored thrust capable. The original Vostok was fueled by liquid oxygen and kerosene. There were a total of 20 engines, each capable of contributing 55,000 pounds-force (240 kN) of thrust. The Vostok engine was the first true Soviet design. The technical name was the RD-107 and later the RD-108. These engines had two thrust chambers. They were originally mono-propellant-burning using hydrogen peroxide fuel. This family of engines were utilized not just on the Vostok, but also on the Voskhod, Molniya, and Soyuz launch vehicles.

By 1959, the space program needed a 3-stage engine platform, so the Vostok engine was adapted accordingly for launching Moon probes. By 1963, the Vostok was equipped for 4-stage applications. This platform was used for the first multi-manned flight. As 1964 began, the Soviets introduced a new engine into its booster engine program, the RD-0110. This engine replaced the RD-107 in the second stage, in both the Molniya and Soyuz launch vehicles. These engines were liquid oxygen propelled, with kerosene coolant. The RD-0110 had four variable thrusters. This engine was unique because it initially was launched by a solid fuel propellant, but was fueled in flight by liquid oxygen.

This development caused a new problem for the Soviet scientific community, however. The Vostok was too powerful for newer satellites trying to reach low Earth orbit. The space community turned once again to the Soviet missile command. The new Intermediate Ballistic Missiles (IBRM) systems provided two engine options: the Sandal (1 stage), or the Skean (2 stage). Both systems were upgraded to a new RD-111 engine. Following these upgrades, the largest satellite called Proton I was launched in 1965. The type of engine used for Proton I was the RD-119. This engine provided nearly 13.3 million newtons (3.0 million pounds-force) of thrust, and was ultimately used to execute low Earth orbit.

December 8, 1957 the Soviet Union head of the Academy of Science addressed the United States in regard to the first artificial satellite that was sent off on October 4, 1957. It was his belief that part of this satellite had fallen back into the North American Continent. The Soviets were wanting the help of the Americans in order to recover the satellite components, however the United States was planning on viewing the satellite technology in order to develop their own satellites and rockets for propulsion and re-entry.

From the year 1961-1963 the Soviet Union wanted to improve on their designs. This led to the development of a new rocket for propulsion. This new rocket was dubbed the N1. This rocket was to become a sophisticated improvement on traditional Soviet design and would pave the way for numerous rocket launches. The specifications to the rocket were also astounding for its time. The amount of thrust generated by the rocket ranged from 10 to 20 tons of thrust which was capable of launching a 40–50 ton satellite into orbit. The man that played a crucial role in the development of this new rocket was Sergei Korolev. The development of the N1 rocket became the successor to other Soviet designed rockets such as the R-7. It also brought about ample competition to the United States' counterpart Moon rocket; the Saturn V. However, one key difference between the two rockets was the stages that occurred in a typical launch. Whereas the Saturn V had four-stages, the N1 had five stages. The fifth stage of the N1 was utilized for the landing position. The N1 was powered by engines such as the NK-33, NK-43, and NK-39. As revolutionary as this design style had become, the construction was not run as smoothly as expected. The clashing of ideas between scientists wanting to go public with their work and military entities wanting to keep the project as secretive as possible caused delays and hindered the project from progressing at times. As time progressed the N1 was prone to several design flaws. These flaws caused numerous failed launches because of the first stage in its design being faulty. The late 1960s yielded many failed launch attempts. Eventually the program was shut down.

== See also ==
- Soviet space program, the national space program of the Union of Soviet Socialist Republics (USSR) from 1955 to 1991.
- Strategic Rocket Forces, branch of the Soviet Armed Forces that controlled land-based intercontinental ballistic missiles (ICBMs) from 1959 to 1991. Now part of the Russian Armed Forces.
- Sergei Korolev (1907–1966), chief engineer and brain of the Soviet rocketry and space program, head of Experimental Design Bureau OKB-1
- Valentin Glushko (1908–1989), chief designer of rocket engines, head of OKB-456
- Dmitry Ustinov (1908–1984), military head of Soviet rocketry and space program, People's Commissar of Armaments from 1941, Defence Minister from 1976
- Boris Chertok (1912–2011), control systems designer

== Cited sources ==
- Baker, David; Zak, Anatoly (9 September 2013). Race for Space 1: Dawn of the Space Age. RHK.
- Chertok, Boris (2005). Rockets and People Volumes 1–4. National Aeronautics and Space Administration.
- Siddiqi, Asif (2000). Challenge to Apollo : the Soviet Union and the space race, 1945–1974 (PDF). Washington, D.C.: National Aeronautics and Space Administration, NASA History Div.
- Stoiko, Michael (1970). Soviet rocketry: past, present, and future. Holt, Rinehart and Winston. ISBN 9780030818653.
- van Pelt, Michel (2012). Rocketing Into the Future: The History and Technology of Rocket Planes. Springer Science & Business Media. ISBN 978-1-4614-3200-5.
- Zaloga, Steven J; Grandsen, James (1984). Soviet Tanks and Combat Vehicles of World War Two. London: Arms and Armour Press. ISBN 0-85368-606-8.

== Bibliography ==
- Burgess, Colin, and Hall, Rex. The First Soviet Cosmonaut Team: Their Lives, Legacy, and Historical Impact. Berlin: Springer, 2009.
- Chertok, B. E. Rockets and People: Volume II. Washington, D.C.: NASA, 2006. Accessed April 7, 2016.
- Chertok, Boris Evseyevich. Rockets and People: Volume IV: The Moon Race. Washington, D.C.: National Aeronautics and Space Administration, NASA History Office, Office of External Affairs, 2005.
- Darrin, Ann Garrison and O'Leary, Beth Laura. Handbook of Space Engineering, Archaeology, and Heritage. Boca Raton: Taylor & Francis, 2009.
- Faure, Gunter, and Mensing, Teresa M. Introduction to Planetary Science: The Geological Perspective. Dordrecht: Springer, 2007.
- Harvey, Brian. Russian Planetary Exploration: History, Development, Legacy, Prospects. Berlin: Springer, 2007.
- "Konstantin Tsiolkovsky". Florida International University. Accessed 08 Apr. 2016.
- "Konstantin Tsiolkovsky." NASA. Accessed 08 Apr. 2016. <https://www.nasa.gov/audience/foreducators/rocketry/home/konstantin- tsiolkovsky.html>
- Lethbridge, Cliff. "History of Rocketry Chapter 6: 1945 to the Creation of NASA." Spaceline. (2000). Accessed April 7, 2016. http://www.spaceline.org/history/6.html.
- "Sergei Korolev." Russian Space Web. Web, Accessed 08 Apr. 2016.
- "Yury Alekseyevich Gagarin." Encyclopædia Britannica.
