= Leonid Dushkin =

Soviet rocket engineer

Leonid Stepanovich Dushkin (Леонид Степанович Душкин) (August 15, 1910 in the Spirove settlement of the Tver region – April 4, 1990), was a major pioneer of Soviet rocket engine technology.

He graduated from Moscow State University with a degree in mathematics and mechanics. In October 1932, he joined Fridrikh Tsander's brigade of GIRD, the Moscow rocket research group. He assisted in the creation of their first rocket engine OR-2, and after Tsander's death, he oversaw the creation of engine "10" which powered the first Soviet liquid-fuel rocket, GIRD-X.

Dushkin became part of the Reactive Scientific Research Institute (RNII) when GIRD and the Gas Dynamics Laboratory (GDL) merged in 1933.

Dushkin's engines were among the first to be regeneratively cooled, and he also experimented with uncooled engines of high-temperature ceramic. The 12K engines were both types, and powered the Aviavnito rocket.

After the arrest of Valentin Glushko, Dushkin took over the development of rocket engines for the rocket-enhanced fighter plane RP-318. He became the leader of the department of liquid propellant rocket engines the NII-3 beginning in January 1938. Starting with Glushko's engines (ORM-65 and RD-1), he began a series of important engineering transformations, moving the fuel injectors to a head at one end of a cylindrical chamber, typical of modern design. The RDA-150, RDA-300 used nitric acid as an oxidizer, RDK-150 used liquid oxygen.

The 1100 kgf thrust engine, D-1-A-1100 was developed for the rocket-powered interceptor BI-1. It was also regeneratively cooled, using the kerosine to cool the chamber, and the nitric acid to cool the nozzle. Starting with that engine, Aleksei Mihailovich Isaev began the evolution of his engines, which continued the evolution of engines toward the space-rocket engines of the 1950s.
