= Keldysh Research Center =

Subsidiary of Roscosmos

Coordinates: 55.8481°N 37.5206°E

- Company type: Federal state unitary enterprise
- Founded: 31 October 1933
- Headquarters: Moscow, Russia
- Number of employees: 881
- Parent: Roscosmos
- Website: www.kerc.msk.ru

The State Scientific Centre Keldysh Research Center (Russian: Центр Келдыша) is a research institute in Moscow, Russia. It is based at 8 Onezhskaya Street (street article in Russian Wikipedia).

== History ==
Prior to World War II it was known as the Reactive Scientific Research Institute (or Jet Propulsion Research Institute or shortly Jet Institute) or Research Institute for Jet Propulsion (commonly known by the joint initialism RNII; Russian: Реактивный научно-исследовательский институт, romanized: Reaktivnyy nauchno-issledovatel’skiy institut), and was responsible for the development of the Katyusha rocket launcher.

Until 1991 it was known as the Scientific Research Institute of Thermal Processes (NII Thermal Processes, NIITP; НИИ тепловых процессов, НИИТП), conducting research and development in the areas of electrophysics, space instrumentation, propulsion, and power units. Like other organizations formerly subordinate to the Soviet Ministry of General Machine Building, NIITP marketed its products through Obshchemashexport.

It is now named after M. V. Keldysh, one of the key figures behind the Soviet space program. It is a Federal State Unitary Enterprise that is part of the Russian Space Agency. According to the World Nuclear Association, the center is developing a nuclear reactor for space that was suggested to be launched in 2020.

== See also ==
- Gas Dynamics Laboratory
- Group for the Study of Reactive Motion
