= RS-82 (rocket family) =

Air-launched rocket family

RS-82 and RS-132 (Russian: Реактивный Снаряд, Reaktivny Snaryad; rocket-powered projectile) were unguided rockets used by Soviet military during World War II.

== Development ==
Design work on RS-82 and RS-132 rockets began in the late 1920s, by the Gas Dynamics Laboratory (GDL) led by Georgy Langemak, and including Nikolai Tikhomirov, Vladimir Artemiev, Boris Petropavlovsky, Yuriy Pobedonostsev, and others. The 82 mm (3.2 in) and 132 mm (5.2 in) diameters were chosen because the standard smokeless gunpowder charge used at the time was 24 mm (0.94 in) in diameter and seven of these charges fitted into an 82 mm cylinder. The first test-firing of a solid fuel rocket was carried out in March 1928, which flew for about 1,300 meters and in 1932 in-air test firings of RS-82 missiles from an Tupolev I-4 aircraft armed with six launchers successfully took place. In 1933 GDL became part of the Reactive Scientific Research Institute, where development of the rockets continued. In 1937, aerodynamically efficient RO-82 rail launchers were designed for mounting these weapons on aircraft.

== Operational history ==
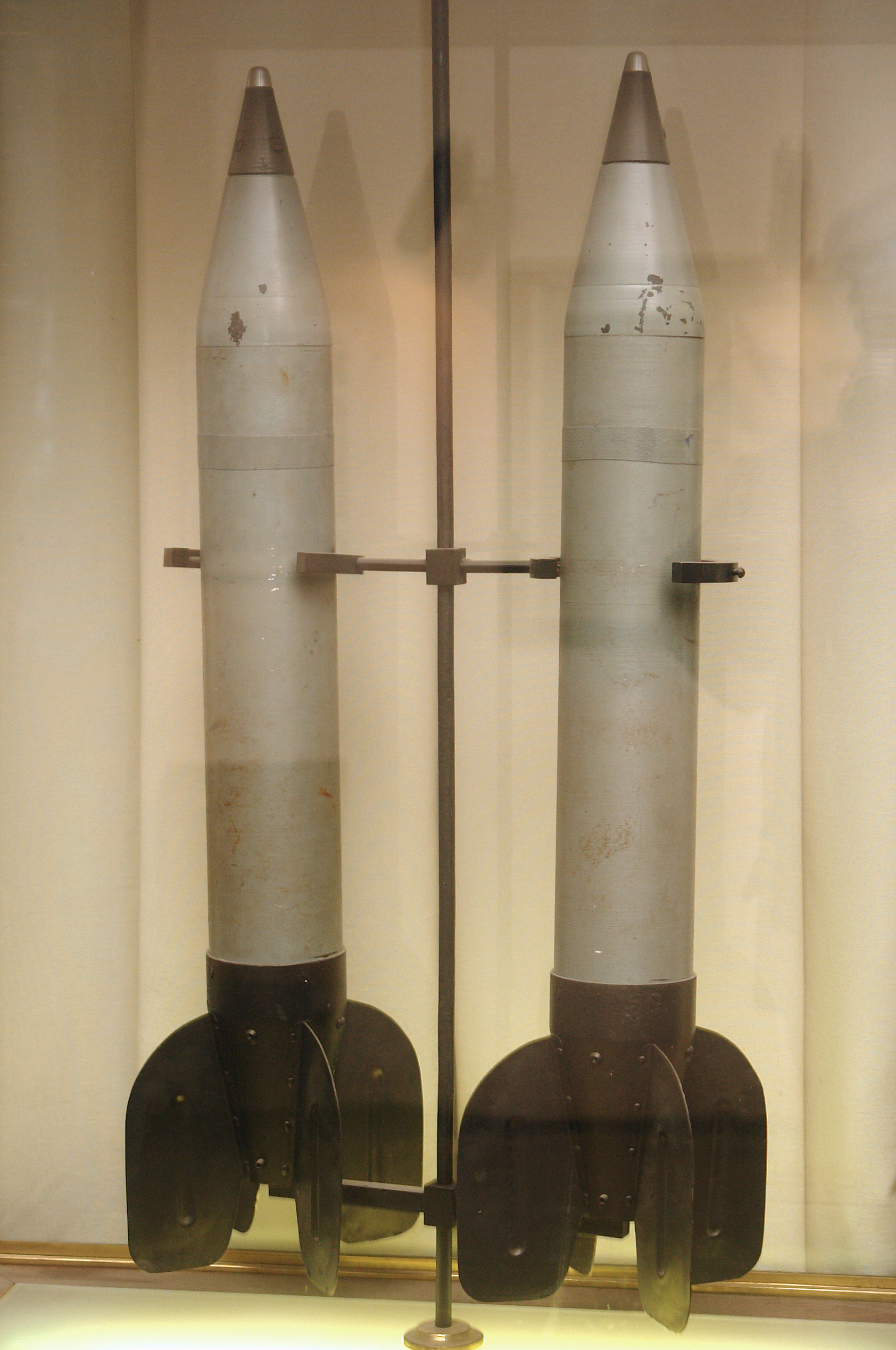
RS-82

RS-82 officially entered service in 1937 and RS-132 in 1938. The RS-82 missiles were carried by Polikarpov I-15, I-16 and I-153 fighter planes, the Polikarpov R-5 reconnaissance plane and the Ilyushin Il-2 close air support plane, while the heavier RS-132 missiles could be carried by bombers. Many small ships of the Soviet Navy were also fitted with the RS-82 missile, including the MO-class small guard ship.

The earliest known use by the Soviet Air Force of aircraft-launched unguided anti-aircraft rockets in combat against heavier-than-air aircraft took place in August 1939, during the Battle of Khalkhin Gol. A group of Polikarpov I-16 fighters under the command of Captain N. Zvonarev were using RS-82 rockets against Japanese aircraft, shooting down 16 fighters and 3 bombers in total. In the same year, as part of the attempted annexation of Finland, in the Winter War, six RS-132 rockets were fired, from Tupolev SB bombers, against Finnish ground targets.

Like most unguided rockets, RS suffered from poor accuracy. Early testing demonstrated that, when fired from 500 m (1,640 ft), a mere 1.1% of 186 fired RS-82 hit a single tank and 3.7% hit a column of tanks. RS-132's accuracy was even worse, with no hits scored in 134 firings during one test. Combat accuracy was even worse, since the rockets were typically fired from even greater distances. The RS-82 could destroy a tank with a direct hit and the larger RS-132 could knock out a tank with a near miss. Best results were usually attained when firing in salvos against large ground targets.

Almost every Soviet military aircraft of World War II was known to carry RS-82 and RS-132, often using field-made launchers. Some Ilyushin Il-2 were field-modified to carry up to 24 rockets although the added drag and the weight made this arrangement impractical. A total 12 million missiles of the RS-type were used by Soviet forces during World War II.

RS-derived M-8 and M-13 rockets were used by the famous Katyusha rocket artillery.

== Variants ==
- RS-82 and RS-132 - earlier high-explosive warhead (HE-Frag)
- RBS-82 and RBS-132 - armor-piercing warhead (APHE)
- ROFS-82 and ROFS-132 - later high-explosive warhead (HE-Frag)
- M-8 - improved RS-82 with a larger warhead (0.64 kg (1.4 lb) of explosives) and rocket motor for BM-8 Katyusha
- M-13 - improved RS-132 with a much larger warhead (4.9 kg (10.8 lb) of explosives) and rocket motor for BM-13 Katyusha.

== Specifications (RS-82) ==
- Body diameter: 82 mm (3.2 in)
- Wingspan: 200 mm (8 in)
- Length: 600 mm (24 in)
- Weight: 6.8 kg (15 lb)
- Explosive weight: 0.45 kg (0.99 lb)
- Fragmentation radius: 7 m (23 ft)
- Maximum speed: 340 m/s (1,115 ft/s)
- Range: 6.2 km (3.9 mi)
- Spread: 16 angular mil

== Specifications (RS-132) ==
- Body diameter: 132 mm (5.2 in)
- Wingspan: 300 mm (11 in)
- Length: 845 mm (33 in)
- Weight: 23.0 kg (50 lb)
- Explosive weight: 0.9 kg (2 lb)
- Fragmentation radius: 10 m (33 ft)
- Maximum speed: 350 m/s (1,150 ft/s)
- Range: 7.1 km (4.4 mi)
- Spread: 16 angular mil

== See also ==
- High Velocity Aircraft Rocket
- Le Prieur rocket
- List of aircraft weapons
- RP-3 – British 3 inch rocket, known as "60lb"
- Soviet rocketry
