= Mikhail Tikhonravov =

Soviet rocket scientist (1900–1974)

- Михаил Тихонравов
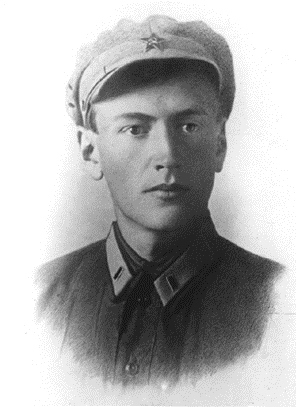
- Tikhonravov in 1925
- Born: 29 July 1900; Vladimir, Russian Empire
- Died: 4 March 1974 (aged 73); Moscow, Soviet Union
- Citizenship: Soviet
- Education: Zhukovsky Air Force Engineering Academy
- Awards: Hero of Socialist Labour; Order of Lenin; Order of the Red Banner; Order of the Patriotic War; Medal "For the Victory over Germany in the Great Patriotic War 1941–1945"; Medal "For Valiant Labour in the Great Patriotic War 1941–1945"
- Scientific career
- Fields: Aerospace engineering
- Workplaces: Moscow Aviation Institute

Mikhail Klavdievich Tikhonravov (29 July 1900 – 3 March 1974) was a Soviet engineer who was a pioneer of spacecraft design and rocketry.

Mikhail Tikhonravov was born in Vladimir, Russia. He attended the Zhukovsky Air Force Academy from 1922 to 1925, where he was exposed to Konstantin Tsiolkovsky's ideas of spaceflight. After graduation he worked in several aircraft industries and was engaged in developing gliders. From 1931 he devoted himself to rocketry. In 1932, he joined Group for the Study of Reactive Motion (GIRD), as one of the four brigade leaders. His brigade built the GIRD-09 rocket, fueled by liquid oxygen and jellied gasoline, and launched on 17 August 1933.

Tikhonravov became part of the Reactive Scientific Research Institute (RNII) when GIRD and the Gas Dynamics Laboratory (GDL) merged in 1933. From 1938 Tikhonravov researched rocket engines with liquid fuel and developed rockets for the purpose of upper atmosphere research. In the end of the 1930s, the development of rockets with liquid fuel was stopped and Tikhonravov concentrated on the development of the projectiles of the weapon system Katyusha rocket launcher.

In 1946, he became deputy chief of NII-4 in the Academy of Artillery Science and developed Project VR-190. Tikhonravov in 1948 proposed a type of multistage rocket in which the engines would work in parallel (packet) in order to achieve a greater flight range. His announcement was met with ridicule and skepticism by his scientific colleagues because at that time, it was believed that 1,000 km was the absolute limit for rocket range. In NII-4 he led a team of researchers that did important studies on packet rockets, satellite orbital motion, optimal pitch control programs for launching into orbit, reentry trajectories and heat shielding. This team designed Sputnik-3, Luna-1, Luna-3, Luna-4 and the early Venus and Mars probes. In 1956, Sergey Korolev had Tikhonravov and his team (including Mstislav Keldysh) transferred into his bureau, OKB-1.

After the launch of Sputnik-1 and a satellite with a dog on board, Tikhonravov (along with a number of other scientists) received the Lenin award (1957).

While he was not credited for much of his work, he was a lead scientist for the Sputnik 1 rocket and satellite.

He designed the first Soviet liquid-propellant rocket, he proposed the clustered-booster idea for the famous R-7 rocket, he oversaw the design of Yuri Gagarin’s Vostok rocket, and he supervised the development of the first Soviet moon probes. He also played a large role in the development of Sputnik 1.

The classically educated Tikhonravov has been credited for coining and popularizing the term cosmonaut ("space traveller"), to be distinct from the English astronaut.

Tikhonravov Crater on Mars is named after Mikhail Tikhonravov.

== Literature ==
- "Rockets and people" – B. E. Chertok, M: "mechanical engineering", 1999. ISBN 5-217-02942-0
- "S. P. Korolev. Encyclopedia of life and creativity" - edited by C. A. Lopota, RSC Energia. S. P. Korolev, 2014 ISBN 978-5-906674-04-3
