= Ivan Kleymyonov =

Soviet scientist

Ivan Terentyevich Kleymyonov (last name also spelled Kleymenov; Russian: Иван Терентьевич Клеймёнов; Staraya Surava, Tambov Governorate; April 11, 1899 – January 10, 1938) was a Soviet scientist and one of the founders of Soviet rocketry.

Ivan Kleymyonov graduated from the Zhukovsky Air Force Engineering Academy in 1928. In 1932–1933, he headed the Gas Dynamics Laboratory and then was appointed director of the Reactive Scientific Research Institute.

In 1937, during Stalin's "Great Purge," he was arrested on unknown grounds, sentenced to death and executed based on false confessions coerced from others, including Georgy Langemak. In 1955, he was rehabilitated "due to the lack of a criminal matter" and awarded Hero of Socialist Labor (1991).

A crater on the far side of the Moon is named after him.
