= Reactive Scientific Research Institute =

Early Soviet rocket laboratory

Reactive Scientific Research Institute (RNII)
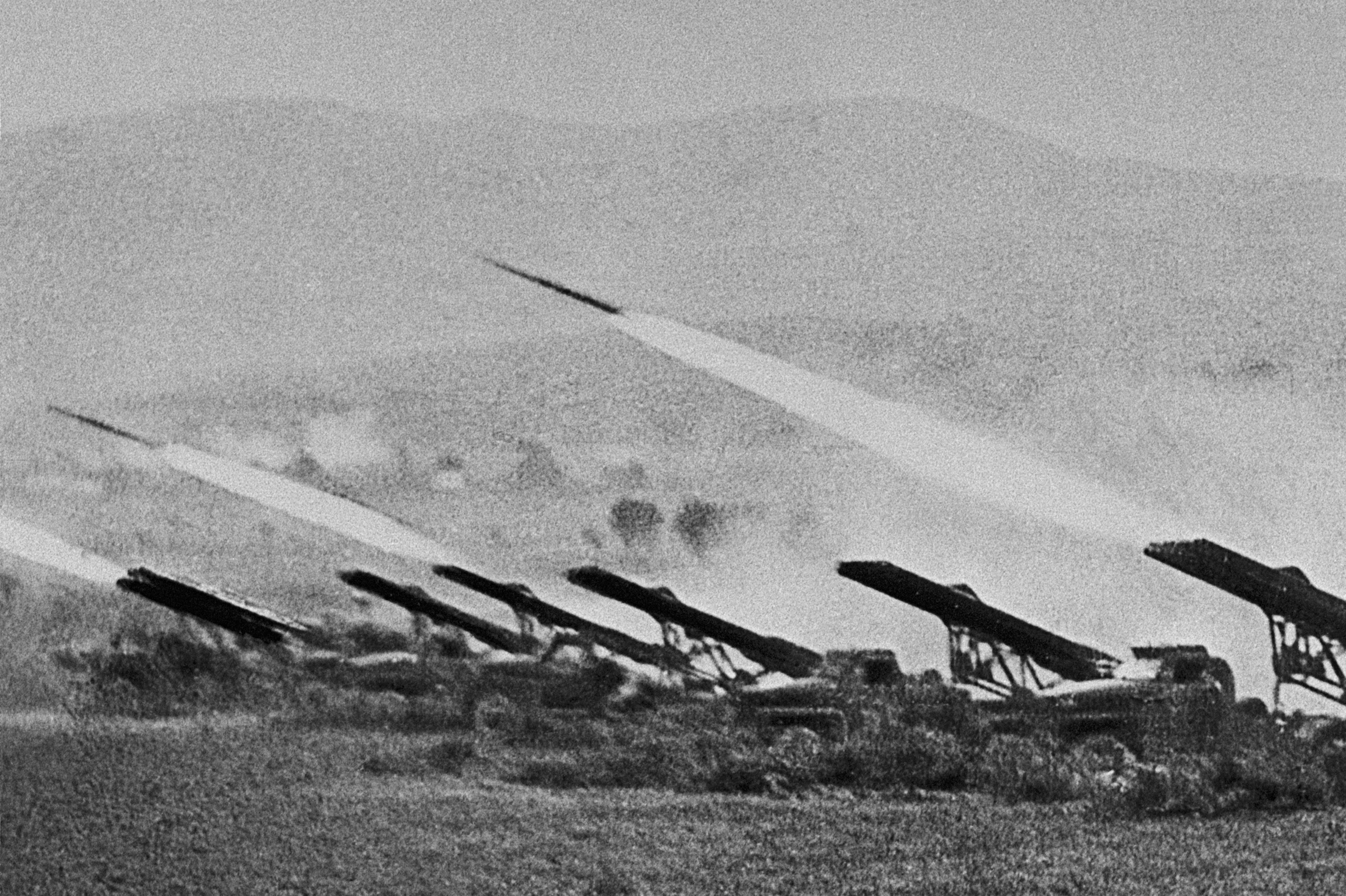
- Katyusha rocket launchers firing during WWII, which were created at RNII
- Parent institution: People's Commissariat of Heavy Industry
- Founders: Gas Dynamics Laboratory and Group for the Study of Reactive Motion
- Established: 21 September 1933
- Key people: Sergei Korolev, Valentin Glushko
- Address: Onezhskaya St, 8/10
- Location: Moscow, RSFSR, USSR
- Dissolved: 18 February 1944 transferred to the Scientific-Research Institute 1 (NII-1)

Reactive Scientific Research Institute (commonly known by the joint initialism RNII; Russian: Реактивный научно-исследовательский институт, romanized: Reaktivnyy nauchno-issledovatel’skiy institut) (Note: The word “reaktivnyy” means “reactive” in Russian and is commonly used to denote "jet propulsion". However in the 1930s and 1940s "reactive" was normally used to describe both jet and rocket propulsion. In the case of RNII it was primarily used to describe what we would now call rocket propulsion.) was one of the first Soviet research and development institutions to focus on rocket technology. RNII developed the Katyusha rocket launcher and its research and development were very important for later achievements of the Soviet rocket and space programs.

== History ==
The 'Reactive Scientific Research Institute' (RNII) was officially established on 21 September 1933 by combining the Group for the Study of Reactive Motion (GIRD) with the Gas Dynamics Laboratory (GDL). Personnel based in Leningrad were relocated to Moscow.

=== Background ===
Before 1931 there were two Soviet organizations devoted to researching rocket technology, the Leningrad-based GDL, and the mainly Moscow-based GIRD. The benefits of combining the two groups were recognized, particularly by Marshal Mikhail Tukhachevsky, the deputy People’s Commissar of Military and Naval Affairs (Narkomvoyenmor) and Deputy Chairman of the Revolutionary Military Council (Revvoyensovet). Tukhachevskiy, as a leading Soviet military leader, understood the benefits of rocket technology to military affairs and the requirement that it be supported by research, development, and engineering support.

=== Timeline ===
- 21 September 1933 – creation of RNII from the merger of GDL and GIRD.
- 31 October 1933 – RNII transferred to the responsibility of the People's Commissariat of Heavy Industry
- January 1937 – RNII was renamed Scientific-Research Institute 3 (NII-3) and transferred to the responsibility of the People’s Commissariat of the Defense Industry.
- 1939 – NII-3 was transferred to the responsibility of the People’s Commissariat of Ammunitions.
- 15 July 1942 – NII-3 was renamed State Institute of Reactive Technology (GIRT) directly reporting to the USSR Council of People’s Commissars.
- February 1944 – GIRT was transferred to the responsibility of the People’s Commissariat of Aviation Industry and renamed Scientific-Research Institute 1 (NII-1).

=== Organization ===
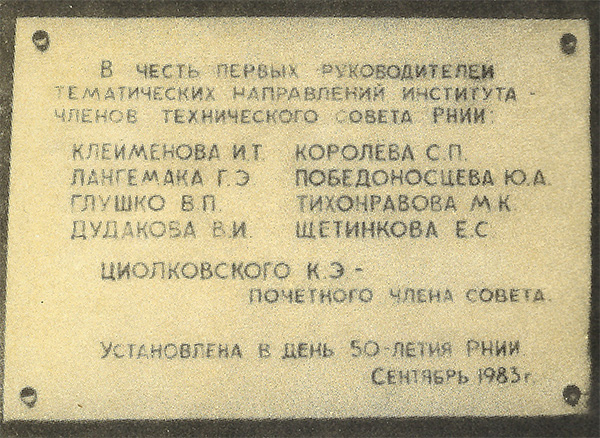
Memorial plaque in honor of the first members of the Technical Council of RNII.

The first Director of RNII was Ivan Kleymyonov, (1931–1937) the former head of GDL. Sergey Korolev, the previous head of GIRD, was appointed as his deputy. However in 1934, following a disagreement over the direction of RNII, Korolev was demoted to section chief of winged missiles and was replaced by Georgy Langemak. (Note: 11.01.1934. the position of deputy head of the RNII was eliminated, and instead of it the post of chief engineer was introduced.) Langemak was also the chairman of the initial technical advisory board, which provided the sanctioned scientific direction of RNII. The initial advisory board was composed of Glushko, Korolev, Pobedonostsev, Tikhonravov, and Dudakov. Other leaders of RNII consisted of Director Boris Slonimer (30.10.1937 – 1941) and Director Andrey Kostikov (1942–1944).

In the initial period, RNII had four departments:

- The first department was engaged in the development of solid fuel engines and rockets (Y. A. Pobedonostsev, K. K. Glukharev, L. E. Schwartz);
- The Second Division developed liquid fuel engines (M. K. Tikhonravov, A. I. Stenyaev, A. G. Kostikov); Brigades of liquid-propellant engines – V. P. Glushko and L. S. Dushkin;
- The Third Division dealt with cruise missiles (P.P. Zuykov): cruise missiles — E. S. Shchetinkov, jet launch — V. I. Dudakov;
- The fourth department investigated the properties of solid fuels (I. S. Alexandrov).

Total personnel at RNII ranged from 403 in 1935 to a peak of 836 in 1941.

== Research and development ==
During RNII's existence the following were created:

- 1933 – various liquid propellent rocket engines;
- 1938 – military tests of the fundamentally new weapons begun in 1929 (at GDL) – RS-82 and RS-132 rockets were completed;
- 1939 — flight tests of the cruise missile 212 with engine ORM-65;
- 1940 — pilot V. P. Fedorov flew the Rocket aircraft RP-318;
- 1941 – On June 21, orders were signed by Joseph Stalin to begin production of the Katyusha missile launcher, which was 24 hours before Nazi Germany invaded;
- 1942 — test pilot G. Ya. Bakhchivanji makes a flight on the first aircraft in the USSR equipped with ZHRD. The engine was designed by RNII;
- 1943–1944 – a number of experimental ballistic and cruise missiles and engines were developed;
- 1942–1944 – an attempt to create a interceptor missile aircraft 302, however it was never successfully flown and the project was cancelled in 1944.

=== RS-82 and RS-132 rockets ===
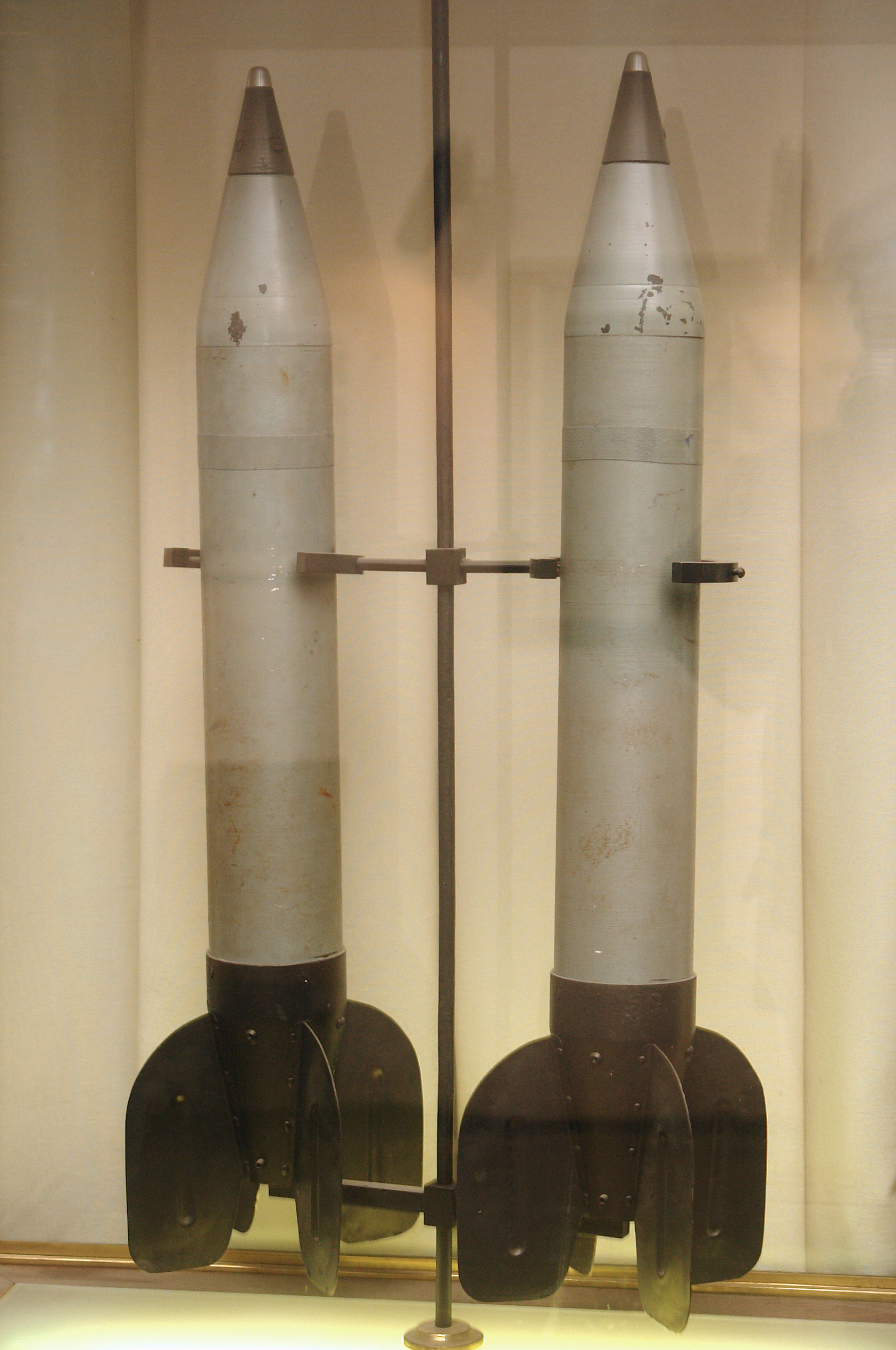
RS-82 rockets at the Museum of Cosmonautics and Rocket Technology; St. Petersburg

Design work on RS-82 and RS-132 rockets (RS for Reaktivnyy Snaryad, 'rocket-projectile') began in the late 1920s at GDL. In 1932 in-air test firings of RS-82 rocket from an Tupolev I-4 aircraft armed with six launchers successfully took place. After September 1933 development was continued by RNII, including designing several variations for ground-to-air, ground-to-ground, air-to-ground and air-to-air combat. The RS-82 rockets were carried by Polikarpov I-15, I-16 and I-153 fighter planes, the Polikarpov R-5 reconnaissance plane and the Ilyushin Il-2 close air support plane, while the heavier RS-132 rockets could be carried by bombers. Many small ships of the Soviet Navy were also fitted with the RS-82 rocket, including the MO-class small guard ship.

The earliest known use by the Soviet Air Force of aircraft-launched unguided anti-aircraft rockets in combat against heavier-than-air aircraft took place in August 1939, during the Battle of Khalkhin Gol. A group of Polikarpov I-16 fighters under command of Captain N. Zvonarev were using RS-82 rockets against Japanese aircraft, shooting down 16 fighters and 3 bombers in total. Six Tupolev SB bombers also used RS-132 for ground attack during the Winter War.

=== Katyusha rockets ===
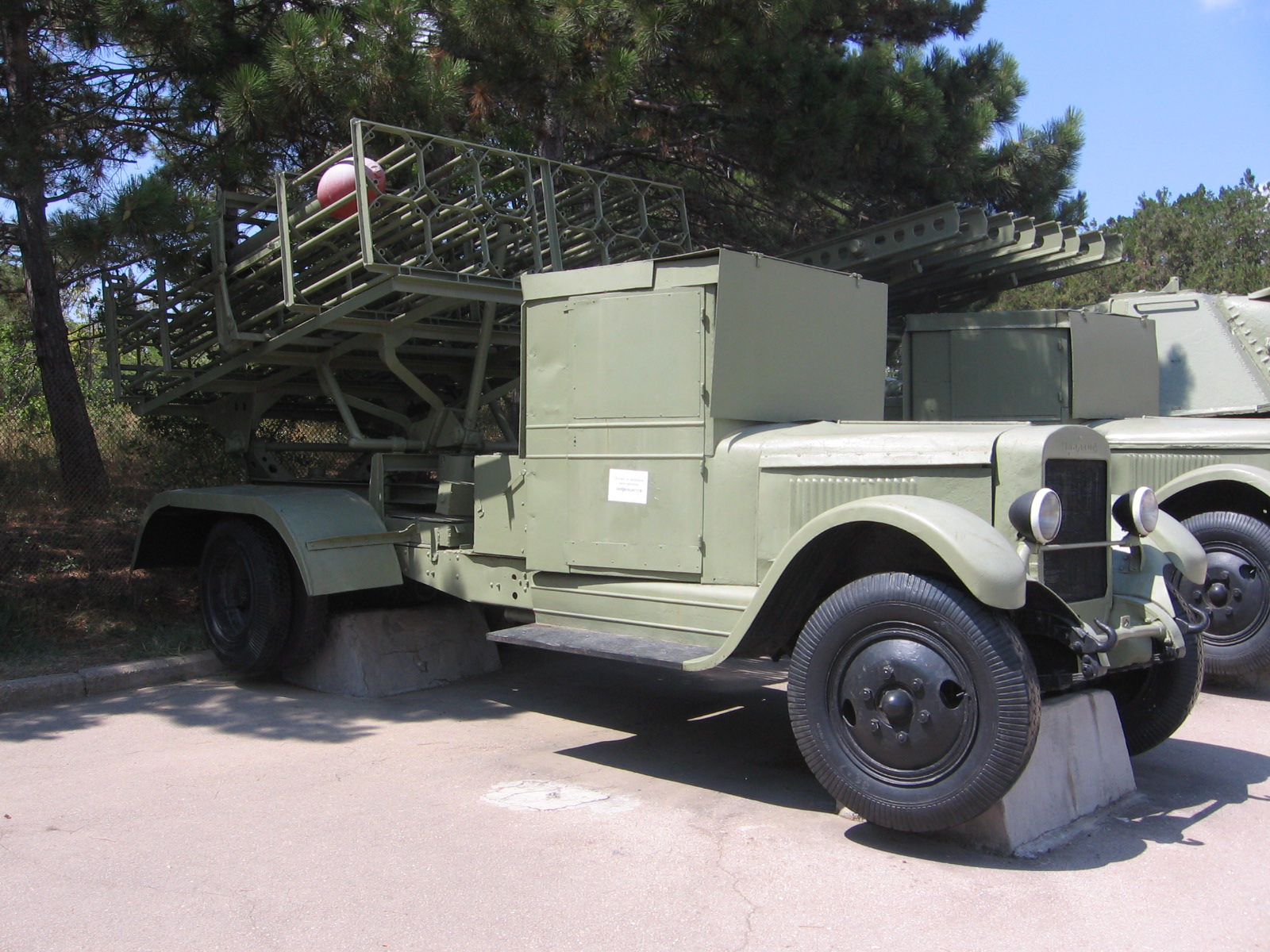
BM-31-12 on ZIS-12 at the Museum (Diorama) on Sapun Mountain, Sevastopol

In June 1938, RNII began developing a multiple rocket launcher based on the RS-132 rocket. Gvay led a team of designers and engineers to build multiple prototype launchers firing the modified 132 mm M-132 rockets over the sides of ZIS-5 trucks. The trucks proved to be unstable, as a solution to this V.N. Galkovskiy proposed mounting the launch rails across the top of the vehicles. In August 1939, the completed rocket was the BM-13 (BM stands for боевая машина (translit. boyevaya mashina), 'combat vehicle' for M-13 rockets).

Towards the end of 1938 the first significant large scale testing of the rocket launchers took place, 233 rockets of various types were used. A salvo of rockets could completely straddle a target at a range of 5,500 metres (3.4 mi). Various rocket tests were conducted through 1940, and the BM-13-16 with launch rails for sixteen rockets was authorized for production. Only forty launchers were built before Germany invaded the Soviet Union in June 1941. By the end of the war 12 million rockets of the RS type were produced for the Soviet armed forces.

=== Liquid propellant rocket engines ===
Development of Liquid propellant rocket engines had previously commenced at both GDL and GIRD. At GDL Valentin Glushko had designed and built a series of ORM (from "Experimental Rocket Motor" in Russian) engines ORM-1 to ORM-52. This research was continued at RNII with engines ОРМ-53 to ОРМ-102 developed, with ORM-65 powering the RP-318 rocket-powered aircraft. In 1938 Leonid Dushkin replaced Glushko and continued development of the ORM engines, including the engine for the rocket powered interceptor, the Bereznyak-Isayev BI-1. At GIRD Mikhail Tikhonravov had built the GIRD-09 rocket, fueled by liquid oxygen and jellied gasoline, which launched on August 17, 1933. At RNII Tikhonravov worked on developing oxygen/alcohol liquid-propellant rocket engines. Ultimately liquid propellant rocket engines were given a low priority during the late 1930s at RNII, however the research was productive and very important for later achievements of the Soviet rocket program.

=== RP-318 rocket-powered aircraft ===
The RP-318 was USSR's first rocket-powered aircraft (Rocketry Planer or Raketoplan) which "RP" stands for in Russian language. Built in 1936 by Sergei Korolev as an adaptation of his SK-9 glider, the RP-318 was originally designed as a flying laboratory to test rocket engines and ORM-65 designed by Valentin Glushko was the one selected to be used. In 1938, when both Korolev and Glushko were arrested in suspicion of Anti-Soviet activity, development of the RP-318-1 was continued by Alexei Scherbakov (Щербаков, Алексей Яковлевич) and Arvid Pallo (Палло, Арвид Владимирович), culminating in the first powered flight on Feb. 28, 1940. Test pilot V. P. Fedorov (Владимир Павлович Фёдоров) was towed to 2,600 m and cast off at 80 km/h before firing the rocket engine and accelerating the aircraft to 140 km/h and an altitude of 2,900 m. In all, the RP-318 flew nine times before World War II ended its development.

== Great Purge ==
During the 1930s Soviet rocket technology was comparable to Germany's, however Joseph Stalin's Great Purge severely damaged its progress. RNII was particularly affected with Director Kleymyonov and Chief Engineer Langemak arrested in November 1937, and later executed. Glushko was arrested in March 1938 and with many other leading engineers was imprisoned in the Gulag. Korolev was arrested in June 1938 and sent to a forced labour camp in Kolyma in June 1939. However, due to the intervention by Andrei Tupolev, he was relocated to a prison for scientist and engineers in September 1940. From 1937 to 1944 no serious work was carried out on long range rockets as weapons, or for space exploration.

== Successors ==
In February 1944, the institute merged with Design Bureau OKB-293, led by Soviet engineer Viktor Bolkhovitinov, which had developed the short-range rocket powered interceptor called Bereznyak-Isayev BI-1. The new organisation was named Scientific-Research Institute 1 (NII-1), and became the responsibility of the People’s Commissariat of Aviation Industry.

In 1965, NII-1 was re-named the Scientific-Research Institute for Thermal Processes (NII TP) and became part of the newly created Ministry of General Machine Building, which was responsible for all issues related to strategic ballistic missiles and space technology in the USSR.

In 1992, NII TP became part of Rosaviakosmos and in 1993 was renamed the Keldysh Research Center.

== Legacy ==
A number of writers have noted the importance of RNII to the future Soviet space program, including Siddiqi:

…it is clear that the work at RNII was not only productive but also extremely important in terms of the later achievements of the Soviet rocketry program. Apart from the purely technological advancements and the mastery of important practical processes, the years at RNII also gave the young engineers their first active involvement in issues of organization and management.

and Chertok:

All of our rocket-space technology historians consider it obligatory to mention the founding role of RNII, the Reactive Scientific-Research Institute, in the origin of domestic cosmonautics.

== Awards and rewards ==
- Order of the Red Star (1942) – for the development of new types of weapons. The developers were awarded the Stalin prize and the head of development A. G. Kostikov was made a Hero of Socialist Labor.
- Other participants in the creation of the famous rocket weapon of the Second World War, the Katyusha rocket launcher, received official recognition only in 1991. By decree of the President of the USSR Mikhail Gorbachev dated 21 June 1991, I. T. Kleymenov, G. E. Langemak, V. N. Luzhin, B. S. Petropavlovsky, B. M. Slonimer and N. I. Tikhomirov were posthumously awarded title of Heroes of Socialist Labor.
- In 1966 the following employees of RNII were assigned crater names on the far side of the Moon for their contribution to rocketry; Sergei Korolev, Aleksandr Fedorov, Georgy Langemak, Vladimir Artemyev.
- In 1962 the names GDL, GIRD and RNII were assigned to crater chains on the far side of the Moon.

== See also ==
- Gas Dynamics Laboratory
- Group for the Study of Reactive Motion
- Keldysh Research Center
- Soviet rocketry
