= Friedrich Zander =

Russian engineer (1887–1933)

- Фридрих Цандер
- Born: 23 August [O.S. 11 August] 1887; Riga, Governorate of Livonia, Russian Empire
- Died: 28 March 1933 (aged 45); Kislovodsk, Russian SFSR, Soviet Union
- Education: Riga Technical University
- Scientific career
- Fields: Astronautics
- Workplaces: Moscow Aviation Institute

Signature
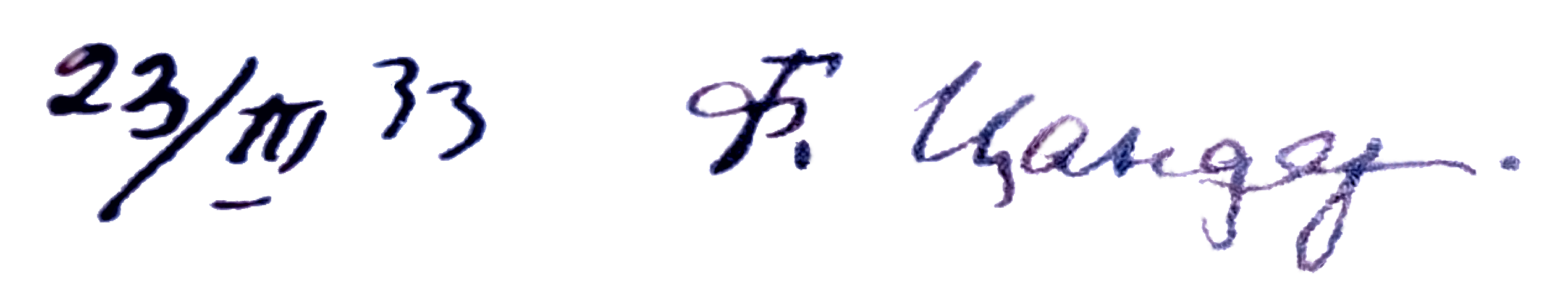

Georg Arthur Constantin Friedrich Zander (also Tsander; Russian: Фри́дрих Арту́рович Ца́ндер, romanized: Fridrikh Arturovich Tsander; Latvian: Frīdrihs Canders; 23 August [O.S. 11 August] 1887 – 28 March 1933) was a Russian and Soviet pioneer of rocketry and spaceflight, of Baltic German descent. He designed the first liquid-fueled rocket to be launched in the Soviet Union, GIRD-X, and made many important theoretical contributions to the road to space.

== Biography ==
Zander was born in Riga, Russian Empire, into a Baltic German commoner family. His father Arthur Georg Zander was a doctor, but Friedrich Zander was fascinated by other natural sciences. Zander was enrolled in the Riga urban technical high school in 1898, for a seven-year program in which he was a top student. During this time, he became acquainted with the work of Konstantin Tsiolkovsky and space travel became his foremost scientific passion. While studying engineering at the Riga Polytechnic Institute, he carried out trajectory calculations for a flight to Mars. Mars held a special fascination for Zander, and "Forward to Mars!" (Вперед, на Марс!) became his famous motto.

He graduated with his engineering degree in 1914, moved to Moscow in 1915. He worked at the "Provodnik" rubber plant, then in 1919 worked at Aircraft Factory No. 4 ("Motor"). In 1923, he was married to A.F. Milyukova, and they had a daughter named Astra and a son named Mercury. Mercury died of scarlet fever in 1929. After several years of unemployment and intensive research on rocketry and space travel, in 1926, Zander began work at the Central Design Bureau of Aviation, and in 1930 worked at the Central Institute of Aviation Motor Construction (TsIAM).

== Scientific contributions ==
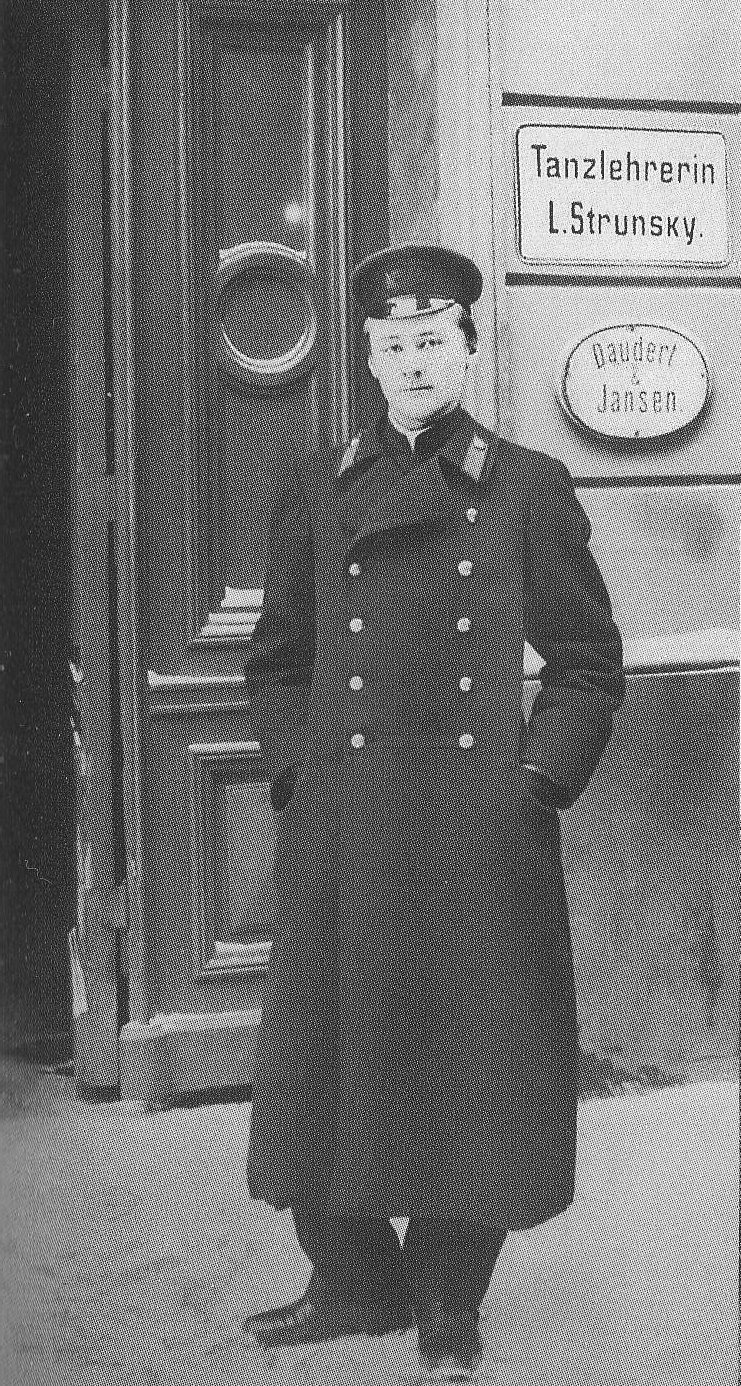
Friedrich Zander

In 1908, he made notes about the problems of interplanetary travel in which he addressed issues such as life support and became the first to suggest growing plants in greenhouses aboard a spacecraft. In 1911, he published plans for a spacecraft built using combustible alloys of aluminum in its structure that would take off like a conventional aircraft and then burn its wings for fuel as it reached the upper atmosphere and no longer needed them. In 1921, he presented his material to the Association of Inventors (AIIZ), where he met and discussed space travel with V.I. Lenin, who was attending the conference. In 1924, he published it in the journal Tekhnika i Zhizn ("Technology and Life").

1924 was a particularly active year for Zander. The year before, Hermann Oberth had published the influential theoretical work "Die Rakete zu den Planetenräumen" ("The rocket to interplanetary space"), which in turn introduced Zander and other Russian enthusiasts to the ground breaking work by Robert Goddard ("A Method of Reaching Extreme Altitudes" published in 1919). Zander took advantage of this by promoting Tsiolkovsky's work, and developing it further. Together with Vladimir Vetchinkin and members of a rocketry club at the airforce academy, he founded the Society for Studies of Interplanetary Travel. In an early publication, they would be the first to suggest using the Earth's atmosphere as a way of braking a re-entering spacecraft. The same year, Zander lodged a patent in Moscow for a winged rocket that he believed would be suitable for interplanetary flight, and in late 1924 and early 1925, he gave lectures in Moscow and other Russian cities on the possibility of interplanetary travel.

Around this time, Zander became the first to suggest the solar sail as a means of spacecraft propulsion, although Johannes Kepler had suggested a solar wind sail in the 17th century.

In 1925, Zander presented a paper, "Problems of flight by jet propulsion: interplanetary flights," in which he suggested that a spacecraft traveling between two planets could be accelerated at the beginning of its trajectory and decelerated at the end of its trajectory by using the gravity of the two planets' moons — a method known as gravity assist. Zander showed his deep understanding of the physics behind the concept and he foresaw the advantage it could play for interplanetary travels, with a vision far ahead of his contemporaries.

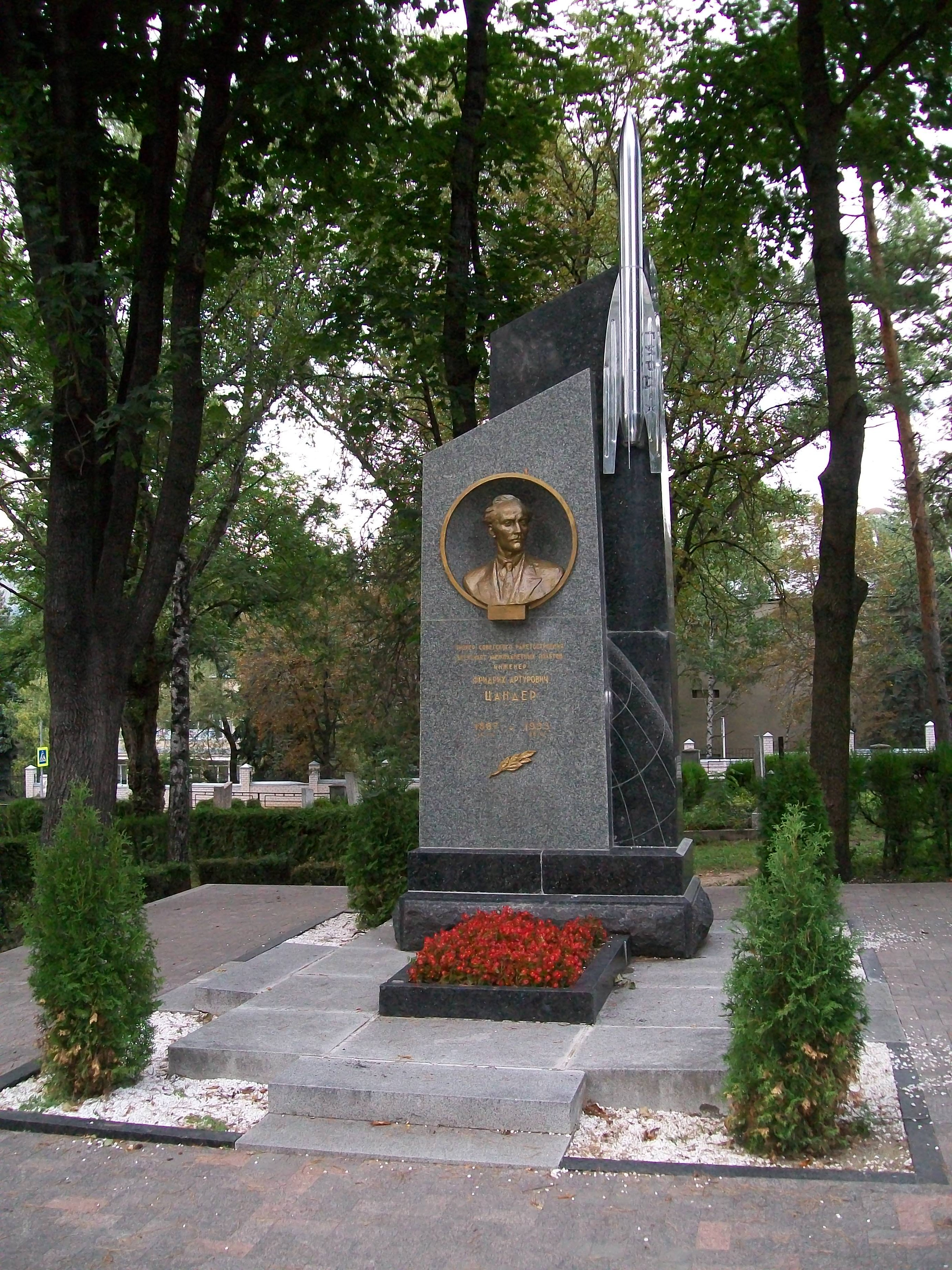
The grave of Friedrich Zander in Kislovodsk, Stavropol Krai, Russia.

In 1929–1930, while at the IAM, Zander worked on his first engine, OR-1, which ran on compressed air and gasoline and was based on a modified blowtorch. He also taught courses at the Moscow Aviation Institute during this time. In 1931, Zander was a founding member of GIRD (Group for the Study of Reactive Motion) in Moscow. As head of brigade no. 1, Zander worked on the OR-2 (GIRD-02) rocket engine, to power the "216" winged cruise missile. He also worked on the engine and rocket GIRD-10, which flew successfully on 25 November 1933. Zander had designed the rocket, but did not live to see it fly, having died of typhus in March of that year in the city of Kislovodsk.

== Tributes ==
- The crater Tsander on the Moon is named after him.
- The Latvian Academy of Sciences awards a physics and mathematics prize in his honour.
- Starting 1992, the Russian Academy of Sciences awards the Tsander Prize, the highest scientific award of the Russian Academy of Sciences for "outstanding theoretical work in the field of rocket and space science".
- Zander is featured on stamps of Soviet Union (1964), Latvia (2012) and Russia (2012)
- Zander's family home in Riga was a museum (until the recent change in its ownership), and the street it is located on is named after him.
- Мonument installed near the family home in Riga
- Streets named after Zander are also in Moscow and in Kislovodsk.

== See also ==
- List of Baltic German scientists

== Bibliography ==
- Цандер, Фридрих Артурович (1967). Из научного наследия (in Russian). Moscow: Nauka.
  - Technical translation by NASA: Tsander, Fridrikh Arturovich (1969). From a scientific heritage. Washington D.C.: NASA.
- Tsander, Fridrikh Arturovich (1977). Selected Papers (in Russian). Riga: Zinātne.
- Golovanov, Yaroslav (1985). The Martian:Tsander (in Russian). Moscow: Molodaya Gvardiya. Archived from the original on 2011-05-27.
- Georgiy Stepanovich Vetrov, S. P. Korolyov and space. First steps. — 1994 M. Nauka, ISBN 5-02-000214-3.
- Д.Я. Зильманович «Пионер советского ракетостроения Ф.А.Цандер», М., 1966. – 196 с.
