= Gas Dynamics Laboratory =

Soviet rocket laboratory 1921 to 1933

Gas Dynamics Laboratory "GDL"
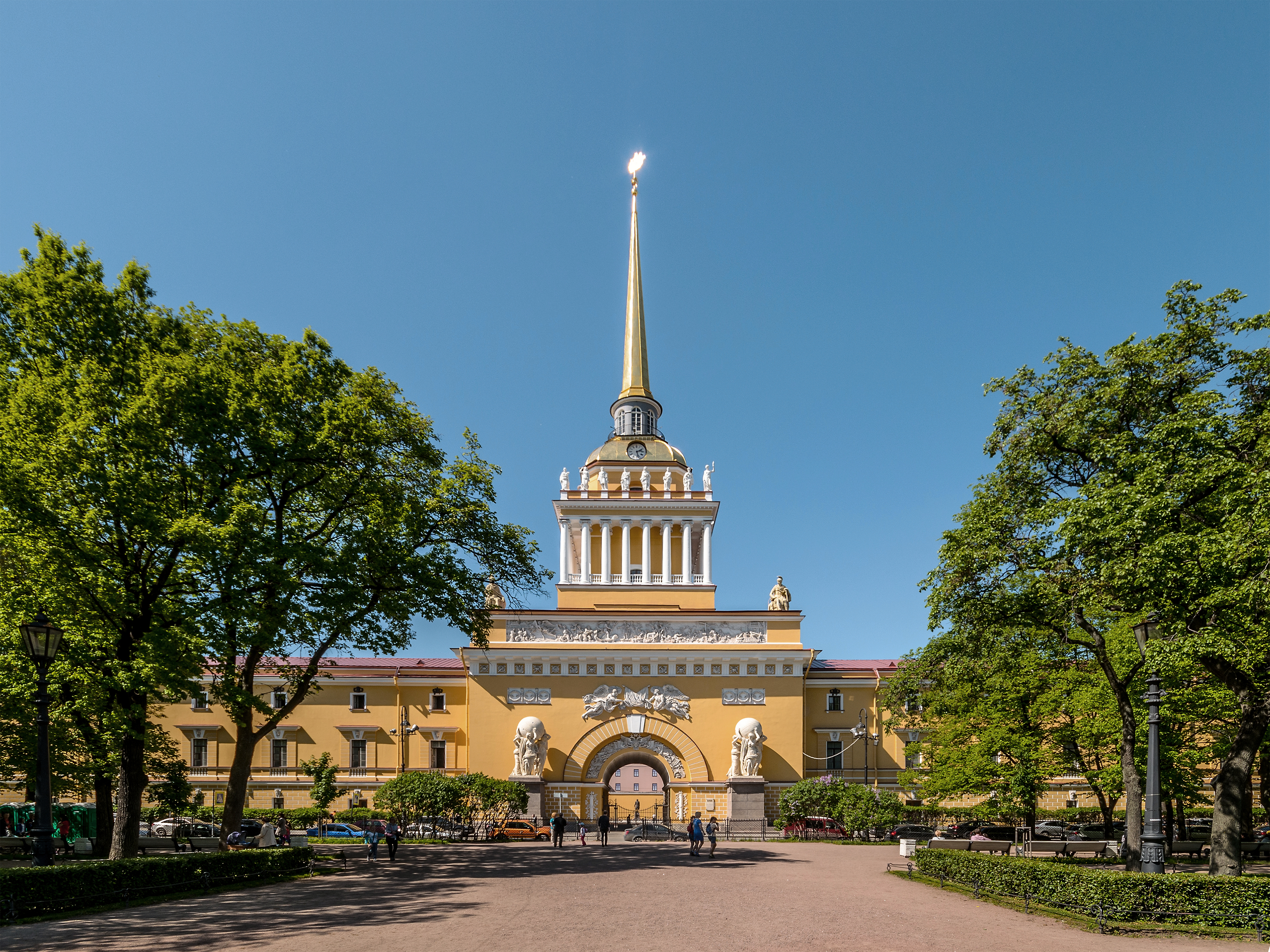
- The building of the Main Admiralty in Leningrad, where in the 1930s the Gas Dynamics Laboratory was located
- Parent institution: Revolutionary Military Council of the USSR
- Founder: Nikolai Tikhomirov
- Established: 1921
- Mission: research and development
- Focus: Solid-propellant rockets, Liquid-propellant rockets
- Key people: Valentin Glushko
- Location: USSR, Moscow and Leningrad
- Dissolved: in 1933 became RNII

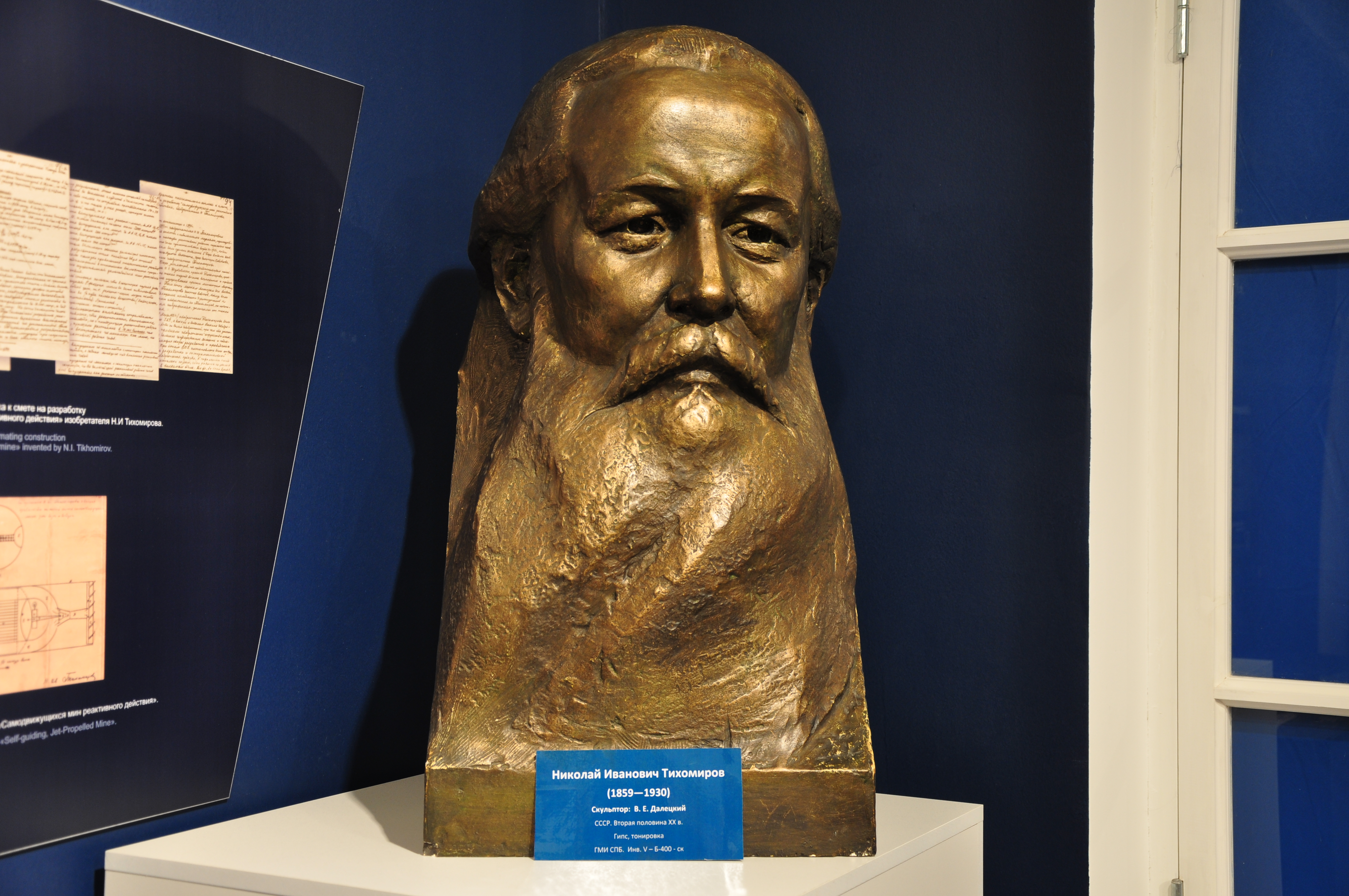
Nikolai Tikhomirov, creator of GDL

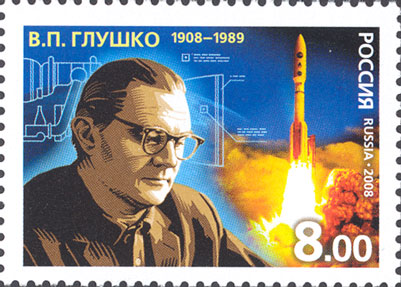
Valentin Glushko

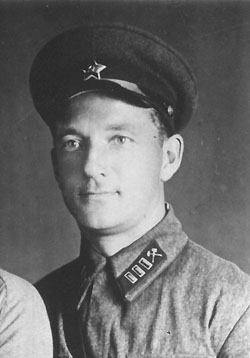
Georgy Langemak

Gas Dynamics Laboratory (GDL) (Russian: Газодинамическая лаборатория) was the first Soviet research and development laboratory to focus on rocket technology. Its activities were initially devoted to the development of solid propellant rockets, which became the prototypes of missiles in the Katyusha rocket launcher, as well as liquid propellant rockets, which became the prototypes of Soviet rockets and spacecraft. At the end of 1933 it became part of the Reactive Scientific Research Institute (RNII). A number of craters on the far side of the Moon are named after GDL employees.

== History of the organization ==
- First rocket research and development organization in the USSR.
- Created on 1 March 1921 in Moscow as the "Laboratory for the development of inventions by N. I. Tikhomirov" as part of the Main Artillery Directorate of the Red Army.
- In 1928 the laboratory was relocated to Leningrad.
- In July 1928, was renamed the Gas Dynamics Laboratory (GDL) of the Military Scientific Committee under the Revolutionary Military Council of the USSR.
- by early 1933 approximately 200 personnel were working for GDL.
- At the end of 1933 GDL merged with the Group for the Study of Reactive Motion (GIRD) to become the Reactive Scientific Research Institute (RNII).

== GDL Managers ==
Nikolai Tikhomirov (1921—1930);

Boris Sergeevich Petropavlovsky (1930-1931);

Nikolai Yakovlevich Ilyin (rocket scientist) (1931—1932);

Ivan Kleymyonov (12.1932 - 9.1933, then head of the RNII).

== Solid propellant rockets ==
The GDL utilised smokeless (TNT) gunpowder on a non-volatile solvent for solid propellant rockets. The first test-firing of a solid fuel rocket was carried out in March 1928, which flew for about 1,300 meters In 1931 the world's first successful use of rockets to assist take-off of aircraft were carried out on a U-1, the Soviet designation for an Avro 504 trainer, which achieved about one hundred successful assisted takeoffs. Successful assisted takeoffs were also achieved on the Tupolev TB-1 (Russian 'ТБ-1') and Tupolev TB-3 aircraft. Further developments in the early 1930s were led by Georgy Langemak, including firing rockets from aircraft and the ground. In 1932 in-air test firings of RS-82 missiles from a Tupolev I-4 aircraft armed with six launchers successfully took place. RNII then modified these rockets for the famous Katyusha rocket launcher, which were used during World War II. In these works, the main design contribution was made by GDL employees Nikolai Tikhomirov, Vladimir Artemyev, Boris Petropavlovsky, Georgy Langemak, Ivan Isidorovich and others.

== Electric & liquid fuel rocket engines ==
On 15 May 1929 a section was created to develop electric rocket engines, headed by 23 year old Valentin Glushko, Glushko proposed to use energy in electric explosion of metals to create rocket propulsion. In the early 1930s the world's first example of an electrothermal rocket engine was created. This early work by GDL has been steadily carried on and electric rocket engines were used in the 1960s onboard the Voskhod 1 spacecraft and Zond-2 Venus probe.

In 1931 Glushko was redirected to work on liquid propellant rocket engines. This resulted in the creation of ORM (from "Experimental Rocket Motor" in Russian) engines ORM-1 to ORM-52. To increase the resource, various technical solutions were used: the jet nozzle had a spirally finned wall and was cooled by fuel components, curtain cooling was used for the combustion chamber and ceramic thermal insulation of the combustion chamber using zirconium dioxide. Nitric acid, solutions of nitric acid with nitrogen tetroxide, tetranitromethane, hypochloric acid and hydrogen peroxide were first proposed as an oxidizing agent. As a result of experiments, by the end of 1933, a high-boiling fuel from kerosene and nitric acid was selected as the most convenient in operation and industrial production. In 1931 self-igniting combustible and chemical ignition of fuel with gimbal engine suspension were proposed. For fuel supply in 1931-1932 fuel pumps operating from combustion chamber gases were developed. In 1933 a centrifugal turbopump unit for a rocket engine with a thrust of 3000 N was developed. A total of 100 bench tests of liquid-propellant rockets were conducted using various types of fuel, both low and high-boiling and thrust up to 300 kg was achieved.

Experimental liquid propellant rockets were constructed, the first two rockets with a planned lifting height of 2–4 km were manufactured and testing was continued by RNII.

The work on the creation of engines under the leadership of Glushko was carried out by employees of the ERD and liquid-propellant engine section, including the active involvement of A. L. Maly, V. I. Serov, E. N. Kuzmin, I. I. Kulagin, E. S. Petrov, P. I. Minaev, B. A. Kutkin, V. P. Yukov, Nikolai Chernyshev and others.

== Location of the laboratory in Leningrad in the 1930s ==
- In the Admiralty building.
- In the building Peter and Paul Fortress there are stands for testing ERD and liquid-propellant engines.

== Lunar craters named after GDL employees ==
In 1966, the Commission of the USSR Academy of Sciences on Lunar Names assigned craters on the far side of the Moon names in honor of the following workers of the GDL; Nikolai Tikhomirov, N. P. Alyokhina, Vladimir Artemyev, Artamonova, A. I. Gavrilova, A. D. Gracheva, Zhiritsky, A. L. Maly, Y. B. Mezentseva, E. S. Petropavlovsky, B.S. Petrova, G. F. Firsova, N. G. Chernysheva. In 1962 the names GDL, GIRD and RNII were assigned to crater chains on the far side of the Moon.

== Museum of Cosmonautics and Rocket Technology named after V. P. Glushko ==
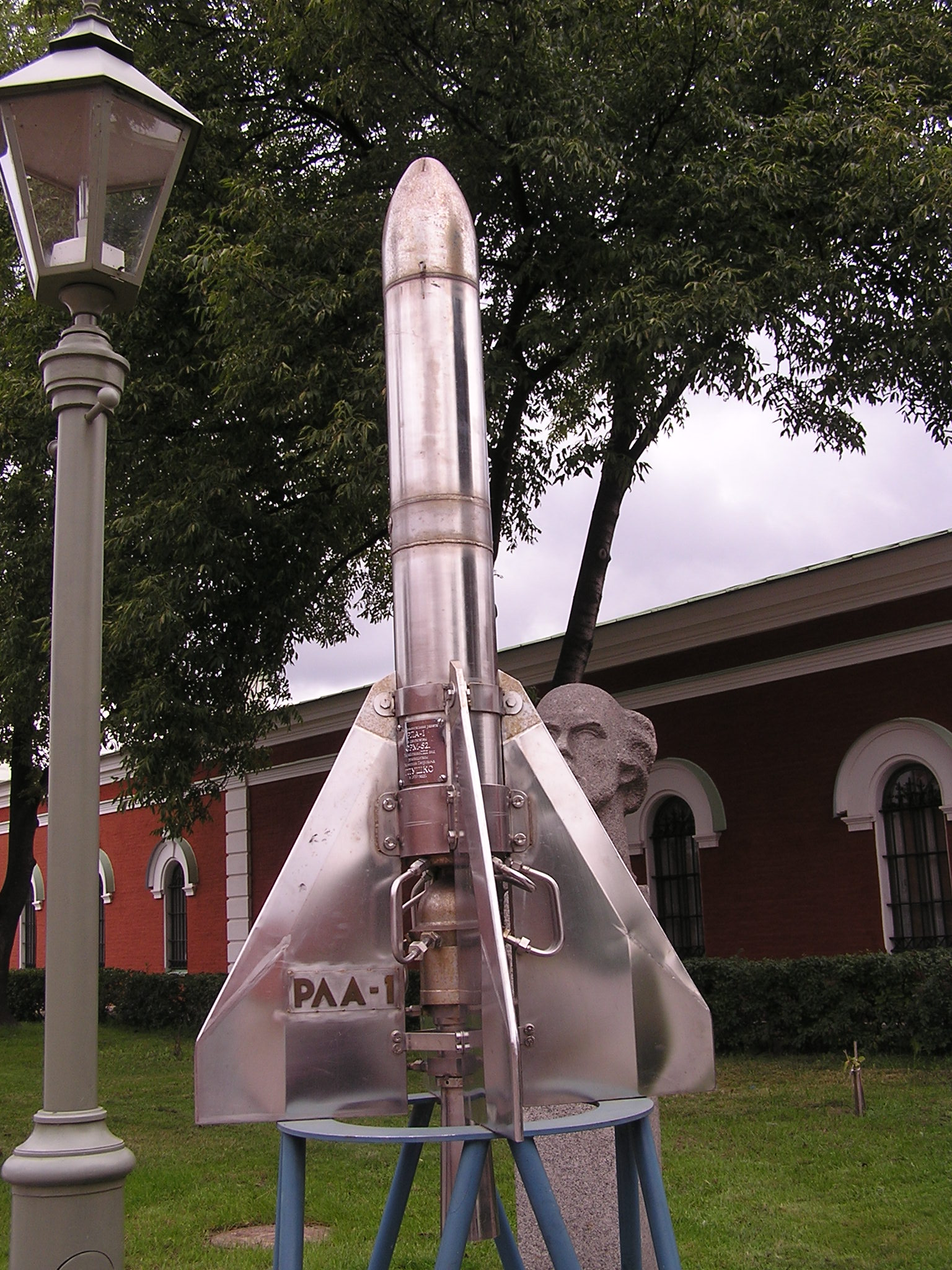
RLA-1 rocket in the Museum of Cosmonautics and Rocketry (in the Peter and Paul Fortress)

The V. P. Glushko Museum of Cosmonautics and Rocket Technology is a memorial museum telling about the beginning of the domestic space engine industry, including the history of GDL. The museum is located in the Peter and Paul Fortress, which in the 1930s housed GDL stands for testing rocket engines. It was opened on April 12, 1973.

== See also ==
- Group for the Study of Reactive Motion
- Reactive Scientific Research Institute
