= Group for the Study of Reactive Motion =

Early Soviet rocket research bureau

Coordinates: 55.7692°N 37.6461°E

Group for the Study of Reactive Motion "GIRD"
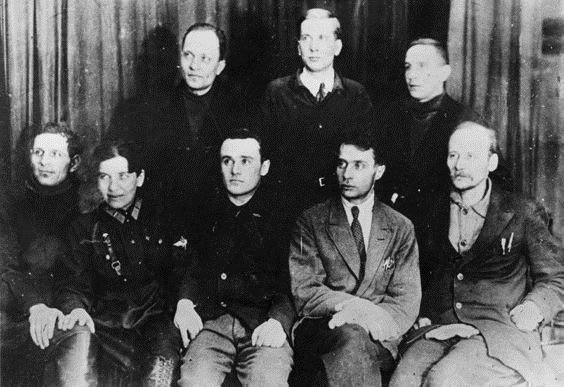
- Members of the Group for the Study of Reactive Motion. 1931. Left to right: standing I.P. Fortikov, Yu A Pobedonostsev, Zabotin; sitting: A. Levitsky, Nadezhda Sumarokova, Sergei Korolev, Boris Cheranovsky, Friedrich Zander
- Parent institution: Osoaviakhim
- Founder: Fredrich Tsander
- Established: 1931
- Mission: research and development
- Focus: Liquid-propellant rockets
- Key people: Sergey Korolev
- Location: Moscow, Leningrad and other locations
- Dissolved: in 1933 became RNII

The Moscow-based Group for the Study of Reactive Motion (also known as the Group for the Investigation of Reactive Engines and Reactive Flight or Jet Propulsion Study Group; Russian: Группа изучения реактивного движения, Gruppa izucheniya reaktivnogo dvizheniya), abbreviated as GIRD (ГИРД), was a Soviet research bureau founded in 1931 to study various aspects of rocketry. GIRD launched the first Soviet liquid propellant rocket in August 1933. In November 1933 it was incorporated into the Reactive Scientific Research Institute (Реактивный научно-исследовательский институт, Reaktivnyy nauchno-issledovatel’skiy institut, РНИИ, RNII).

== History ==
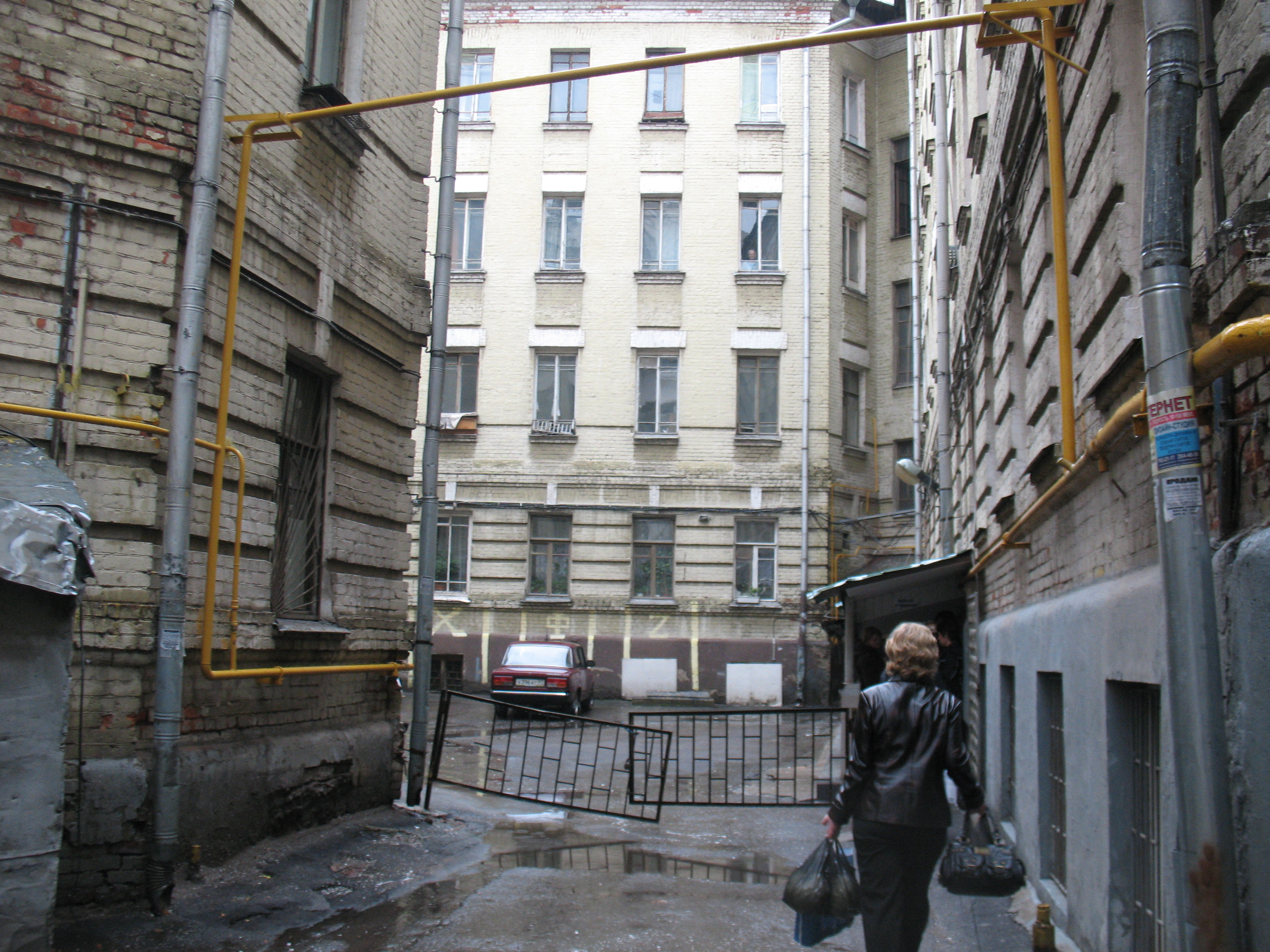
Building in Moscow where in basement was first location of GIRD

The inspiration for establishing the organisation came from Fredrich Tsander, a scientist, inventor, and romantic who dreamed of space travel. Tsander had begun to consider rocket-powered interplanetary flight as early as 1907 and was one of the founding members of the Society for the Study of Interplanetary Communication in 1924. In September 1931 Tsander formed the Moscow-based 'Group for the Study of Reactive Motion', better known by its Russian acronym “GIRD”. Initial funding was provided by Osoaviakhim however it was insufficient to cover production costs. In April 1932 Tsander began working full time for GIRD, however most other personnel worked at night or in their spare time. The personnel jokingly referred to GIRD as “Gruppa inzhenerov, rabotayushchaya darom” (group of engineers working for nothing).

Local GIRDs also developed in other cities, particularly Leningrad, but also in Kharkiv, Baku, Tiflis, Arkhangelsk, Novocherkassk and Bryansk.

A key contributor to GIRD came from a young aircraft engineer Sergey Korolev, who would later become the de facto head of the Soviet space programme. In 1930 while working as a lead engineer on the Tupolev TB-3 heavy bomber he became interested in the possibilities of liquid-fueled rocket engines to propel airplanes. This led to contact with Tsander, and sparked his interest in space exploration and rocketry.

In May 1932, Sergey Korolev replaced the ailing Tsander as the head of GIRD. At this time the group was organized as four brigades to further optimise their efforts, as follows:

- 1st brigade: Head Tsander (rocket engines).
- 2nd brigade: head Mikhail Tikhonravov (rockets / missiles).
- 3rd brigade: head Yuriy Pobedonostsev (direct-precision air-jet engines and gas-dynamic test units).
- 4th brigade: head Korolev (rocket planes and cruise missiles).

Under Korolev's leadership GIRD began to attract additional funding from the Red Army's Directorate of Military Inventions, which enabled GIRD to obtain better equipment and pay personnel, which by 1933 totaled approximately 60 personnel.

Tsander died unexpectedly from an illness on March 28, 1933, and his engineer, Leonid Konstantinovich Korneev, became the new leader of his Brigade. An exact copy of the GIRD-X can be found on Tsander's headstone in Kislovodsk.

=== OR-1 and OR-2 engines ===
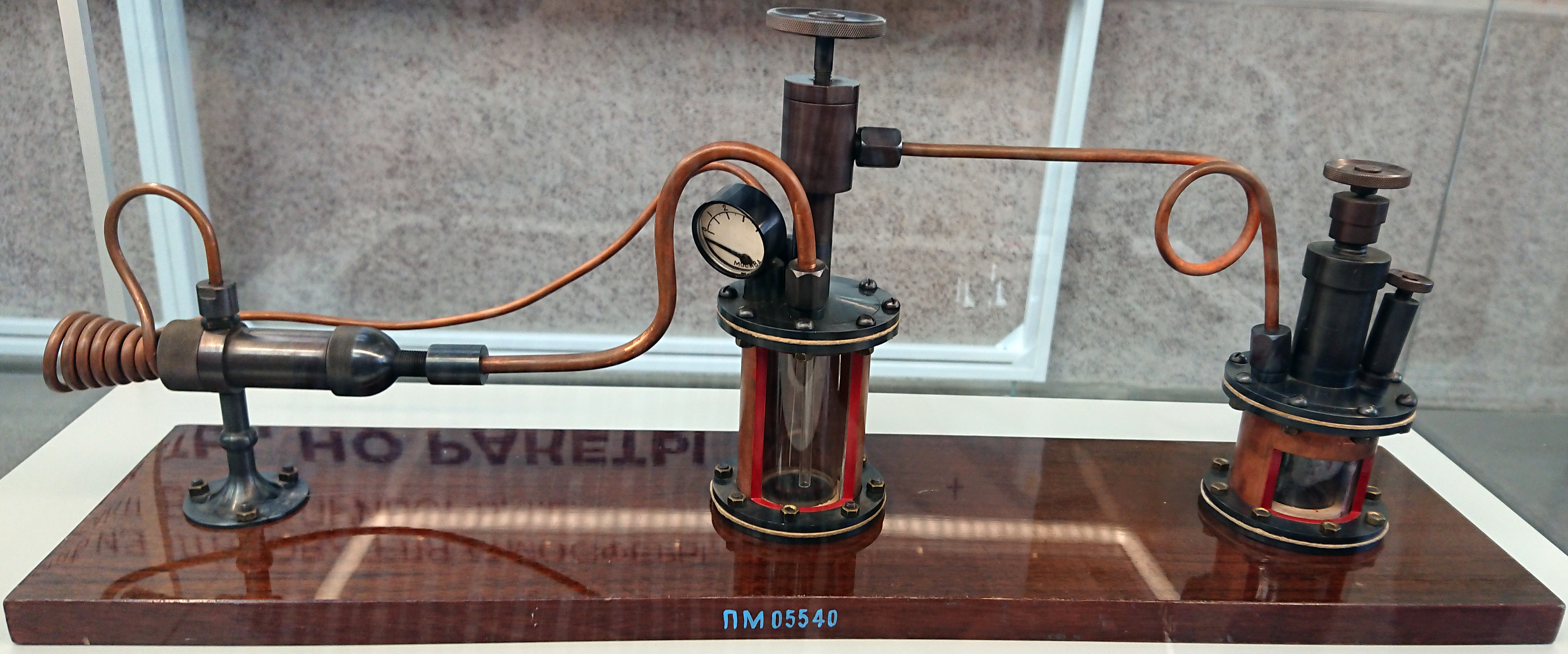
Demonstration installation of jet engine, 1933.

Tsander had begun work on the OR-1 experimental engine in 1929 while working at the Central Institute for Aircraft Motor Construction; this subsequently became GIRD Project 01. It ran on compressed air and gasoline and Tsander used it to investigate high-energy fuels including powdered metals mixed with gasoline. The chamber was cooled regeneratively by air entering at the nozzle end and also by water circulating through a coil.

Project 02, the OR-2 engine, was designed for Korolev's RP-1 rocket-powered glider. It burned oxygen and gasoline, and its nozzle was made from heat-resistant graphite. The engine was later modified to burn alcohol, which generated less heat than gasoline, and its thrust was increased. After cooling the engine walls, the compressed oxygen entered the top end of the chamber in a swirling pattern. Fuel was injected through an atomizer at the center, to create efficient mixing and combustion.

=== GIRD-9 rocket ===
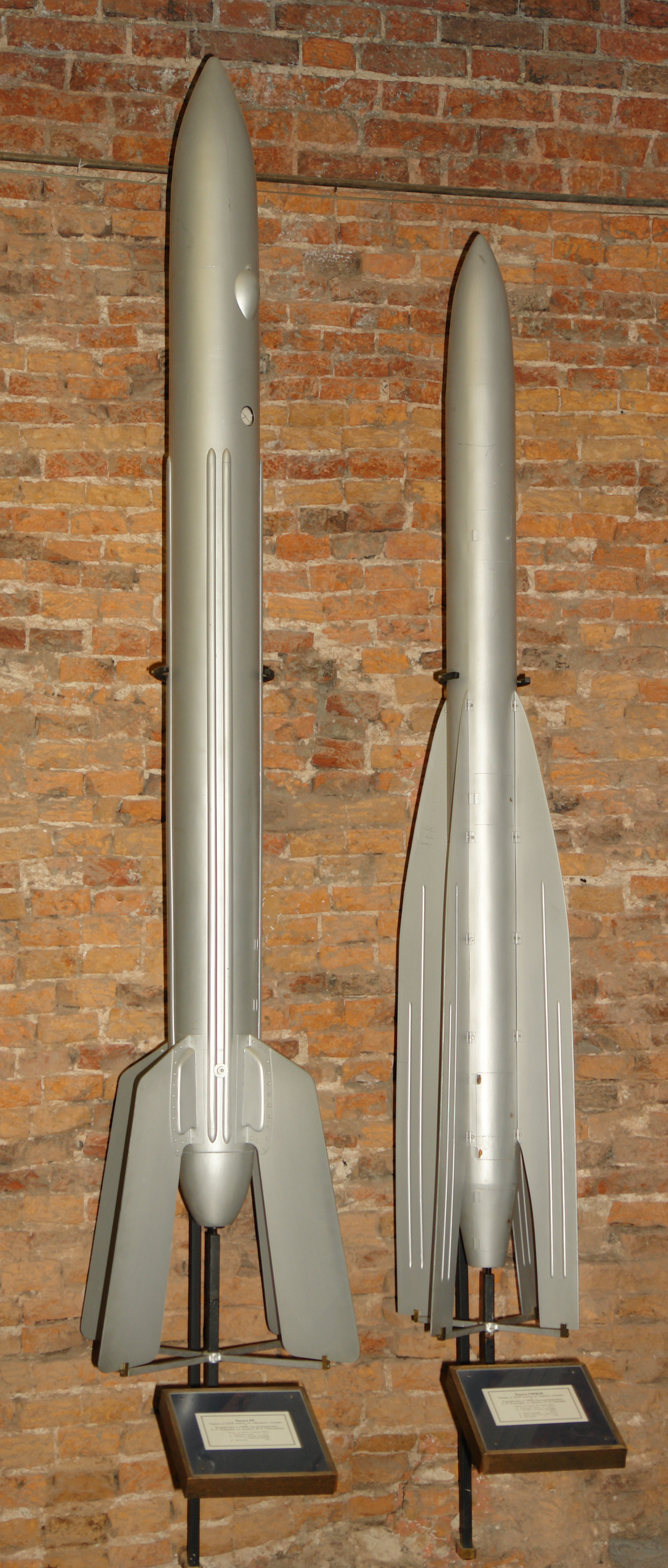
Rocket 09 (left) and 10 (GIRD-09 and GIRD-X). Museum of Cosmonautics and Rocket Technology; St. Petersburg.

Mikhail Klavdievich Tikhonravov, who would later supervise the design of Sputnik I and the Luna programme, headed GIRD's 2nd Brigade, was responsible for the first Hybrid-propellant rocket launch, the GIRD-9, on 17 August 1933, which reached an altitude of 400 metres (1,300 ft).

=== GIRD-X rocket ===
In January 1933 Tsander began development of the GIRD-X rocket (Note: "X" is the Roman numeral 10). It was originally to use a metallic propellant, but after various metals had been tested without success it was designed without a metallic propellant, and was powered by the Project 10 engine which was first bench tested in March 1933. This design burned liquid oxygen and gasoline and was one of the first engines to be regeneratively cooled by the liquid oxygen, which flowed around the inner wall of the combustion chamber before entering it. Problems with burn-through during testing prompted a switch from gasoline to less energetic alcohol. The final missile, 2.2 metres (7.2 ft) long by 140 millimetres (5.5 in) in diameter, had a mass of 30 kilograms (66 lb), and it was anticipated that it could carry a 2 kilograms (4.4 lb) payload to an altitude of 5.5 kilometres (3.4 mi). The GIRD X rocket was launched on 25 November 1933 and flew to a height of 80 meters.

=== Project 05 ===
Tikhonravov was also responsible for the Project 05 rocket in a joint effort with the Gas Dynamics Lab (GDL) in Leningrad. Project 05 used the ORM-50 engine developed by Valentin Glushko, which was fuelled by nitric acid and kerosene with its nozzle regeneratively cooled by the flow of acid. First tested in November 1933, the ORM-50 predated Eugen Sänger's regeneratively cooled engine, which was not tested in Austria until May 1934. The 05 rocket contained four long tanks, enclosed in a body with a four-lobed cross section. It was never completed, but its design formed the basis of the later Aviavnito rocket, powered by Leonid Dushkin's 12-K engine and fueled by liquid oxygen and alcohol, which was first launched in 1936 and achieved an altitude of 3,000 m (9,800 ft) in 1937.

== RNII ==
By 1931 there were two Soviet organisations focusing on rocket technology; GIRD and the Leningrad based Gas Dynamics Laboratory (GDL). Informal contact between the two group were maintained and discussions began of a merger, which was supported by the Deputy People's Commissar for the Army and Navy, Marshall Mikhail Tukhachevsky. This resulted in a memorandum to the effect that GIRD and GDL should be combined, and the result was the Reactive Scientific Research Institute (RNII), founded on 21 September 1933.

== Lunar craters named after GIRD personnel ==
For their contribution to spaceflight the following GIRD personnel have craters on the far side of the Moon named after them; S. P. Korolev, F. A. Tsander and Mikhail Tikhonravov. In 1962 the names GDL, GIRD and RNII were assigned to crater chains on the far side of the Moon.

== See also ==
- Gas Dynamics Laboratory

== Sources cited ==
- Baker, David; Zak, Anatoly (9 September 2013). Race for Space 1: Dawn of the Space Age. RHK.
- Chertok, Boris (2005). Rockets and People Volumes 1-4. National Aeronautics and Space Administration.
- Siddiqi, Asif (2000). Challenge to Apollo : the Soviet Union and the space race, 1945-1974 (PDF). Washington, D.C.: National Aeronautics and Space Administration, NASA History Div.
