= Thomson (crater) =

Crater on the Moon

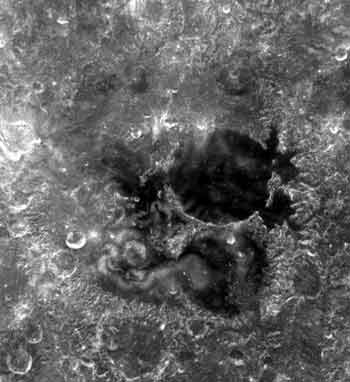
- Mare Ingenii, dominated by the crater Thomson
- Coordinates: 32.7°S 166.2°E
- Diameter: 117 km
- Depth: Unknown
- Colongitude: 195° at sunrise
- Eponym: J. J. Thomson

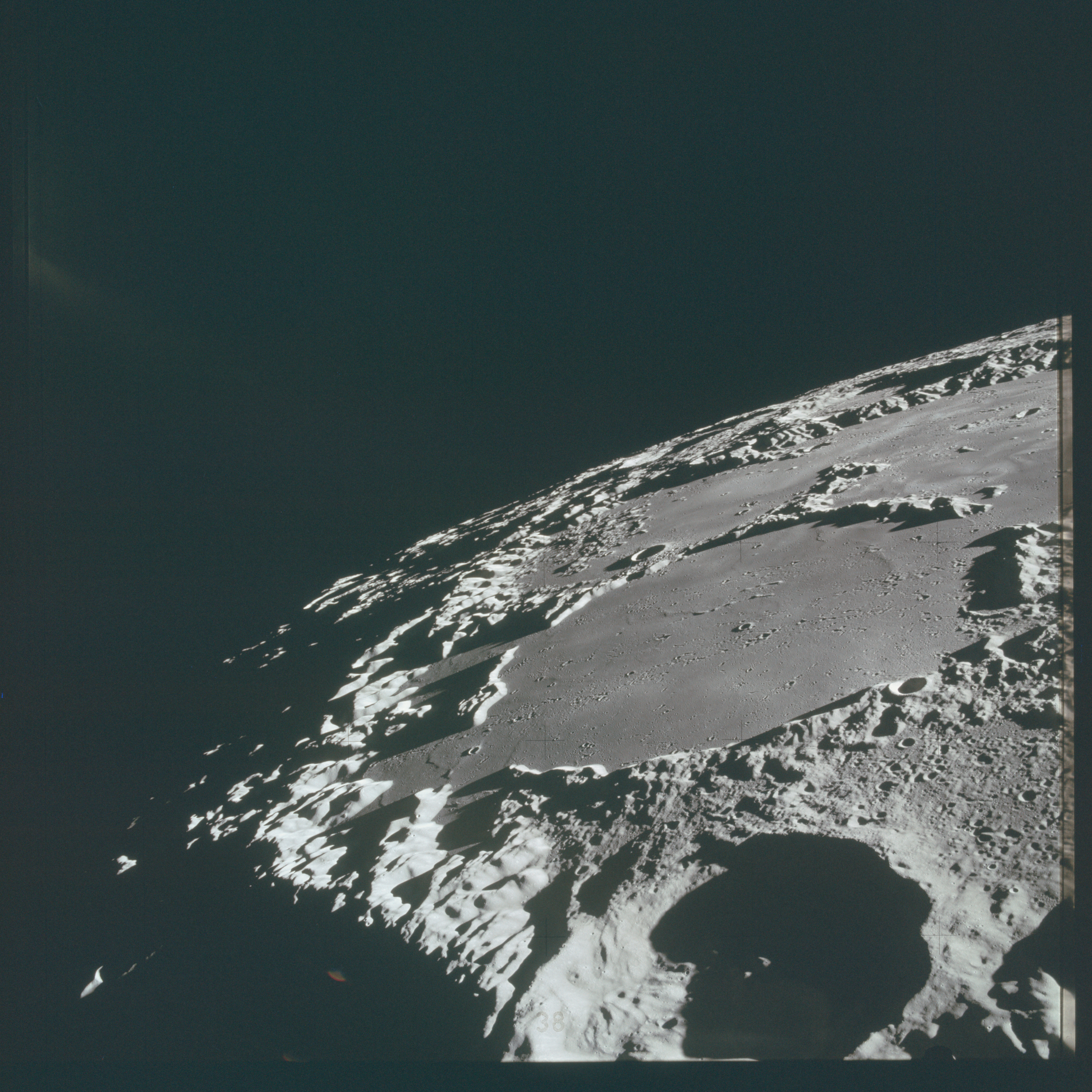
Oblique view of Thomson from Apollo 15

Thomson is a lunar impact crater that is located within the Mare Ingenii on the far side of the Moon. Just to the northeast is the unusual merged crater formation of Van de Graaff. On the northwest rim of the mare is O'Day, and to the south-southwest is Obruchev on the southern shore of Mare Ingenii.

In the past the crater was flooded by lava, leaving only the outer rim intact. There are gaps in the eastern and western rims, leaving two "half-moon" mountainous formations facing each other across the relatively flat floor. There is a similar lava-flooded crater remnant attached to the southern rim of Thomson. The floor of Thomson has a number of secondary impacts that form short, linear streaks across the surface. The infrared spectrum of pure crystalline plagioclase has been identified on the northwest rim.

== Satellite craters ==
By convention these features are identified on lunar maps by placing the letter on the side of the crater midpoint that is closest to Thomson.

Thomson	Latitude	Longitude	Diameter
J	35.9° S	169.6° E	44 km
M	35.7° S	166.0° E	119 km
V	30.7° S	162.2° E	13 km
W	30.2° S	163.3° E	17 km
