= Obruchev (crater) =

Crater on the Moon

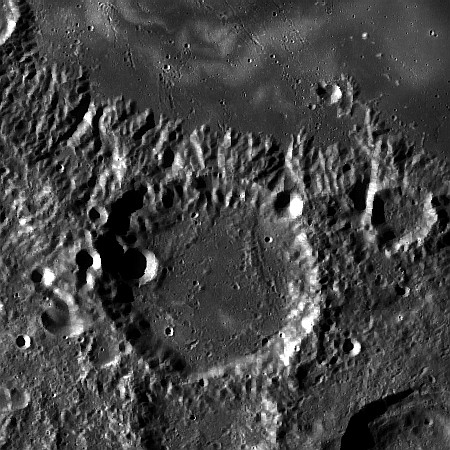
- LRO image
- Coordinates: 38.9°S 162.1°E
- Diameter: 71 km
- Depth: Unknown
- Colongitude: 198° at sunrise
- Eponym: Vladimir A. Obruchev

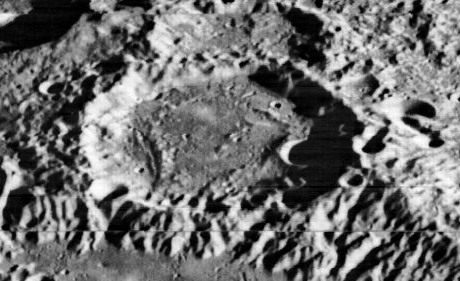
Oblique Lunar Orbiter 2 view, facing south

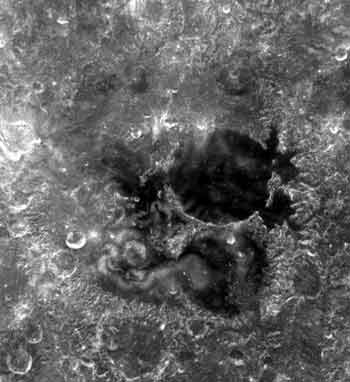
Mare Ingenii, with Obruchev to the south (bottom center)

Obruchev is a disintegrating lunar impact crater that lies along the southern shore of Mare Ingenii, on the far side of the Moon. Less than three crater diameters to the south of Obruchev is the crater Chrétien, and about the same distance to the southeast lies Oresme.

The outer rim of this crater has been heavily damaged and now forms an irregular, rugged ring about the interior. The crater partly overlies the satellite crater Obruchev M to the south, and there is a pair of smaller craters along the western rim and inner wall. The interior of Obruchev has some uneven edges, but it is relatively level and featureless nearer the center.

Prior to formal naming in 1970 by the IAU, the crater was known as Crater 426.

== Satellite craters ==
By convention these features are identified on lunar maps by placing the letter on the side of the crater midpoint that is closest to Obruchev.

Obruchev	Latitude	Longitude	Diameter
M	40.5° S	162.2° E	46 km
T	38.5° S	157.7° E	21 km
V	36.6° S	158.3° E	39 km
X	34.7° S	159.5° E	18 km
