= Mare Ingenii =

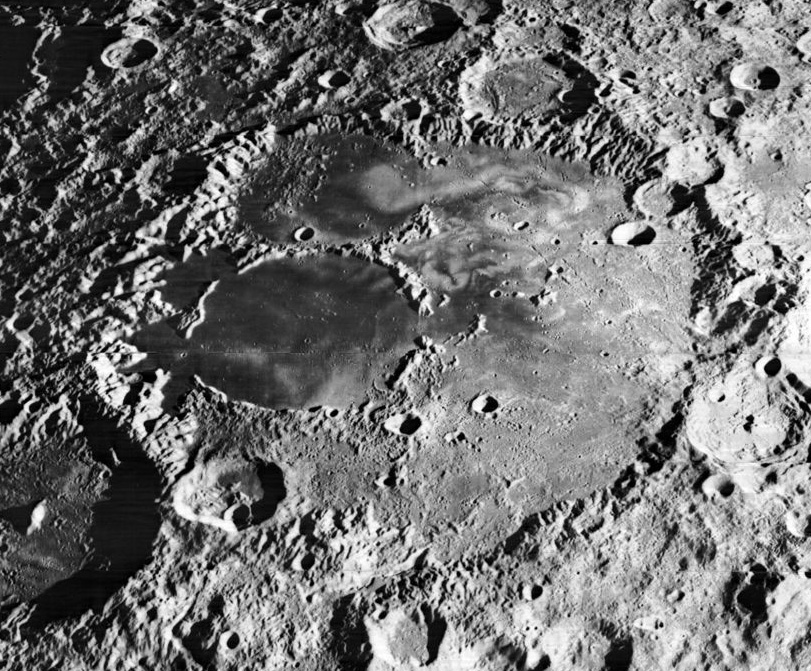
- Oblique Lunar Orbiter 2 image (south at top)
- Coordinates: 33.7°S 163.5°E
- Diameter: 282 km
- Formation: Pre-Nectarian
- Eponym: Sea of Ingenuity

Mare Ingenii /ɪnˈdʒiːniaɪ/ (Latin ingeniī, the "Sea of Cleverness") is one of the few lunar mare features on the far side of the Moon. The mare sits in the Ingenii basin, which is of the Pre-Nectarian epoch, which lies in turn in the outer part of the older and much larger South Pole–Aitken basin. The mare material located in Ingenii and the surrounding craters is of the Upper Imbrian epoch. The dark circular feature which dominates this mare is the crater Thomson (112 km diameter), with the overflow from Ingenii/Thomson directly to the east. Mare Ingenii is incompletely and thinly covered over much of its expanse with mare lava sheets. The light grey crater to the south of Mare Ingenii is Obruchev.

The mare has swirling patterns of bright material, similar to Reiner Gamma and to patterns within Mare Marginis, which are not associated with topographic or volcanic features. The lunar swirls are believed to be associated with magnetic fields.

Prior to formal naming in 1961 by the IAU, the crater was known as Basin XIV.

Mare Ingenii is located at the antipode of the Mare Imbrium impact basin. The furrowed crater walls of the basin (and possibly those of Van de Graaff crater) may have been caused by focused seismic waves resulting from the Imbrium impact.

The mare contains the second instance of a lunar pit discovered on the Moon and one of several outside the Earth to date.

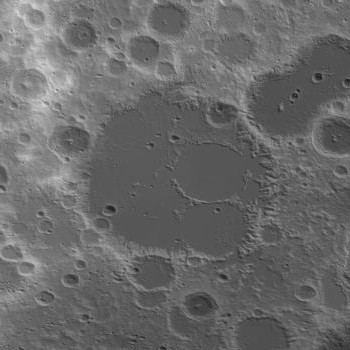
Topographic map

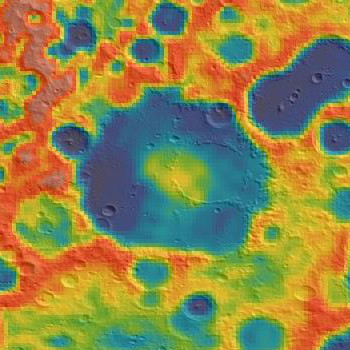
Gravity map based on GRAIL

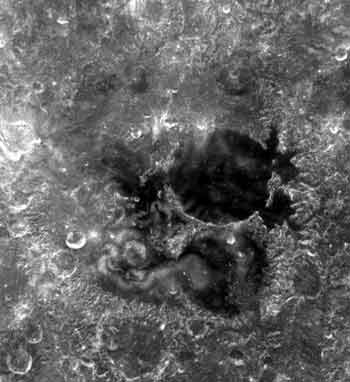
Orthogonal view of Mare Ingenii, showing variation in albedo

Mare Ingenii as viewed by Apollo 17, facing south

== See also ==
- Mare Desiderii
- Volcanism on the Moon

== Lunar Reconnaissance Orbiter Camera (LROC) articles ==
- The Swirls of Mare Ingenii,
- Depths of Mare Ingenii
