= Mare Desiderii =

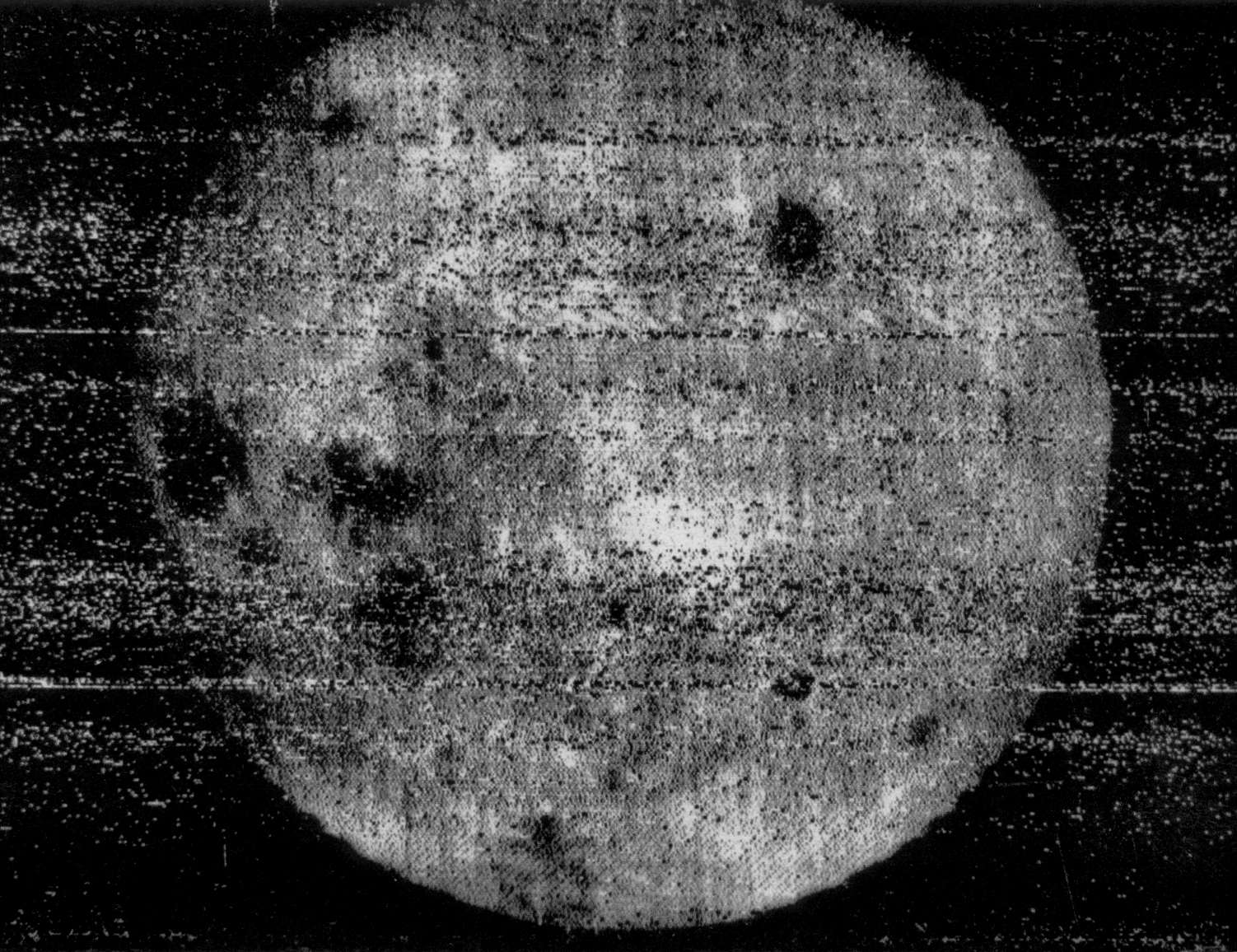
- Luna 3 image of the far side
- Coordinates: 33.7°S 163.5°E
- Eponym: Sea of Desires

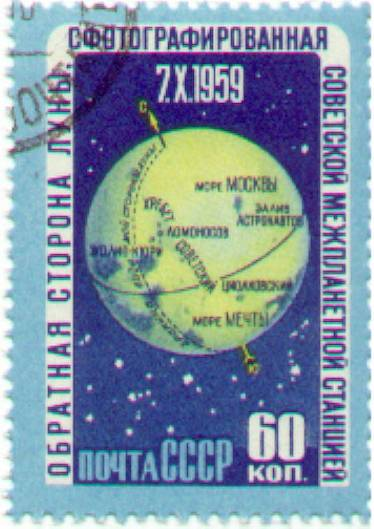
A stamp from the Soviet Union showing a map based on the Luna 3 images.

Mare Desiderii /dɛsɪˈdɪəriaɪ/ (Latin dēsīderiī, the "Sea of Desires") was an area of the Moon named after Luna 3 returned the first pictures of the far side in 1959.

Early publications of the Luna 3 image referred to the Mare as Mechta, the Russian word for dream. Mechta was an alternate name for the Luna 1 spacecraft. The feature was also called the Dream Sea or the Sea of Dreams. Other references called it Mare Somnii, Latin for the Sea of Dreams.

It was later determined to be an optical illusion in the low quality image. The International Astronomical Union (IAU) removed the name from the list of lunar nomenclature in 1960. Instead this area includes a smaller mare, Mare Ingenii (Sea of Ingenuity or Cleverness), and other dark craters overlapping with the South Pole-Aitken Basin.

The naming of this and other features by the Soviet Union was considered controversial at the time. The newly named places on Soviet lunar maps were perceived as an extension of Soviet territory. The IAU was then given the responsibility for naming newly discovered features.
