= Respighi (surname) =

Respighi (pronounced [reˈspiːɡi]) is an Italian surname from Lombardy and Emilia. It may refer to:

- Carlo Respighi (1873–1947), Italian Roman Catholic priest
- Elsa Respighi (1894–1996), Italian composer
- Emilio Respighi (1860–1936), Italian dermatologist
- Lorenzo Respighi (1824–1889), Italian astronomer, mathematician and natural philosopher
  - Respighi (crater), lunar crater named after him
  - 16930 Respighi, minor planet named after him
- Ottorino Respighi (1879–1936), Italian musician and composer
- Pietro Respighi (1843–1913), Italian Roman Catholic cardinal
