= Dubyago =

Dubyago may refer to:

== Astronomy ==
- Dubyago (crater), lunar crater

== People ==
- Dmitry Dubyago, Russian astronomer
- Alexander Dubyago, Soviet astronomer
