= C/1921 H1 (Dubiago) =

Halley-type comet

Discovery
- Discovered by: Alexander Dubyago
- Discovery site: Kazan Observatory
- Discovery date: 24 April 1921

Designations
- Alternative designations: 1921c 1921 I

Orbital characteristics
- Epoch: 21 May 1921 (JD 2422830.5)
- Observation arc: 40 days
- Number of observations: 27
- Aphelion: 33.088 AU
- Perihelion: 1.1161 AU
- Semi-major axis: 17.102 AU
- Eccentricity: 0.93474
- Orbital period: 70.73 years
- Inclination: 22.345°
- Longitude of ascending node: 67.127°
- Argument of periapsis: 97.481°
- Last perihelion: 5 May 1921 (last observation); 9 August 1982 (calculated)
- Next perihelion: 25 June 2041
- T_{Jupiter}: 1.496
- Earth MOID: 0.384 AU
- Jupiter MOID: 0.817 AU

Physical characteristics
- Apparent magnitude: 10.5 (1921 apparition)

Dubiago's Comet, formally known as C/1921 H1 by its modern nomenclature, is a faint Halley-type comet that completes an orbit around the Sun once every 61–79 years. It was predicted to return in 1982, but it was not observed. It will next return to the inner Solar System by 2041.

== Discovery and observations ==
The comet was first spotted from the Kazan Observatory on the evening of 24 April 1921. Initially, the discovery of the comet was incorrectly credited to Dmitri Dubyago, but the attribution was later clarified to Alexander Dubyago a year later.
