= McGetchin =

McGetchin may refer to:

- Thomas R. McGetchin (1936–1979), American geologist and planetary scientist
- McGetchin (crater), a lunar crater
- 2891 McGetchin, an asteroid
