= Pomortsev =

Pomortsev may refer to:

- Pomortsev (crater), a lunar crater
- Albert Pomortsev (born 1939), Russian bandy executive
- Mikhail Pomortsev (1851–1916), Russian military officer, meteorologist and engineer
