= Stewart (crater) =

Crater on the Moon

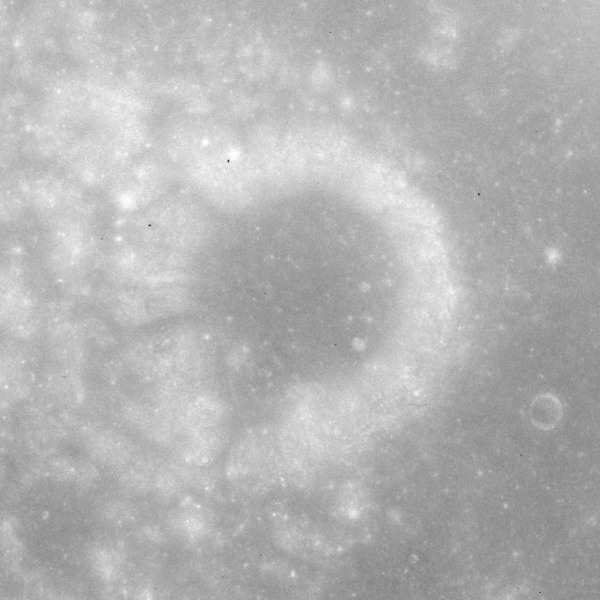
- Apollo 15 image
- Coordinates: 2.2°N 67.0°E
- Diameter: 13 km
- Colongitude: 293° at sunrise
- Eponym: John Q. Stewart

Stewart is a small lunar impact crater that lies to the northeast of the Mare Spumans, a small lunar mare near the eastern limb of the Moon. It was named after American astrophysicist John Quincy Stewart. It is located to the north of the crater Pomortsev, and to the southwest of the lava-flooded Dubyago. Stewart was previously designated Dubyago Q before being named by the IAU. This is a circular crater with a low outer rim and a level, featureless interior floor.
