= Boethius (lunar crater) =

Crater on the Moon

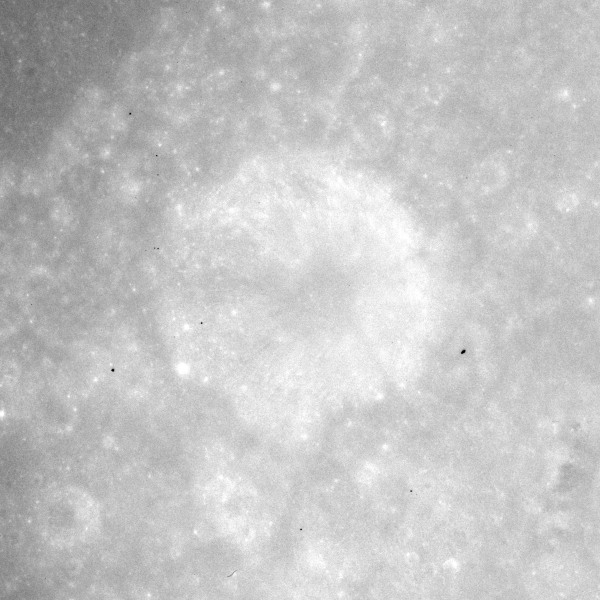
- Apollo 15 image
- Coordinates: 5.57°N 72.33°E
- Diameter: 11.17 km (6.94 mi)
- Depth: 1.7 km
- Colongitude: 288° at sunrise
- Eponym: Boethius

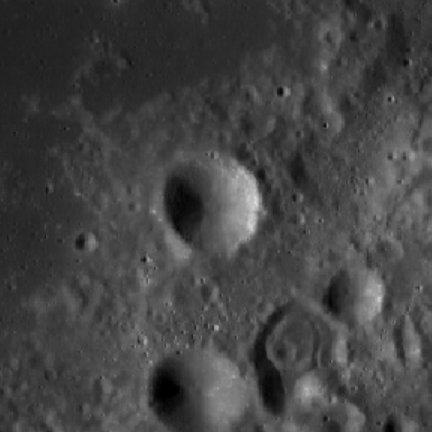
LRO image

Boethius is a small lunar impact crater located on the east edge of Mare Undarum near the eastern lunar limb. To the southwest is the dark, lava-flooded crater Dubyago. Boethius is circular and cup-shaped, with inner walls sloping down to the tiny central floor. It has a higher albedo than the surrounding terrain, and is not overlain by other impact craters of note.

This crater was named after the Roman philosopher Boethius (c. A.D. 470–524). Before its designation was adopted by the International Astronomical Union in 1976, it was identified as Dubyago U.
