= Barnaba Oriani =

Italian priest, astronomer and scientist (1752–1832)

Barnaba Oriani FRS, FRSE
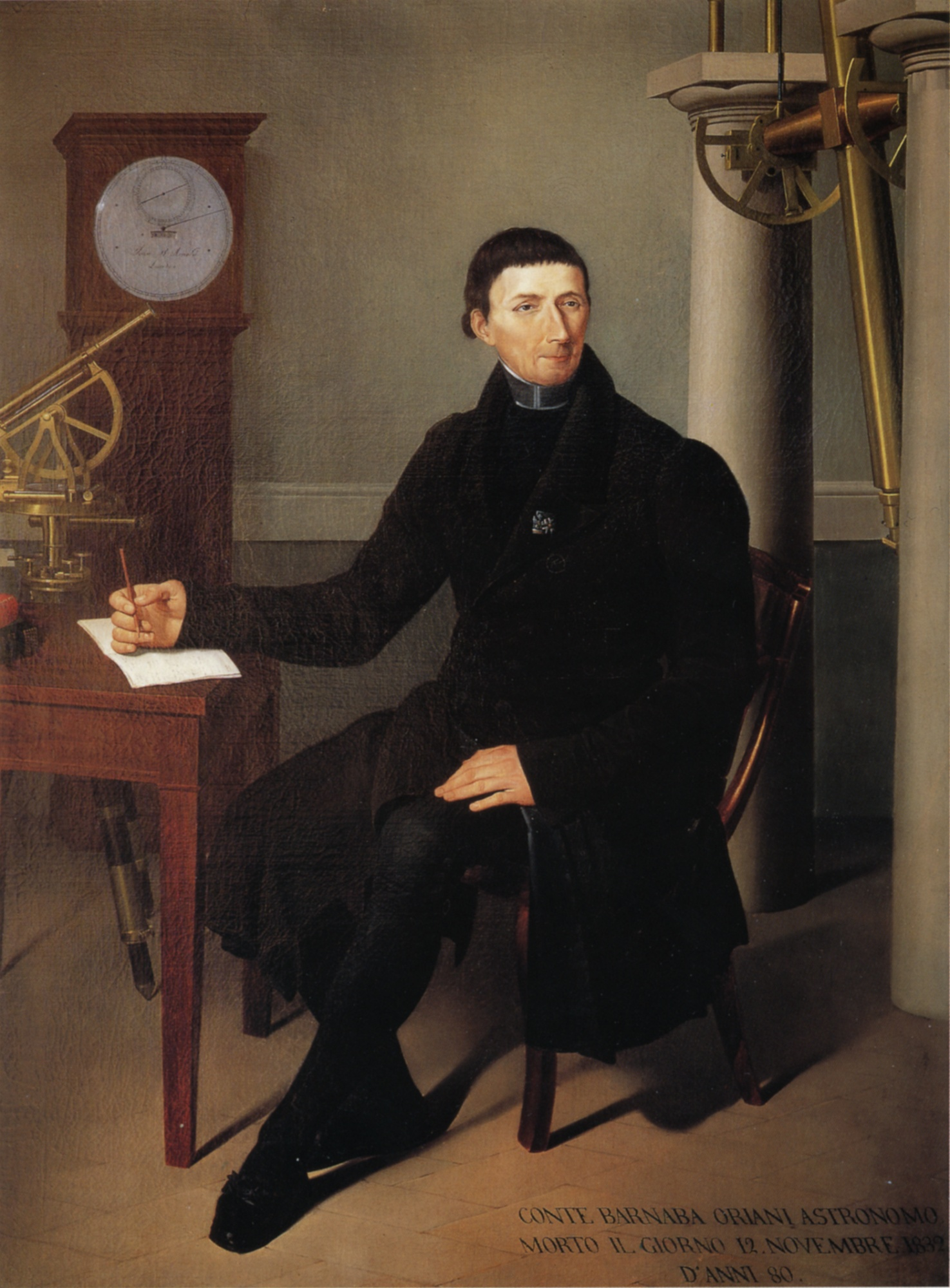
- Portrait of Barnaba Oriani by Pietro Narducci, 1830
- Born: 17 July 1752; Garegnano, Milan, Duchy of Milan
- Died: 12 November 1832 (aged 80); Milan, Kingdom of Lombardy–Venetia
- Occupations: Catholic priest; Geodesist; Astronomer; Scientist
- Known for: Detailed research of the planet Uranus; Oriani's theorem
- Parent(s): Giorgio Oriani and Margherita Oriani (née Galli)
- Scientific career
- Fields: astronomy
- Workplaces: Brera Astronomical Observatory
- Notable students: Francesco Carlini

Barnaba Oriani FRS FRSE (17 July 1752 – 12 November 1832) was an Italian priest, geodesist, astronomer and scientist, known for Oriani's theorem and for his research on Uranus. His skill in spherical trigonometry enabled him to be the first in computing the path and perturbations of the first dwarf planet, Ceres (discovered by his friend Piazzi in 1801). Oriani was also the first to determine the orbit of Uranus.

== Life ==
Oriani was born in the small village of Garegnano (now part of Milan) on 17 July 1752, to a family of humble origins. His father Giorgio was a mason.

After receiving an elementary education in Garegnano, he went on to study at the College of San Alessandro in Milan, under the tutelage and with the support of the Order of Barnabites, which he later joined. After completing his studies in the humanities, physical and mathematical sciences, philosophy, and theology, he was ordained a priest in 1775. The Barnabite father Paolo Frisi, professor at the Palatine Schools of Milan, introduced him to theoretical astronomy.

In 1776, at the age of 23, he became an apprentice astronomer in the Brera Astronomical Observatory of Milan, directed by the famous Jesuit polymath Roger Joseph Boscovich. Thanks to his gifts as an observational astronomer, Oriani rapidly raised in status. In 1786 he obtained funds from the Austrian Government for a journey to visit the most highly regarded European research institutions, and with the task of commissioning Jesse Ramsden a new large mural quadrant 8 feet in radius. The instrument was shipped to Genoa in December 1790 and installed in Brera the following year.

When Napoleon I established the Republic of Lombardy, Oriani refused to swear an oath against the monarchy, and the new republican government modified the oath of allegiance on his behalf. He was retained in his position at the observatory and was made president of the commission appointed to introduce the metric system to Lombardy. In 1800 he was summoned by Napoleon to take part in the organisational committee for the new Italian Republic.

When the republic became a Napoleonic kingdom, Oriani was awarded the Iron Crown and the Legion of Honour, was made a count and senator, and was appointed to measure the arc of the meridian between the zeniths of Rimini and Rome.

When Lombardy returned under Austrian rule in 1814, the work of the observatory went on uninterrupted. Oriani retired in 1817, handing over the directorship to Boscovich's pupil Angelo Cesaris, but he continued to live in Brera and to carry out observations alongside his young pupil Francesco Carlini. He died in Milan on 12 November 1832.

Oriani was a devoted friend of the Theatine monk Giuseppe Piazzi, the discoverer of Ceres. He was the first person to whom Piazzi communicated his discovery. Oriani and Piazzi worked together for thirty-seven years, cooperating on many astronomical observations.

== Astronomy ==
Given his strong interest in astronomy, Oriani was appointed on the staff of the Observatory of Brera in Milan in 1776, becoming assistant astronomer in 1778 and director in 1802. In 1778 he began publishing various in-depth dissertations on astronomical objects, the Effemeridi di Milano (Ephemerides of Milan). On May 5, 1779, he discovered the Virgo Cluster galaxy Messier 61, using a 3.6" refractor at Brera Observatory.

A very capable astronomer, Oriani's work began to attract considerable attention. His research in the areas of astronomic refraction, the obliquity of the ecliptic, and orbital theory were of considerable noteworthiness in themselves; but his greatest achievement was his detailed research of the planet Uranus, which had been discovered by Sir William Herschel in 1781. Oriani devoted significant time to observations of Uranus, calculating its orbital properties which he published as a booklet of tables in 1783. It was an important work, that won him widespread appreciation and made him famous in Europe.

After others had shown that Uranus was not on a parabolic orbit but rather in a roughly circular orbit, he calculated the orbit in 1783. In 1789, Oriani improved his calculations by accounting for the gravitational effects of Jupiter and Saturn.

In addition to his continual contributions to the Effemeridi, he published a series of memoirs on spherical trigonometry: the Memorie dell'Istituto Italiano, 1806–10, and the Istruzione suelle misure e sui pesi, 1831.

For his work in astronomy, Oriani was honoured by naming asteroid 4540 "Oriani". This asteroid had been discovered at the Osservatorio San Vittore in Bologna, Italy on 6 November 1988.

== Oriani's theorem ==
In De refractionibus astronomicis, Oriani showed that astronomical refraction could be expanded as a series of odd powers of (tan Z), where Z is the observed zenith distance. Such a series had previously been derived by J. H. Lambert, who dropped all but the first term. However, Oriani investigated the higher terms, and he found that neither of the first two terms depended on the structure of the atmosphere.

The series expansion he obtained was effective at up to 85 degrees from the zenith. Unlike previous approximations, however, Oriani's two-term expression did not depend on a hypothesis regarding atmospheric temperature or air density in relation to altitude. Thus, the effects of atmospheric curvature are only dependent upon the temperature and pressure at the location of the observer.

Oriani's theorem explains why Cassini's uniform-density model works well except near the horizon—the atmospheric refraction from the zenith to a zenith distance of 70° is not dependent on the details of the distribution of the gas.

== See also ==
- List of Roman Catholic scientist-clerics

== Bibliography ==
- Gabba, Alberto (1834). Elogio di Barnaba Oriani. Milan: Luigi di Giacomo Pirola.
- Schiaparelli, Giovanni Virginio, ed. (1875). Corrispondenza astronomica fra Giuseppe Piazzi e Barnaba Oriani. Milan: Ulrico Hoepli.
- Schiaparelli, Giovanni Virginio (1881). "Notizie sull'Osservatorio di Brera in Milano". Mediolanum. Vol. II. Milan: Vallardi. pp. 323–327.
- Celoria, Giovanni (1912). "Commemorazione dell'astronomo Barnaba Oriani". Rivista di astronomia. VI: 321–339.
- Meda, Filippo (1932). "Barnaba Oriani nel primo centenario della sua morte". Vita e Pensiero. 11: 651–660.
- Bianchi, Emilio (1933). "Barnaba Oriani". Memorie della Società astronomica italiana. VI (3): 421–440.
- Emanuelli, Pio (1933). "L'astronomo Barnaba Oriani nel primo centenario della morte". Rivista di fisica, matematica e scienze naturali. VII (6–7): 3–26.
- Tagliaferri, Guido; Tucci, Pasquale (1989). "The visit to the Low Countries in 1786 of the astronomer Barnaba Oriani". In C.S. Maffioli; L.C. Palm (eds.). Italian scientists in the Low Countries in the XVIIth and XVIIIth centuries. Amsterdam: Rodopi. pp. 277–290. doi:10.1163/9789401200110_017.
- Tagliaferri, Guido; Tucci, Pasquale (1993). "Laplace, Oriani, and the Italian meridian degree". In F. Bevilacqua (ed.). Proceedings of the 1st EPS Conference on history of physics in Europe in the 19th and 20th centuries. Bologna: Rodopi. pp. 93–100.
- Agnese Mandrino; Guido Tagliaferri; Pasquale Tucci, eds. (1994). Un viaggio in Europa nel 1786. Diario di Barnaba Oriani astronomo milanese. Florence: Leo S. Olschki. ISBN 9788822241702.
- Tagliaferri, Guido; Tucci, Pasquale (1997). "Alcune lettere inedite di P.S. Laplace a Barnaba Oriani". Quaderni di Storia della Fisica. I: 5–34.
- Chinnici, Ileana (2024). "The Discovery of Ceres: A "Scientific Comedy"". In Ileana Chinnici (ed.). Italian Contributions to Planetary Astronomy. From the Discovery of Ceres to Pluto's Orbit. Historical & Cultural Astronomy. Cham, Switzerland: Springer. pp. 77–102. doi:10.1007/978-3-031-48389-9_5. ISBN 978-3-031-48388-2.
