= 1167 Dubiago =

English

Discovery
- Discovered by: E. F. Skvortsov
- Discovery site: Simeiz Obs.
- Discovery date: 3 August 1930

Designations
- Named after: Alexander Dubyago (also spelled: Dubiago)
- Alternative designations: 1930 PB · 1931 VJ_{1} 1938 WW · 1950 QX; A924 RF
- Minor planet category: main-belt · (outer)

Orbital characteristics
- Epoch 4 September 2017 (JD 2458000.5)
- Uncertainty parameter 0
- Observation arc: 86.71 yr (31,671 days)
- Aphelion: 3.6517 AU
- Perihelion: 3.1772 AU
- Semi-major axis: 3.4145 AU
- Eccentricity: 0.0695
- Orbital period (sidereal): 6.31 yr (2,305 days)
- Mean anomaly: 314.09°
- Mean motion: 0° 9^{m} 22.32^{s} / day
- Inclination: 5.7477°
- Longitude of ascending node: 223.39°
- Argument of perihelion: 71.344°

Physical characteristics
- Dimensions: 63.12±5.6 km (IRAS:17); 75.79±0.90 km
- Synodic rotation period: 14.3 h 34.8374±0.0990 h
- Geometric albedo: 0.036±0.001; 0.0509±0.010 (IRAS:17)
- Spectral type: Tholen = D · D B–V = 0.743; U–B = 0.196
- Absolute magnitude (H): 9.51±0.29 · 9.513±0.001 (R) · 9.85

1167 Dubiago, provisional designation 1930 PB, is a dark asteroid from the outer region of the asteroid belt, approximately 63 kilometers in diameter. It was discovered on 3 August 1930, by Soviet astronomer Evgenii Skvortsov at Simeiz Observatory on the Crimean peninsula, and named after astronomer Alexander Dubyago.

== Classification and orbit ==
Dubiago orbits the Sun in the outer main-belt at a distance of 3.2–3.7 AU once every 6 years and 4 months (2,305 days). Its orbit has an eccentricity of 0.07 and an inclination of 6° with respect to the ecliptic. In 1924, it was first identified as A924 RF at the discovering observatory. The body's observation arc begins at Yerkes Observatory about two months after its official discovery at Simeiz.

== Physical characteristics ==
In the Tholen classification, Dubiago is a D-type asteroid, a group of 46 known bodies, mostly being Jupiter trojans and centaurs such as 10199 Chariklo and 624 Hektor. It is thought that the Martian moon Phobos has a similar composition, and that the Tagish Lake meteorite origins from a D-type asteroid.

=== Lightcurves ===
In March 1990, a rotational lightcurve of Dubiago was obtained using the Nordic Optical Telescope at the La Palma site on the Canary Islands. Lightcurve analysis gave a rotation period of 14.3 hours with a brightness variation of 0.23 magnitude (U=2). A second lightcurve was obtained in the R-band at the Palomar Transient Factory in October 2013, giving an alternative period solution of 34.8374 hours with an amplitude of 0.21 magnitude (U=2).

=== Diameter and albedo ===
According to the surveys carried out by the Infrared Astronomical Satellite IRAS and the Japanese Akari satellite, Dubiago measures 63.12 and 75.79 kilometers in diameter, and its surface has an albedo of 0.051 and 0.036, respectively. The Collaborative Asteroid Lightcurve Link adopts the results obtained by IRAS with an absolute magnitude of 9.85.

== Naming ==
This minor planet was named in honor of Alexander Dubyago (1903–1959), a renowned astronomer of the Soviet Union. The lunar crater Dubyago is also named in his and his father's honour. The approved naming was suggested by the Russian Institute of Theoretical Astronomy (ITA) and the official naming citation was published by the Minor Planet Center on 1 June 1967 (M.P.C. 2740).
