= Chinnici =

Chinnici is an Italian surname. Notable people with this surname include:

- Caterina Chinnici (born 1954), Italian magistrate and politician
- Ileana Chinnici, Italian historian of astronomy
- Joseph W. Chinnici (1919–2007), American politician
- Rocco Chinnici (1925–1983), Italian magistrate
