= Liouville (crater) =

Crater on the Moon

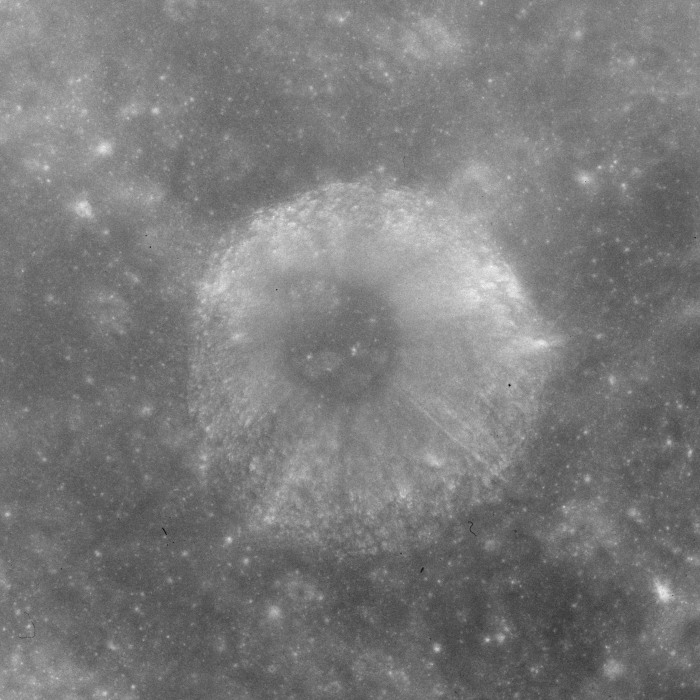
- Apollo 15 image
- Coordinates: 2.6°N 73.5°E
- Diameter: 16 km
- Depth: 2.7 km
- Colongitude: 287° at sunrise
- Eponym: Joseph Liouville

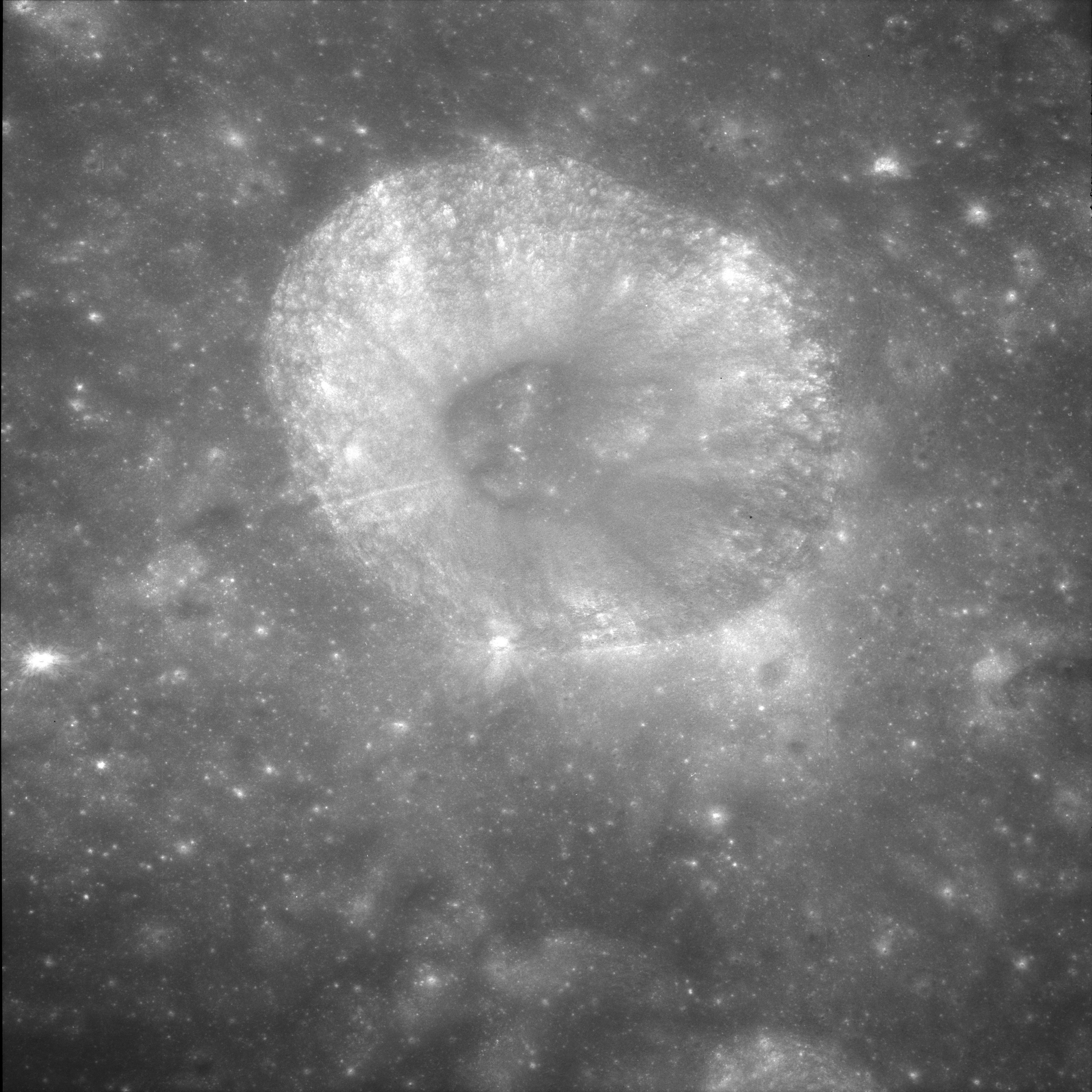
Apollo 11 image

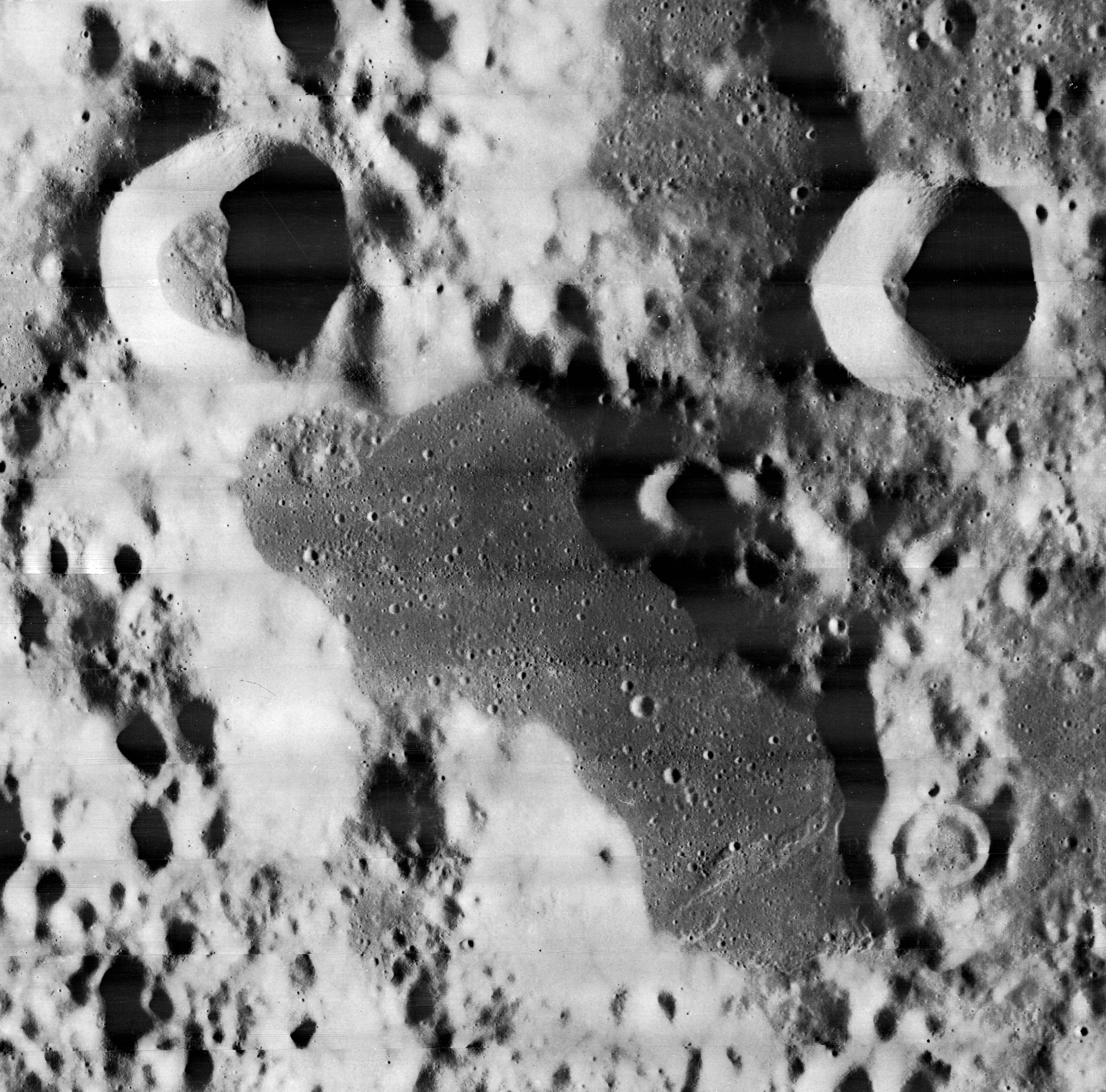
The craters Liouville (upper right) and Respighi (upper left) from Lunar Orbiter 1. The dark, flat plain in the lower half is known as Schubert N.

Liouville is a small lunar impact crater that is located near the eastern limb of the Moon. It was named after French mathematician Joseph Liouville. It lies to the southeast of the larger crater Dubyago, and was previously designated Dubyago S before being given a name by the IAU.

The crater is circular and bowl-shaped, with a small interior floor at the midpoint of the sloping interior walls. The western and northwestern rim is attached to a depression in the surface that has the appearance of a distorted crater formation. Farther to the west is the comparably sized Respighi.
