= Pomortsev (crater) =

Crater on the Moon

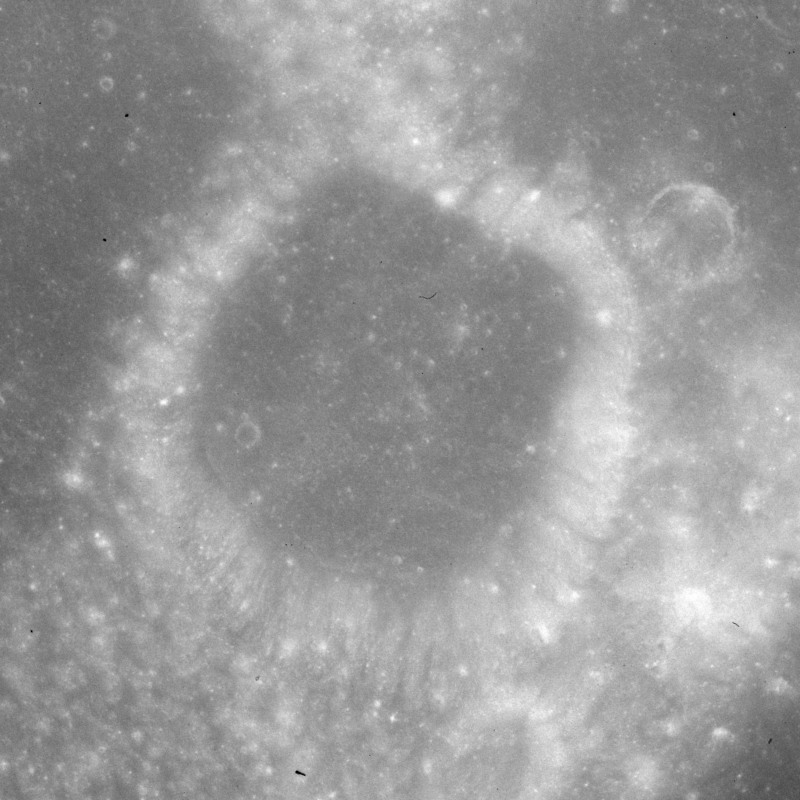
- Apollo 15 image
- Coordinates: 0.7°N 66.9°E
- Diameter: 23 km
- Colongitude: 293° at sunrise
- Eponym: Mikhail Pomortsev

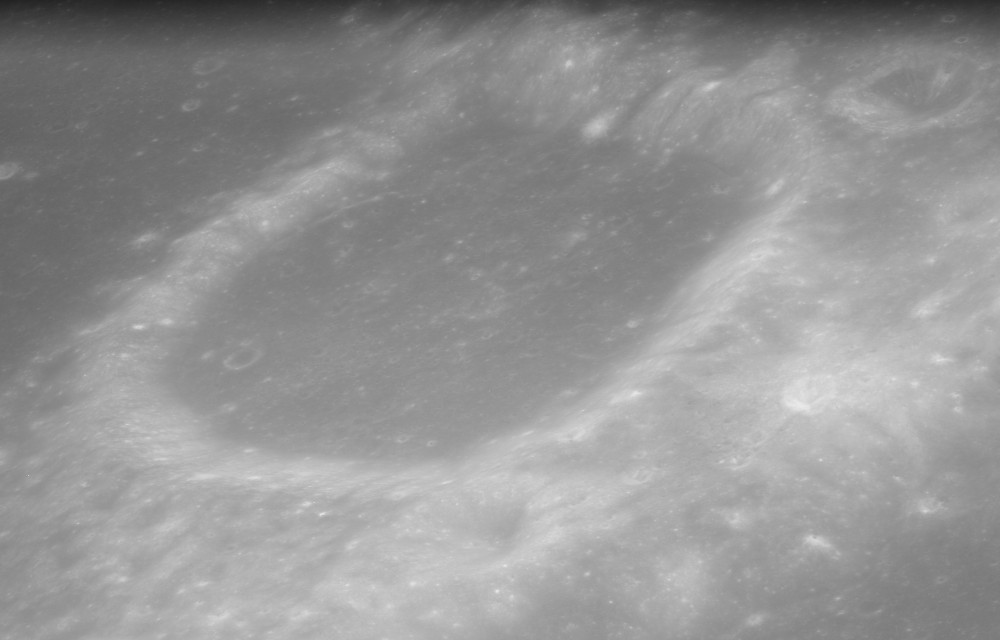
Oblique view of interior from Apollo 16

Pomortsev is a small lunar impact crater that is located in the eastern part of the Moon's near side. It was named after Russian rocketry scientist Mikhail Pomortsev. It lies on the eastern edge of Mare Spumans, to the southwest of the crater Dubyago. This formation was previously designated Dubyago P. One crater diameter to the north is the smaller Stewart.

The nearly featureless interior of this crater has been resurfaced by basaltic lava, leaving a dark floor with an albedo that nearly matches the lunar mare to the west. The crater it roughly circular, with slight outward bulges to the north and northeast. The inner wall is wider along the southern half of the rim, and at its narrowest along the northwestern rim where the crater makes contact with Mare Spumans.
