= Emilio Respighi =

Italian dermatologist (1860–1936)

Emilio Respighi (23 December 1860 – April 1936) was an Italian dermatologist born in Parma.

== Biography ==
He was a member of the Cortemaggiore Respighi Family: Pietro Respighi, Cardinal and Archpriest of the Basilica of St. John Lateran, Lorenzo Respighi, astronomer and Ottorino Respighi, composer, musicologist and conductor. Trained at the University of Parma, he specialized in dermatology.

In 1892 he described for the first time a dermatologic disease not yet known, which he called figurative centrifugal atrophic hyperkeratosis. In 1893 he taught at Bologna and in 1903 in Perugia, where he used x-ray to treat dermatological diseases.

In 1887 he succeeded Lorenzo Berzieri as director of the Tabiano Terme spa, where he stayed until 1912.

From 1924 he was consultant for the spa di Tabiano, then for the spa of Salsomaggiore Terme from 1926 to 1932. In November 1932 he retired to Milan where he died in April 1936.

In 1959 the today's Tabiano spa was dedicated in his name.

== Works ==
- Emilio Respighi (1890). Tabiano. Stazione balneare di acque e fanghi solforosi (in Italian). G. Ferrari & figli.
- Emilio Respighi (1894). Un caso di sclerodermia a piccole placche, simmetrica antica (in Italian). Fratelli Rivara.
- Emilio Respighi (1895). Sull'ipercheratosi eccentrica: nuovo contributo (in Italian). Fratelli Rivara.
- Emilio Respighi (1896). Di una singalore ipercheratosi (in Italian).
