= Nephoscope =

Meteorological instrument for determining the direction and relative speed of clouds

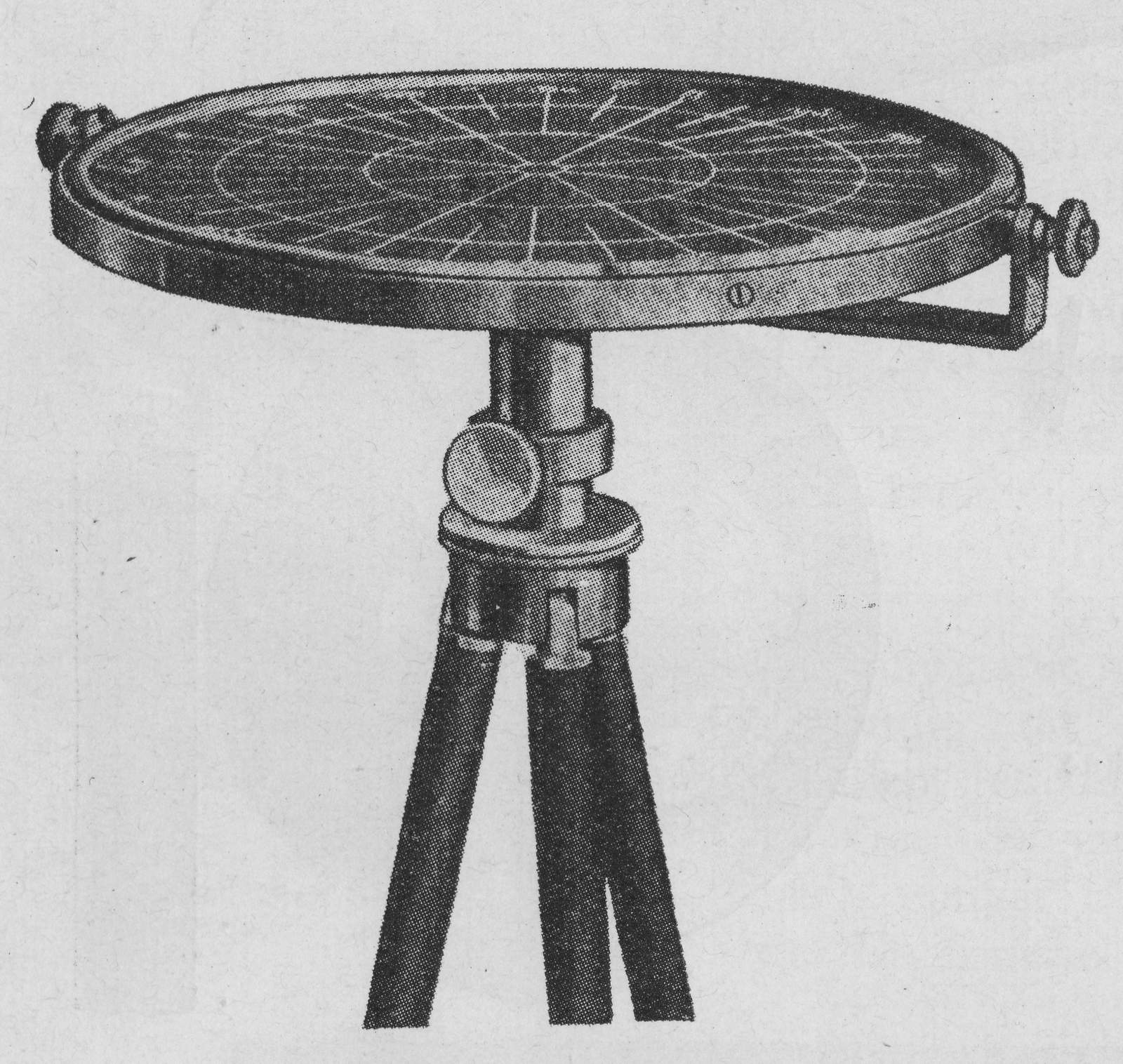
- Mirror Nephoscope
- Uses: Measuring the altitude, direction, and velocity of clouds
- Inventor: Carl Gottfrid Fineman, Louis Besson and Mikhail Pomortsev

A nephoscope is a 19th-century instrument for measuring the altitude, direction, and velocity of clouds, using transit-time measurement. This is different from a nephometer, which is an instrument used in measuring the amount of cloudiness.

== Description ==
A nephoscope emits a light ray, which strikes and reflects off the base of a targeted cloud. The distance to the cloud can be estimated using the delay between sending the light ray and receiving it back:

distance = (speed of light × travel time) / 2

== Mirror nephoscope ==
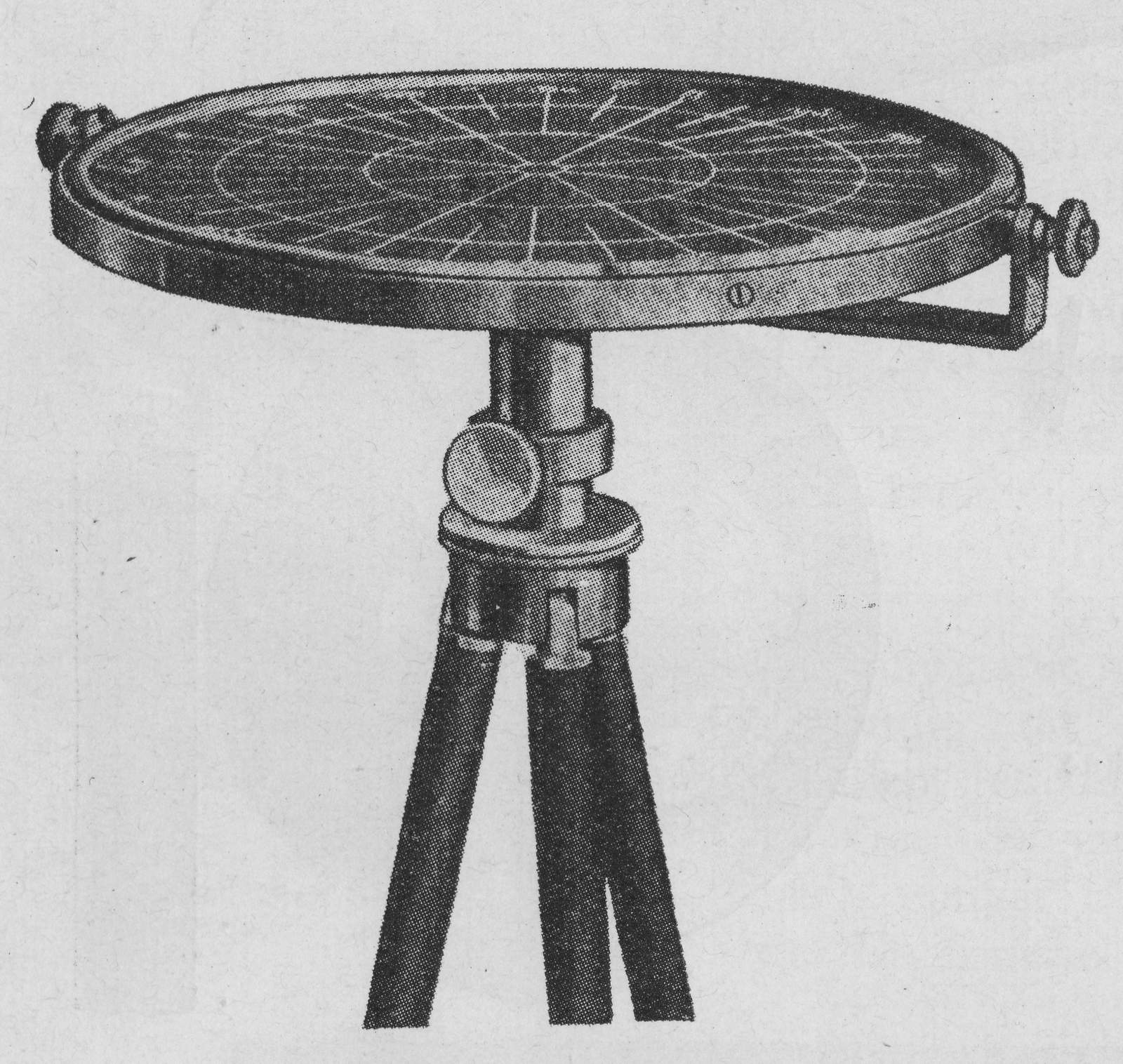
Mirror Nephoscope

Developed by Carl Gottfrid Fineman, this instrument consists of a magnetic compass, the case of which is covered with a black mirror, around which is movable a circular metal frame. A little window in this mirror enables the observer to see the tip of the compass needle underneath. On the surface of the mirror are engraved three concentric circles and four diameters; one of the latter passes through the middle of the little window. The mirror constitutes a compass card, its radii corresponding to the cardinal points. On the movable frame surrounding the mirror is fixed a vertical pointer graduated in millimeters, which can be moved up and down by means of a rack and pinion. The whole apparatus is mounted on a tripod stand provided with leveling screws.

To make an observation, the mirror is adjusted to the horizontal with the leveling-screws, and is oriented to the meridian by moving the whole apparatus until the compass needle is seen through the window, to lie in the north-south line of the mirror (making, however, allowance for the magnetic declination). The observer stands in such a position as to bring the image of any chosen part of a cloud at the center of the mirror. The vertical pointer is also adjusted by screwing it up or down and by rotating it around the mirror until its tip is reflected in the center of the mirror. As the image of the cloud moves toward the circumference of the mirror, the observer moves his head so as to keep the tip of the pointer and the cloud image in coincidence. The radius along which the image moves gives the direction of the cloud's movement, and the time required to pass from one circle to the next its relative speed, which may be reduced to certain arbitrary units.

This instrument is, however, not very easy to use, and gives only moderately accurate measurements.

== Comb nephoscope ==
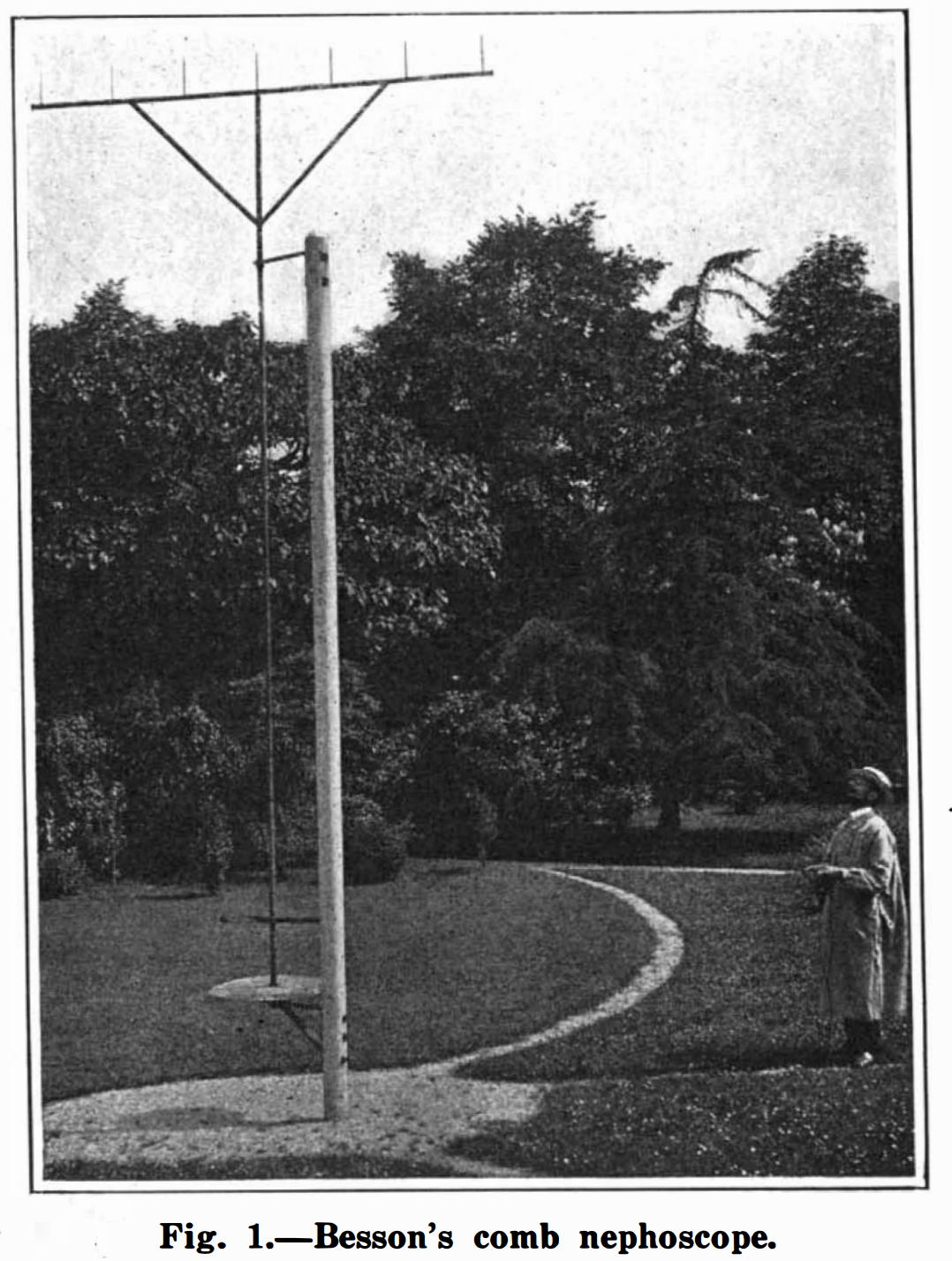
Besson comb nephoscope

Developed by Louis Besson in 1912, this apparatus consists of a horizontal bar fitted with several equidistant spikes and mounted on the upper end of a vertical pole which can be rotated on its axis. When an observation is to be made, the observer places himself in such a position that the central spike is projected on any chosen part of a cloud. Then, without altering his position, he causes the "comb" to turn by means of two cords in such a manner that the cloud is seen to follow along the line of spikes. A graduated circle, turning with the vertical pole, gives the direction of the cloud's motion.

It is read with the aid of a fixed pointer. Moreover, when the apparatus is once oriented, the observer can determine the relative speed of the cloud by noting the time the latter requires to pass from one spike to the next. If the instrument stands on level ground, so that the observer's eye is always at the same height, and if the interval between two successive spikes is equal to one-tenth of their altitude above the eye-level of the observer, one only needs to multiply the time required for the cloud to pass over one interval by 10 to determine the time the cloud travels a horizontal distance equal to its altitude.

Besson revived an old method, invented by Bravais for measuring the actual height of clouds. The apparatus in this case consists of a plate of glass having parallel faces, mounted on a graduated vertical circle which indicates its angle of inclination. A sheet of water, situated at a lower level, serves as a mirror to reflect the cloud. The water is contained in a reservoir of blackened cement surrounded by shrubbery, and is only a small fraction of an inch in depth, so that the wind may not disturb its level surface.

The observer, having mounted the glass plate on the horizontal axis of a theodolite set on a window-sill some 30 or 40 feet above the ground, places his eye close to it and adjusts its inclination so that the images of a cloud reflected in the plate and in the sheet of water coincide. Then from a curve traced once for all on a sheet of plotting paper he reads off the altitude of the cloud corresponding to the observed angle on the glass plate. The curve is plotted from simple trigonometrical calculations.

At the Observatory of Montsouris, the degree of cloudiness, i. e., the amount of the whole sky covered with clouds at a given moment, is determined by means of the nephometer, also devised by Besson. This consists of a convex glass mirror, a segment of a sphere, about twelve inches in diameter, in which is seen the reflection of the celestial vault divided into ten sections of equal area by means of lines engraved on the glass. As shown in the front page engraving, the meteorologist observes through an eyepiece fixed in an invariable position with respect to the mirror, which latter turns freely on a vertical axis. The observer, whose own image partly obstructs sections 8, 9. and 10, notes the degree of cloudiness in the sections numbered 1 to 7. The cloudiness of each section is estimated on a scale of 0 to 10: zero meaning no clouds and 10 entirely overcast. The observer would then rotate the mirror and eyepiece 180 degrees and observes the cloudiness in sections 7, 5, and 2, which represent the regions of the sky that at the first observation corresponded to sections 8, 9, and 10.

== Grid nephoscope ==
The grid nephoscope is a variation of the comb nephoscope, invented in Norway.

== Russian nephoscope ==
Mikhail Pomortsev invented a nephoscope in Russia in 1894.
