= McGetchin (crater) =

Crater on the Moon

- Top-down view of McGetchin crater
- Coordinates: 1.35°N 67.18°E
- Diameter: 222 m
- Depth: 43 m
- Formation: Copernican (2024)
- Eponym: Thomas R. McGetchin

McGetchin is a very young 222 m (728 ft) lunar impact crater that formed in April or May of 2024. The crater is surrounded by a large cold spot that was created when the impact event loosened nearby lunar regolith. It is named after planetary scientist Thomas R. McGetchin.

== Description ==
McGetchin crater location

McGetchin lies one degree north of the lunar equator in the eastern hemisphere, immediately east of Mare Spumans. It sits at the boundary between volcanic mare basalt and ancient anorthosite highlands, near the outer rim of Crisium basin and 330 km (210 mi) from Mare Crisium.

The crater measures on average 222 m (728 ft) in diameter and is up to 43 m (141 ft) deep. It is slightly asymmetrical, with a long axis of 231 m (758 ft) and a short axis of 213 m (699 ft). Its crater wall has slopes averaging 24°, reaching nearly 40° in some sections. The rim has an average height of 8 m (26 ft) above the pre-existing terrain.

== Formation ==
The crater was formed when a small comet or asteroid fragment impacted the Moon sometime between 11 April and 22 May 2024. The impact event released an estimated 6.5×10^{10} kJ of energy (approximately 15 kilotons of TNT equivalent). Impact events of this magnitude are thought to happen on the Moon once every 132 years on average.

McGetchin's formation created a cold spot about 7 km (4.3 mi) wide with nighttime temperatures 8–9 K cooler than surrounding terrain. Cold spots are associated with young craters, but fade within 100 kyr to 1 Myr. They are hypothesized to form when the impact event decompresses nearby lunar regolith, allowing it to cool faster during lunar night.

== History ==
The crater was first captured in images taken by the Lunar Reconnaissance Orbiter's Wide Angle Camera instrument in May 2024, but it was not identified until October 2025 by LRO scientist Robert Wagner during a search for new impact craters. The discovery was published in September 2026 in the journal Science Advances. The crater's name was adopted by the International Astronomical Union on 4 May 2026.
