= Respighi (crater) =

Crater on the Moon

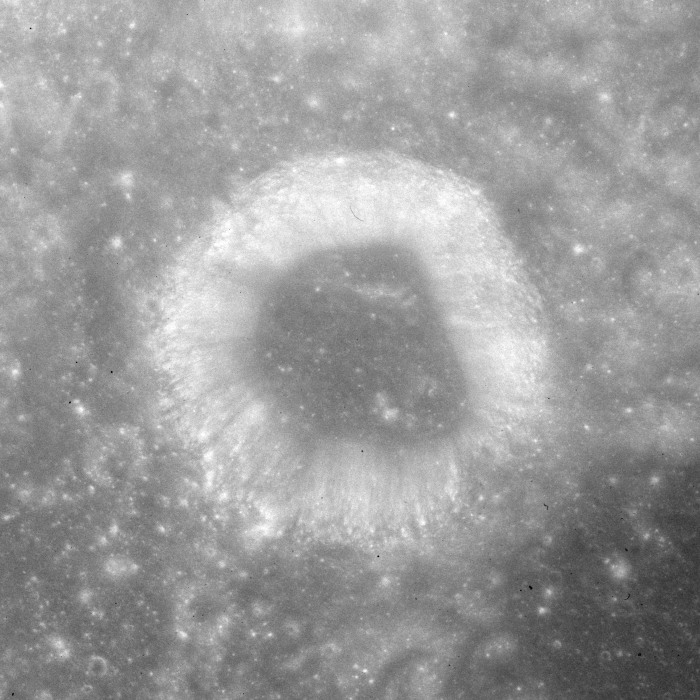
- Apollo 15 image
- Coordinates: 2.8°N 71.9°E
- Diameter: 18 km
- Depth: Unknown
- Colongitude: 289° at sunrise
- Eponym: Lorenzo Respighi

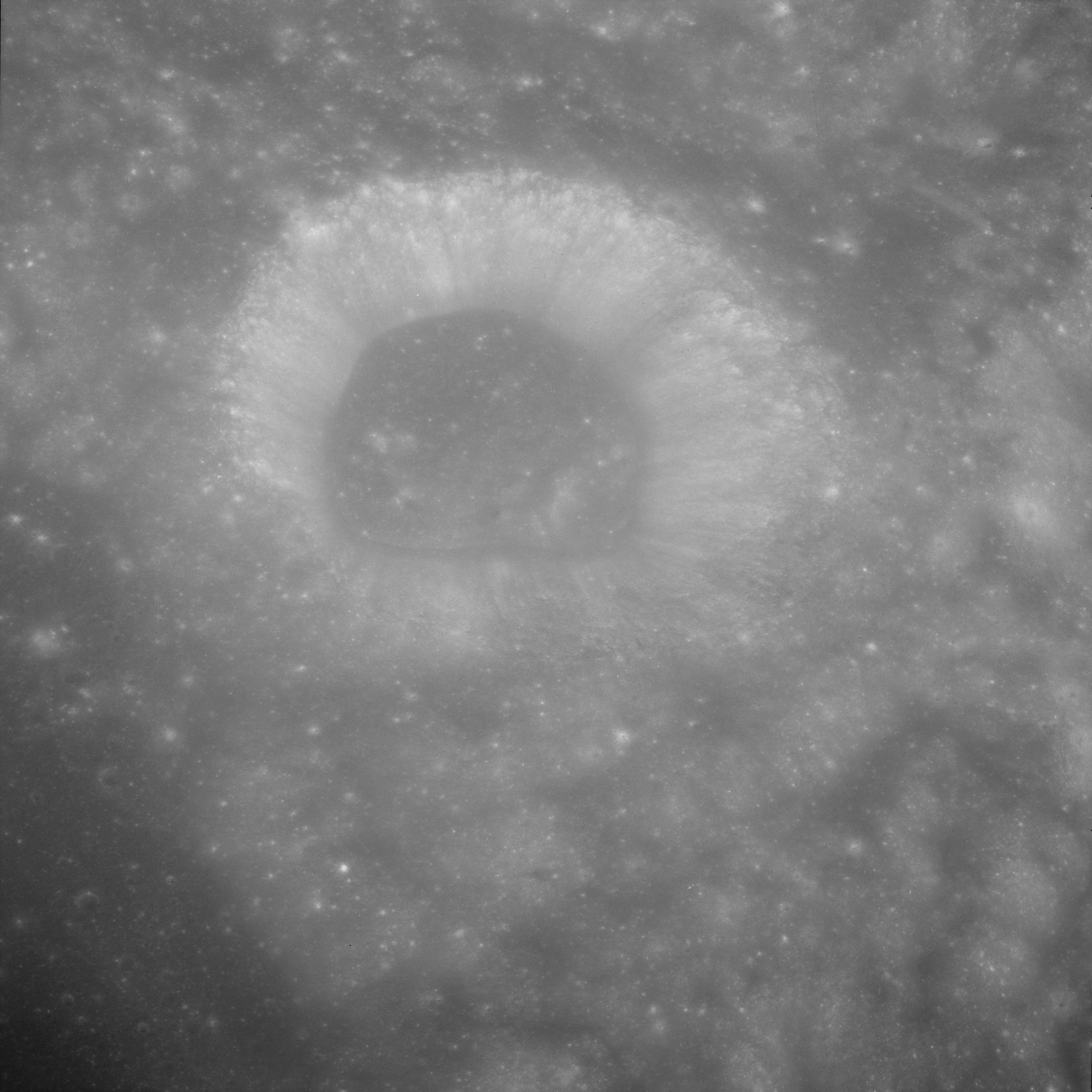
Apollo 11 image

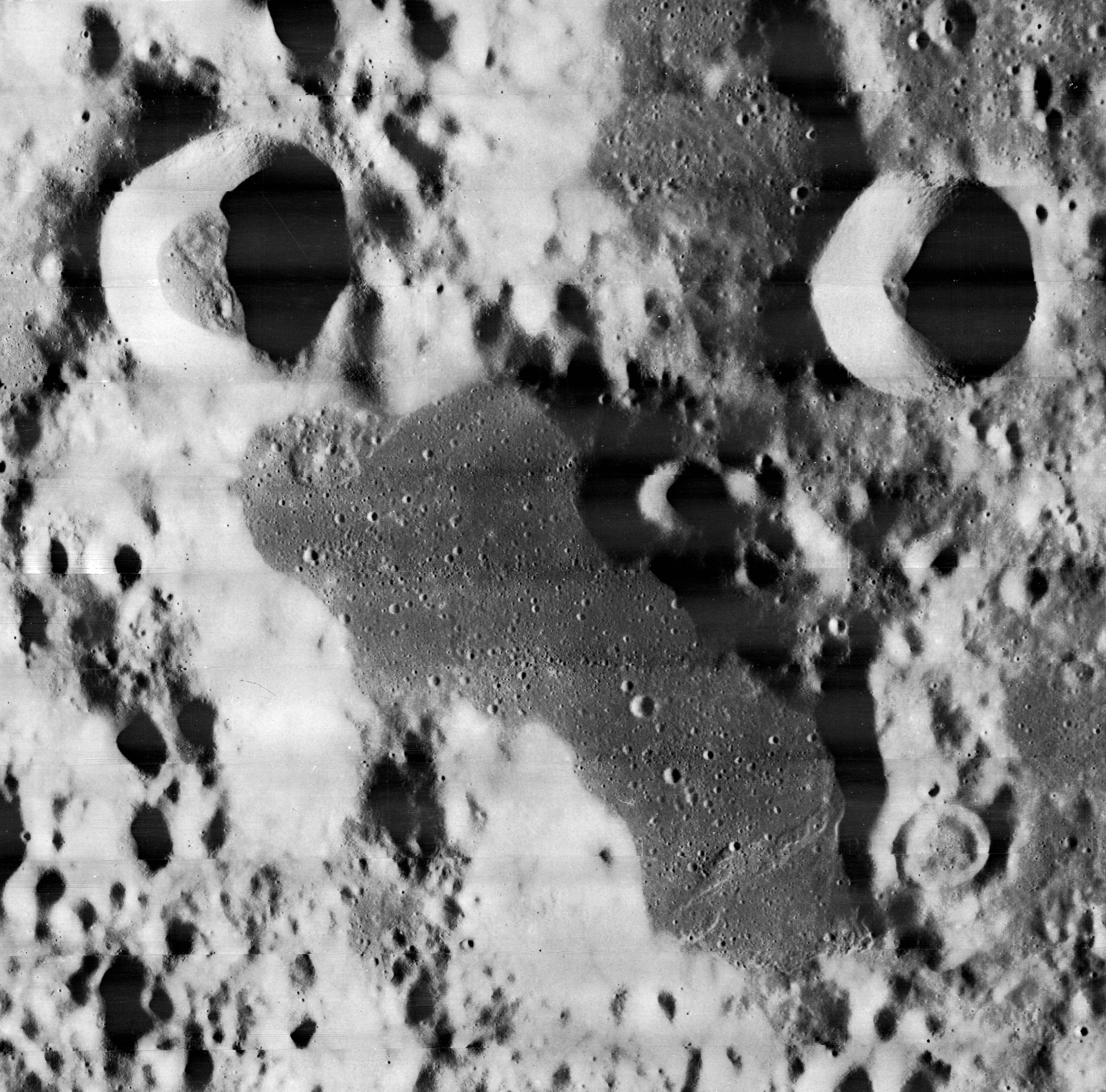
The craters Respighi (upper left) and Liouville (upper right) from Lunar Orbiter 1. The dark, flat plain in the lower half is known as Schubert N.

Respighi is a small lunar impact crater that is located to the southeast of the crater Dubyago, near the eastern limb of the Moon. To the east is the comparably sized Liouville.

This is a crudely circular crater with inner walls that slope down to the relatively darker (lower albedo) interior central floor. The rim has not suffered significant erosion from subsequent impacts, but there is a shallower section to the south. Attached to the southern rim of this crater is Schubert N, a formation that has the appearance of two or more merged craters with a dark, lava-flooded floor that is elongated to the southeast.

Apollo 11 was the spacecraft that took the image of Respighi.

The crater is named for Lorenzo Respighi, 1824–89, Italian mathematician and astronomer. It was formerly identified as Dubyago C.
