= Mikhail Pomortsev =

Russian meteorologist

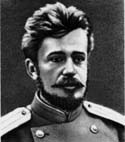
Mikhail Pomortsev.

Mikhail Mikhaylovich Pomortsev (Russian: Михаил Михайлович Поморцев, July 24, 1851, Vasilyevshchina – July 2, 1916, all n.s.) was a Russian military officer, meteorologist and engineer. He invented a Nephoscope in 1894. A lunar crater Pomortsev is named after him.

One of the pioneers in the field of Russian aeronautics and rocketry, Pomortsev conducted research into solid-propellant rockets in the early 20th century. In his military career, Pomortsev reached the rank of Artillery General; he taught at the Mikhailovskaya Military Artillery Academy in St Petersburg.
