= Dubyago (crater) =

Crater on the Moon

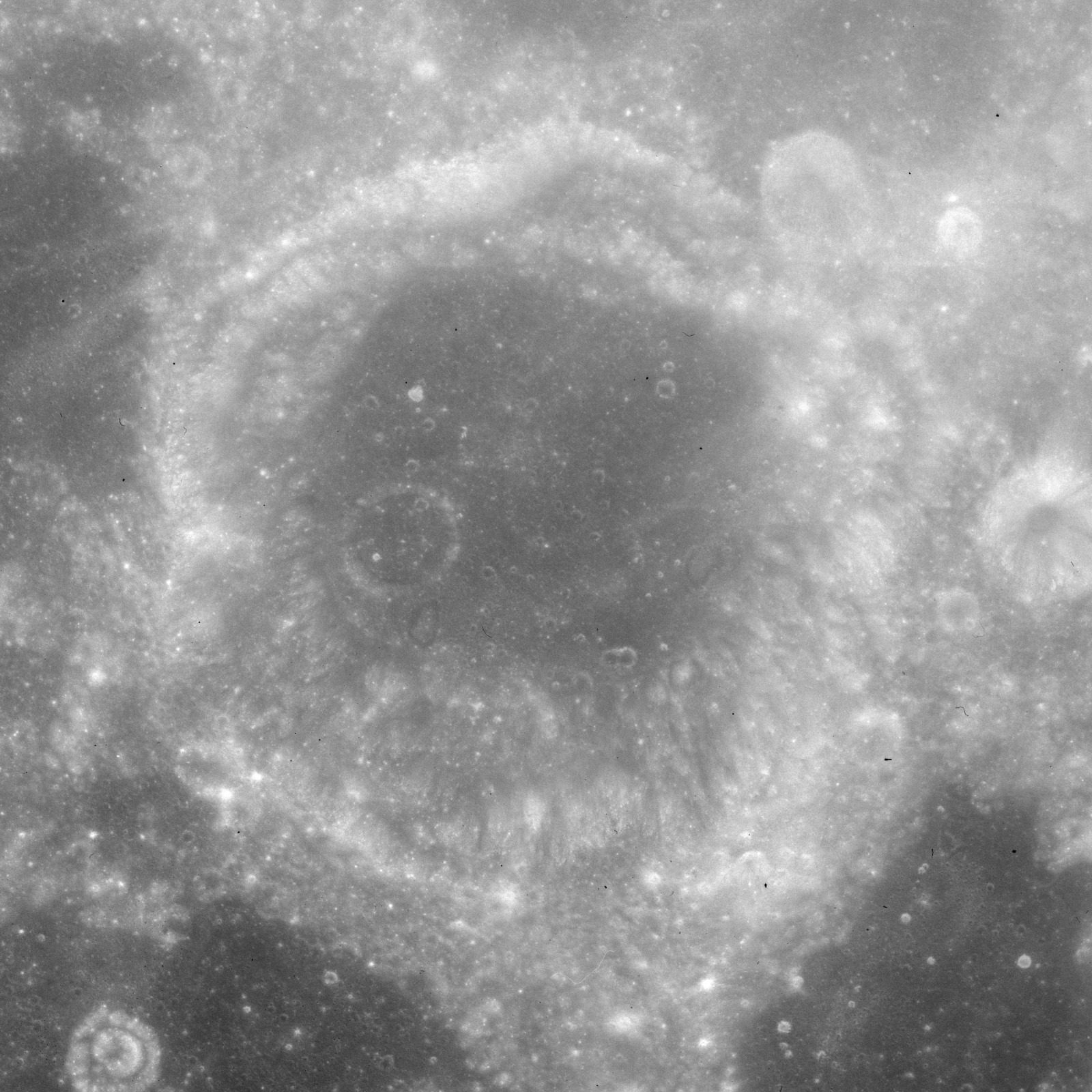
- Apollo 15 image
- Coordinates: 4.4°N 70.0°E
- Diameter: 48.12 km (29.90 mi)
- Depth: 2.7 km (1.7 mi)
- Colongitude: 291° at sunrise
- Eponym: Dmitry Dubyago and Alexander Dubyago

Dubyago is a lunar impact crater that lies near the eastern limb of the Moon. It appears significantly foreshortened when viewed from the Earth. This formation lies along the southern shore of the Mare Undarum, to the southeast of the crater Firmicus.

This crater has a somewhat worn outer rim which dips down to a low point along the northern rim, and has its maximum altitude along the eastern side. The most notable aspect of this crater, however, is the dark hue of the interior floor which matches the albedo of the lunar mare to the northwest. This darker shading makes the crater stand out somewhat from its surroundings.

This crater is named after Russian astronomers Dmitry Dubyago (1850–1918) and his son Alexander Dubyago (1903–1959). Their name was introduced into lunar nomenclature by David W. G. Arthur and Ewen Whitaker with the Rectified Lunar Atlas (1963). Its designation was officially adopted by the International Astronomical Union in 1964. The name of this crater has been spelled Dubiago in some publications.

== Satellite craters ==
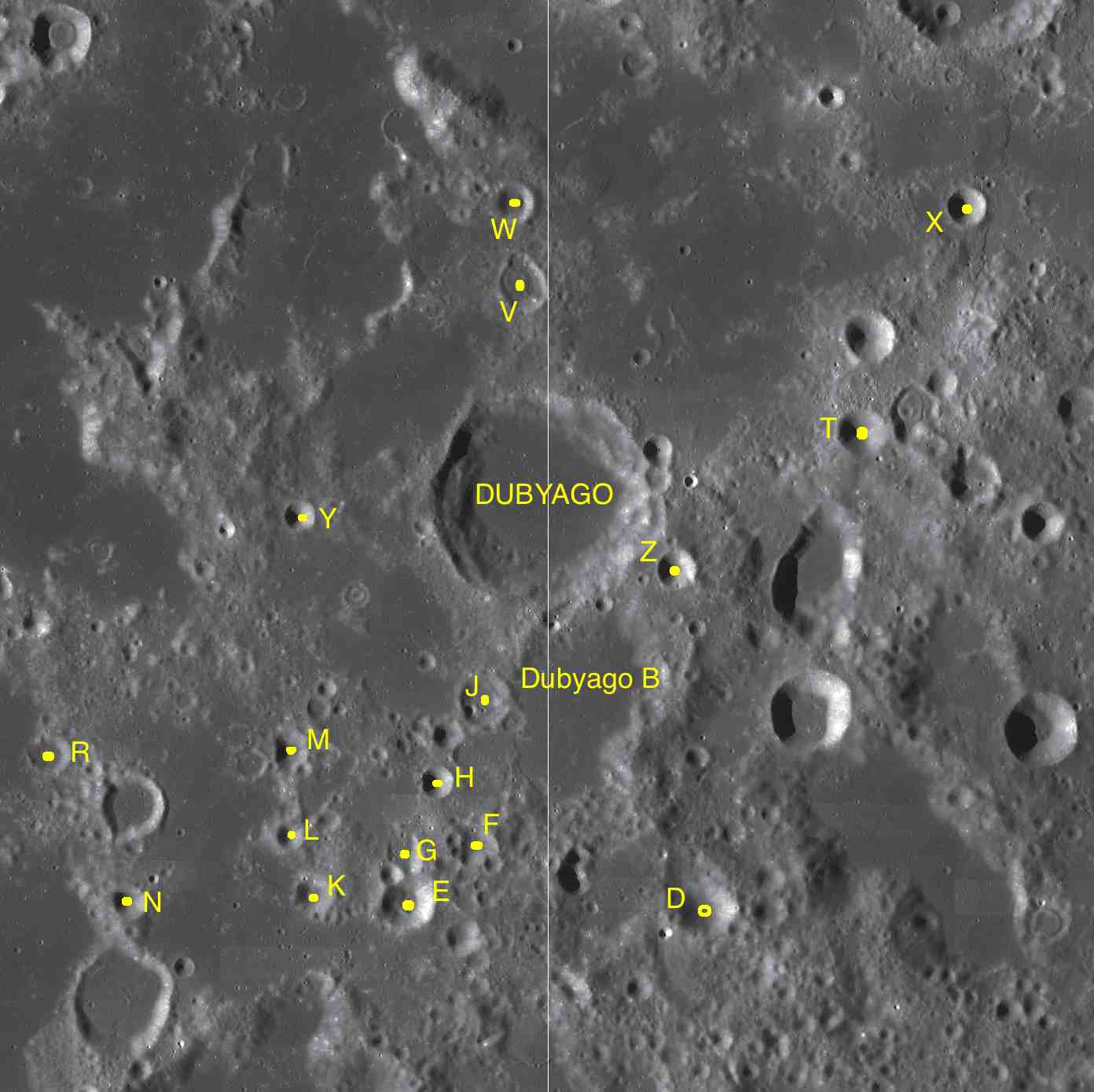
Satellite craters of Dubyago

By convention these features are identified on lunar maps by placing the letter on the side of the crater midpoint that is closest to Dubyago.

Dubyago	Latitude	Longitude	Diameter
B	2.8° N	70.2° E	36 km
D	1.4° N	71.2° E	14 km
E	1.3° N	69.0° E	12 km
F	1.8° N	69.4° E	9 km
G	1.8° N	69.0° E	9 km
H	2.3° N	69.2° E	8 km
J	2.9° N	69.6° E	11 km
K	1.5° N	68.2° E	9 km
L	1.9° N	68.1° E	7 km
M	2.5° N	68.1° E	12 km
N	1.4° N	67.0° E	7 km
R	2.5° N	66.3° E	8 km
T	4.8° N	72.3° E	9 km
V	5.9° N	70.0° E	12 km
W	6.5° N	69.9° E	9 km
X	6.5° N	73.0° E	8 km
Y	4.2° N	68.2° E	7 km
Z	3.8° N	70.9° E	9 km

Dubyago has an unusual number of satellite craters, several of which have since been given names by the IAU. The most notable of these is Dubyago B, which is nearly attached to the southeastern rim of the main crater.

- Dubyago C — See Respighi
- Dubyago P — See Pomortsev
- Dubyago Q — See Stewart
- Dubyago S — See Liouville
- Dubyago U — See Boethius

There are five lunar domes located just to the east of Dubyago V and W.

== Gallery ==
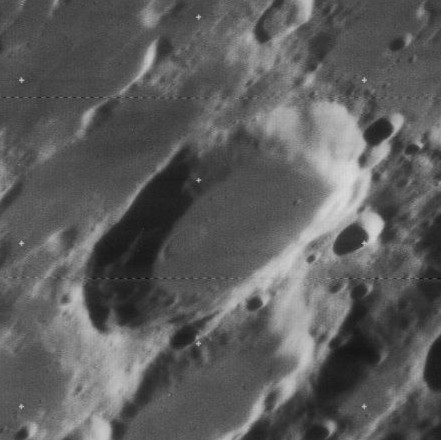
Oblique Lunar Orbiter 4 image

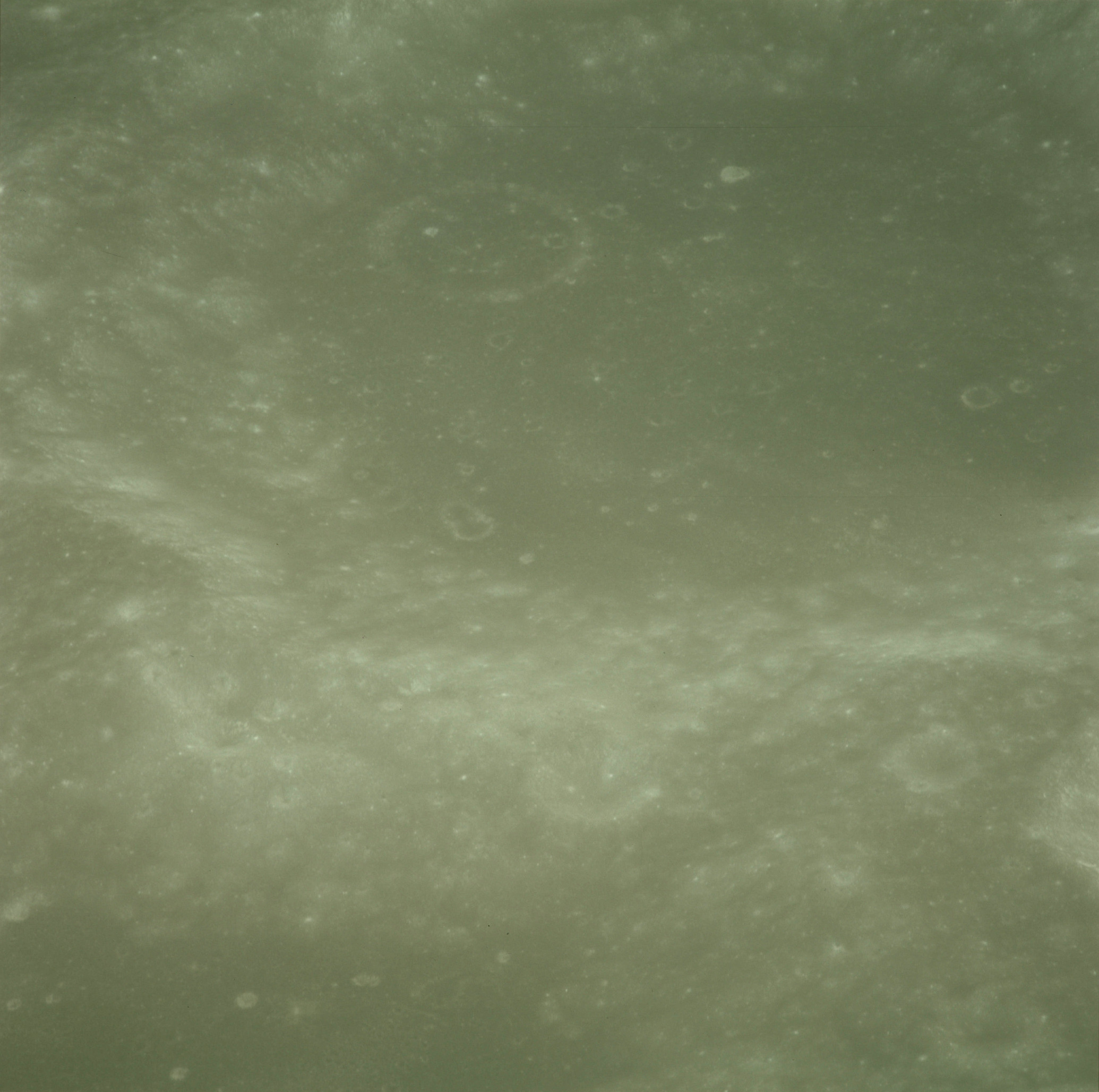
Oblique view facing northwest from Apollo 10

== See also ==
- 1167 Dubiago
