= Thomas R. McGetchin =

American geologist (1936–1979)

- Portrait c. 1970s
- Born: Thomas Richard McGetchin; July 31, 1936; La Jolla, California, U.S.
- Died: October 22, 1979 (aged 43); Hawaii, U.S.
- Known for: Apollo 17 landing site McGetchin (crater); 2891 McGetchin
- Spouse: Carle M. Pieters (m. 1978)
- Awards: NASA Exceptional Public Service Medal (1979)

Academic background
- Education: Occidental College (BA); Brown University (MA); California Institute of Technology (PhD)
- Thesis: The Moses Rock Dike: Geology, Petrology and Mode of Emplacement of a Kimberlite-Bearing Breccia Dike, San Juan County, Utah (1968)
- Doctoral advisor: Eugene Merle Shoemaker; Leon Silver

Academic work
- Discipline: Geology, planetary science
- Institutions: Air Force Institute of Technology; Massachusetts Institute of Technology; Los Alamos Scientific Laboratory; Lunar and Planetary Institute

Thomas Richard McGetchin (July 31, 1936 – October 22, 1979) was an American geologist and planetary scientist. He conducted research on volcanic eruptions, kimberlite intrusions, and the mechanics of impacts on the Moon and other bodies. He also helped select the Apollo 17 landing site.

After earning a doctorate at the California Institute of Technology in 1968, McGetchin taught geophysics at the Air Force Institute of Technology. He became an assistant professor at the Massachusetts Institute of Technology (MIT) from 1969 to 1974, and in 1975 founded the geosciences group at Los Alamos Scientific Laboratory. He directed the Lunar Science Institute from 1977 until illness forced his resignation in 1979, and the institute was renamed the Lunar and Planetary Institute during his tenure.

He collaborated with James W. Head, publishing a paper on lunar cinder cones in 1973 and a study of how ejecta thickness varies around impact craters later that year. The Lunar and Planetary Institute has since described the ejecta model as an important framework for interpreting the deposits around craters and basins. A month before his death from cancer in October 1979, he was awarded the NASA Exceptional Public Service Medal by associate administrator Thomas A. Mutch.

A year after his death, asteroid 2891 McGetchin was named after him by scientists at the Palomar Observatory. In 2026, the International Astronomical Union named a large lunar crater formed in 2024 McGetchin crater in his honor.

== Early life and education ==
McGetchin was born on July 31, 1936, in La Jolla, California. His father was a surveyor, and McGetchin helped him with fieldwork as a boy. Robin Brett wrote that a childhood spent outdoors on the California coast produced McGetchin's lasting interest in the sea and steered him toward geology. He attended Occidental College, where he majored in geology. His senior term paper on Mars kindled his interest in planetary science.

McGetchin completed a master's degree at Brown University and then a doctorate at the California Institute of Technology, awarded in 1968, where he worked under Eugene Merle Shoemaker and Leon Silver. His thesis focused on kimberlite geology in San Juan County, Utah. Brett reported that Silver regarded him as a colleague rather than a graduate student. The geologist Don Wilhelms later described him as a student and protégé of both men.

== Career ==
McGetchin was on active duty with the United States Air Force from 1967 to 1969 as an assistant professor of geophysics at the Air Force Institute of Technology. There, he encouraged several officers to write master's theses on the ballistics of volcanic ejecta, which tied their professional familiarity with ballistics and kinematics to questions of geology.

He became an assistant professor at MIT from 1969 to 1974. Students he guided there studied volcanoes in Italy, Iceland, Hawaii, and Central America using methods that included mapping, sampling, seismology, infrared imaging, and high-speed photography of ejected fragments. He also worked with an acoustic engineer to interpret a recording of an erupting volcano. Near the end of this period, he was treated for cancer for nearly a year.

In 1975, McGetchin established the Geosciences Group at Los Alamos Scientific Laboratory. The laboratory had wanted a rock mechanics group, but he persuaded it to give the group a broader mandate. He continued to publish on volcanoes, xenoliths, the cooling of plutons, and the geology of Mars while at Los Alamos. With C. D. Kolstad, he produced thermal evolution models for the Valles Caldera in connection with a hot dry rock geothermal experiment. In 1979, he and Robert B. Merrill edited a special issue of the journal Tectonophysics on plateau uplift.

=== Lunar and Planetary Institute ===
McGetchin became director of the Lunar Science Institute in 1977. Under his direction, the institute shifted away from a mainly lunar emphasis toward volcanism across the Solar System, terrestrial studies conducted from a planetary perspective, and remote sensing of Earth. Its name was changed to the Lunar and Planetary Institute in 1978. Both Brett and Wilhelms associate the change with McGetchin. He also promoted the idea of a crewed mission to Mars and published two further papers on the planet while director.

He resigned the directorship after the recurrence of cancer in 1979. He moved to Hawaii and stayed with a college friend, Tom McCord. In late September 1979, Thomas A. Mutch presented him with the NASA Exceptional Public Service Medal, which recognized his leadership in moving the agency from a lunar science focus toward a broader planetary science program.

== Research ==
=== Kimberlite and the Colorado Plateau ===
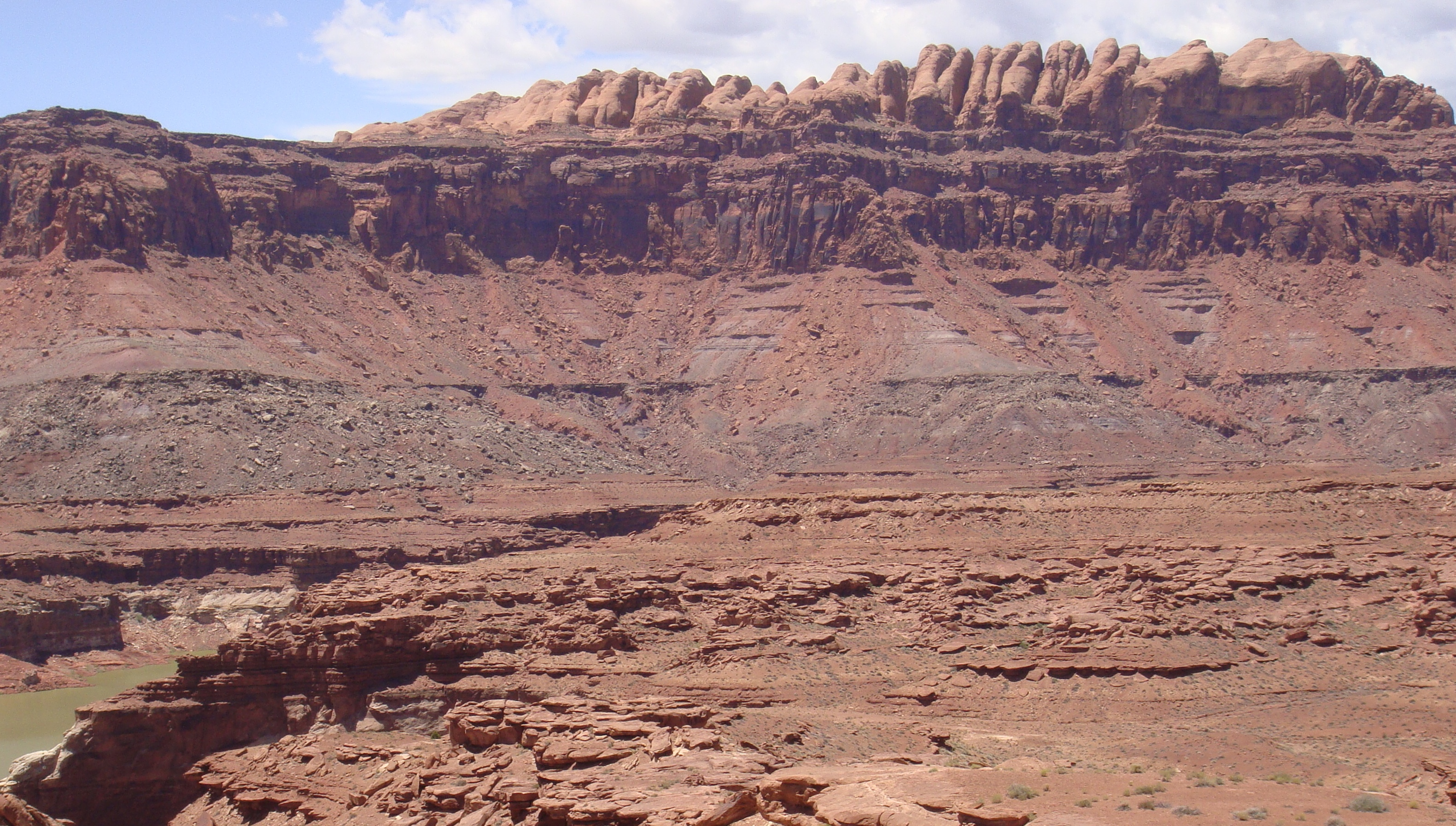
Cutler Formation in Utah

McGetchin's dissertation described the Moses Rock dike, a kimberlite-bearing breccia intrusion about four miles long in the Permian Cutler Formation of eastern Monument Valley, Utah. From the particle sizes and intricate mixing of the breccias, he concluded that the material had been emplaced as a fluidized mixture of solids and volatiles rather than as a silicate melt at the exposed level. He estimated flow speeds of 400 meters per second as the mixture reached the surface during eruption.

He interpreted crystalline fragments in the dike as samples of the vent walls and used them to infer the makeup of the Earth crust and upper mantle beneath the region. With Silver he developed this into a 1972 model of the crystalline rocks beneath the dike extending to a depth of about 200 kilometers. The dissertation also suggested that the mineral titanoclinohumite might hold much of the water in the upper mantle, an idea he published with Silver and Arthur A. Chodos in 1970. Mineral compositions from the dike were reported in American Mineralogist and, with G. W. Ullrich, he examined xenoliths in maars and diatremes and drew inferences for the Moon, Mars, and Venus.

=== Volcanology ===
McGetchin's volcanological work often applied physical modeling and measurement to active eruptions. With Mark Settle and Bernard Chouet, he modeled the growth of a cinder cone at Northeast Crater on Mount Etna in Sicily, and with Chouet and Nicholas T. Hamisevicz he used photography to analyze the ballistics of jets of ejecta at Stromboli. He later estimated the energy budget of Stromboli with Chouet. A statistical analysis of the volcano's persistent explosive activity, coauthored with Settle and considering implications for eruption prediction, appeared in 1980 after his death. Other subjects included the magmatic evolution of Hekla in Iceland, the 1973 lavas of Pacaya in Guatemala, and the acoustic noise produced by volcanoes.

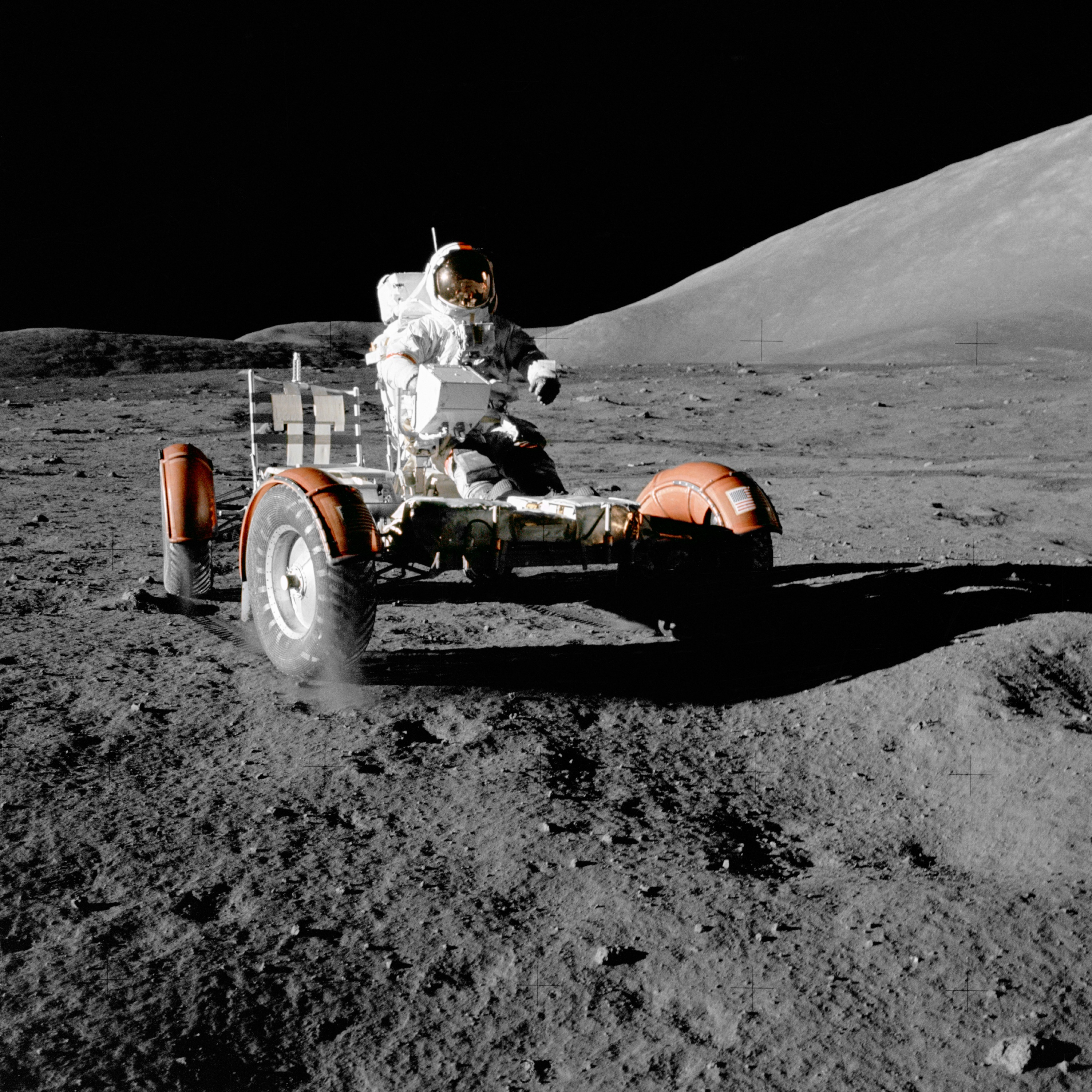
Apollo 17 lunar roving vehicle at landing site selected in part by McGetchin

=== Lunar and planetary science ===
McGetchin retained a lifelong interest in ballistics through his work on impacts and volcanic ejecta. While at MIT, he was a member of the Apollo program Field Geology Team and worked on astronaut training and mission planning. In 1970, he coauthored a paper on a crewed lunar mission to search for water in the Marius Hills, and a Science paper that used laboratory simulation to examine the impact of the Apollo 12 Lunar Module and its possible ballistic effects downrange. Wilhelms lists him with Thomas A. Mutch among the scientists who offered advice at a November 1971 meeting at Caltech where geologists stated their preferences for the Apollo 17 landing site. Wilhelms later recounted that the geology team's leader, William Muehlberger, had McGetchin and two other members told that the team no longer needed them, and remarked that McGetchin's varied research commitments kept him from concentrating on lunar studies alone.

In a 1973 paper in Science, McGetchin and Head argued that in the vacuum and reduced gravity of the Moon, pyroclastic eruptions would build low-rimmed rings rather than the high-rimmed cinder cones common on Earth, and they interpreted dark blanketing deposits in the Taurus–Littrow region, the Apollo 17 landing area, as at least partly the lunar counterparts of terrestrial cinder cones. Wilhelms lists McGetchin among scientists who suspected that dark-halo craters seen from orbit on Apollo 15 were cinder cones. Apollo 17 astronauts later found orange and black volcanic glass at Shorty crater, but Wilhelms concludes that Shorty is an impact crater that exposed a deposit far older than the crater itself, and that the mission sampled volcanic materials but no volcanic craters.

Later in 1973, McGetchin, Settle, and Head published a study of radial thickness variation in impact crater ejecta with implications for lunar basin deposits. The Lunar and Planetary Institute has called the resulting model an important framework for interpreting how ejecta are formed and distributed around craters and basins. With H. G. Hughes and F. N. App he examined the global seismic effects of basin-forming impacts.

Mars remained a recurring subject, and Brett called it his first love among planets. With David H. Johnston and M. Nafi Toksöz, he published a 1974 study of the thermal state and internal structure of Mars, and with Joseph R. Smyth a 1978 paper on possible implications of the planet's high density for the composition of its mantle.

== Personal life ==
McGetchin married the planetary scientist Carle M. Pieters in 1978. He had two children from an earlier marriage. He enjoyed sailing and the sea, and he spent time in New Mexico, including at a house in Santa Fe that he and Pieters visited frequently.

McGetchin habitually organized both scientific and household matters into matrices and graphs, described complex ideas in plain language, and liked to bring together specialists from different fields, an approach he applied at Los Alamos and at NASA in Houston. About three months before his death, he wrote down his views on life.

== Death and legacy ==
McGetchin crater captured by the Lunar Reconnaissance Orbiter in 2026

McGetchin died on October 22, 1979, in Hawaii. Memorials to him were published by the Geological Society of America, written by Brett, and in the Bulletin Volcanologique in 1980, written by John C. Eichelberger.

The asteroid 2891 McGetchin was named after him in 1980 after its discovery by scientists at the Palomar Observatory.

In 2026, the International Astronomical Union adopted the name McGetchin for a very young lunar crater. The crater is about 222 meters across and 43 meters deep, and formed between April 11 and May 22, 2024. It was found when Robert Wagner of Intuitive Machines compared images from the Lunar Reconnaissance Orbiter taken in April and May 2024 of the Moon's eastern edge. The discovery was reported in Science Advances, and scientists estimate that an impact of this size occurs on the Moon about once every 130 years.

== Works cited ==
- Brett, Robin (1985). "Memorial to Thomas R. McGetchin 1936–1979" (PDF). Geological Society of America Memorials. Vol. 16. Geological Society of America.
- Eichelberger, J. C. (September 1980). "Memorial to Thomas R. McGetchin (1936–1979)". Bulletin Volcanologique. 43 (3): 617–620. doi:10.1007/BF02597698.
- Wilhelms, Don E. (1993). "Beautiful Taurus-Littrow: A Geologist Gets a Moon Trip" (PDF). To a Rocky Moon: A Geologist's History of Lunar Exploration. University of Arizona Press. pp. 309–335.
