= Dmitry Dubyago =

Russian astronomer

- Дмитрий Дубяго
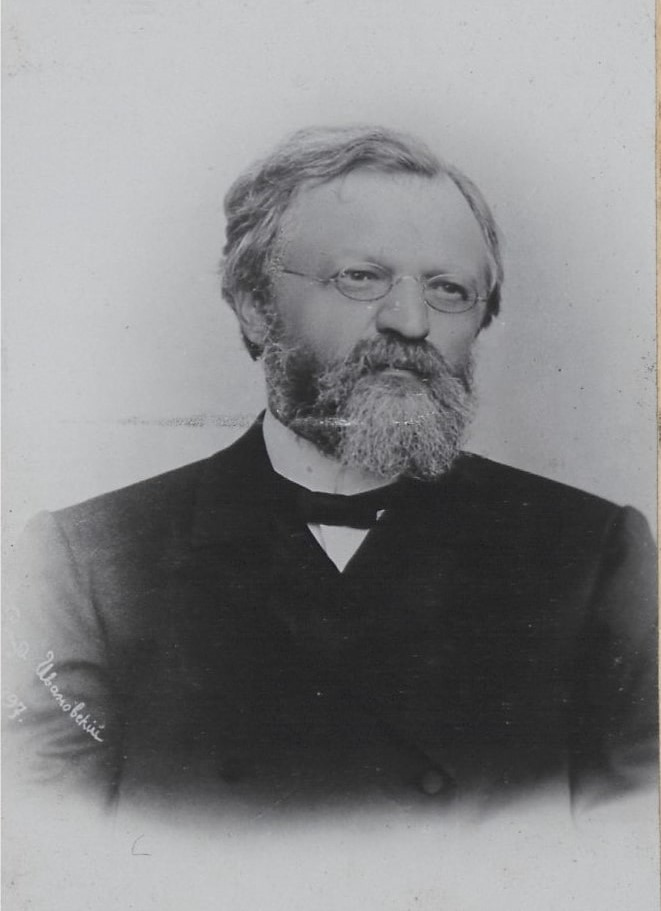
- Dubyago in 1899
- Born: September 21 (N.S. October 3), 1849
- Died: October 22, 1918 (aged 69)
- Occupations: Astronomer, astrophysicist
- Known for: The crater on the Moon is named after Dmitry Dubyago
- Children: Alexander Dubyago (son)

Dmitry Ivanovich Dubyago (Russian: Дмитрий Иванович Дубяго; September 21 (N.S. October 3), 1849 – October 22, 1918) was a Russian astronomer and expert in theoretical astrophysics, astrometry, and gravimetry.

He worked at the Pulkovo Observatory under Otto Wilhelm von Struve from 1873. He became director of the Astronomical Observatory of Kazan University in 1884 and was appointed this university's rector in 1899. In the early 1900s, he established the Engelhardt Observatory and was buried next to it. Both observatories are now World Heritage Sites.

His son Alexander Dubyago also worked at the Kazan State University. A crater on the Moon is named after them.
