= Lorenzo Respighi =

Italian mathematician and natural philosopher

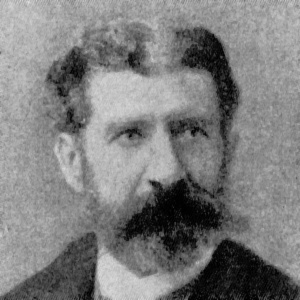
- Born: 7 October 1824; Cortemaggiore, Duchy of Parma and Piacenza
- Died: 10 December 1889 (aged 65); Rome, Kingdom of Italy
- Education: University of Bologna
- Scientific career
- Fields: Mathematics; Astronony

Lorenzo Respighi (7 October 1824 – 10 December 1889) was an Italian mathematician and natural philosopher. He was a pioneer in solar spectroscopy.

== Biography ==
Lorenzo Respighi was born in Cortemaggiore, Piacenza, to Luigi Respighi and Giuseppina Rossetti. He studied mathematics and natural philosophy, first at Parma and then at the University of Bologna, where he obtained his degree in 1847. From 1855 to 1864, he was director of the Astronomic Observatory of Bologna, and during these years he discovered three comets, #1862 IV, #1863 III and #1863 V.

After the Unification of Italy, the Italian Government imposed upon university professors the Oath of Allegiance to the House of Savoy. Respighi refused to take it. In consequence of this refusal, he had to leave the chair and the direction of the observatory.

He moved to Rome, where he obtained the position of astronomer at the Campidoglio observatory, directed by Calandrelli. In 1866, Respighi succeeded him both in the directorship of the Campidoglio observatory and in the chair of astronomy at the Sapienza University of Rome. In 1866 he made important observations on the lunar crater Linné. In 1867 and 1868, he began his celebrated studies of the scintillation of stars. In October 1869, he made the first spectroscopic observations of the border of the Sun.

Besides the aforementioned studies, Respighi carried out important research on the spectra of sunspots and on the solar corona, as well as the first systematic observations of solar prominences. Together with Schiaparelli and Secchi, Respighi was the most prominent Italian astronomer of the second half of the nineteenth century. He was a member of several Academies, including the Accademia Nazionale dei Lincei, and a foreign member of the Royal Astronomical Society. The crater Respighi on the Moon is named after him.

== Sources ==
- Righini, Guglielmo (1970). "Respighi, Lorenzo". In Charles Coulston Gillispie (ed.). Dictionary of Scientific Biography. Vol. 11. Charles Scribner's Sons. pp. 378–9.
- Bònoli, F. (2014). "Respighi, Lorenzo". Biographical Encyclopedia of Astronomers. New York, NY: Springer. doi:10.1007/978-1-4419-9917-7_1161.
- Chinnici, Ileana (2016). "RESPIGHI, Lorenzo". Dizionario Biografico degli Italiani (in Italian). Vol. 87: Renzi–Robortello. Rome: Istituto dell'Enciclopedia Italiana. ISBN 978-88-12-00032-6.
