= Mare Undarum =

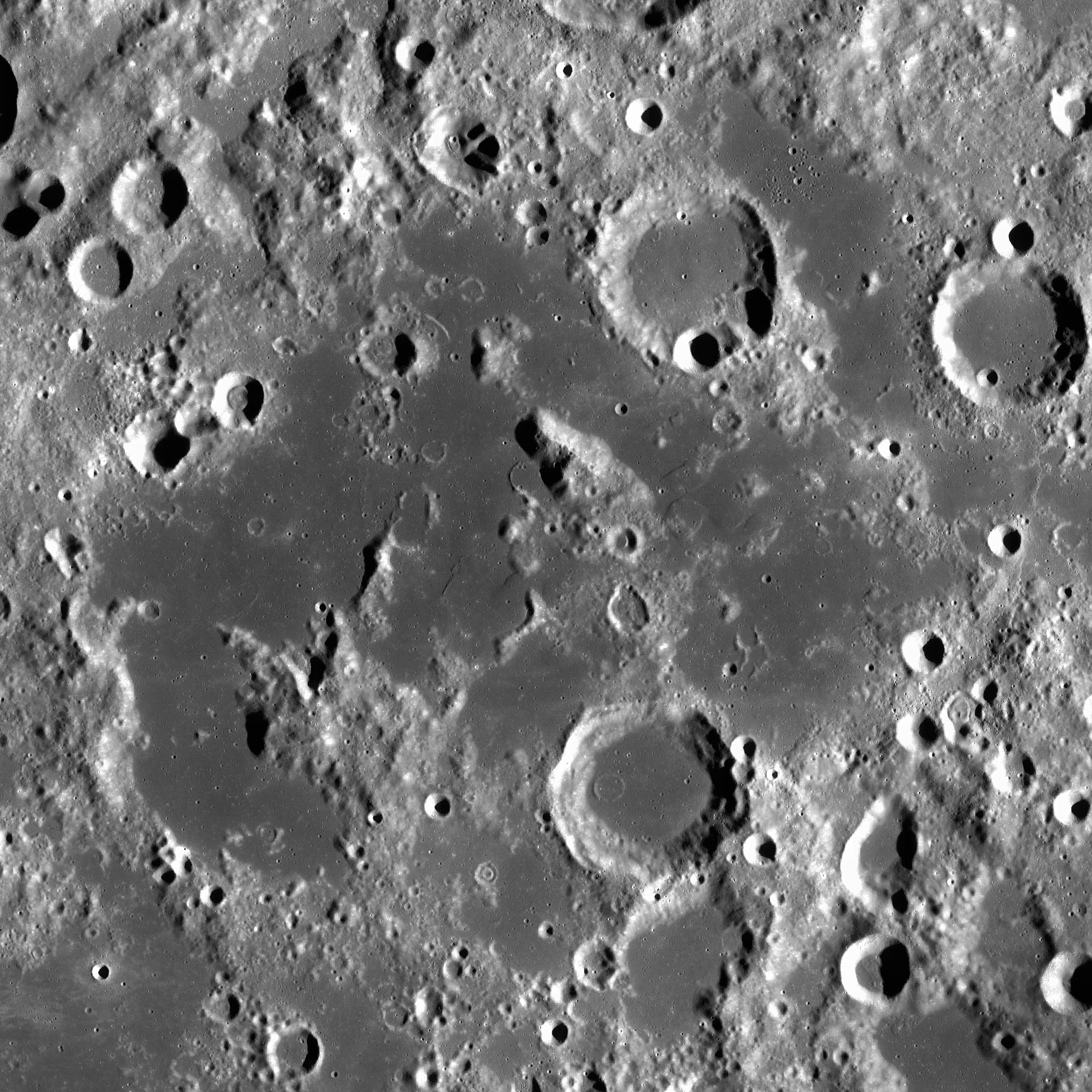
- LRO mosaic of Mare Undarum
- Coordinates: 7.49°N 68.66°E
- Diameter: 244.84 km
- Eponym: Sea of Waves

Mare Undarum /ʌnˈdɛərəm/ (Latin undārum, the "sea of waves") is a shallow, irregular lunar mare located just north of Mare Spumans on the lunar near side, between the crater Firmicus and the eastern limb. It lies within a trough between the third and fourth raised rings formed by the impact that created the Mare Crisium. The selenographic coordinates of this mare are 7.5° N, 68.7° E. It has a maximum diameter of 245 km.

There are five known lunar domes within the mare. The surrounding basin material is of the Nectarian epoch, with the mare basalt being of the Upper Imbrian epoch. The crater Dubyago can be seen on the southern edge of the mare. On the northeastern edge of the mare is the crater Condorcet P.

When Mädler observed this area in the 1830s, he noted variations in the curved dark streaks that form this mare, leading him to speculate that the changes were caused by vegetation.

== Fictional references ==
Mare Undarum was the location of the second catapult in Robert A. Heinlein's novel The Moon Is a Harsh Mistress (1966). The exact location of the catapult was kept secret and was "A matter of Lunar national security."

== Gallery ==
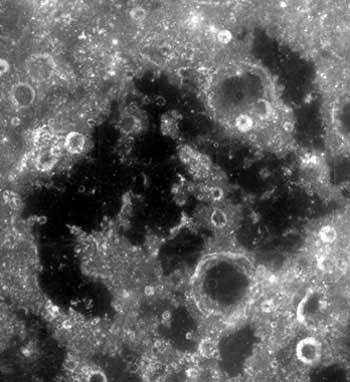
Mare Undarum from the NASA Lunar Atlas

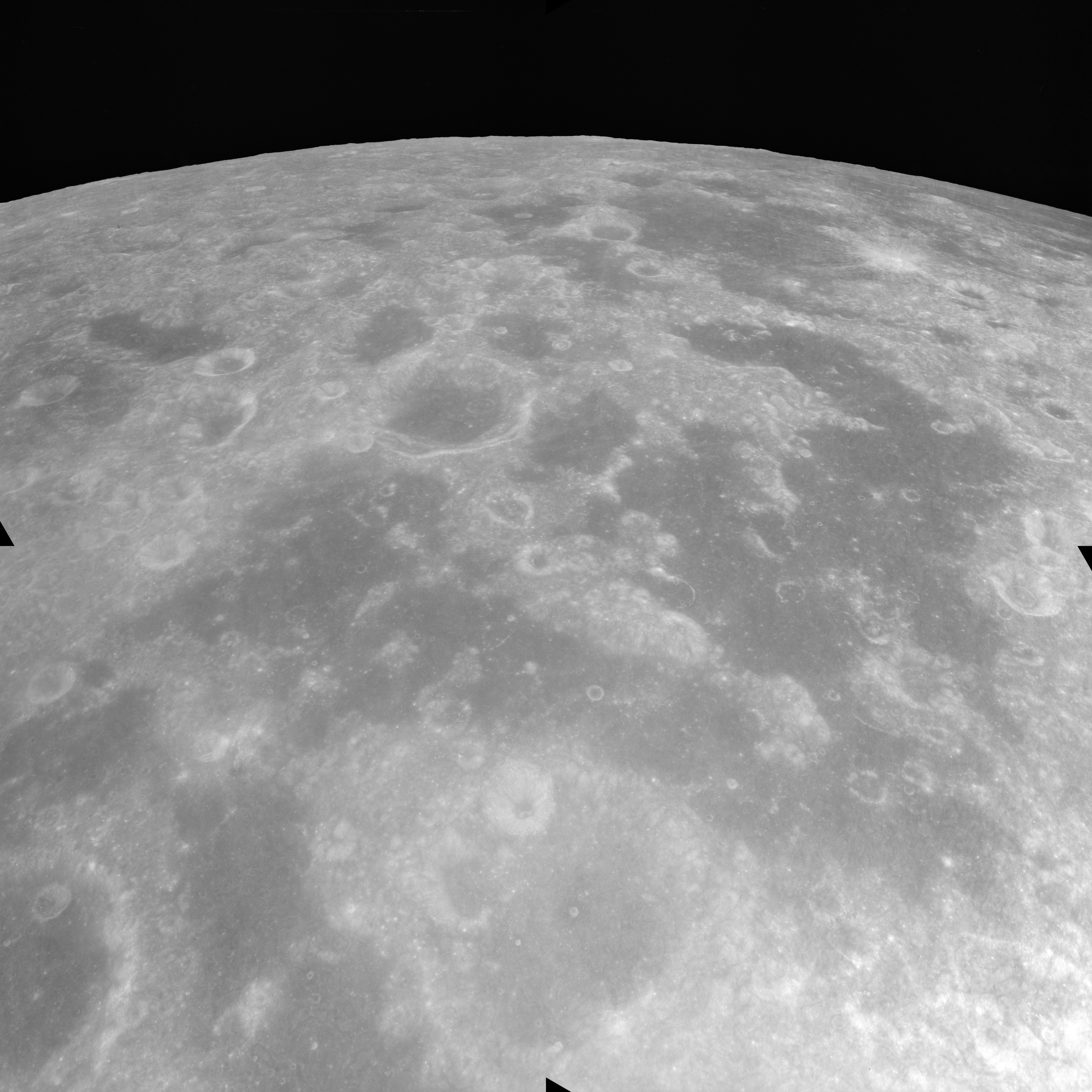
Oblique view of Mare Undarum (foreground) and Mare Spumans (upper right), facing south, from Apollo 17

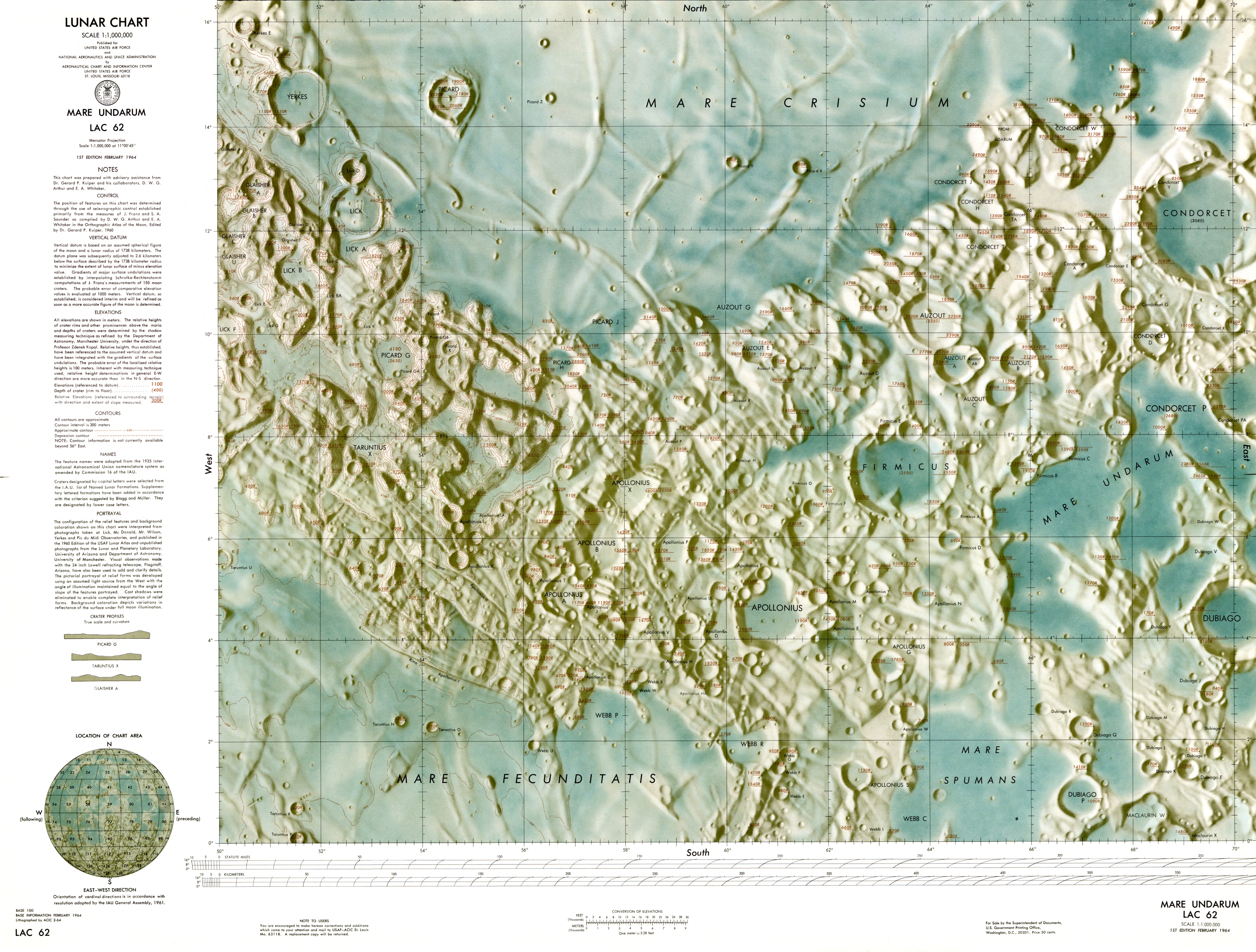
Chart of Mare Undarum and surroundings

== See also ==
- Volcanism on the Moon
