= Mare Spumans =

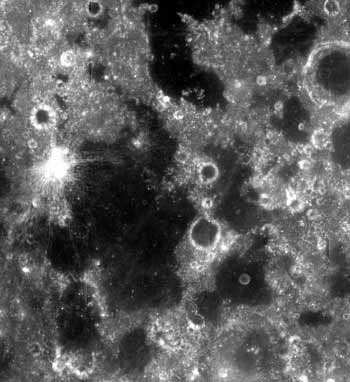
- Mare Spumans
- Coordinates: 1.3°N 65.3°E
- Diameter: 140 km
- Eponym: Foaming Sea

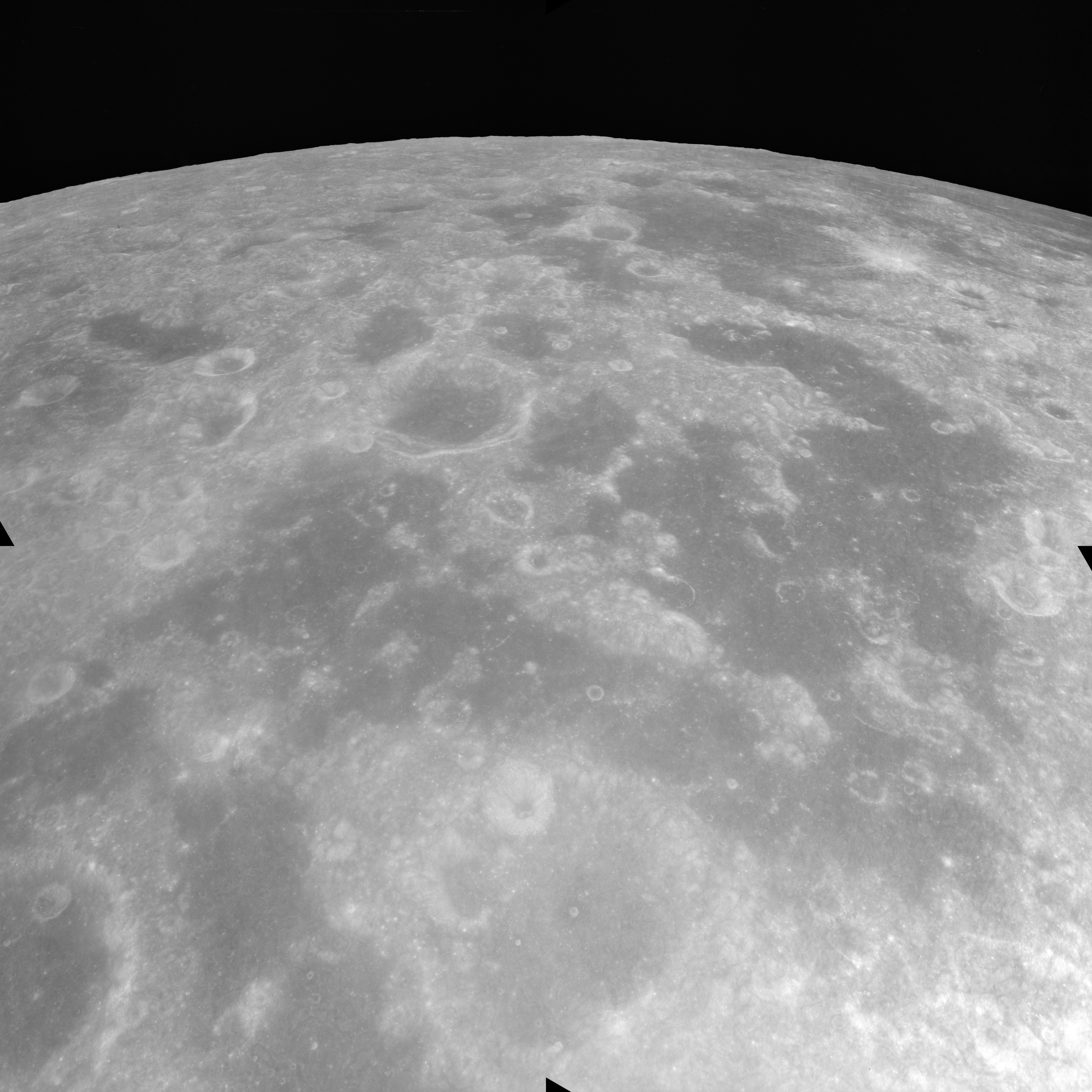
Oblique view of Mare Undarum (foreground) and Mare Spumans (upper right), facing south, from Apollo 17

Mare Spumans /ˈspjuːmənz/ (Latin spūmāns, the "foaming sea") is a lunar mare located just south of Mare Undarum on the lunar near side. It is one of the many elevated lakes contained in the Crisium basin, surrounding Mare Crisium. The surrounding basin material is of the Nectarian epoch, while the mare basalt being of the Upper Imbrian epoch. The crater Petit (formerly Apollonius W) is located on the western rim of the mare. This crater is white and surrounded by a well-defined ray system.

== Apollo Landmark ==
A small, bright-rayed crater located in northern Mare Spumans was known as landmark A-1/11 (1.7981° N, 65.0741° E). Astronaut Michael Collins tracked this landmark on revolution 4 of Apollo 11. Tracking the crater with a sextant and feeding the information into the onboard computer enhanced orbital information. Collins referred to this crater as KAMP, after his three children and wife (Kate, Ann, Michael, and Patricia).

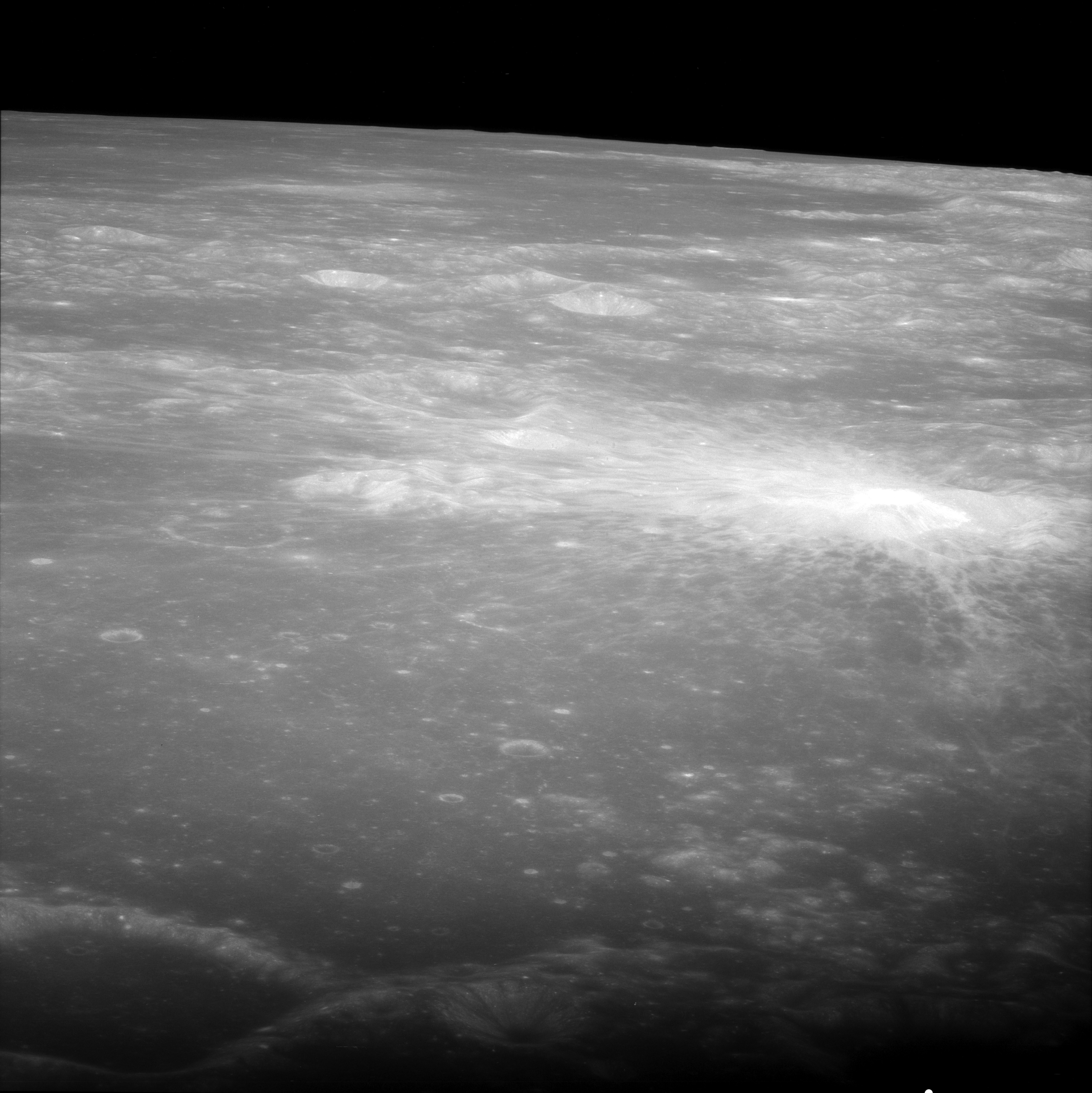
Northern Mare Spumans, with KAMP crater at left (indistinct)

== See also ==
- Volcanism on the Moon
- McGetchin (crater)
