= Alexander Dubyago =

Soviet astronomer (1903–1959)

Alexander Dmitriyevich Dubyago (Russian: Александр Дмитриевич Дубяго; December 5 (18), 1903, Kazan - October 29, 1959, Kazan) was a Soviet astronomer and expert in theoretical astrophysics, who also discovered the faint periodic comet, C/1921 H1, on April 1921. He was in charge of the Astronomical Observatory of Kazan University from 1941 until 1946.

The lunar crater Dubyago is named after him and his father, Dmitry Ivanovich Dubyago.
