= Astronomical Observatory of Kazan University =

UNESCO World Heritage Site
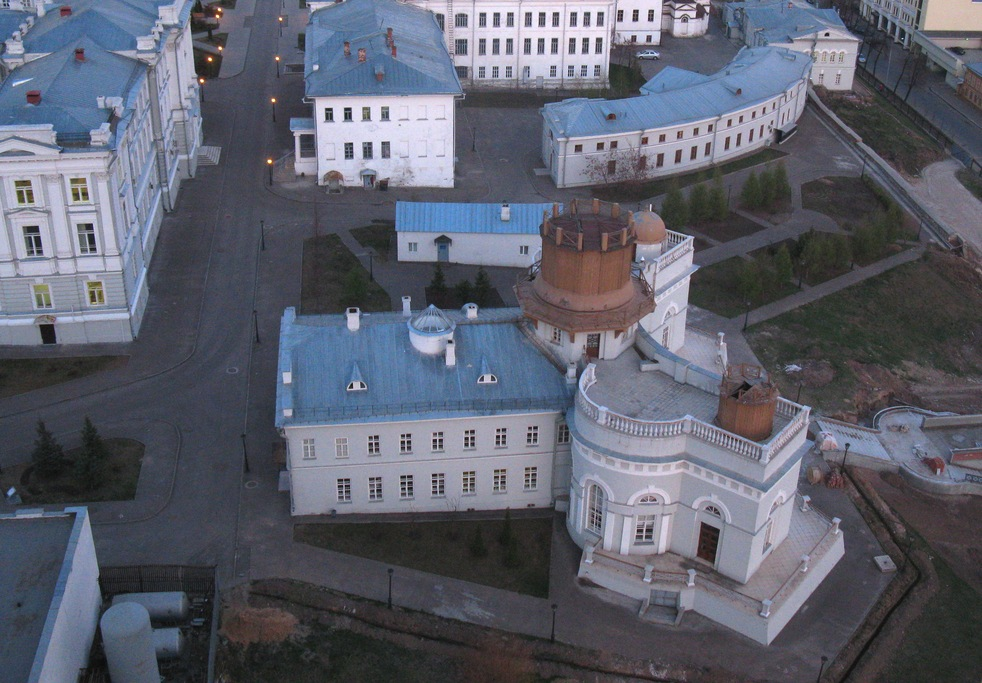

- Location within Russia
- Official name: Astronomical Observatory of Kazan University
- Location: Tatarstan, Russia
- Criteria: Cultural: (ii), (vi)
- Reference: 1678rev
- Inscription: 2023 (45th Session)
- Coordinates: 54°47′27″N 49°07′09″E

Astronomical Observatory of Kazan University is a Russian astronomical observatory located in the city of Kazan at an altitude of 75 meters above sea level. It is affiliated with the Department of Astronomy of Kazan University, founded in 1810 by Joseph Johann von Littrow.

In September 2023, this observatory and the Engelhardt Observatory were added to the UNESCO World Heritage List (although ICOMOS did not recommend inscribing them).

== History ==
The Department of Astronomy of the Imperial Kazan University was founded in 1810 by Joseph Johann Litrow. On November 11, 1814, observations began at a small observatory (temporary construction) above a stone gatehouse in the university botanical garden. At the time, it was the easternmost observatory in Europe.

In 1822 the observatory was temporarily placed in a wooden gallery (part of I. M. Simonov's apartment). In 1827 the university yard was chosen as the permanent place of the observatory, and in 1833 the construction of the observatory building began. In 1835 a 23-cm (9-inch) refractor was ordered from Fraunhofer's workshop.

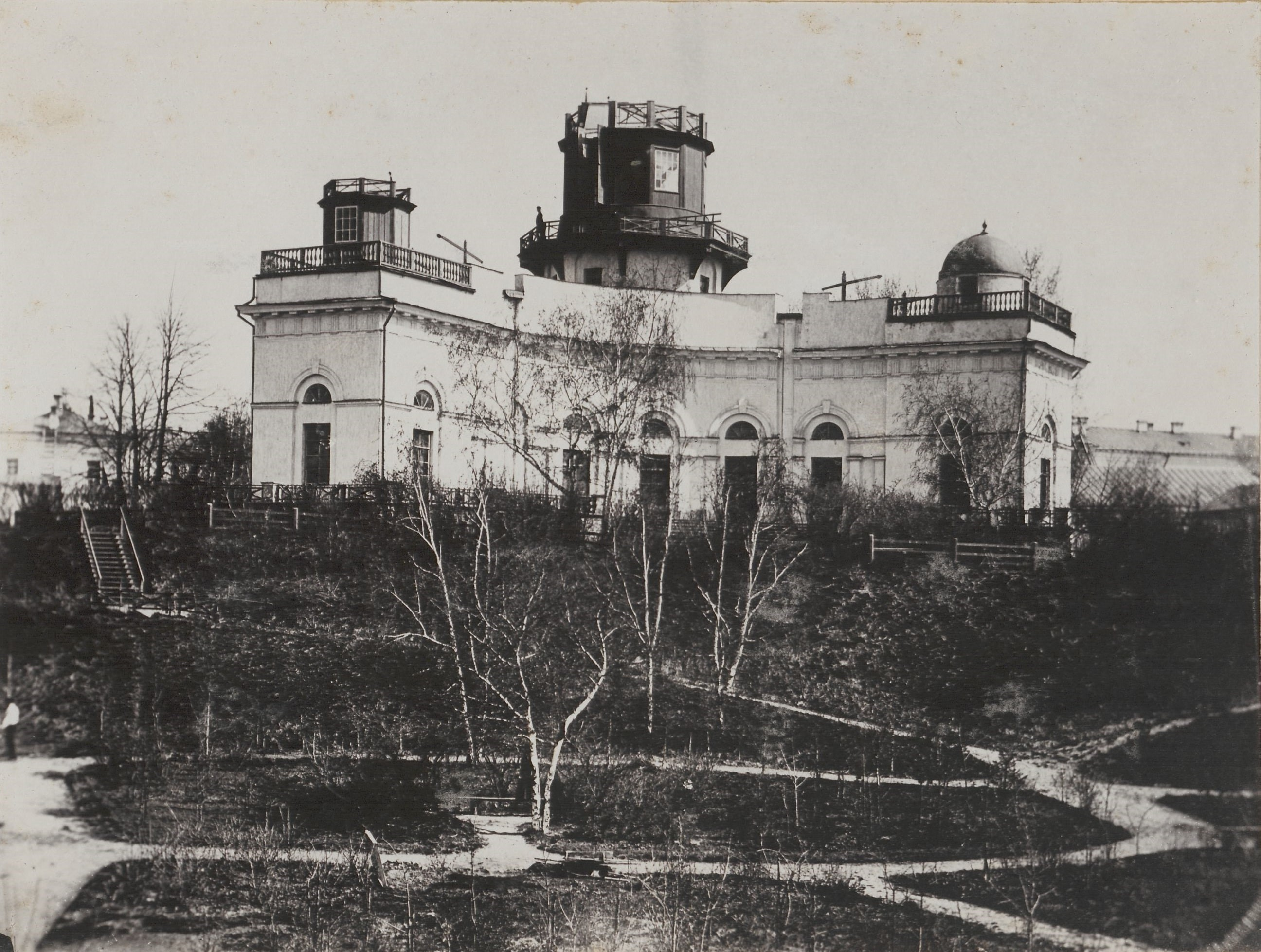
A photograph taken before 1908

In 1837 the permanent observatory building was completed, and in June of that year the first observations were made in it. In 1838, a 9-inch refractor was installed in the fully movable main tower. The official date of birth of the University Astronomical Observatory was April 13, 1838, when permanent observations (on the Vienna Meridian Circle) began in the new observatory building.

On February 23, 1885, a time service was established: a clock showing the exact Kazan mean time was exhibited in the window of the department.

From 1925 to 1946, along with the Department of Astronomy, there was the Department of Geodesy, from 1937 called the Department of Geodesy and Gravimetry. It was headed at different times by K. K. Dubrovsky (1925–1931), A. A. Yakovkin (1931–1937), I. A. Dyukov (1937–1941), A. D. Dubyago (1941–1946). The Department of Astronomy since the late 1930s was called the Department of Astrometry (heads V. A. Baranov (1937–1941), I. A. Dyukov (1941–1947)).

In addition, from 1939 to 1947 and then from 1951 to 1954 there was the Department of Astrophysics under the direction of D. Y. Martynov, and since 1945 - the Department of Theoretical Astronomy under the direction of A. D. Dubyago. In 1947, due to the insufficient number of students, four astronomy departments were merged into one - the Department of Astronomy under the general direction of Prof. I. A. Dyukov.

On May 4, 1983, in Kazan, V. Kapkov made a successful observation of the occultation of an 8.6 magnitude star by asteroid 2 Pallas. This was the first reliable observation of an asteroid occulting a star on the territory of Russia and the fourth within the borders of the USSR.

On September 19, 2023, the observatory was inscribed on the UNESCO World Heritage List together with the Engelhardt Observatory (located 18 km west of Kazan).
