= Ileana Chinnici =

Italian historian of astronomy

- Education: University of Palermo, 1992 (degree in physics)
- Occupations: Historian of astronomy Book author, Biographer
- Employer(s): Paris Observatory, Palermo Astronomical Observatory
- Known for: Research and adjunct astronomer

Ileana Chinnici is an Italian historian of astronomy, book author, and biographer, whose biography of Angelo Secchi won the 2021 Osterbrock Book Prize of the American Astronomical Society.

== Education and career ==
Chinnici earned a degree in physics in 1992 from the University of Palermo with a dissertation concerning Italian astronomer Pietro Tacchini, supervised by Giorgia Foderà. After working as a secondary school teacher, and a visiting position at the Paris Observatory, she joined the Palermo Astronomical Observatory as a research fellow in 1995, and became curator of the observatory's museum of astronomy in 1996. Since 2004 she has been a research astronomer at the observatory, in charge of museum activities. She has also been an adjunct astronomer with the Vatican Observatory since approximately 2009.

== Books ==
Chinnici's books include:

- L'osseruatorio astronomico di Palermo, la storia e gli strumenti (with Giorgia Foder Serio, Flaccovio Ed., 1997)
- La carte du ciel: Correspondence inédite conservée dans les archives de l’Observatoire de Paris (edited, Paris Observatory, 1999)
- Alle origini dell'astrofisica italiana: Il carteggio Secchi–Tacchini 1861–1877 (with Antonella Gasperini, Fond. Giorgio Ronchi, 2013)
- Merz Telescopes: A global heritage worth preserving (edited, Springer, 2017)
- Decoding the Stars: A Biography of Angelo Secchi, Jesuit and Scientist (Brill, 2019)
- Angelo Secchi and Nineteenth Century Science: The Multidisciplinary Contributions of a Pioneer and Innovator (edited with Guy Consolmagno, Springer, 2021)
