= Artemyev =

Artemyev or Artemiev (Russian: Артемьев) and Artemyeva / Artemieva (Russian: Артемьева; feminine) is a Russian surname, derived from the given name Artemy. Notable people with the surname include:

- Eduard Artemyev (1937–2022), Russian composer
- Igor Artemyev (born 1961), Russian politician and government official
- Irina Artemieva, Russian-German geophysicist
- Maria Artemieva (born 1993), Russian figure skater
- Natalia Artemieva (born 1959), Russian-American planetary scientist
- Oleg Artemyev (born 1970) Russian cosmonaut
- Valentina Artemyeva (born 1986), Russian breaststroke swimmer
- Vasily Artemyev (born 1987), Russian rugby union wing
- Vladimir Artemyev (1885–1962), Soviet rocket scientist
- Vladislav Artemiev (born 1998), Russian chess grandmaster and prodigy

== See also ==
- Artem'ev (crater)
