= 1316 Kasan =

Mars-crossing eccentric asteroid

Discovery
- Discovered by: G. Neujmin
- Discovery site: Simeiz Obs.
- Discovery date: 17 November 1933

Designations
- Named after: Kazan/Engelhardt Observatory (Russian city and observatory)
- Alternative designations: 1933 WC · 1978 WK_{14}
- Minor planet category: Mars-crosser · (inner)

Orbital characteristics
- Epoch 4 September 2017 (JD 2458000.5)
- Uncertainty parameter 0
- Observation arc: 83.36 yr (30,449 days)
- Aphelion: 3.1769 AU
- Perihelion: 1.6498 AU
- Semi-major axis: 2.4133 AU
- Eccentricity: 0.3164
- Orbital period (sidereal): 3.75 yr (1,369 days)
- Mean anomaly: 145.60°
- Mean motion: 0° 15^{m} 46.44^{s} / day
- Inclination: 23.930°
- Longitude of ascending node: 238.25°
- Argument of perihelion: 148.37°

Physical characteristics
- Dimensions: 6.86±0.69 km 7.13 km (calculated)
- Synodic rotation period: 5.82±0.01 h 5.83±0.01 h (Note: Lightcurve plot of 1316 Kasan, Palmer Divide Observatory, Brian D. Warner (2004). Summary figures at the LCDB)
- Geometric albedo: 0.20 (assumed); 0.216±0.043
- Spectral type: SMASS = Sr · S
- Absolute magnitude (H): 13.10 · 13.2 · 13.30±0.47

1316 Kasan, provisional designation 1933 WC, is a stony asteroid and sizable Mars-crosser on an eccentric orbit from the asteroid belt, approximately 7 kilometers in diameter. It was discovered on 17 November 1933, by Soviet astronomer Grigory Neujmin at the Simeiz Observatory on the Crimean peninsula. The asteroid was named for the city of Kazan, Russia, and its nearby Engelhardt Observatory (Kazan Observatory).

== Orbit and classification ==
Kasan is a Mars-crossing asteroid, a dynamically unstable group between the main-belt and the near-Earth populations, crossing the orbit of Mars at 1.666 AU.

The asteroid is on an eccentric orbit around the Sun, at a distance of 1.6–3.2 AU once every 3 years and 9 months (1,369 days; semi-major axis of 2.41 AU). Its orbit has an eccentricity of 0.32 and an inclination of 24° with respect to the ecliptic. The body's observation arc begins at Heidelberg Observatory on 20 November 1933, three days after its official discovery observation at Simeiz Observatory.

== Physical characteristics ==
In the SMASS classification, Kasan is an Sr-subtype that transitions from the common S-type to the uncommon R-type asteroids.

=== Rotation period ===
In November 2008, a rotational lightcurve of Kasan was obtained from photometric observations by American astronomer Robert Stephens. Lightcurve analysis gave a well-defined rotation period of 5.82 hours with a brightness variation of 0.25 magnitude (U=3). Previously, a period of 5.83 hours with an amplitude of 0.26 magnitude was measured by Brian Warner at the Palmer Divide Observatory in September 2004 (U=2+).

=== Diameter and albedo ===
According to the survey carried out by the NEOWISE mission of NASA's Wide-field Infrared Survey Explorer, Kasan measures 6.86 kilometers in diameter and its surface has an albedo of 0.216. The Collaborative Asteroid Lightcurve Link assumes a standard albedo for stony asteroids of 0.20 and calculates a diameter of 7.13 kilometers based on an absolute magnitude of 13.1.

This makes Kazan one of the largest mid-sized Mars-crossing asteroids comparable with 1065 Amundsenia (9.75 km), 1139 Atami (9 km), 1474 Beira (8.73 km), 1508 Kemi (17 km), 1011 Laodamia (7.5 km), 1727 Mette (est. 9 km), 1131 Porzia (7.13 km), 1235 Schorria (est. 9 km), 985 Rosina (8.18 km), 1310 Villigera (15.24 km) and 1468 Zomba (7 km), but smaller than the largest members of this dynamical group, namely, 132 Aethra, 2204 Lyyli and 512 Taurinensis.

== Naming ==
This minor planet was named after the city of Kazan, the capital of the Republic of Tatarstan, Russia. It was also named in honor of the nearby Kazan Observatory (Engelhardt Observatory). The official naming citation was mentioned in The Names of the Minor Planets by Paul Herget in 1955 (H 120).
