= Kibalchich =

Kibalchich (transliteration from Russian) or Kybalchych (transliteration from Ukrainian) is surname of a South Slavic origin Кибалчић/Кибальчич/Kibalčič/Кибалчич. Notable people with the surname include:

- Nikolai Kibalchich (1850–1881), a Russian/Ukrainian scientist, revolutionary, terrorist, pioneer of rocketry
- Victor Kibalchich (1890–1947), better known as Victor Serge, a Russian anarchist and communist
- Vlady Kibalchich Rusakov (1920 – 2005), Russian-Mexican painter
- Nadiia Kybalchych (1878-1914), Ukrainian writer

== See also ==
- Kibal'chich (crater), named after Nikolai Kibalchich
