= Tsander =

Tsander can refer to:

- Friedrich Zander (1887–1933), Soviet rocket engineer
- Tsander (crater), a Moon crater named after Friedrich Zander
- Volha Tsander (born 1976), Belarusian hammer thrower
