= Fyodor Bredikhin =

Russian astronomer

- Фёдор Бредихин
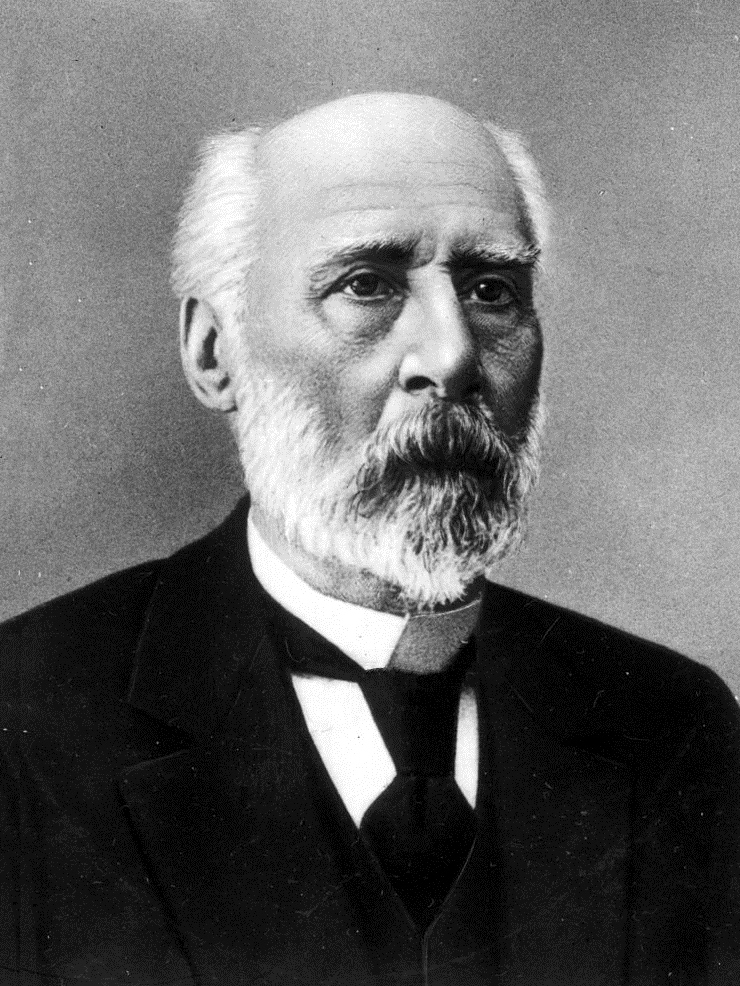
- Bredikhin c. 1890s
- Born: 26 November 1831; Mykolaiv, Russian Empire
- Died: 1 May 1904 (aged 72); Saint Petersburg, Russian Empire
- Alma mater: Imperial Moscow University (1855)
- Scientific career
- Fields: Astronomy
- Workplaces: Imperial Moscow University; Pulkovo Observatory

Fyodor Aleksandrovich Bredikhin (Russian: Фёдор Александрович Бредихин, 8 December [O.S. 26 November] 1831 – 14 May [O.S. 1 May] 1904) was a Russian astronomer. His surname is sometimes given as Bredichin in the literature, and non-Russian sources sometimes render his first name as Theodor.

== Career ==
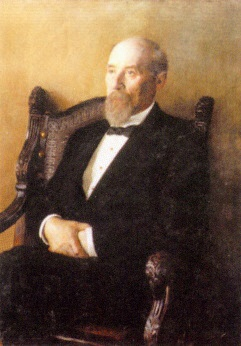
Fyodor Bredikhin (1897)

In 1857 he joined the staff of the observatory at Moscow University, becoming its director in 1873. In 1890 he became director of Pulkovo Observatory (until 1894) and in the same year became a member of the Russian Academy of Sciences.

He studied the theory of comet tails, and also studied meteors and meteor showers.

== Legacy ==
The asteroid 786 Bredichina and the crater Bredikhin on the Moon are named after him. The F. A. Bredikhin Prize is awarded by the Russian Academy of Sciences.

== Bibliography ==
- Imperial Moscow University: 1755-1917: encyclopedic dictionary. Moscow: Russian political encyclopedia (ROSSPEN). 2010. pp. 95–96. ISBN 978-5-8243-1429-8 – via A. Andreev, D. Tsygankov.
