= Jean Jacques Raimond Jr. =

Dutch astronomer

Jean Jacques Raimond Jr. (13 April 1903, in The Hague – 3 December 1961) was a Dutch astronomer.

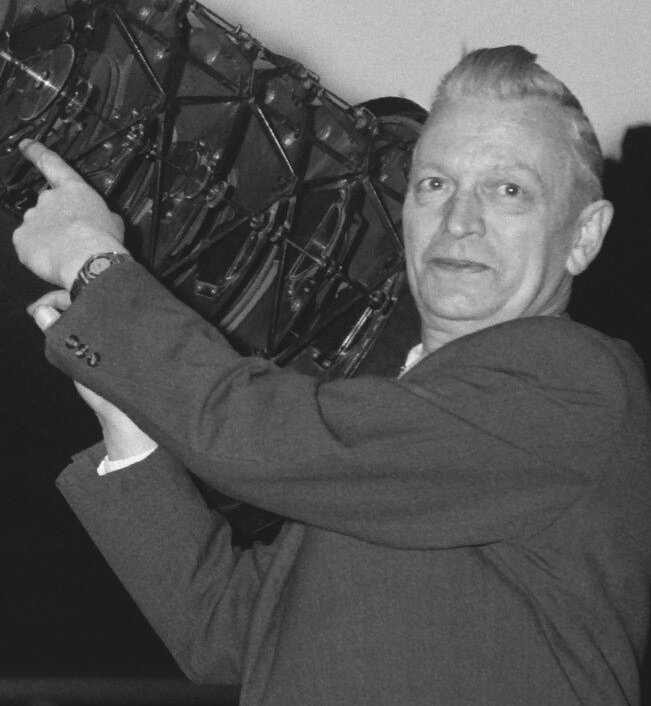
Jean Jacques Raimond, 1959

Raimond was the son of Jean Jacques Raimond Sr., furniture maker in The Hague, and Tetje van der Werf. He studied astronomy at the universities of Leiden and Groningen. He obtained his PhD at the latter as a student of Jacobus Kapteyn, defending the dissertation The Coefficient of Differential Galactic Absorption.

He became the director of the Zeiss Planetarium in The Hague at its opening in 1934. This was the first planetarium installed outside Germany. Here he had a strong influence on the popularization of astronomy. In 1944 he became the president of the 'Nederlandse Vereniging voor Weer- en Sterrenkunde' (NVWS, Netherlands Association for Meteorology and Astronomy) after serving as a board member. From 1938 until his death in 1961, he published annual issues of the popular series 'Sterrengids', an astronomical almanac.

The asteroid 1450 Raimonda is named after him, as is the crater Raimond on the Moon. His son Ernst became a radio astronomer.

In 1955 a local Dutch astronomy society was named after him. This society still exists albeit under a different name: Triangulum. Recently it celebrated its 50th year of existence.
