= Engelʹgardt (crater) =

Crater on the Moon

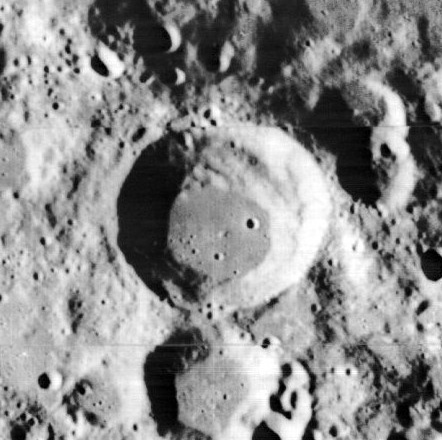
- Lunar Orbiter 1 image
- Coordinates: 5.39°N 159.47°W
- Diameter: 43.51 km (27.04 mi)
- Colongitude: 160° at sunrise
- Formation: Early Imbrian
- Eponym: Vasilij P. Engelʹgardt

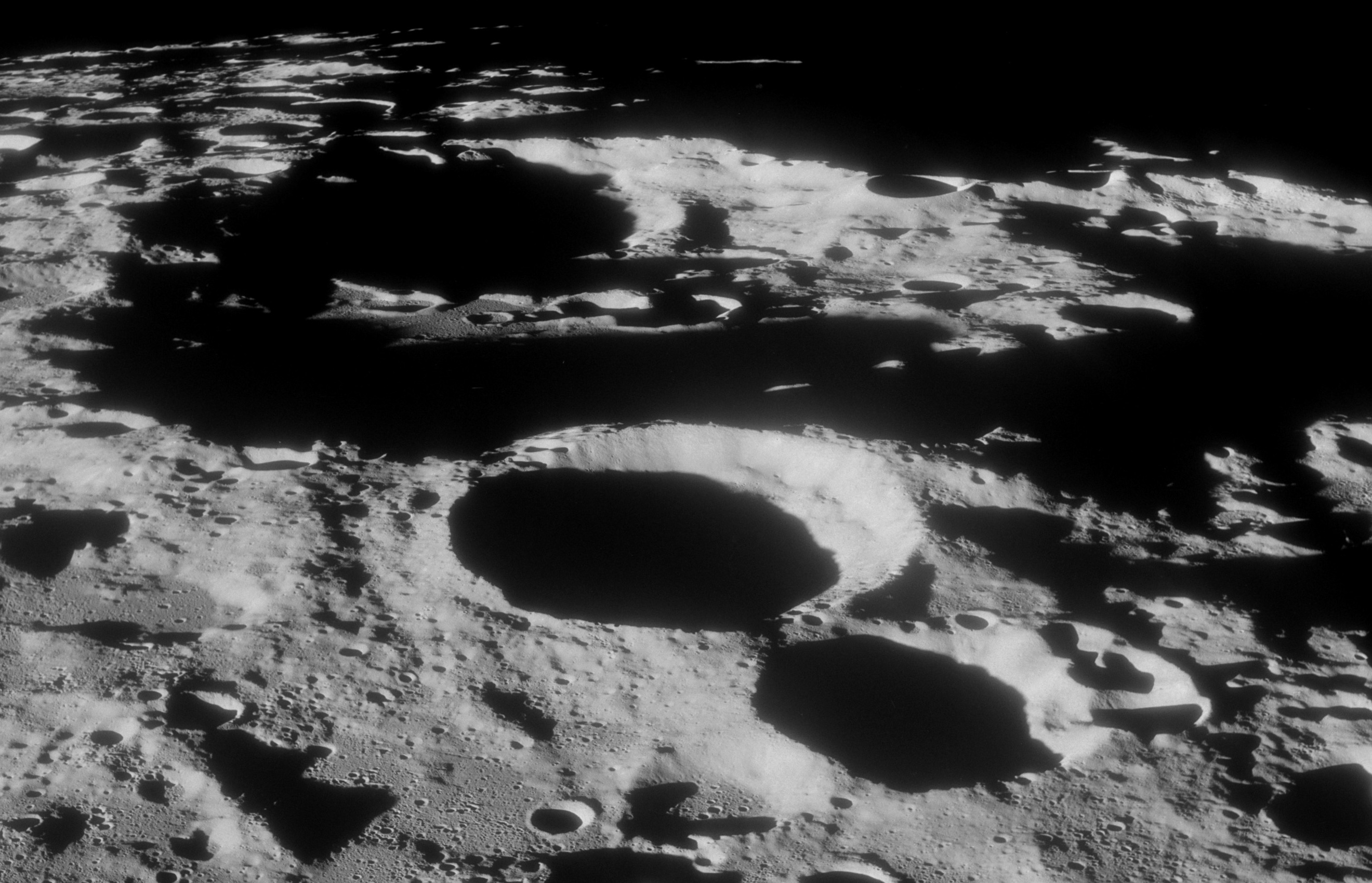
Oblique view from Apollo 11, near the terminator

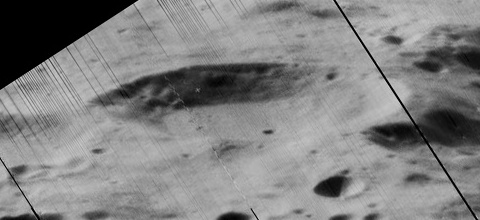
Oblique Lunar Orbiter 5 image

Engelʹgardt, or Engelhardt, is a lunar impact crater on the far side of the Moon. Engelʹgardt lies on the southern margin of the Dirichlet-Jackson Basin. It is located to the north of Korolev, a huge walled plain. The satellite crater Engelʹgardt B is attached to the north rim of this crater, and is actually a much larger formation with a diameter of 163 km. To the west-northwest is the crater Lebedinskiy.

This crater dates to the Early Imbrian period on the lunar geologic timescale. It is a circular formation with a rim that has been only mildly eroded. The material on the inner sides has slid down to form piles of scree along the base. The inner wall is narrowed to the south, where the satellite crater Engelʹgardt N lies adjacent to the edge. The highest-elevation point on the entire surface of the Moon, 10,786 m (35,387 ft) above the mean lunar elevation, is located on the east rim of Engelʹgardt Crater. Less than a crater diameter to the east-southeast is a small crater with a high albedo surrounded by a skirt of light surface. This skirt reaches to the edge of Engelʹgardt's rim.

This formation is named after Russian astronomer Vasilij Pavlovich Engelʹgardt (1828-1915). Its designation was formally adopted by the International Astronomical Union in 1970.

== Satellite craters ==
By convention these features are identified on lunar maps by placing the letter on the side of the crater midpoint that is closest to Engelʹgardt.

Engelʹgardt	Latitude	Longitude	Diameter
B	8.3° N	157.7° W	136 km
C	10.1° N	156.9° W	49 km
J	2.7° N	155.4° W	19 km
K	2.4° N	157.8° W	18 km
N	4.4° N	159.3° W	28 km
R	4.4° N	162.0° W	15 km
