= Vasily Engelhardt =

Baltic-German aristocrat and astronomer (1828–1915)

Vasily von Engelhardt
- Василий Энгельгардт
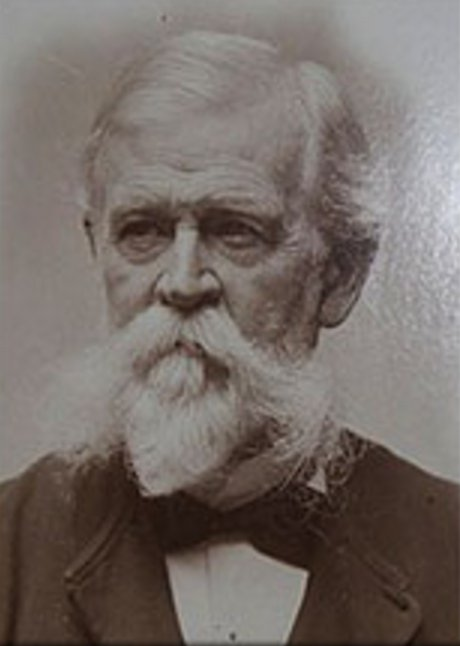
- Born: 29 July 1828; Kustovichi, Russian Empire
- Died: 17 May 1915 (aged 86); Dresden, German Empire
- Citizenship: Russian, German
- Education: St. Petersburg School of Law (1847)

Vasily Pavlovich von Engelhardt (Russian: Василий Павлович Энгельгардт; 29 July 1828 – 17 May 1915) was a Russian astronomer, landowner and public figure. He helped establish the Engelhardt Observatory in Tatarstan, a World Heritage Site.

== Early life ==
Engelhardt came from the Smolensk branch of the Engelhardt family. His grandfather married one of Prince Potemkin's nieces. After the prince died childless, she inherited huge wealth and landed property, especially in Ukraine. Taras Shevchenko, a noted poet, was one of his father's serfs.

Vasily graduated from the St. Petersburg School of Law in 1847, then served in the 1st and 5th departments of the Senate. In 1853 he left government service and devoted himself to studying astronomy.

== Astronomer ==
In 1875, Engelhardt settled in Dresden and built himself an observatory with his own money, where he worked alone without assistants until 1897. His main work was researching comets, asteroids, nebulae, and star clusters.

In 1870 he completed the observation of 50 comets and 70 asteroids. Turning to star clusters, in 1883 he completed a catalog of more than 400 nebulae. Beginning in 1886, he observed 829 stars in Bradley's directory to determine if they had companion stars.

In the late 1890s, deteriorating health forced Engelhardt to give up personal observing, and he gave all his equipment to Kazan University, of which his friend and fellow astronomer Dmitri Dubyago was rector. The university built an observatory to house the equipment, which was opened in 1901 (see Engelhardt Observatory). Until the end of his life, Engelhardt took an active part in the construction and organization of the new observatory, and in his will gave Kazan University all his money and property, to be used for the development and maintenance of the observatory. As a result, his remains were transferred in 2014 from Dresden to the grounds of the Engelhardt observatory.

Engelhardt was awarded an honorary doctorate by Kazan University in 1889, and in 1890 he was made a corresponding member of the Russian Academy of Sciences.

== Cultural activities ==
For most of his life, Engelhardt took an active interest in Russian history, gathering materials and donating them to Russian collections.

Engelhardt was a close friend of the composer Mikhail Glinka. When Glinka died in Berlin in 1857, Engelhardt arranged the transfer of his remains home to Tikhvin. Engelhardt also sent Glinka's collection of manuscripts to St. Petersburg, where the Glinka Public Library was founded, and published the scores of Glinka's operas and symphonic works. Later, at the request of the critic Vladimir Stasov (a law school classmate), Engelhardt published his memoirs of Glinka and the composer Alexander Dargomyzhsky.

In the late 1890s, moving away from astronomical research, Engelhardt began a collection of material on Suvorov's campaign in Switzerland, which he donated to the Suvorov Museum in St. Petersburg in commemoration of the 100th anniversary of the 1812 war. Engelhardt's efforts made a significant contribution to perpetuating the memory of the Russian campaign in Switzerland.

Engelhardt's correspondence with leading cultural figures (Glinka, Stasov, Franz Liszt, G. Bulow) is considered of historical value.

== Eponymy ==
By decision of the XIV Congress of the International Astronomical Union, the Moon crater Engel'gardt was named in Engelhardt's honor.

== Publications ==
- Observations astronomiques, faites par B. d' Engelhardt a son Observatoire a Dresde (Dresden, 1886-1895) (in French)
- Memories of Mikhail Glinka (in Russian)

== Sources ==
- "Энгельгардт, Василий Павлович" . Brockhaus and Efron Encyclopedic Dictionary (in Russian). 1906.
