= Raimond (crater) =

Crater on the Moon

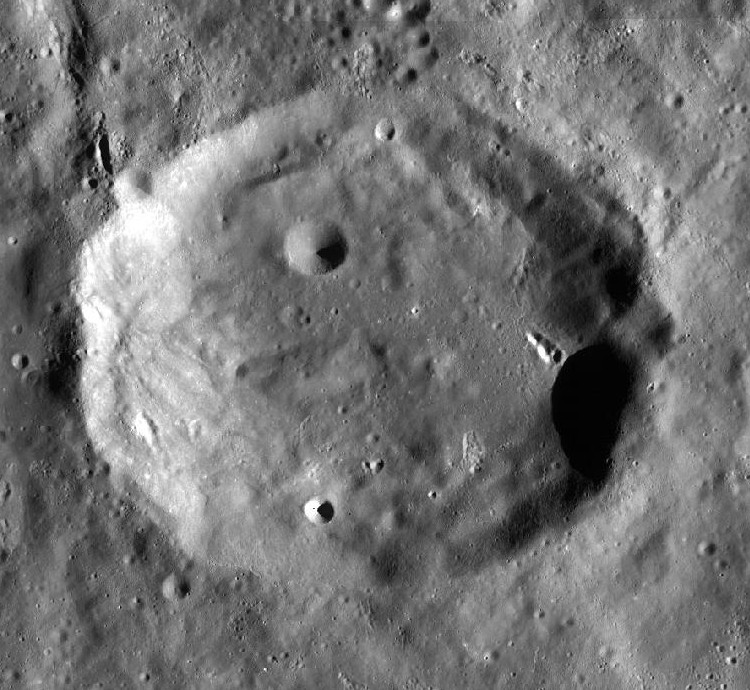
- LRO WAC mosaic
- Coordinates: 14.78°N 159.63°W
- Diameter: 68.37 km (42.48 mi)
- Depth: unknown
- Colongitude: 160° at sunrise
- Eponym: Jean J. Raimond, Jr.

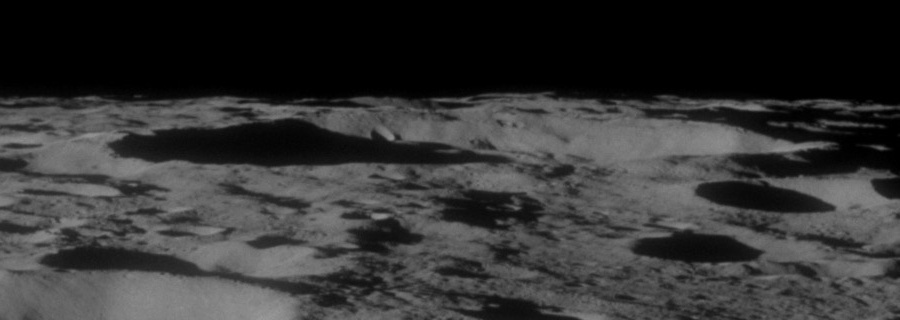
Highly oblique view of Raimond from Apollo 11

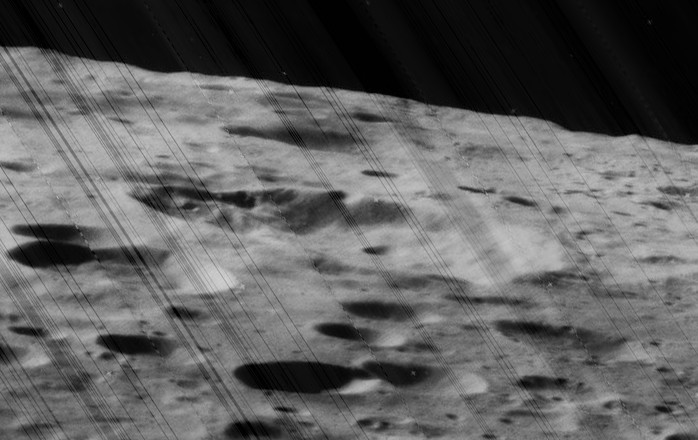
Another oblique view from Lunar Orbiter 5

Raimond is a lunar impact crater that lies on the Moon's far side. It lies near the center of the Dirichlet-Jackson Basin. Less than one crater diameter to the northeast is Bredikhin, and farther to the west is McMath. To the north-northwest lies the prominent crater Jackson, which is surrounded by a large ray system. Raimond is almost completely covered by this ray material, and a pair of prominent rays cross the northeastern and southwestern portions of the crater.

This crater is slightly elongated along the east–west axis, giving is a slightly oblong appearance. The rim edge is moderately worn, although no significant impacts lie across the edge. The interior is relatively featureless, with only a few small craterlets and the ray material from Jackson crater to mark the surface. The infrared spectrum of pure crystalline plagioclase has been identified in this crater.

Raimond was named in 1970 by the IAU, after Dutch astronomer Jean Jacques Raimond, Jr..

== Satellite craters ==
By convention these features are identified on lunar maps by placing the letter on the side of the crater midpoint that is closest to Raimond.

Feature	Latitude	Longitude	Diameter	Ref
Raimond K	13.3° N	158.2° W	32.88 km	WGPSN
Raimond Q	11.6° N	161.7° W	27.5 km	WGPSN

== See also ==
- 1450 Raimonda, asteroid
