= Dirichlet–Jackson Basin =

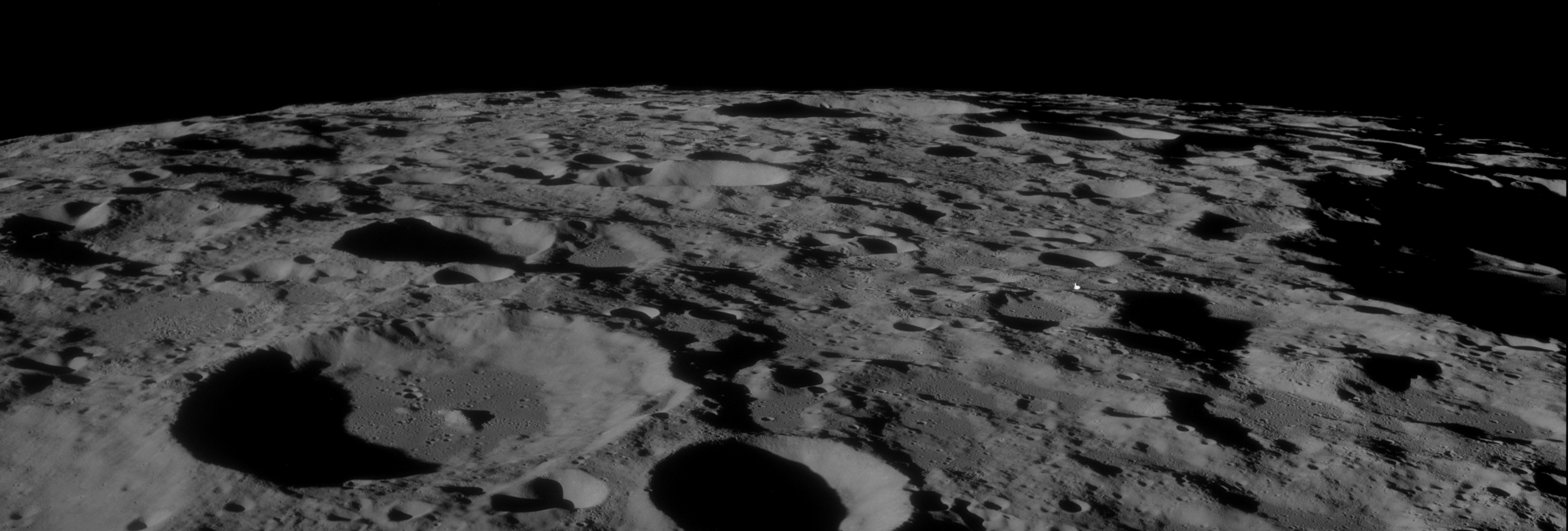
- Oblique view of western Dirichlet–Jackson Basin from Apollo 11. Raimond is near the central horizon.
- Coordinates: 14.0°N 158.0°W
- Diameter: 470 km
- Formation: Pre-Nectarian
- Eponym: Dirichlet and Jackson craters

The Dirichlet–Jackson Basin is a pre-Nectarian impact basin on the far side of the Moon. It is named after the craters Dirichlet (on the southeast margin) and Jackson (northwest of the basin). It lies to the north of the similar-sized basin Korolev.

The basin is not obvious on the lunar surface due to being obscured by subsequent impacts. It was confirmed by topographic mapping by the Clementine spacecraft in 2000. The existence of the basin was confirmed by the GRAIL spacecraft.

Craters within the basin include Raimond, Bredikhin, Mitra, and Henyey (adjacent to Dirichlet), as well as many satellite craters. Due south of the basin is Engel'gardt (and the Selenean summit). To the southwest are Lebedinskiy and Zhukovskiy, and McMath is to the northwest. To the northeast is Mach, and to the southeast is Tsander.

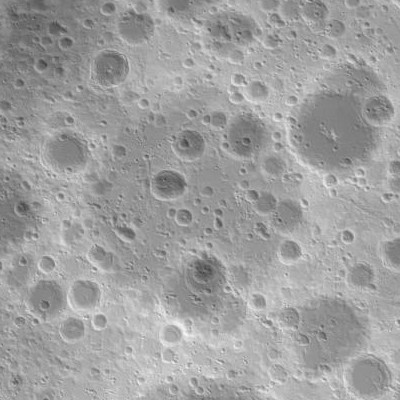
Topographic map

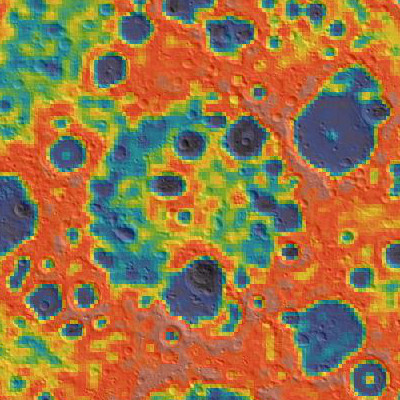
Gravity map based on GRAIL
