= Harvey (crater) =

Crater on the Moon

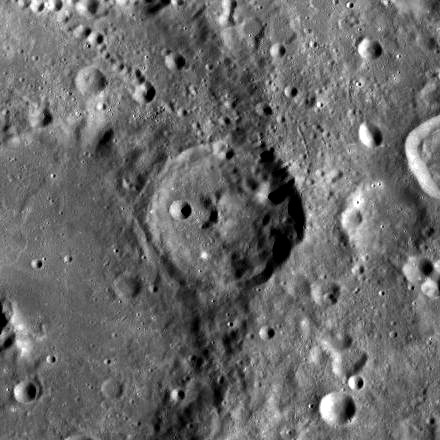
- LRO image
- Coordinates: 19.5°N 146.5°W
- Diameter: 60 km
- Depth: Unknown
- Colongitude: 213° at sunrise
- Eponym: William Harvey

Harvey is a lunar impact crater that is located on the far side of the Moon from the Earth. It lies astride the eastern rim of the much larger crater Mach, and the outer rampart of Harvey extends part way across the interior floor. Some distance to the north of Harvey is the crater Joule, and equally far to the east-southeast is Kekulé.

The rim of Harvey is mildly eroded, and a small craterlet lies in the western part of the interior floor. There is a low central peak at the midpoint. Ray material from Joule T to the north crosses the floor of Harvey, passing along the western side of the midpoint and nearly bisecting the interior.

Prior to formal naming in 1970 by the IAU, this crater was known as Crater 151.
