= Henyey (crater) =

Crater on the Moon

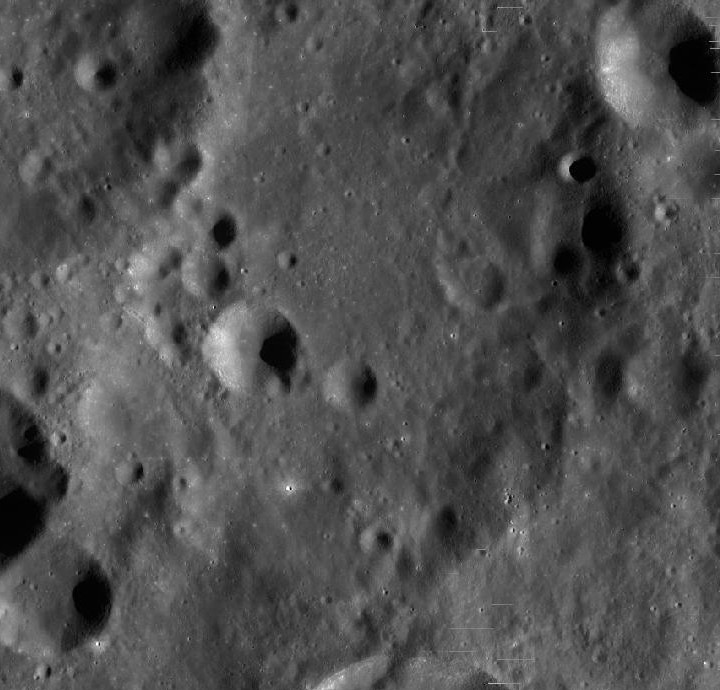
- LRO WAC mosaic
- Coordinates: 13.5°N 151.6°W
- Diameter: 63 km
- Depth: unknown
- Colongitude: 152° at sunrise
- Eponym: Louis Henyey

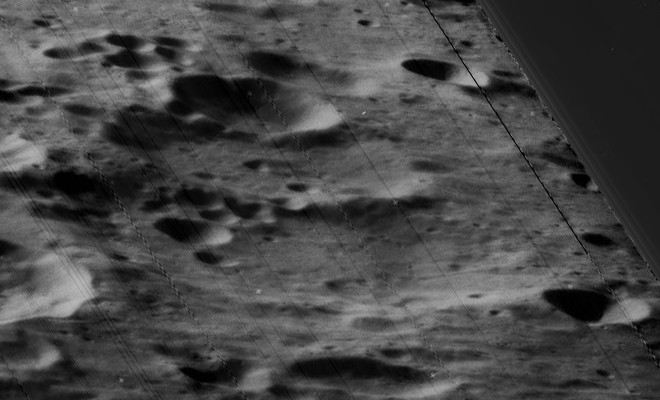
Oblique view from Lunar Orbiter 5 showing Henyey, Henyey U, and Henyey V

Henyey is a lunar impact crater that lies on the far side of the Moon from the Earth. It is attached at the southern end to the northern rim of the crater Dirichlet, and lies on the eastern margin of the Dirichlet-Jackson Basin. Less than a crater diameter to the northeast is the large crater Mach, and to the northwest lies Mitra.

This is a worn and eroded crater that has been partly disintegrated by subsequent impacts. The elongated crater Henyey U is attached to the western outer rim. The western interior floor of Henyey is disrupted by some small craters.

The crater was named in 1970 by the IAU.

== Satellite craters ==
By convention these features are identified on lunar maps by placing the letter on the side of the crater midpoint that is closest to Henyey.

Henyey	Latitude	Longitude	Diameter
U	14.2° N	153.0° W	45 km
V	14.7° N	153.9° W	26 km

== See also ==
- 1365 Henyey, minor planet
