= 1450 Raimonda =

Background asteroid

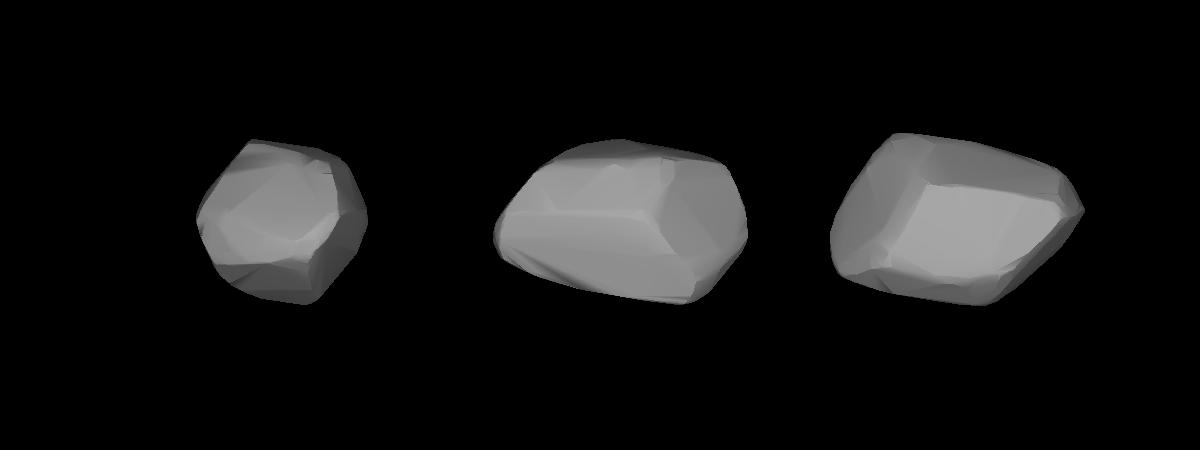
- Lightcurve-based 3D-model of Raimonda

Discovery
- Discovered by: Y. Väisälä
- Discovery site: Turku Obs.
- Discovery date: 20 February 1938

Designations
- Named after: Jean Jacques Raimond, Jr. (Dutch astronomer)
- Alternative designations: 1938 DP · 1934 GJ; A915 TF
- Minor planet category: main-belt · (middle) background

Orbital characteristics
- Epoch 4 September 2017 (JD 2458000.5)
- Uncertainty parameter 0
- Observation arc: 101.96 yr (37,242 days)
- Aphelion: 3.0591 AU
- Perihelion: 2.1642 AU
- Semi-major axis: 2.6117 AU
- Eccentricity: 0.1713
- Orbital period (sidereal): 4.22 yr (1,542 days)
- Mean anomaly: 351.45°
- Mean motion: 0° 14^{m} 0.6^{s} / day
- Inclination: 4.8635°
- Longitude of ascending node: 74.927°
- Argument of perihelion: 13.427°

Physical characteristics
- Dimensions: 14.75 km (derived); 14.76±4.56 km 14.88±0.9 km 18.481±0.084 km 18.700±0.068 km 20.80±1.15 km
- Synodic rotation period: 12.6344 h 12.66 h
- Geometric albedo: 0.074±0.009; 0.0878±0.0170; 0.09±0.10; 0.094±0.019; 0.0976 (derived); 0.1387±0.019
- Spectral type: S (assumed)
- Absolute magnitude (H): 11.90 · 12.30

1450 Raimonda, provisional designation 1938 DP, is a background asteroid from the central regions of the asteroid belt, approximately 15 kilometers in diameter. It was discovered on 20 February 1938, by astronomer Yrjö Väisälä at the Iso-Heikkilä Observatory in Turku, Finland. The asteroid was named after Dutch astronomer Jean Jacques Raimond, Jr.

== Orbit and classification ==
Raimonda is a non-family asteroid of the main belt's background population. It orbits the Sun in the central asteroid belt at a distance of 2.2–3.1 AU once every 4 years and 3 months (1,542 days). Its orbit has an eccentricity of 0.17 and an inclination of 5° with respect to the ecliptic.

The body's observation arc begins with its first identification as A915 TF at Heidelberg Observatory in October 1915, more than 22 years prior to its official discovery observation at Turku.

== Physical characteristics ==
Raimonda is an assumed stony S-type asteroid, despite its rather low albedo.

=== Rotation period and poles ===
In December 2004, a rotational lightcurve of Raimonda was obtained from photometric observations at the Oakley (916) and Tenagra Observatory (848). Lightcurve analysis gave a rotation period of 12.66 hours with a brightness amplitude of 0.64 (or 0.57 at LCDB) magnitude (U=2), indicative of an elongated shape.

In 2013, a lightcurve was modeled from photometric data collected by the Uppsala Asteroid Photometric Catalogue, the Palomar Transient Factory survey, and individual observers, as well as sparse-in-time photometry from the United States Naval Observatory Flagstaff Station, the Catalina Sky Survey in Tucson, and the Roque de los Muchachos Observatory at La Palma. Modelling gave a similar period 12.6344 hours. The study also determined two spin axis of (231.0°, −56.0°) and (71.0°, −60.0°) in ecliptic coordinates (λ, β).

=== Diameter and albedo ===
According to the surveys carried out by the Infrared Astronomical Satellite IRAS, the Japanese Akari satellite and the NEOWISE mission of NASA's Wide-field Infrared Survey Explorer, Raimonda measures between 14.76 and 20.80 kilometers in diameter and its surface has an albedo between 0.074 and 0.1387.

The Collaborative Asteroid Lightcurve Link derives an albedo of 0.0976 and a diameter of 14.75 kilometers based on an absolute magnitude of 12.3.

== Naming ==
This minor planet was named after Jean Jacques Raimond, Jr. (1903–1961), a Dutch astronomer who was the president of the Dutch Astronomical Society (Dutch: Nederlandse Vereniging voor Weer- en Sterrenkunde; Netherlands Association for Meteorology and Astronomy) and director of the Zeiss planetarium at The Hague.

The naming was suggested by Belgian astronomer Jean Meeus, and the official naming citation was published by the Minor Planet Center on 1 February 1965 (M.P.C. 2347). The lunar crater Raimond was also named in his honor.
