= Zhukovskiy (crater) =

Crater on the Moon

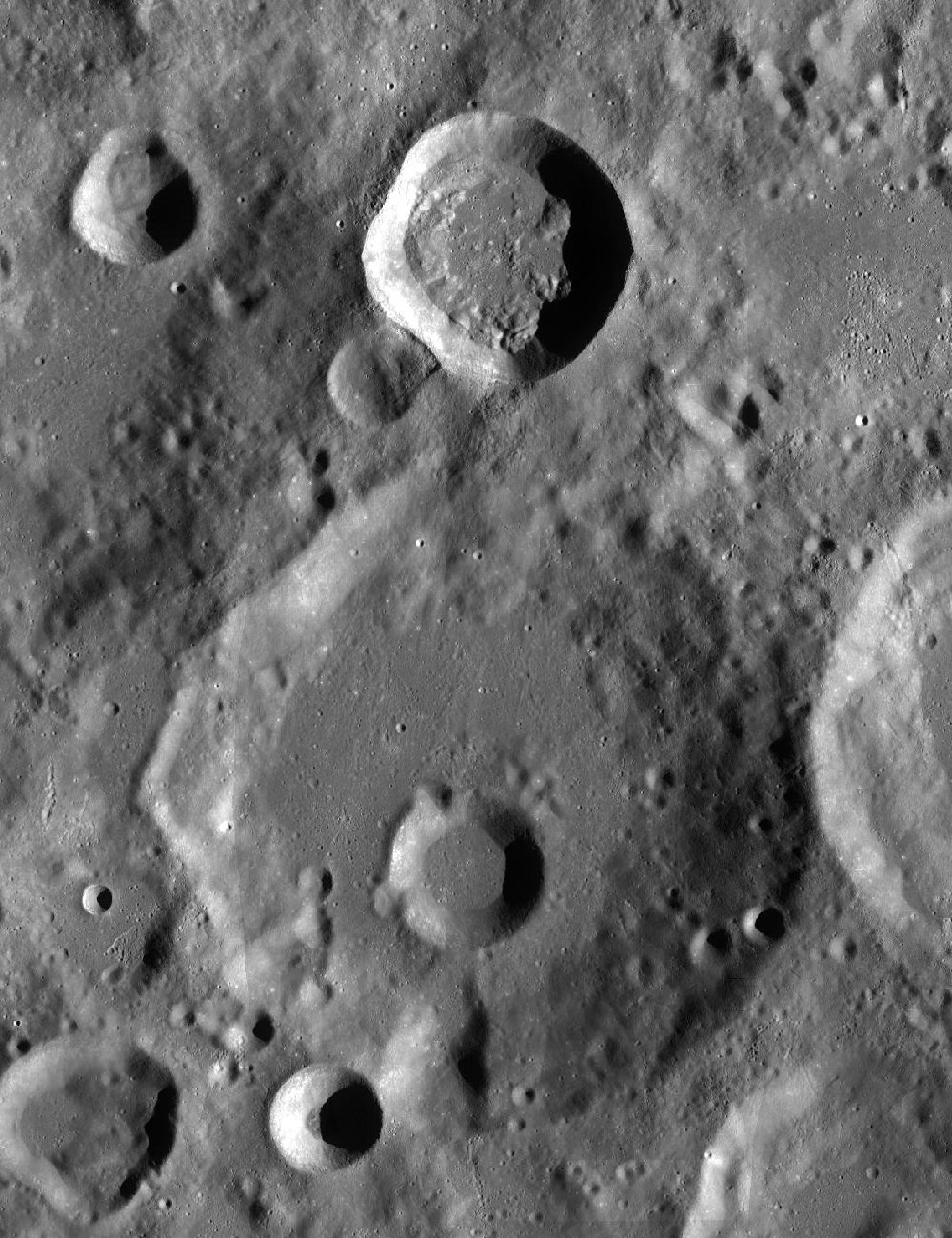
- LRO WAC mosaic with Zhukovskiy at bottom, also showing the fresh Zhukovskiy Z at top
- Coordinates: 7.8°N 167.0°W
- Diameter: 81 km
- Depth: Unknown
- Colongitude: 167° at sunrise
- Formation: Nectarian
- Eponym: Nikolay E. Zhukovskiy

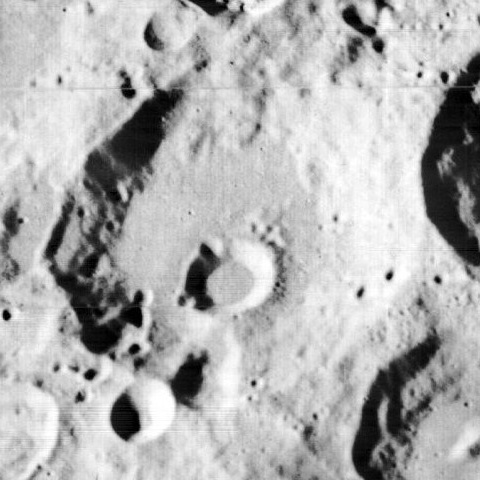
Lunar Orbiter 1 image

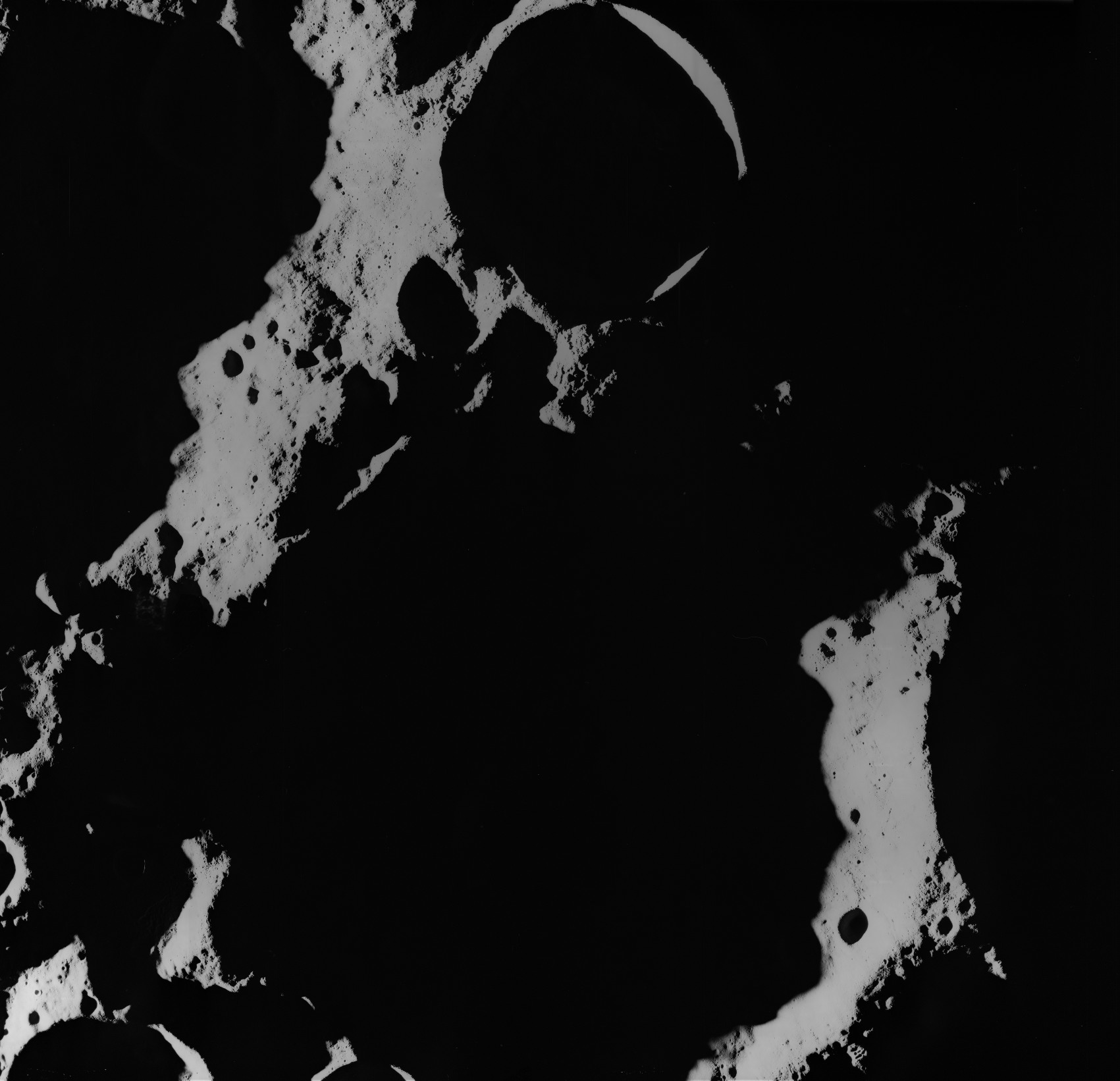
Zhukovskiy and Zhukovskiy Z at the sunrise terminator, from Apollo 16

Zhukovskiy is a lunar impact crater that lies on the far side of the Moon. It lies to the southwest of the Dirichlet–Jackson Basin and forms a pair with Lebedinskiy, which is attached to the eastern rim. There are no other named craters of note in the immediate vicinity, although the immense walled plain named Korolev lies farther to the southeast.

On the lunar geologic timescale, Zhukovskiy dates to Nectarian period. The rim has become somewhat eroded, particularly at the northern and southern extremes. The interior floor is relatively level, although a small but prominent crater occupies part of the southern half.

== Satellite craters ==
By convention these features are identified on lunar maps by placing the letter on the side of the crater midpoint that is closest to Zhukovskiy.

Zhukovskiy	Latitude	Longitude	Diameter
Q	6.2° N	168.8° W	23 km
T	7.9° N	172.3° W	23 km
U	8.5° N	173.2° W	29 km
W	9.8° N	170.3° W	31 km
X	10.5° N	171.1° W	30 km
Z	10.0° N	166.8° W	34 km
