= 1365 Henyey =

Main-belt asteroid

Discovery
- Discovered by: M. F. Wolf
- Discovery site: Heidelberg Obs.
- Discovery date: 9 September 1928

Designations
- Named after: Louis Henyey (American astronomer)
- Alternative designations: 1928 RK · 1932 WL; 1941 ME · 1973 YG_{4} 1984 BA · A907 GK
- Minor planet category: main-belt · Flora

Orbital characteristics
- Epoch 4 September 2017 (JD 2458000.5)
- Uncertainty parameter 0
- Observation arc: 109.96 yr (40,164 days)
- Aphelion: 2.5248 AU
- Perihelion: 1.9723 AU
- Semi-major axis: 2.2486 AU
- Eccentricity: 0.1229
- Orbital period (sidereal): 3.37 yr (1,232 days)
- Mean anomaly: 238.80°
- Mean motion: 0° 17^{m} 32.28^{s} / day
- Inclination: 5.0758°
- Longitude of ascending node: 258.55°
- Argument of perihelion: 337.32°

Physical characteristics
- Dimensions: 10.31±1.91 km 10.958±0.369 km 11.31 km (calculated)
- Synodic rotation period: 18.986±0.002 h 32.2±0.2 h
- Geometric albedo: 0.24 (assumed); 0.26±0.13; 0.280±0.041
- Spectral type: S
- Absolute magnitude (H): 11.80 · 11.9 · 12.01±0.26 · 12.10

1365 Henyey, provisional designation 1928 RK, is a stony Florian asteroid from the inner regions of the asteroid belt, approximately 11 kilometers in diameter. It was discovered by German astronomer Max Wolf at Heidelberg Observatory in southern Germany on 9 September 1928, and named for American astronomer Louis Henyey.

== Orbit and classification ==
Henyey is a member of the Flora family, a large population of stony S-type asteroids in the inner main-belt. It orbits the Sun in the inner main-belt at a distance of 2.0–2.5 AU once every 3 years and 4 months (1,232 days). Its orbit has an eccentricity of 0.12 and an inclination of 5° with respect to the ecliptic. It was first Identified as A907 GK at Heidelberg in 1907. The body's observation arc begins with its official discovery observation in 1928.

== Physical characteristics ==
=== Rotation period ===
In August 2012, a first rotational lightcurve of Henyey was obtained from photometric observations by Daniel Klinglesmith at Etscorn Campus Observatory (719) in New Mexico. It gave a rotation period of 18.986 hours with a brightness variation of 0.23 magnitude (U=2). In November 2016, a divergent period solution of 32.2 hours with a change in brightness of 0.32 magnitude was found by French amateur astronomer René Roy (U=2).

=== Diameter and albedo ===
According to the survey carried out by NASA's Wide-field Infrared Survey Explorer with its subsequent NEOWISE mission, Henyey measures 10.31 and 10.96 kilometers in diameter and its surface has an albedo of 0.26 and 0.28. respectively. The Collaborative Asteroid Lightcurve Link assumes an albedo of 0.24 – derived from 8 Flora, the largest member and namesake of the family – and calculates a diameter of 11.31 kilometers with an absolute magnitude of 11.9.

== Naming ==
Based on a suggestion by William Westbrooke, this minor planet was named after American astronomer Louis Henyey (1910–1970), known for his contributions in the field of stellar structure and stellar evolution. The lunar crater Henyey is also named in his honour. The official naming citation was published by the Minor Planet Center on 20 February 1971 (M.P.C. 3143).
