= Mitra (crater) =

Crater on the Moon

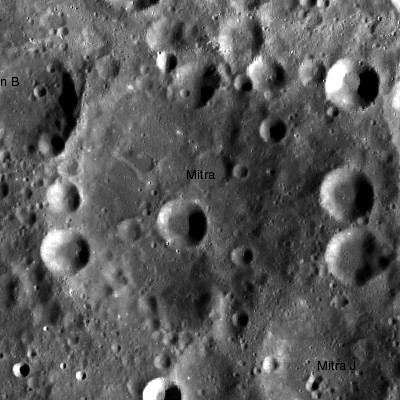
- LRO WAC image
- Coordinates: 18.0°N 154.7°W
- Diameter: 92 km
- Depth: Unknown
- Colongitude: 155° at sunrise
- Eponym: Sisir K. Mitra

Mitra is a lunar impact crater on the far side of the Moon. It is named after Sisir Kumar Mitra, who was an Indian physicist and Padma Bhushan award recipient known for his pioneering work in the field of ionosphere and radiophysics. The crater was named in 1970 by the IAU.

This is a heavily eroded formation with an outer rim that has been damaged by subsequent impacts. Attached to the exterior along the southeast is the satellite crater Mitra J. A number of smaller impacts lie along the rim edge, and very little of the original rim remains intact. Within the interior, a smaller crater occupies the southwestern part of the floor, and a small, cup-shaped crater lies across the northeast rim of this formation and very close to the midpoint of Mitra.

Mitra lies within the Dirichlet–Jackson Basin. It is attached west of the larger crater Mach. Just to the west of Mitra is Bredikhin, and to the south-southeast lies Henyey.

== Satellite craters ==
By convention these features are identified on lunar maps by placing the letter on the side of the crater midpoint that is closest to Mitra.

Mitra	Latitude	Longitude	Diameter
A	20.8° N	154.1° W	46 km
J	15.9° N	153.2° W	46 km
Y	21.5° N	155.2° W	26 km

== See also ==
- Bose (crater)
