= Bredikhin (crater) =

Crater on the Moon

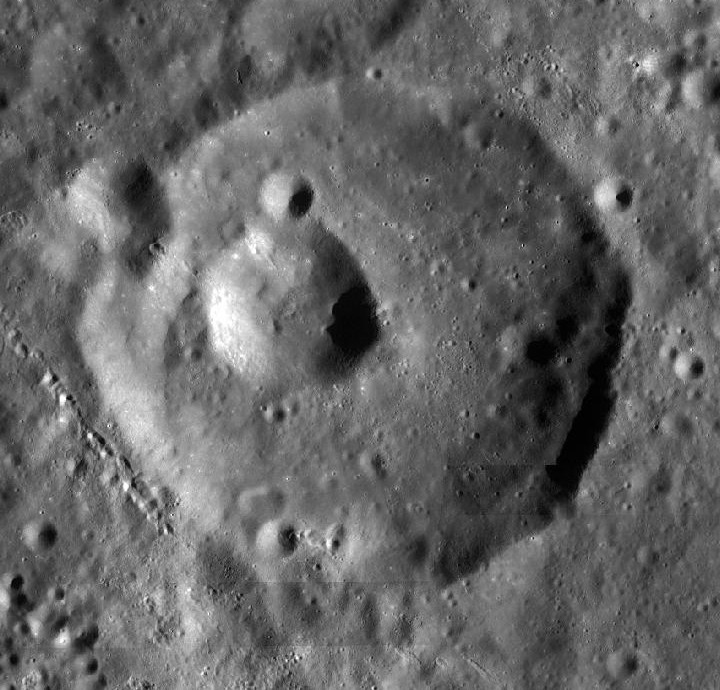
- LRO WAC mosaic
- Coordinates: 17.3°N 158.2°W
- Diameter: 61.68 km
- Depth: Unknown
- Colongitude: 159° at sunrise
- Eponym: Fedor A. Bredikhin

Bredikhin is a lunar impact crater that is located on the far side of the Moon. Bredikhin lies just to the west of the crater Mitra, and northeast of Raimond. It is within the Dirichlet-Jackson Basin.

This is a worn crater formation with features that have been dusted by material from the ray system of Jackson, about three crater diameters to the northwest. The rim is overlain by a small crater along the west-northwest. The most prominent feature within the interior is the crater which overlays much of the northwest floor, including the midpoint.

This crater is named after Russian astronomer Fedor A. Bredikhin (1831–1904). Prior to its designation being formally adopted by the International Astronomical Union in 1970, this crater was known as Crater 233.

== Satellite craters ==
By convention these features are identified on lunar maps by placing the letter on the side of the crater midpoint that is closest to Bredikhin.

Bredikhin	Latitude	Longitude	Diameter	Ref
B	18.87°	−157.24°	19.31 km	WGPSN

== See also ==
- Asteroid 786 Bredichina
