= 786 Bredichina =

Carbonaceous and very large background asteroid

Discovery
- Discovered by: F. Kaiser
- Discovery site: Heidelberg Obs.
- Discovery date: 20 April 1914

Designations
- Named after: Fyodor Bredikhin (1831–1904); (Russian astronomer)
- Alternative designations: A914 HD · 1914 UO
- Minor planet category: main-belt · (outer); background

Orbital characteristics
- Epoch 31 May 2020 (JD 2459000.5)
- Uncertainty parameter 0
- Observation arc: 105.79 yr (38,638 d)
- Aphelion: 3.6852 AU
- Perihelion: 2.6690 AU
- Semi-major axis: 3.1771 AU
- Eccentricity: 0.1599
- Orbital period (sidereal): 5.66 yr (2,068 d)
- Mean anomaly: 267.56°
- Mean motion: 0° 10^{m} 26.4^{s} / day
- Inclination: 14.518°
- Longitude of ascending node: 89.766°
- Argument of perihelion: 133.61°

Physical characteristics
- Dimensions: 160.5 km × 80.6 km
- Mean diameter: 91.60±6.2 km; 105.28±3.41 km; 108.309±0.868 km; 111.47±1.30 km
- Mass: (9.81 ± 5.40/3.21)×10^{17} kg (1.14±0.18)×10^{18} kg (Note: Calculated from its standard gravitational parameter GM = 0.076±0.012 km^{3}/s^{2}.)
- Mean density: 1.606 ± 0.884/0.526 g/cm^{3} 1.71 g/cm^{3} (Note: Assuming a diameter of 108 km.)
- Synodic rotation period: 29.434±0.001 h
- Geometric albedo: 0.051±0.001; 0.052±0.008; 0.0730±0.011
- Spectral type: Tholen = C; B–V = 0.692±0.021; U–B = 0.254±0.029
- Absolute magnitude (H): 8.65; 8.9; 8.95

786 Bredichina (prov. designation: A914 HD or 1914 UO) is a carbonaceous and very large background asteroid, approximately 104 kilometers (65 miles) in diameter, located in the outer region of the asteroid belt. It was discovered by German astronomer Franz Kaiser at the Heidelberg-Königstuhl State Observatory on 20 April 1914. The elongated C-type asteroid has a longer than average rotation period of 29.4 hours. It was named after Russian astronomer Fyodor Bredikhin (1831–1904).

== Orbit and classification ==
Bredichina is a non-family asteroid of the main belt's background population when applying the hierarchical clustering method to its proper orbital elements. It orbits the Sun in the outer main-belt at a distance of 2.7–3.7 AU once every 5 years and 8 months (2,068 days; semi-major axis of 3.18 AU). Its orbit has an eccentricity of 0.16 and an inclination of 15° with respect to the ecliptic. The body's observation arc begins at Heidelberg Observatory on 21 April 1914, the night after its official discovery observation.

== Naming ==
This minor planet was named after Fyodor Bredikhin (1831–1904), also known as Theodor or Feodor Alexandrovich Bredichin, a Russian astronomer and director of the Pulkovo Observatory. He has made important contributions to the study of comets. The naming was also mentioned in The Names of the Minor Planets by Paul Herget in 1955 (H 78). The lunar crater Bredikhin is also named after him.

== Physical characteristics ==
In the Tholen classification, Bredichina is a common, carbonaceous C-type asteroid. It is also a C-type and C0-type in the Tedesco and Barucci classification from the 1908s. Fienga et al. estimate a mass of (9.81 ± 5.40/3.21)×10^{17} kg.

=== Rotation period ===
In March 2015, a rotational lightcurve of Bredichina was obtained from photometric observations by Spanish astronomers Alfonso Carreño (J08), Amadeo Aznar (Z95), Enrique Arce (J67), Pedro Brines (Z98), and Juan Lozano (I57). Lightcurve analysis gave a rotation period of 29.434±0.001 hours with a brightness variation of 0.51±0.02 magnitude (U=3−).

Previously, in August 2008, Argentine astronomer Ricardo Gil-Hutton derived period of 18.61±0.02 hours with an amplitude of 0.60±0.03 magnitude (U=2). Tentative measurements were also made by Italian Nicola Cornero and Federico Manzini at the Sozzago Astronomical Station (A12) in May 2010, which gave a period of 27.88 hours with an amplitude of 0.049 magnitude (U=2−). The same period was also determined by Eric Barbotin in February 2020, though with a higher brightness variation of 0.51±0.24.

=== Diameter and albedo ===
According to the surveys carried out by the Infrared Astronomical Satellite IRAS, the NEOWISE mission of NASA's Wide-field Infrared Survey Explorer (WISE), and the Japanese Akari satellite, Bredichina measures (91.60±6.2), (108.309±0.868) and (111.47±1.30) kilometers in diameter and its surface has an albedo of (0.0730±0.011), (0.052±0.008) and (0.051±0.001), respectively. The Collaborative Asteroid Lightcurve Link adopts the results obtained by IRAS, that is, an albedo of 0.0730 and a diameter of 91.60 kilometers based on an absolute magnitude of 8.65. Alternative mean diameter measurements published by the WISE team include (84.50±26.02 km), (93.62±31.89 km), (98.719±1.004 km), (127.664±58.629 km) and (130.149±43.55 km) with corresponding albedos of (0.04±0.03), (0.05±0.09), (0.0628±0.0021), (0.028±0.014) and (0.0347±0.0308).

On 10 January 2015, an asteroid occultation of Bredichina gave a best-fit ellipse dimension of (160.5 km × 80.6 km), indicative of a highly elongated shape, with a good quality rating of 3. These timed observations are taken when the asteroid passes in front of a distant star.
