= Lebedinskiy (crater) =

Crater on the Moon

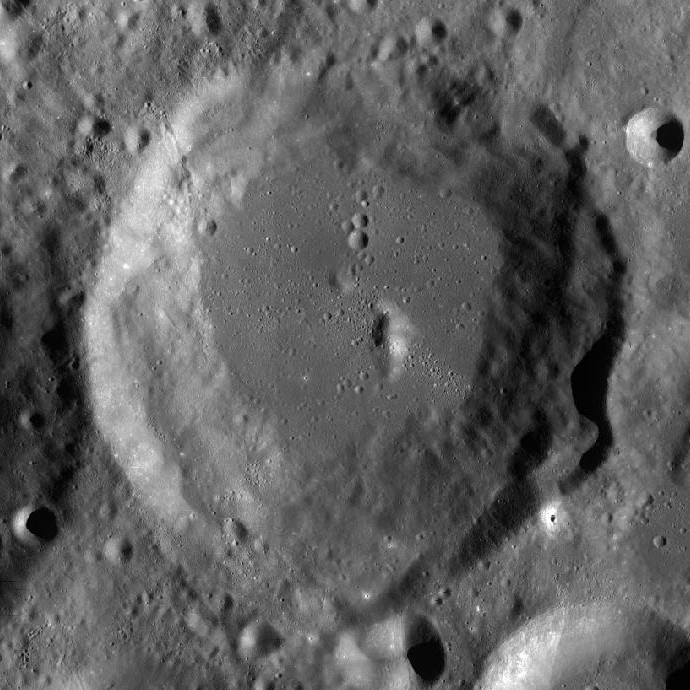
- LRO WAC mosaic
- Coordinates: 8.3°N 164.3°W
- Diameter: 62 km
- Depth: Unknown
- Colongitude: 165° at sunrise
- Formation: Nectarian
- Eponym: Aleksandr I. Lebedinskiy

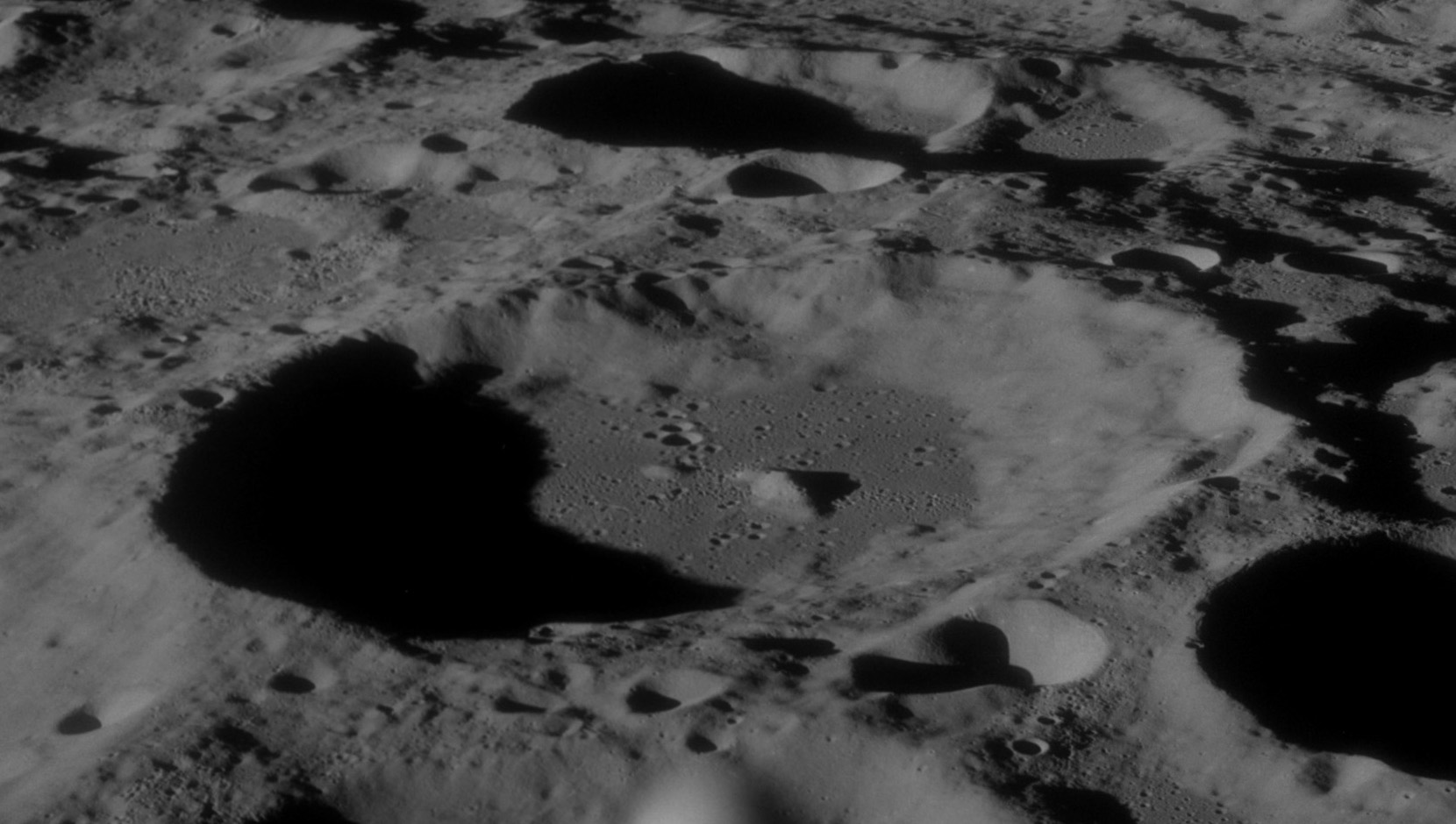
Oblique view from Apollo 11

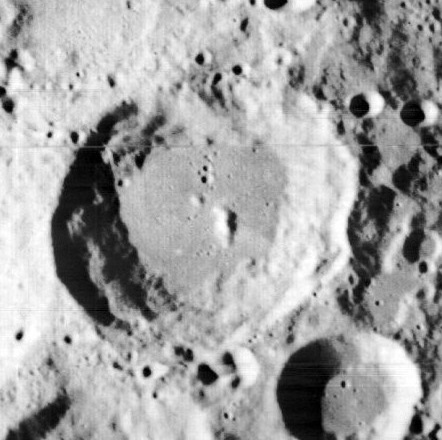
Lunar Orbiter 1 image

Lebedinskiy is an impact crater on the far side of the Moon. It is attached to the eastern outer rim of the somewhat larger crater Zhukovskiy. About two crater diameters to the east-southeast lies the smaller Engel'gardt. The satellite crater Lebedinskiy P lies in the southern indentation of terrain between Lebedinskiy and Zhukovsky, and is nearly attached to the southwest rim of Lebedinskiy.

This is a relatively well-formed crater with a circular outer rim that is only slightly eroded. The inner wall has some slumped shelves and slight terracing along the north and west. The interior floor is generally level, with a low central rise offset to the east of the midpoint, and only a few tiny craterlets marking the surface.

Lebedinskiy is a crater of Nectarian age.

Lebedinskiy lies to the southwest of the Dirichlet-Jackson Basin.

== Satellite craters ==
By convention these features are identified on lunar maps by placing the letter on the side of the crater midpoint that is closest to Lebedinskiy.

Lebedinskiy	Latitude	Longitude	Diameter
A	10.9° N	163.7° W	38 km
B	10.5° N	163.2° W	37 km
K	6.6° N	163.3° W	29 km
P	6.0° N	165.0° W	51 km
