= Louis G. Henyey =

American astronomer (1910–1970)

Louis George Henyey (February 3, 1910 – February 18, 1970) was an American astronomer.

His parents, Albert and Mary Henyey, were immigrants from Hungary. Louis George Henyey married Elizabeth Rose Belak, born in Budapest, on April 28, 1934; they had three children: Thomas Louis, Francis Stephen, and Elizabeth Maryrose.

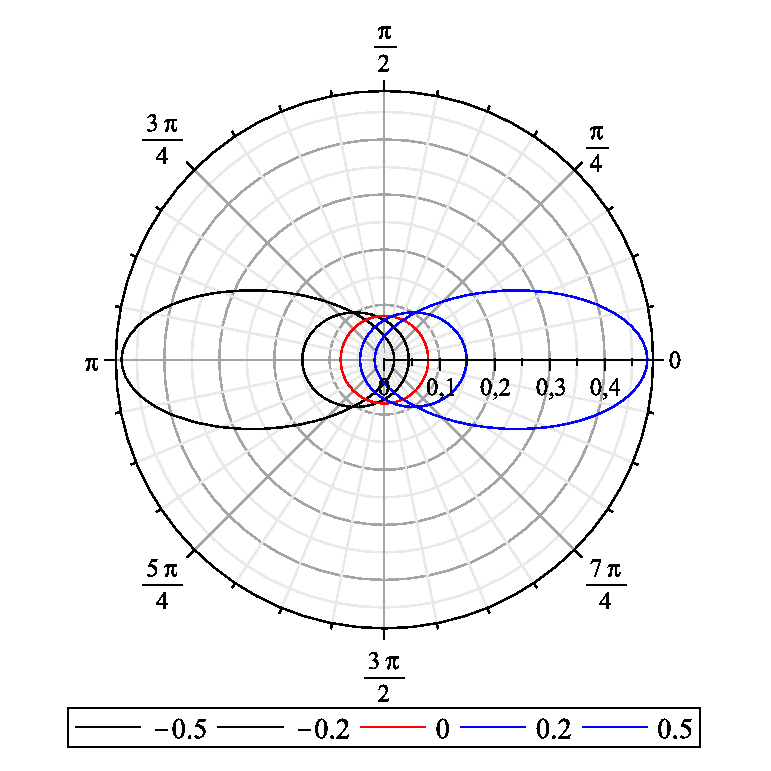
Henyey-Greenstein phase function

His undergrad (1932) and masters (1933) were from the Case School of Applied Science. In Yerkes Observatory of the University of Chicago he earned his doctorate in 1937, with a mathematical thesis on the topic of reflection nebulae. In 1947 he accepted a position as assistant professor in the Department of Astronomy at the University of California, Berkeley, and in 1954 he was promoted to professor. At Berkeley he became head of his own research group in the field of stellar evolution and supervised and collaborated with numerous graduate students, postdoctoral fellows, and scientific visitors. He died unexpectedly of a cerebral hemorrhage on February 18, 1970.

He is best known for his two major scientific contributions in the field of stellar structure and evolution. First, he developed a method for automatic solution of the equations of stellar evolution, suitable for electronic computers and applicable to a wide range of physical conditions and phases in the lifetime of a star. Second, he made new calculation of the evolution of stars during their early history when gravitational contraction provides the main energy source, and during the transition phase when nuclear energy takes over from the gravitational source. His work on the diffusion of the light in galaxies with Jesse Greenstein resulted in what is referred to as the Henyey-Greenstein phase function, first proposed in a paper he authored. This scattering model has found use in other scientific disciplines.

The crater Henyey on the Moon is named after him, as is the asteroid called 1365 Henyey.
