= Dirichlet (crater) =

Crater on the Moon

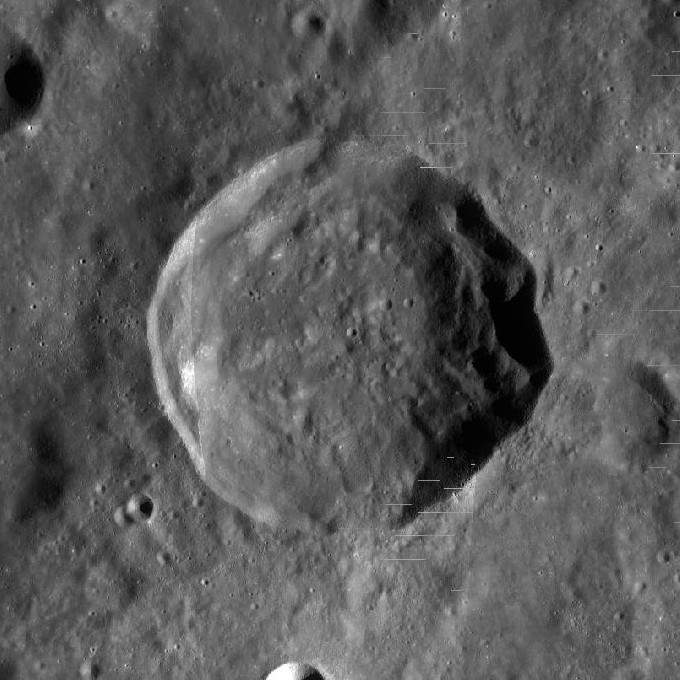
- LRO WAC mosaic
- Coordinates: 11.1°N 151.4°W
- Diameter: 47.24 km (29.35 mi)
- Depth: Unknown
- Colongitude: 208° at sunrise
- Formation: Late Imbrian
- Eponym: Peter G. L. Dirichlet

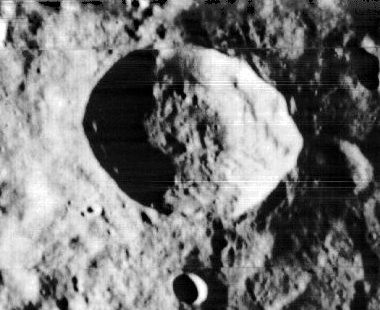
Oblique Lunar Orbiter 1 image

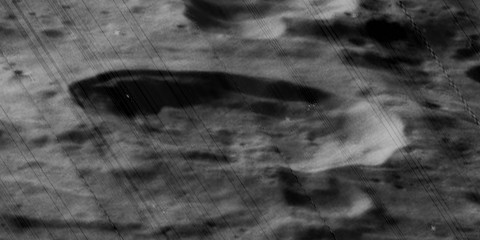
Oblique Lunar Orbiter 5 image

Dirichlet is a lunar impact crater that is located on the Moon's far side. It lies on the eastern margin of the Dirichlet-Jackson Basin, and is nearly attached to the southern outer rim of the crater Henyey. To the south-southeast is the much larger crater Tsander.

On the lunar geologic timescale, this formation dates to the Late Imbrian period. It is a circular crater with a sharp-edged rim that is not significantly worn. There are slight outward protrusions along the eastern side. The sides of the inner walls have slumped down to form a ring of scree along the base.

This formation is named after German mathematician Peter G. L. Dirichlet (1805-1859). Its designation was officially adopted by the International Astronomical Union in 1970.

== Satellite craters ==
By convention these features are identified on lunar maps by placing the letter on the side of the crater midpoint that is closest to Dirichlet.

| Dirichlet | Latitude | Longitude | Diameter |
|---|---|---|---|
| E | 12.2° N | 147.8° W | 26 km |
