= Mach (crater) =

Crater on the Moon

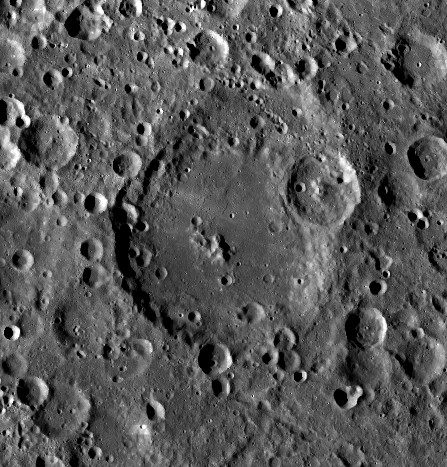
- LRO image
- Coordinates: 18.13°N 149.24°W
- Diameter: 174.97 km (108.72 mi)
- Depth: Unknown
- Colongitude: 152° at sunrise
- Eponym: Ernst Mach

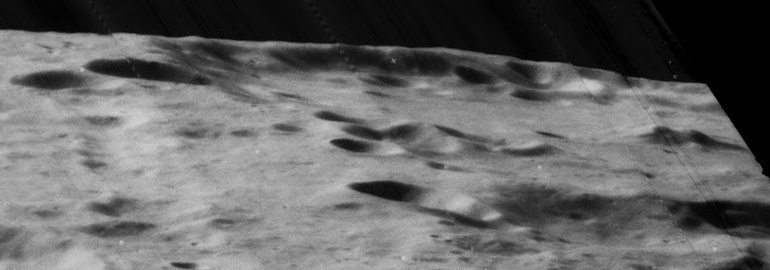
Highly oblique Lunar Orbiter 5 view of southern Mach crater, facing west.

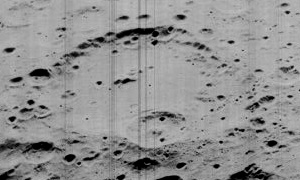
Oblique Lunar Orbiter 5 view of Mach crater.

Mach is a large lunar impact crater of the type known as a walled plain. It is located on the far side of the Moon and cannot be viewed directly from the Earth.

This is a prominent but eroded formation with multiple craters along the rim and interior. The crater Harvey breaks across the eastern rim, and its outer rampart spills across the interior floor of Mach. The overall shape of Mach resembles a pear, with a prominent outward bulge to the northeast. Such a bulge can be caused by a second, merged crater. The northern edge is also the most worn and overlain by impacts.

The interior of Mach is marked by several small craters, particularly in the northeastern bulge. Several craters also lie along the edges to the west and northwest. The remainder of the interior floor is relatively level, when compared to the terrain that surrounds Mach. There is a formation of central ridges near the midpoint of the crater. The infrared spectrum of pure crystalline plagioclase has been identified on this central rise.

Prior to formal naming in 1970 by the IAU, this crater was known as Crater 236.

Nearby craters of note include Joule to the northeast, Mitra along the western outer rim, and Henyey to the southwest. Mach lies to the northeast of the Dirichlet–Jackson Basin.

== Satellite craters ==
By convention these features are identified on lunar maps by placing the letter on the side of the crater midpoint that is closest to Mach.

Mach	Latitude	Longitude	Diameter
H	14.9° N	144.1° W	40 km
