= Vladimir Artemyev =

- Born: Vladimir Andreyevich Artemyev; 6 July 1885; Saint Petersburg, Russian Empire
- Died: 11 September 1962 (aged 77); Moscow, USSR
- Occupations: Rocket and missile engineering
- Notable work: Gas Dynamics Laboratory, Katyusha

Vladimir Andreyevich Artemyev (Russian: Владимир Андреевич Артемьев; 6 July [O.S. 24 June] 1885 – 11 September 1962) was a Soviet Russian rocket scientist at the Gas Dynamics Laboratory, and was one of the inventors of the Katyusha. The first rocket propelled by smokeless trotyl-pyroxylin powder was launched under his direction in 1928. Artem'ev crater is named in his honour.

== Biography ==
=== Early years and service in the Russian Imperial Army ===
Vladimir Artemyev was born on the 6 June [O.S. 25 May] 1885 in a noble family, his father was a military officer. In 1905 Vladimir graduated from the 1st St Petersburg Gymnasium and volunteered for the Russo-Japanese War. For his valour he was rewarded with the 4th class Cross of St. George and promoted to the rank of non-commissioned officer.

On 28 June [O.S. 15 June] 1908 he graduated from military school in the rank of second lieutenant and commissioned to the Brest Fortress artillery unit. There he headed the loading room and engaged in experiments with flares. He installed seven aluminium parachute flares into a rocket head, his invention exceeded several standard missiles in the illuminating power. On 12 September [O.S. 30 August] 1908 he was promoted to the rank of lieutenant. Then he served as an engineer under chief technology officer at the GRAU.

=== Rocket Engineering ===
After the October Revolution Artemyev didn’t leave the country. In 1920 he acquainted Nikolai Tihomirov and soon became his main assistant. In Spring 1920 Tikhomirov and Artemyev equipped a small laboratory on Tikhvinskaya street in Moscow and conducted a series of experiments with charcoal gunpowder. The scientists financed the research with their own money, to support the laboratory they crafted and sold toys and bicycle supplies. In March 1921 Tikhomirov decided to modify the laboratory and engage in rocket engineering. His main interest was the solid-propellant rocket. In the same year, the scientists started working on air projectiles.

On 22 September 1922 Vladimir Artemyev was arrested on charges of espionage, inaction and negligence that undermined the Red Army’s supply in artillery and projectiles. Under the Special Council of the NKVD decision from 10 June 1923, he was sentenced to 3 years at the Solovki prison camp.

In 1924 Artemyev was released from the camp and returned to work at the Tikhomirov’s laboratory. In the same year he offered to construct propellant charges from smokeless gunpowder based on non-volatile solvents. In 1925 the laboratory relocated to Leningrad. On 3 March 1928 the first rocket on a smokeless gunpowder propellant was tested at one of the training areas near Leningrad. According to Artemyev, that configuration became the prototype of the missiles for ‘Katyusha’. In July 1928 the laboratory was renamed into the Gas Dynamics Laboratory (GDL) of the Revolutionary Military Council. After the decease of Nikolay Tikhomirov, Boris Petropavlovsky became its new head, in 1931 he was replaced by Nikolay Ilyin. Since that year the laboratory has been subjected to the Red Army Office of Military Inventions of the Technical Staff of the Chief of Armaments. In 1932 Ivan Kleymyonov was assigned to the director’s post. In September 1933 GIRD and GDL merged into the Reactive Scientific Research Institute (RNII). Artemyev designed RS-82 fin-stabilized rockets with extended fins. In 1937-1938 Polikarpov I-15, Polikarpov I-16, Polikarpov I-153 were equipped with jet-propelled projectiles. In Summer 1939 RS-82 rockets were successfully used in the Battles of Khalkhin Gol.

In 1938-1941 RNII (now renamed the Research Institute №3 or NII-3) under chief constructor Andrey Kostikov engineers Ivan Gvay, Vladimir Galkovsky, Alexey Pavlenko, R. I. Popov and Vladimir Artemyev designed the Katyusha rocket launcher. Artemyev was in charge of rocket construction. On 23 March 1943 he was awarded with the 1st class USSR State Prize in honour of his major improvements in mortar tubes and ammunition.

External image
- Artemyev’s memorial stone at Novodevichy Cemetery

During World War II Artemyev kept working as a military engineer. In 1945 with S. F. Fonaryov he co-created an antisubmarine mortar with depth rocket-propelled missiles. After the war Artemyev kept working on rocket construction at research institutes and laboratories.

Vladimir Artemyev died on 11 September 1962. The ashes were placed in the columbarium at the Novodevichy Cemetery.

== Awards ==
- The Order of the Red Banner of Labour (24 November 1942);
- the 1st class Order of the Patriotic War (18 November 1944);
- the 2d class Stalin Prize (23 March 1941);
- the 1st class Stalin Prize (23 March 1943).

== Memory ==
The Artem'ev lunar crater on the far side of the Moon was named after the scientist.

== Sources ==
- Glushko, V. P., ed. (1985). The Great Soviet Encyclopedia: Сosmonautics (in Russian). Moscow: The Great Soviet Encyclopedia. pp. 30–31.
