= Kibalʹchich (crater) =

Crater on the Moon

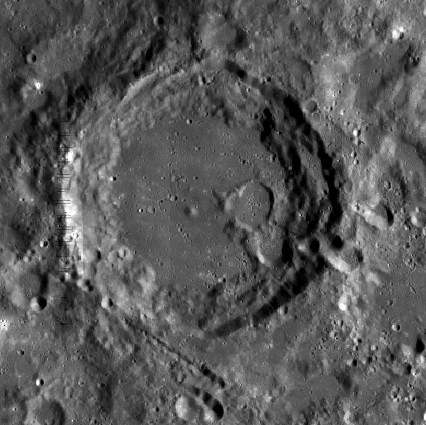
- LRO image
- Coordinates: 2.72°N 147.18°W
- Diameter: 91.67 km
- Depth: Unknown
- Colongitude: 148° at sunrise
- Formation: Nectarian
- Eponym: Nikolaj I. Kibalʹchich

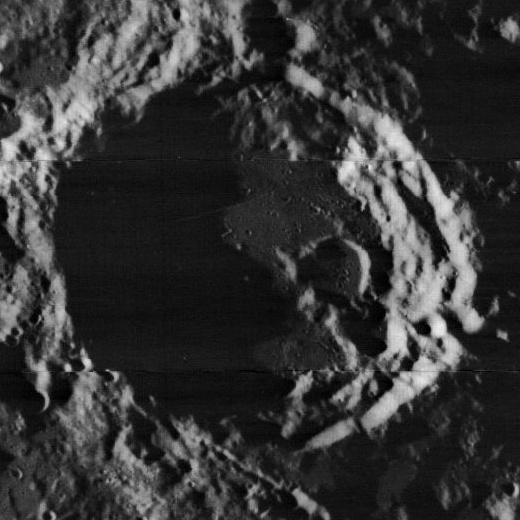
Lunar Orbiter 1 image

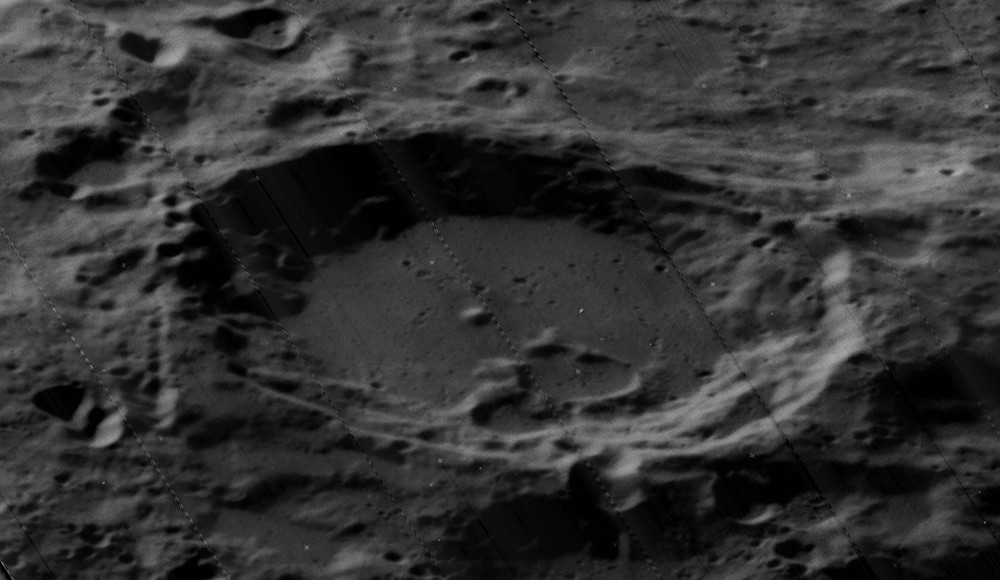
Oblique Lunar Orbiter 5 image

Kibalʹchich is a crater on the Moon's far side. It lies to the northeast of the large walled plain designated Korolev, and is attached to the southeastern outer rim of the crater Tsander.

On the lunar geologic timescale, Kibalʹchich dates to the Nectarian period. Its rim is slightly eroded, and the shared border with Tsander has produced a straightened rim along the northwest side. But the edge remains well-defined and the inner walls display some terrace-like shelves. The interior floor is relatively level, with the remains of a small crater rim in the southeast quadrant. There is a small ridge located near the midpoint.

The crater's name was approved by the IAU in 1970. Prior to formal naming, this crater was identified as Crater 238.

== Satellite craters ==
By convention these features are identified on lunar maps by placing the letter on the side of the crater midpoint that is closest to Kibalʹchich.

Kibalʹchich	Latitude	Longitude	Diameter
H	2.0° N	144.2° W	40 km
Q	0.7° S	149.0° W	25 km
R	0.6° N	150.1° W	29 km
