= Engelhardt Observatory =

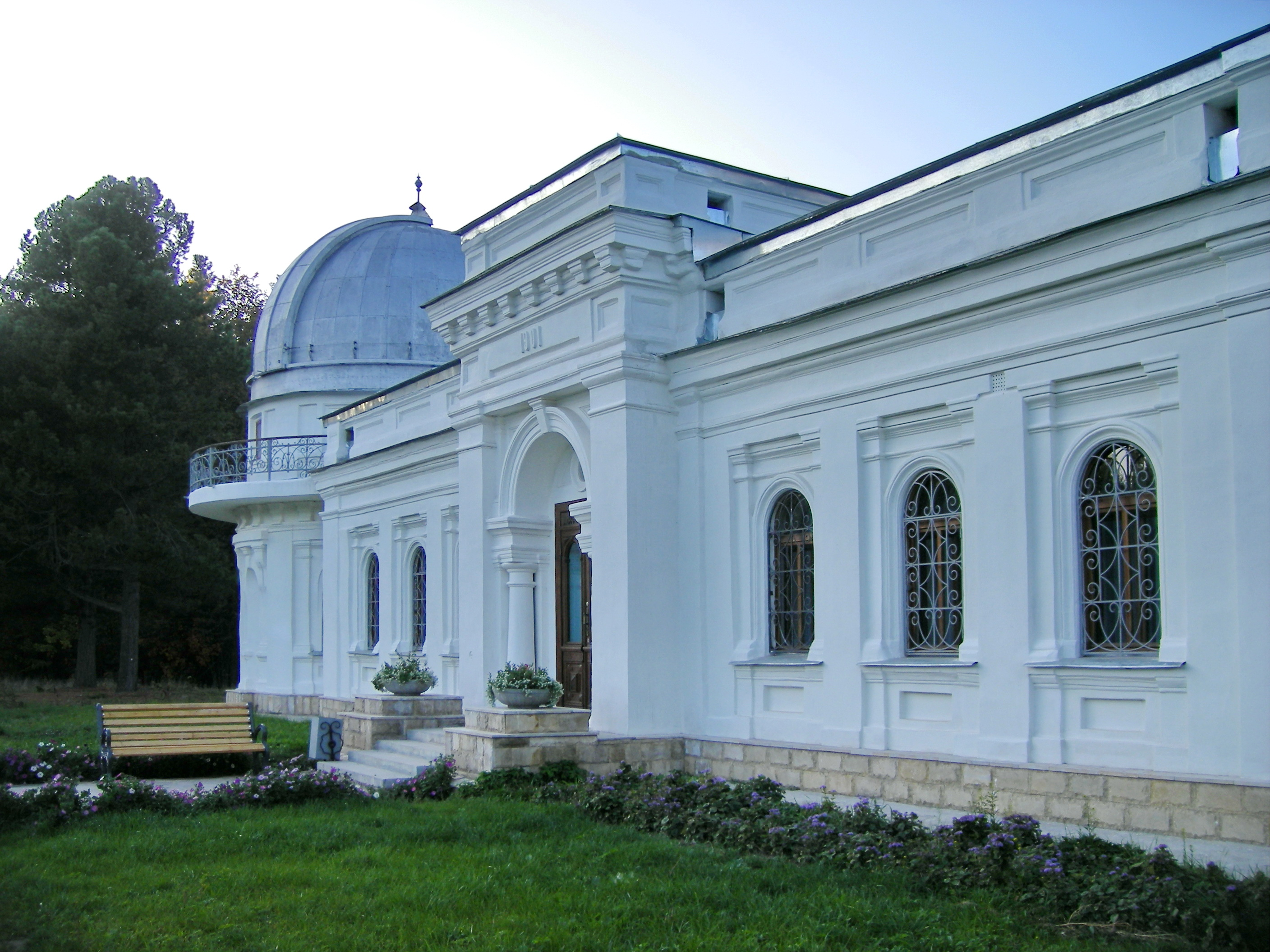
- Alternative names: V. P. Engel'gardt Astronomical Observatory
- Named after: Vasily Engelhardt
- Observatory code: 136
- Location: Tatarstan, Russia
- Coordinates: 55°50′23″N 48°48′45″E
- Altitude: 92 m (302 ft)
- Established: 1901
- Website: www.ksu.ru/eng/departments/eao/
- Location of Engelhardt Observatory
- Related media on Commons

The V. P. Engel'gardt Astronomical Observatory (Russian: Астрономическая обсерватория им. В. П. Энгельгардта), also known simply as the Engelhardt Observatory, is located in the village of Oktyabrsky, Zelenodolsky District, Tatarstan (about 20 kilometers west of Kazan). Its observatory code is 136. The co-ordinates are about 55°50′23″N 48°48′45″E. It was founded by Dmitry Dubyago and Vasily Engelhardt.

In 2023 the Astronomical Observatory of Kazan University and the Engelhardt Observatory were added to the UNESCO World Heritage List (although ICOMOS did not recommend inscribing them).

== History ==
The Engelhardt Observatory was established by Dmitry Dubyago. In 1897, astronomer Vasily Engelhardt donated equipment to Kazan University to set up the observatory, which officially opened on September 21, 1901. The main building was designed by architect Fyodor Malinovsky. After Dubyago's passing, he was laid to rest in a crypt built on a mound, designed by architect Karl Hermann Ludwig Müffke. In 2014, Engelhardt's remains were also reinterred in this crypt.

In 1908, a stone tower with a rotating dome was constructed for a heliometer, followed by a pavilion for an astrograph in 1914. In 1929, Avenir Yakovkin, the observatory's director, acquired a 120-mm Zeiss lens and an objective prism for the Heide astrograph, enabling the photography of star fields and the capture of stellar spectra. Yakovkin's extensive heliometer observations led to refined measurements of the Moon's physical libration.

In 2021, the observatory museum was opened. Much of equipment donated by Engelhardt is still in situ and may be seen.

Photographs made before 1909

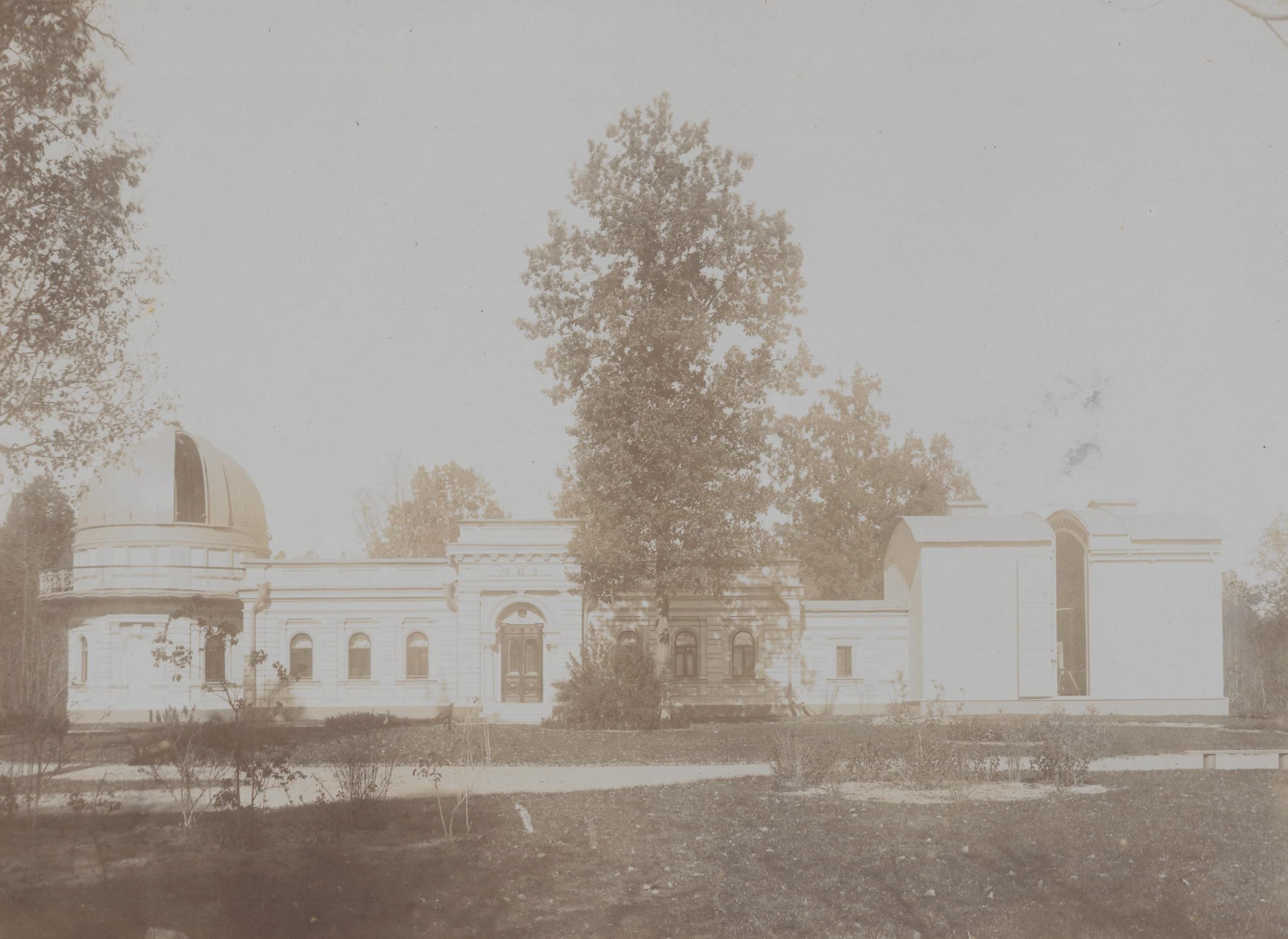
Engel'gardt Observatory.

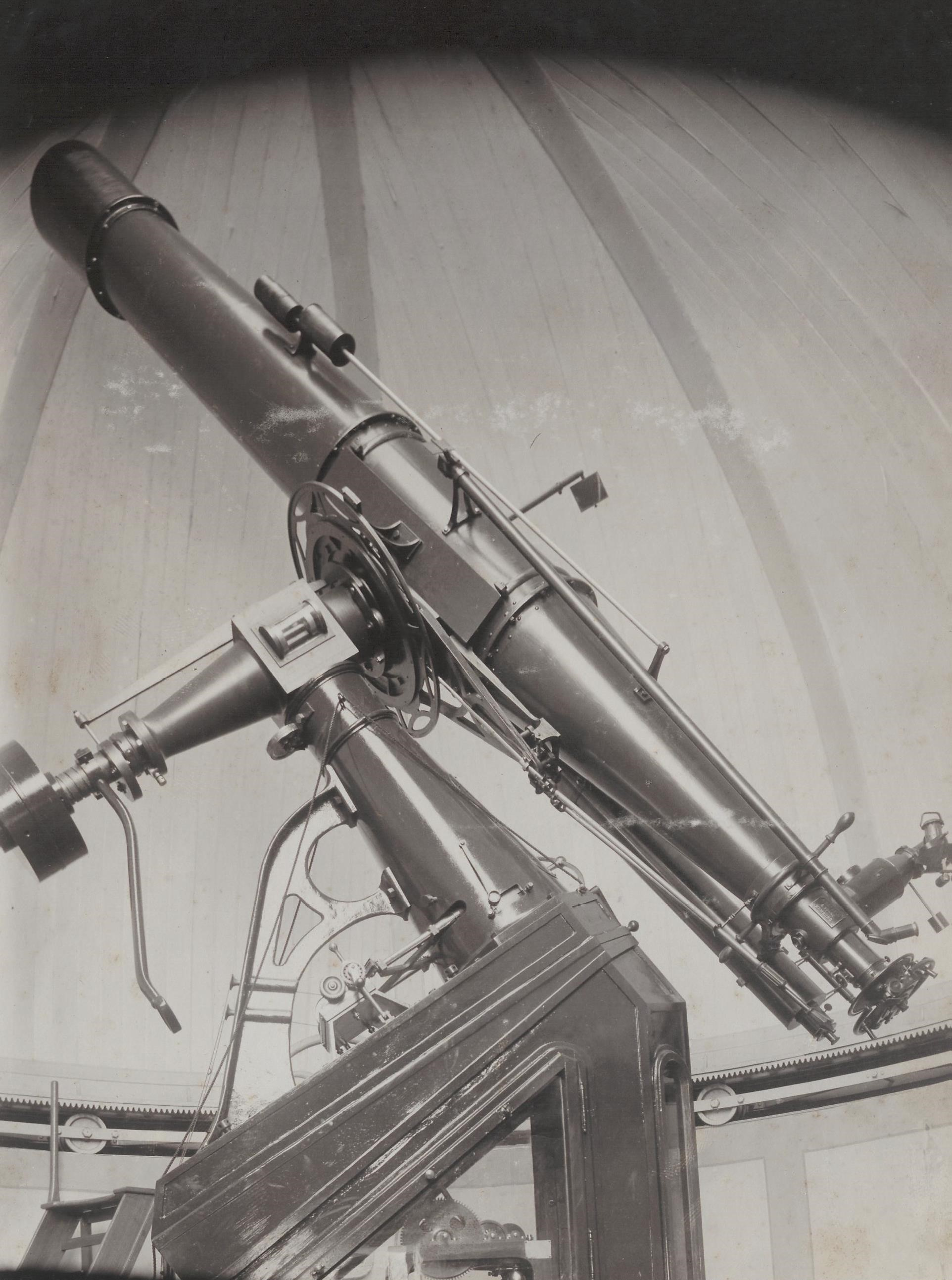
Refractor.

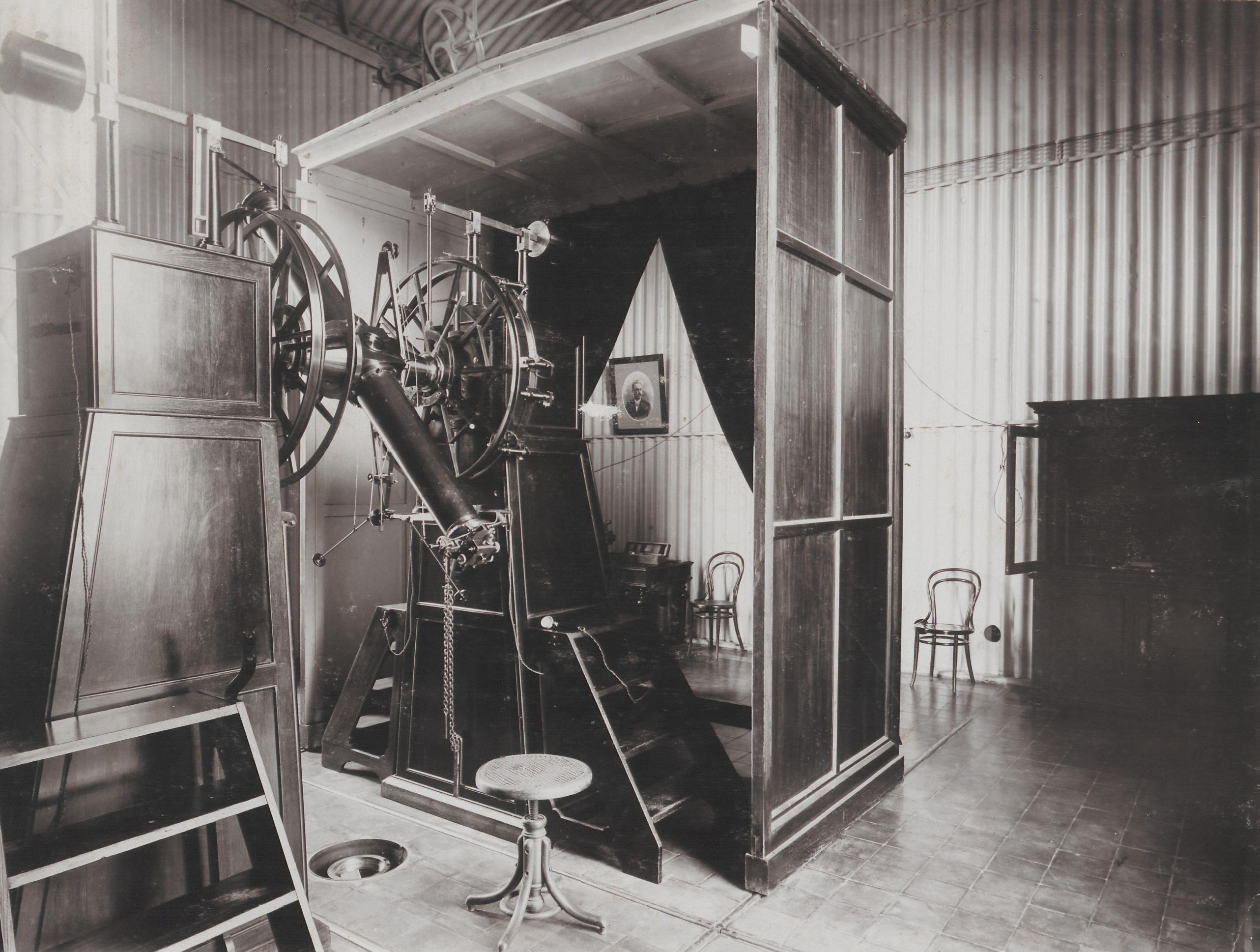
Meridian circle.

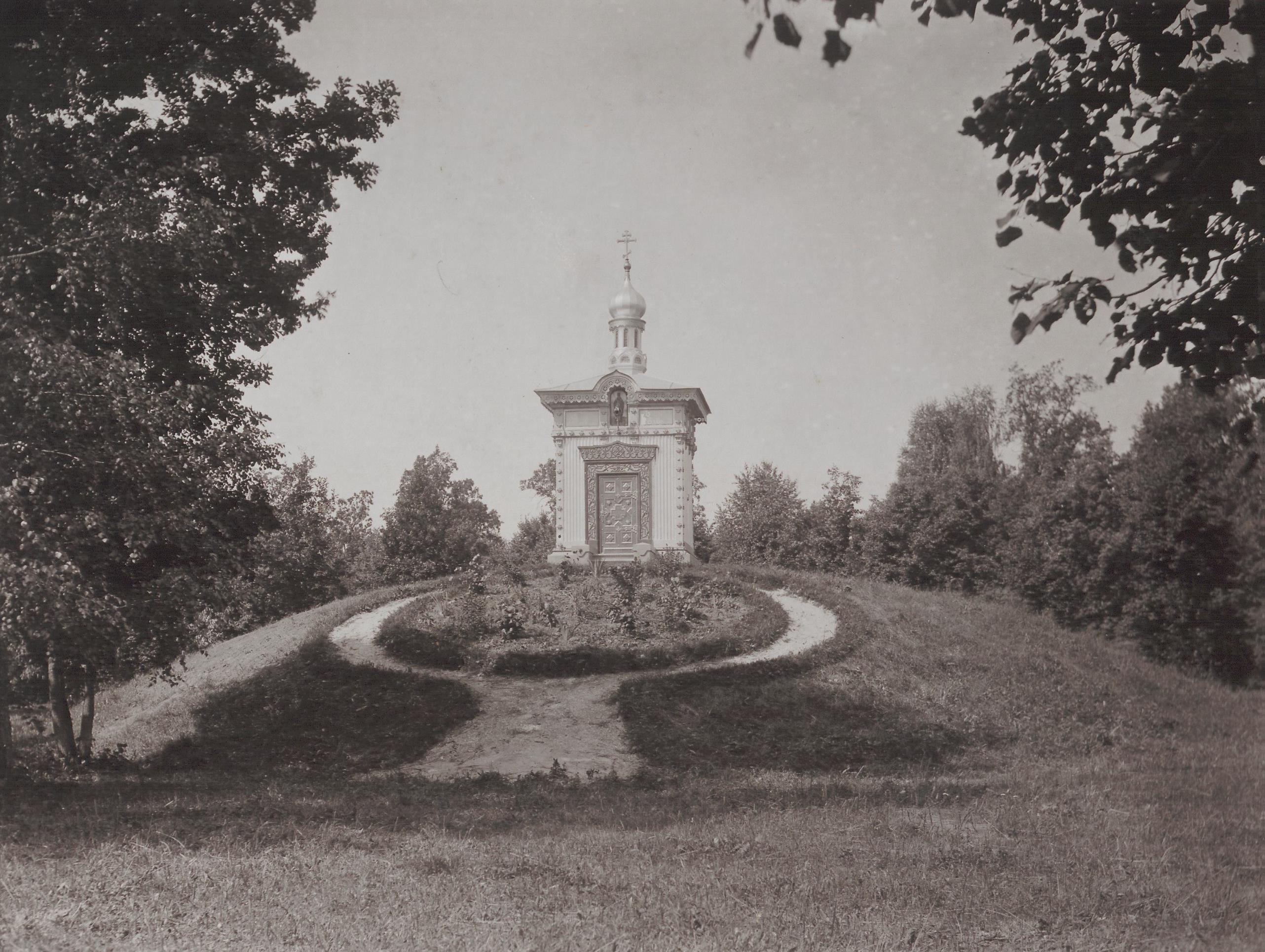
South meridian sign.

== Zelenchukskaya Station ==
Minor planets discovered: 6
see § List of discovered minor planets

The observatory's Zelenchukskaya Station, observatory code 114, abbreviated as "Zelenchukskaya Stn" by the IAU/MPC, is located at 2,047 metres (6,716 ft) altitude near Zelenchukskaya in the North Caucasus region of the Caucasus Mountains, using a 0.3-meter f/7.7 reflector.

The station is known for it numerous cometary observations (see external links) and discoveries of minor planets by Russian amateur astronomer Timur Valer'evič Krjačko. In addition, the MPC directly credits the Zelenchukskaya Station for the discovery of 6 minor planets in 2008 (see list), which includes 212929 Satovski, a main-belt asteroid named after Boris Ivanovich Satovski (1908–1982), a laureate of the USSR State Prize.

Note, the Special Astrophysical Observatory of the Russian Academy of Science (115) with its Large Altazimuth Telescope is also located near Zelenchukskaya.

=== List of discovered minor planets ===
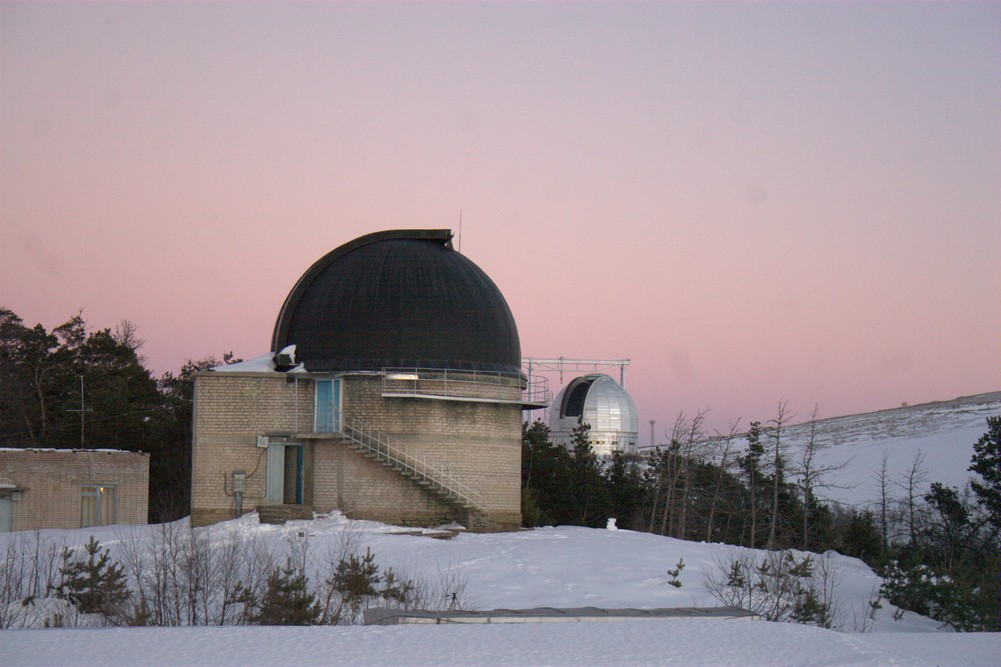
The Zelenchukskaya station

212924 Yurishevchuk	6 January 2008	list
212929 Satovski	15 January 2008	list
325369 Shishilov	29 August 2008	list
360072 Alcimedon	2 September 2008	list
361764 Antonbuslov	6 January 2008	list
381458 Moiseenko	2 September 2008	list

== See also ==
- List of asteroid-discovering observatories
- List of minor planet discoverers § Discovering dedicated institutions
- List of observatory codes
