= Tsander (crater) =

Crater on the Moon

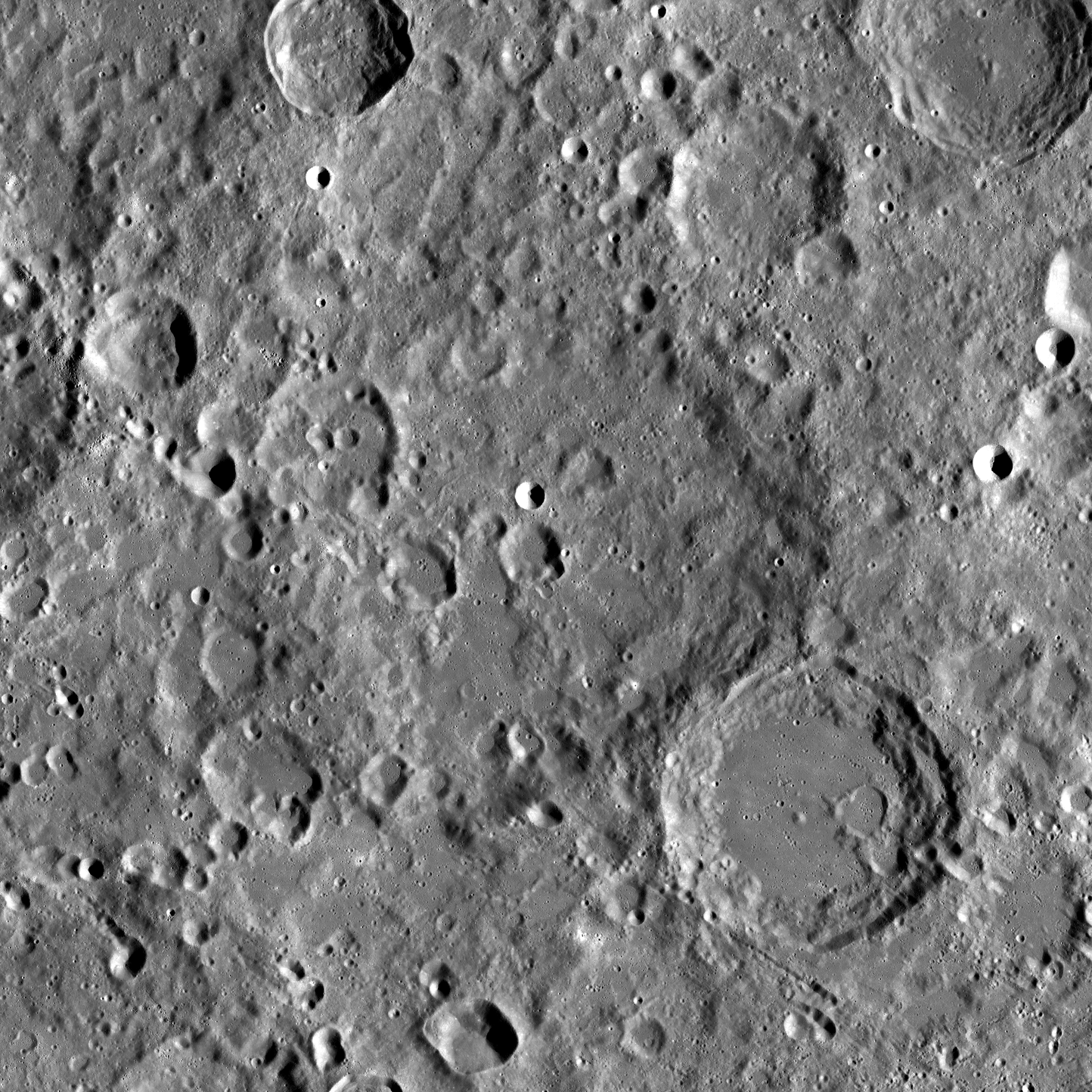
- LRO image (Tsander is heavily eroded large crater in the center)
- Coordinates: 5.39°N 149.69°W
- Diameter: 159.94 km (99.38 mi)
- Depth: Unknown
- Colongitude: 151° at sunrise
- Formation: Pre-Nectarian
- Eponym: Friedrich Zander

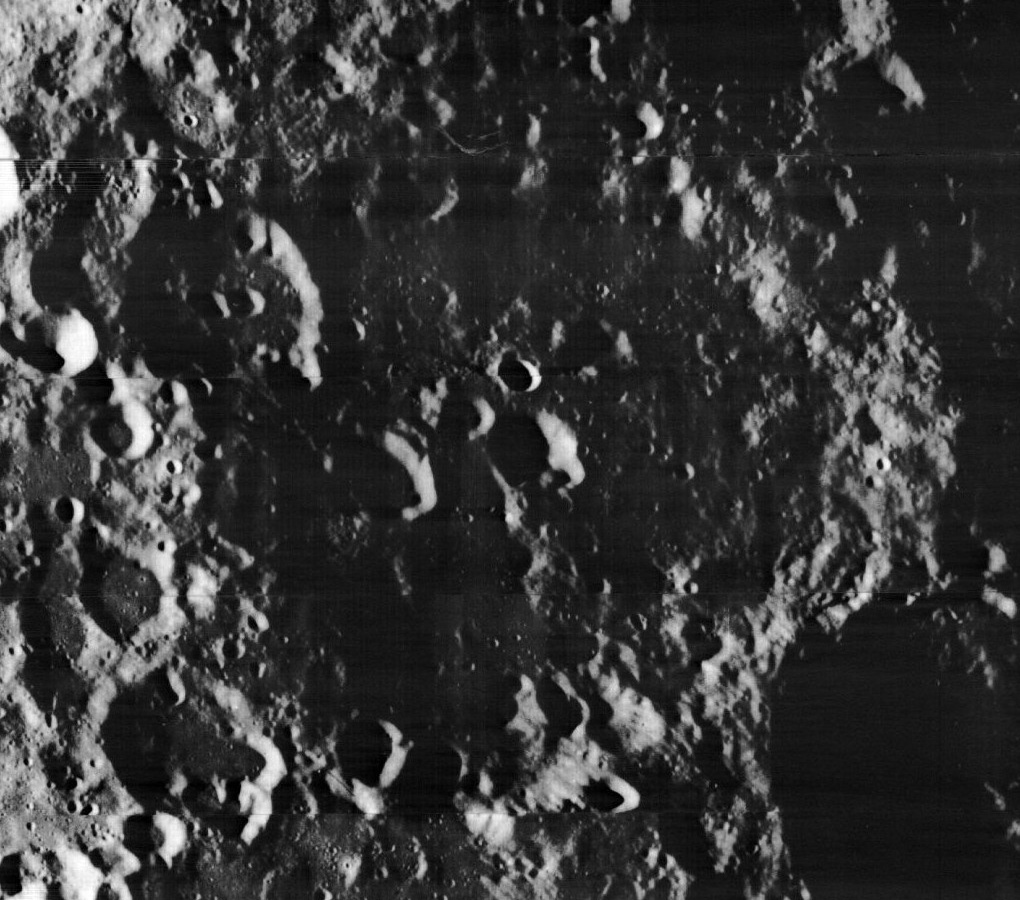
Lunar Orbiter 1 image

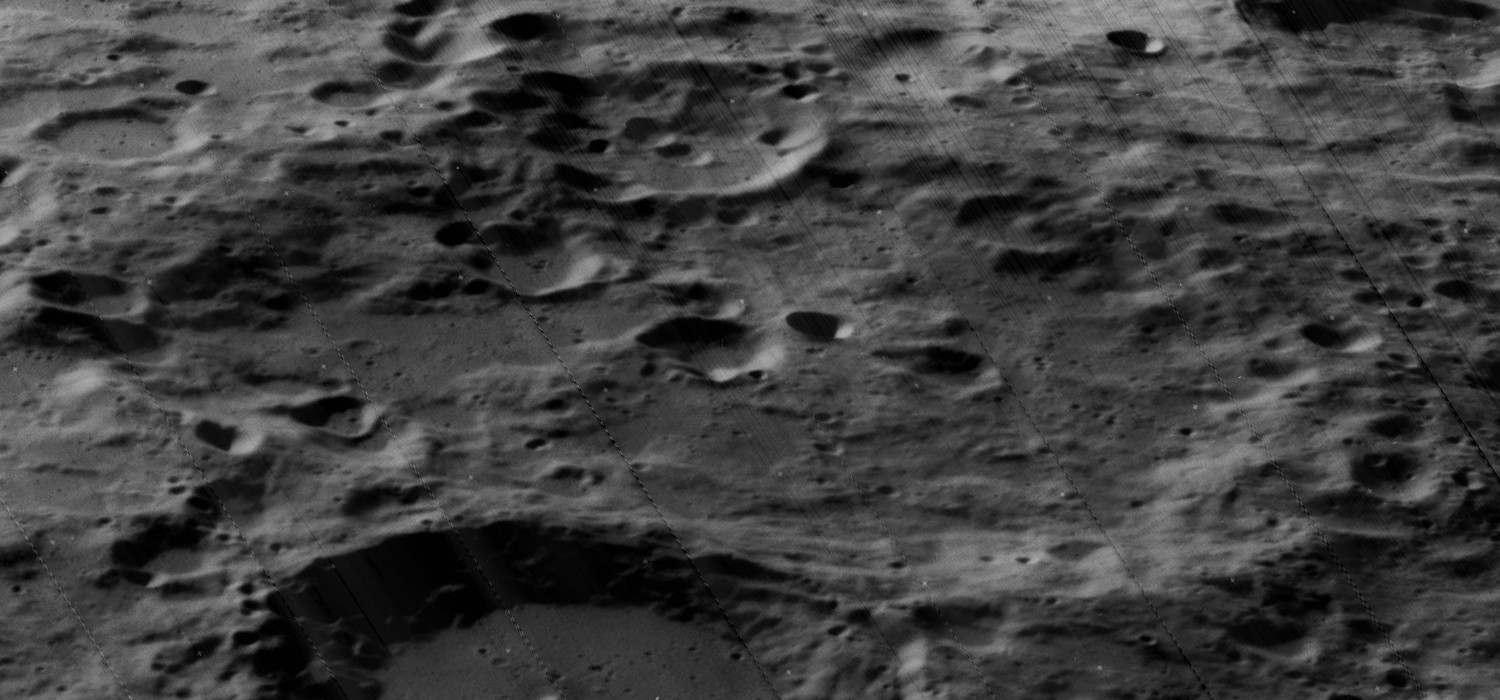
Oblique Lunar Orbiter 5 image

Tsander is a large lunar impact crater on the far side of the Moon.

This is a heavily worn crater formation with an outer rim that has been rendered into an uneven, somewhat circular range due to impact erosion. There is a significant outward bulge along the rim edge to the south-southwest. A smaller crater lies across the rim to the west-northwest. The interior floor has low ridges and uneven areas most likely as the result of large deposits of ejecta. There is a cluster of small craters near the midpoint of the interior, and the worn remains of a pair of older impacts in the north and west.

Along the southeastern outer rim of Tsander is the younger crater Kibal'chich. To the northwest lies Dirichlet, and to the northeast lies Artem'ev. Tsander lies to the southeast of the Dirichlet-Jackson Basin.

This crater takes its name from the Cyrillic rendering of Friedrich Zander, an early developer of rocket engines. Prior to formal naming in 1970 by the IAU, this crater was known as Crater 237.

== Satellite craters ==
By convention these features are identified on lunar maps by placing the letter on the side of the crater midpoint that is closest to Tsander.

| Tsander | Coordinates | Diameter, km |
|---|---|---|
| B | 9.01°N 147.68°W | 55 |
| R | 3.05°N 152.81°W | 34 |
| S | 5.35°N 150.04°W | 18 |
| V | 7.46°N 154.08°W | 35 |
