= Artemʹev (crater) =

Lunar impact crater

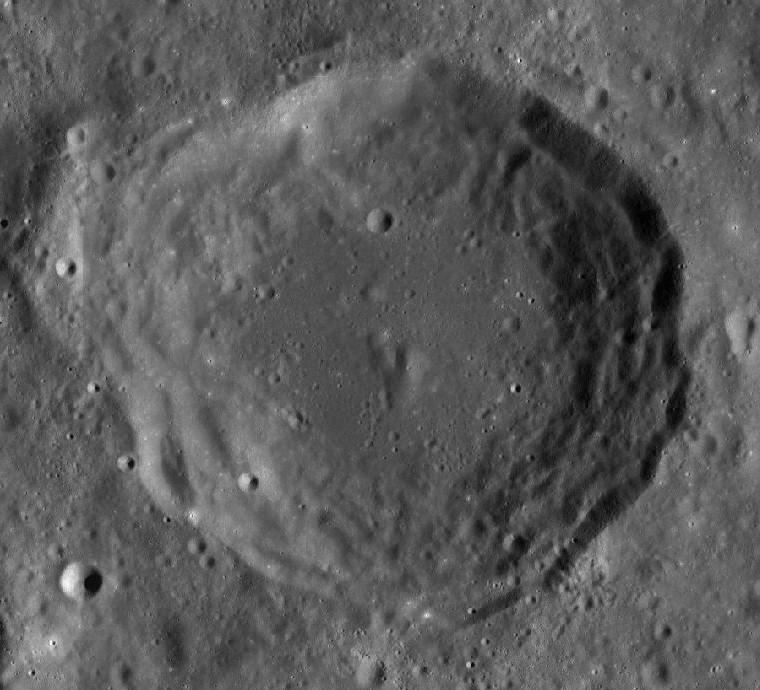
- LRO WAC mosaic
- Coordinates: 10.40°N 145.22°W
- Diameter: 66.39 km (41.25 mi)
- Depth: Unknown
- Colongitude: 146° at sunrise
- Formation: Early Imbrian
- Eponym: Vladimir A. Artemyev

Artemʹev is a lunar impact crater that is located on the far side of the Moon. It dates to the Early Imbrian period of the lunar geologic timescale. The rim of this crater has been modified by subsequent impacts in the vicinity, with an inward bulge along the southwest edge and a worn impact lying across the north rim. The satellite crater Artemʹev G is partly overlain by the southeast rim of Artemʹev. The crater interior is relatively flat, and marked only by tiny craterlets.

The crater Tsander lies to the southwest of Artemʹev. Further to the southeast is the huge walled basin Hertzprung.

This crater is named after Soviet rocket scientist Vladimir A. Artemyev (1885–1962). Its designation was formally adopted by the International Astronomical Union in 1970. Prior to formal naming this crater was known as Crater 239.

== Satellite craters ==
By convention these features are identified on lunar maps by placing the letter on the side of the crater midpoint that is closest to Artemʹev.

Artemʹev	Latitude	Longitude	Diameter
G	10.3° N	142.8° W	60 km
L	8.3° N	143.3° W	30 km

== Gallery ==
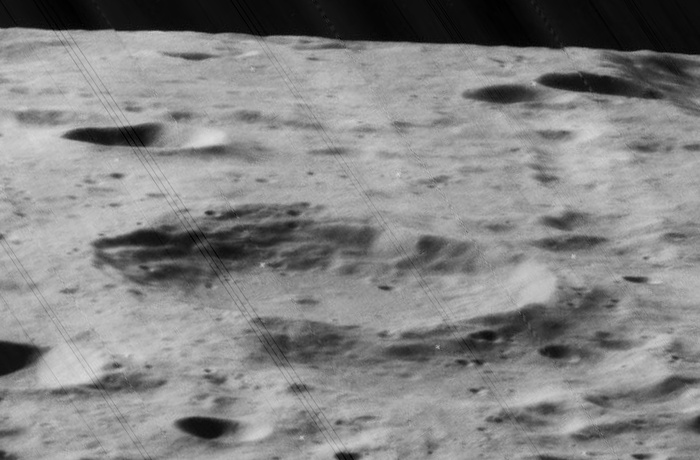
Oblique Lunar Orbiter 5 image

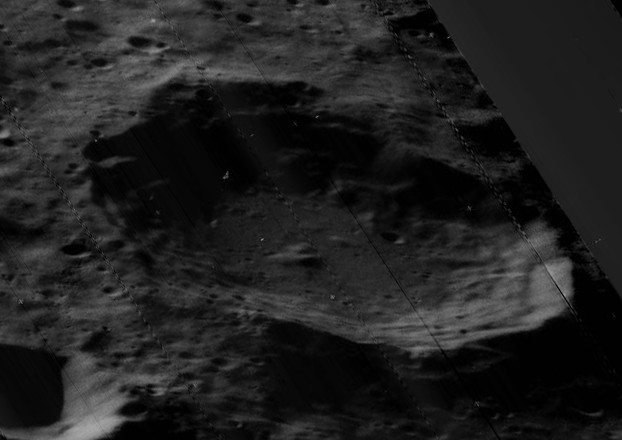
Another view from Lunar Orbiter 5
