= 1957 in spaceflight =

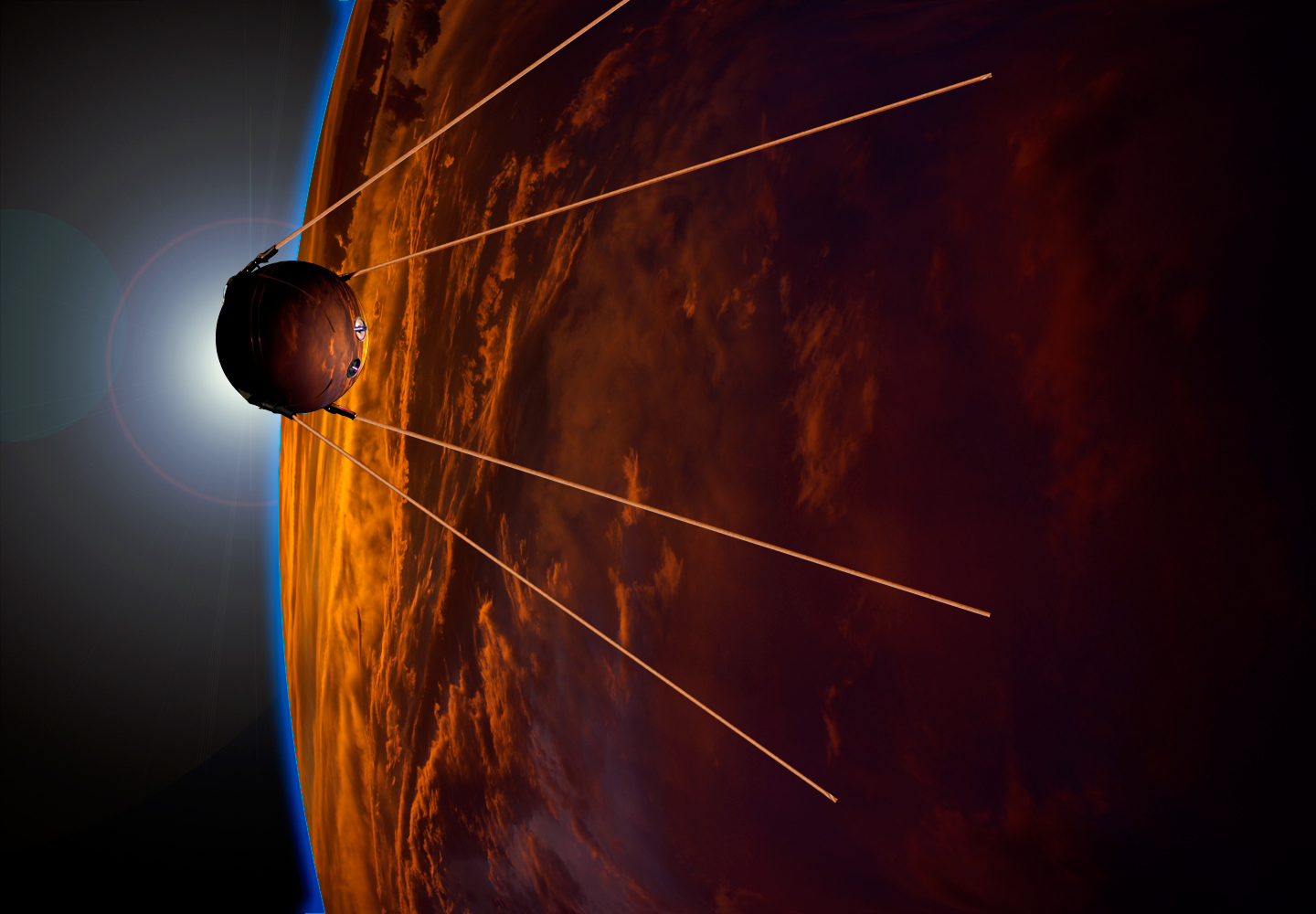
- Artist's impression of Sputnik 1, the first artificial satellite, in orbit

Orbital launches
- First: 4 October
- Last: 6 December
- Total: 3
- Successes: 1
- Failures: 1
- Partial failures: 1
- Catalogued: 2

National firsts
- Spaceflight: Australia; United Kingdom
- Satellite: Soviet Union
- Orbital launch: Soviet Union

Rockets
- Maiden flights: Sputnik-PS 8K71PS; Vanguard
- Retirements: Sputnik-PS 8K71PS

1957 in spaceflight

The first orbital flight of an artificial satellite, Sputnik 1, was launched in October 1957, by the Soviet Union. In November, the second orbital flight took place. The Soviet Union launched the first animal to orbit the Earth, a dog, Laika, who died in orbit a few hours after launch.

- Thor, Atlas, and R-7 rocket families all have maiden flights this year, all three of which will have long legacies for over 50 years.
- Australia and the UK go to space with sounding rockets; first space launches from Australia.
- The R-12 makes its maiden flight.
- The US makes its first orbital attempt and fails (Vanguard TV-3).

== Overview ==
=== First Orbital launch ===
On 4 October, Sputnik 1 was launched from Baikonur Cosmodrome Site 1/5 on a Sputnik rocket, a variant of R-7 rocket. The Successful Insertion of Sputnik 1 into Orbit is marked as the first orbital launch in human history.

A Second satellite Sputnik 2 was also launched on 3 November marking the second orbital launch attempt carried a dog named, Laika.

== Orbital launches ==
- ← Jan
- Feb
- Mar
- Apr
- May
- Jun
- Jul
- Aug
- Sep
- Oct
- Nov
- Dec →

| Date and time (UTC) | Rocket | Flight number | Launch site | | LSP | |
| Date and time (UTC) | Payload (⚀ = CubeSat) | Operator | Orbit | Function | Decay (UTC) | Outcome |
| Date and time (UTC) | Remarks | | | | | |
|---|---|---|---|---|---|---|
=== October ===
| 4 October; 19:28:34 | (Soviet Union) Sputnik-PS | M1-PS | (Soviet Union) Baikonur Site 1/5 | | (Soviet Union) MVS | |
| 4 October; 19:28:34 | (Soviet Union) Sputnik 1 (PS-1 №1) | OKB-1 | Low Earth | Technology demonstration | 4 January 1958 | Successful |
| 4 October; 19:28:34 | First orbital launch, first artificial satellite of Earth, Maiden flight of the Sputnik-PS rocket | | | | | |
← Jan; Feb; Mar; Apr; May; Jun; Jul; Aug; Sep; Oct; Nov; Dec →; === November ===
| 3 November; 02:30:42 | (Soviet Union) Sputnik-PS | M1-2PS | (Soviet Union) Baikonur Site 1/5 | | (Soviet Union) MVS | |
| 3 November; 02:30:42 | (Soviet Union) Sputnik 2 (PS-2 №1) | OKB-1 | Low Earth | Biological research | 14 April 1958 | Partial spacecraft failure |
| 3 November; 02:30:42 | Carried Laika, the first animal in orbit. Laika died prior to completion of experiments. Final flight of the Sputnik-PS. | | | | | |
← Jan; Feb; Mar; Apr; May; Jun; Jul; Aug; Sep; Oct; Nov; Dec →; === December ===
| 6 December; 16:44:35 | (United States) Vanguard | TV-3 | (United States) Cape Canaveral LC-18A | | (United States) US Navy | |
| 6 December; 16:44:35 | (United States) Vanguard (Test Satellite F) | NRL | Intended: Medium Earth | Geodesy | 6 December | Launch failure |
| 6 December; 16:44:35 | First US orbital launch attempt, and first orbital launch attempt failure. Lost thrust and exploded on launch pad after 2 seconds. | | | | | |
← Jan; Feb; Mar; Apr; May; Jun; Jul; Aug; Sep; Oct; Nov; Dec →

- ← Jan
- Feb
- Mar
- Apr
- May
- Jun
- Jul
- Aug
- Sep
- Oct
- Nov
- Dec →

== Suborbital flights ==
| Date and time (UTC) | Rocket | Flight number | Launch site | | LSP | |
| Date and time (UTC) | Payload (⚀ = CubeSat) | Operator | Orbit | Function | Decay (UTC) | Outcome |
| Date and time (UTC) | Remarks | | | | | |
|---|---|---|---|---|---|---|
| 8 January | (United States) X-17 | | (United States) Cape Canaveral LC-3 | | (United States) US Air Force | |
| 8 January | | ARDC | Suborbital | REV test | 8 January | Successful |
| 8 January | Apogee: 140 kilometres (87 mi) | | | | | |
| 13 January | (Soviet Union) R-1 | | (Soviet Union) Kapustin Yar | | (Soviet Union) OKB-1 | |
| 13 January | | OKB-1 | Suborbital | Missile test | 13 January | Successful |
| 14 January | (Soviet Union) R-1 | | (Soviet Union) Kapustin Yar | | (Soviet Union) OKB-1 | |
| 14 January | | OKB-1 | Suborbital | Missile test | 14 January | Successful |
| 15 January | (United States) X-17 | | (United States) Cape Canaveral LC-3 | | (United States) US Air Force | |
| 15 January | | ARDC | Suborbital | REV test | 15 January | Launch failure |
| 15 January | Apogee: 100 kilometres (62 mi) | | | | | |
| 19 January | (Soviet Union) R-5M | | (Soviet Union) Kapustin Yar | | (Soviet Union) OKB-1 | |
| 19 January | | MVS | Suborbital | Nuclear weapon test | 19 January | Successful |
| 24 January | (United States) HJ-Nike | | (United States) Wallops Island | | (United States) NACA | |
| 24 January | | NACA | Suborbital | Cone REV test | 24 January | Successful |
| 24 January | Apogee: 10 kilometres (6.2 mi) | | | | | |
| 26 January | (United States) XSM-75 Thor | 101 | (United States) Cape Canaveral LC-17B | | (United States) US Air Force | |
| 26 January | | ARDC | Suborbital | Missile test | 26 January | Launch failure |
| 26 January | Maiden launch of the SM-75 Thor missile, designated XSM-75 to indicate it was an experimental R&D launch; exploded on launch pad | | | | | |
| 29 January | (United States) X-17 | | (United States) Cape Canaveral LC-3 | | (United States) US Air Force | |
| 29 January | | ARDC | Suborbital | REV test | 29 January | Launch failure |
| 29 January | Apogee: 0 kilometres (0 mi) | | | | | |
| 2 February; 08:05 | (United States) Aerobee AJ10-34 | USAF 76 | (United States) Holloman LC-A | | (United States) US Air Force | |
| 2 February; 08:05 | (United States) Firefly | AFCRC | Suborbital | Aeronomy | 2 February | Successful |
| 2 February; 08:05 | Apogee: 143 kilometres (89 mi) | | | | | |
| 7 February | (United States) X-17 | | (United States) Cape Canaveral LC-3 | | (United States) US Air Force | |
| 7 February | | ARDC | Suborbital | REV test | 7 February | Successful |
| 7 February | Apogee: 107 kilometres (66 mi) | | | | | |
| 12 February; 20:30 | (United States) Loki Rockoon | II5.097 | Guam | | (United States) University of Iowa | |
| 12 February; 20:30 | | University of Iowa | Suborbital | Fields | 12 February | Successful |
| 12 February; 20:30 | Apogee: 75 kilometres (47 mi) | | | | | |
| 13 February; 01:51 | (United Kingdom) Skylark (Raven 1) | SL01 | (Australia) Woomera LA-2 SL | | (Australia) WRE / (United Kingdom) RAE | |
| 13 February; 01:51 | | WRE / RAE | Suborbital | Test flight | 13 February | Successful |
| 13 February; 01:51 | Apogee: 12 kilometres (7.5 mi), maiden flight of the Skylark | | | | | |
| 14 February; 20:05 | (United States) Loki Rockoon | II5.098 | Guam | | (United States) University of Iowa | |
| 14 February; 20:05 | | University of Iowa | Suborbital | Fields | 14 February | Successful |
| 14 February; 20:05 | Apogee: 75 kilometres (47 mi) | | | | | |
| 14 February | (United States) X-17 | | (United States) Cape Canaveral LC-3 | | (United States) US Air Force | |
| 14 February | | ARDC | Suborbital | REV test | 14 February | Successful |
| 14 February | Apogee: 141 kilometres (88 mi) | | | | | |
| 17 February; 21:36 | (United States) Loki Rockoon | II5.099 | Guam | | (United States) University of Iowa | |
| 17 February; 21:36 | | University of Iowa | Suborbital | Fields | 17 February | Successful |
| 17 February; 21:36 | Apogee: 75 kilometres (47 mi) | | | | | |
| 19 February | (Soviet Union) R-1 | | (Soviet Union) Kapustin Yar | | (Soviet Union) OKB-1 | |
| 19 February | | OKB-1 | Suborbital | Missile test | 19 February | Successful |
| 28 February | (Soviet Union) R-2 | | (Soviet Union) Kapustin Yar | | (Soviet Union) OKB-1 | |
| 28 February | | OKB-1 | Suborbital | Missile test | 28 February | Successful |
| 1 March | (United States) X-17 | | (United States) Cape Canaveral LC-3 | | (United States) US Air Force | |
| 1 March | | ARDC | Suborbital | REV test | 1 March | Successful |
| 1 March | Apogee: 151 kilometres (94 mi) | | | | | |
| 1 March; 21:51 | (United States) SM-78 Jupiter | | (United States) Cape Canaveral LC-5 | | (United States) US Air Force | |
| 1 March; 21:51 | | ABMA | Suborbital | Missile test | 1 March | Launch failure |
| 1 March; 21:51 | Apogee: 14 kilometres (8.7 mi), maiden flight of the SM-78 Jupiter missile; overheated and disintegrated | | | | | |
| 11 March | (Soviet Union) R-5M | | (Soviet Union) Kapustin Yar | | (Soviet Union) OKB-1 | |
| 11 March | | OKB-1 | Suborbital | Missile test | 11 March | Successful |
| 11 March | (United States) X-17 | | (United States) Cape Canaveral LC-3 | | (United States) US Air Force | |
| 11 March | | ARDC | Suborbital | REV test | 11 March | Successful |
| 11 March | Apogee: 134 kilometres (83 mi) | | | | | |
| 18 March | (Soviet Union) R-5M | | (Soviet Union) Kapustin Yar | | (Soviet Union) OKB-1 | |
| 18 March | | OKB-1 | Suborbital | Missile test | 18 March | Successful |
| 18 March | (Soviet Union) R-5M | | (Soviet Union) Kapustin Yar | | (Soviet Union) OKB-1 | |
| 18 March | | OKB-1 | Suborbital | Missile test | 18 March | Successful |
| 18 March | Live warhead used | | | | | |
| 21 March | (Soviet Union) R-5M | | (Soviet Union) Kapustin Yar | | (Soviet Union) OKB-1 | |
| 21 March | | OKB-1 | Suborbital | Missile test | 21 March | Successful |
| 21 March | (United States) X-17 | | (United States) Cape Canaveral LC-3 | | (United States) US Air Force | |
| 21 March | | ARDC | Suborbital | REV test | 21 March | Successful |
| 21 March | Apogee: 103 kilometres (64 mi) | | | | | |
| 28 March | (Soviet Union) R-5M | | (Soviet Union) Kapustin Yar | | (Soviet Union) OKB-1 | |
| 28 March | | OKB-1 | Suborbital | Missile test | 28 March | Successful |
| 29 March; 04:51 | (United States) Aerobee RTV-N-10c | NRL 31 | (United States) White Sands LC-35 | | (United States) US Navy | |
| 29 March; 04:51 | | NRL | Suborbital | UV Astronomy | 29 March | Successful |
| 29 March; 04:51 | Apogee: 135 kilometres (84 mi), final flight of the Aerobee RTV-N-10c | | | | | |
| 10 April | (United States) HJ-Nike | | (United States) Wallops Island | | (United States) NACA | |
| 10 April | | NACA | Suborbital | Heat transfer REV test | 10 April | Successful |
| 11 April; 16:31 | (United States) Aerobee Hi | NRL 40 | (United States) White Sands LC-35 | | (United States) US Navy | |
| 11 April; 16:31 | | NRL | Suborbital | Vanguard instrumentation test | 11 April | Successful |
| 11 April; 16:31 | Apogee: 204 kilometres (127 mi), Navy variant designation: RV-N-13c; tested equipment for the Vanguard rocket | | | | | |
| 12 April | (Soviet Union) R-2A | | (Soviet Union) Kapustin Yar | | (Soviet Union) OKB-1 | |
| 12 April | | OKB-1 | Suborbital | Test flight | 12 April | Successful |
| 12 April | Maiden flight of the R-2A, a scientific variant of the R-2 | | | | | |
| 13 April | (United States) Polaris FTV-5 | | (United States) Cape Canaveral LC-3 | | (United States) US Navy | |
| 13 April | | USNSPO | Suborbital | REV test | 13 April | Launch failure |
| 13 April | Technology test for development of the UGM-27 Polaris; maiden flight of the Polaris FTV-5 | | | | | |
| 14 April | (Soviet Union) R-2A | | (Soviet Union) Kapustin Yar | | (Soviet Union) OKB-1 | |
| 14 April | | OKB-1 | Suborbital | Test flight | 14 April | Successful |
| 20 April; 04:31 | (United States) XSM-75 Thor | 102 | (United States) Cape Canaveral LC-17B | | (United States) US Air Force | |
| 20 April; 04:31 | | ARDC | Suborbital | Missile test | 20 April | Launch failure |
| 20 April; 04:31 | Destroyed by range safety officer after console error gave erroneous indications that the missile was off course | | | | | |
| 26 April; 20:12 | (United States) SM-78 Jupiter | | (United States) Cape Canaveral LC-5 | | (United States) US Air Force | |
| 26 April; 20:12 | | ABMA | Suborbital | Test flight | 26 April | Partial failure |
| 26 April; 20:12 | Apogee: 18 kilometres (11 mi) | | | | | |
| 30 April; 15:10 | (United States) Aerobee Hi | NRL 41 | (United States) White Sands LC-35 | | (United States) US Navy | |
| 30 April; 15:10 | | NRL | Suborbital | Meteorite research | 30 April | Successful |
| 30 April; 15:10 | Apogee: 289 kilometres (180 mi), Navy variant designation: RV-N-13c | | | | | |
| 1 May; 06:29 | (United States) Viking (second model) | | (United States) Cape Canaveral LC-18A | | (United States) US Navy | |
| 1 May; 06:29 | (United States) Vanguard TV-1 | NRL | Suborbital | Vanguard third stage test | 1 May | Successful |
| 1 May; 06:29 | Apogee: 195 kilometres (121 mi), final flight of the Viking; a second stage tested the future Vanguard third stage | | | | | |
| 3 May; 14:04 | (United States) Aerobee Hi | NRL 44 | (United States) White Sands LC-35 | | (United States) US Navy | |
| 3 May; 14:04 | | NRL | Suborbital | Solar UV | 3 May | Successful |
| 3 May; 14:04 | Apogee: 204 kilometres (127 mi), Navy variant designation: RV-N-13c | | | | | |
| 15 May; 07:55 | (United States) Jupiter-C | | (United States) Cape Canaveral LC-6 | | (United States) ABMA | |
| 15 May; 07:55 | | ABMA | Suborbital | Nose cone re-entry test | 15 May | Launch failure |
| 15 May; 07:55 | Apogee: 655 kilometres (407 mi); gyroscope malfunctioned 134 seconds after launch and the nose cone was not recovered, but instruments indicated that the test may have been successful | | | | | |
| 15 May; 16:01 | (Soviet Union) R-7 | | (Soviet Union) Baikonur Site 1/5 | | (Soviet Union) MVS | |
| 15 May; 16:01 | | MVS | Suborbital | Missile test | 15 May | Launch failure |
| 15 May; 16:01 | Maiden flight of the R-7 and first launch of an ICBM. Engine fire in Block D booster rocket at liftoff, followed by premature separation 98 seconds after launch. | | | | | |
| 16 May; 02:14 | (Soviet Union) R-2A | | (Soviet Union) Kapustin Yar | | (Soviet Union) OKB-1 | |
| 16 May; 02:14 | | OKB-1 / RAS | Suborbital | Test flight | 16 May | Successful |
| 16 May; 03:18 | (Soviet Union) R-2A | | (Soviet Union) Kapustin Yar | | (Soviet Union) OKB-1 | |
| 16 May; 03:18 | | RAS | Suborbital | Biological | 16 May | Successful |
| 16 May; 03:18 | Apogee: 212 kilometres (132 mi), carried dogs | | | | | |
| 22 May; 05:20 | (United Kingdom) Skylark (Raven 1) | SL02 | (Australia) Woomera LA-2 SL | | (Australia) WRE / (United Kingdom) RAE | |
| 22 May; 05:20 | | WRE / RAE | Suborbital | Test flight | 22 May | Successful |
| 22 May; 05:20 | Apogee: 75 kilometres (47 mi) | | | | | |
| 22 May | (United States) XSM-75 Thor | 103 | (United States) Cape Canaveral LC-17B | | (United States) US Air Force | |
| 22 May | | ARDC | Suborbital | Missile test | 22 May | Launch failure |
| 22 May | Exploded on pad after valve malfunction caused pressure build up | | | | | |
| 24 May | (Soviet Union) R-2A | | (Soviet Union) Kapustin Yar | | (Soviet Union) OKB-1 | |
| 24 May | | RAS | Suborbital | | 24 May | Successful |
| 29 May | (Soviet Union) R-2 | | (Soviet Union) Kapustin Yar | | (Soviet Union) OKB-1 | |
| 29 May | | OKB-1 | Suborbital | Missile test | 29 May | Successful |
| 31 May; 18:08 | (United States) SM-78 Jupiter | | (United States) Cape Canaveral LC-5 | | (United States) US Air Force | |
| 31 May; 18:08 | | ABMA | Suborbital | Missile test | 31 May | Successful |
| 31 May; 18:08 | Apogee: 402 to 482 kilometres (250 to 300 mi), first successful IRBM launched in the western world | | | | | |
| June | (Soviet Union) R-1 | | (Soviet Union) Kapustin Yar | | (Soviet Union) OKB-1 | |
| June | | OKB-1 | Suborbital | Missile test | Same day | Successful |
| June | (Soviet Union) R-1 | | (Soviet Union) Kapustin Yar | | (Soviet Union) OKB-1 | |
| June | | OKB-1 | Suborbital | Missile test | Same day | Successful |
| 5 June | (Soviet Union) R-2 | | (Soviet Union) Kapustin Yar | | (Soviet Union) OKB-1 | |
| 5 June | | OKB-1 | Suborbital | Missile test | 5 June | Successful |
| 7 June | (Soviet Union) R-2 | | (Soviet Union) Kapustin Yar | | (Soviet Union) OKB-1 | |
| 7 June | | OKB-1 | Suborbital | Missile test | 7 June | Successful |
| 7 June | (Soviet Union) R-2A | | (Soviet Union) Kapustin Yar | | (Soviet Union) OKB-1 | |
| 7 June | | OKB-1 | Suborbital | ABM target | 7 June | Successful |
| 10 June | (Soviet Union) R-2A | | (Soviet Union) Kapustin Yar | | (Soviet Union) OKB-1 | |
| 10 June | | OKB-1 | Suborbital | ABM target | 10 June | Successful |
| 11 June; 19:37 | (United States) XSM-65A Atlas | 4A | (United States) Cape Canaveral LC-14 | | (United States) US Air Force | |
| 11 June; 19:37 | | ARDC | Suborbital | Test flight | 11 June | Partial failure |
| 11 June; 19:37 | Apogee: 3 kilometres (1.9 mi), maiden flight of the XSM-65A Atlas missile; destroyed by range safety after fuel system malfunction, but succeeded at other primary mission goals including launch mechanisms, airframe integrity, subsystems performance, and operating procedures | | | | | |
| 14 June | (Soviet Union) R-5M | | (Soviet Union) Kapustin Yar | | (Soviet Union) OKB-1 | |
| 14 June | (Soviet Union) Vibrator | OKB-1 | Suborbital | Missile test | 14 June | Successful |
| 14 June | The Vibrator system was a non-contact explosive device | | | | | |
| 18 June; 14:00 | (United States) Aerobee Hi | USAF 78 | (United States) Holloman LC-A | | (United States) US Air Force | |
| 18 June; 14:00 | | AFCRC / University of Utah | Suborbital | Ionospheric | 18 June | Successful |
| 18 June; 14:00 | Apogee: 171 kilometres (106 mi) | | | | | |
| 22 June | (Soviet Union) R-2A | | (Soviet Union) Kapustin Yar | | (Soviet Union) OKB-1 | |
| 22 June | | OKB-1 | Suborbital | ABM target | 22 June | Successful |
| 22 June | (Soviet Union) R-12 | LKI1-1 | (Soviet Union) Kapustin Yar | | (Soviet Union) MVS | |
| 22 June | | MVS | Suborbital | Missile test | 22 June | Successful |
| 22 June | Maiden flight of the R-12 missile | | | | | |
| 23 June | (Soviet Union) R-2A | | (Soviet Union) Kapustin Yar | | (Soviet Union) OKB-1 | |
| 23 June | | OKB-1 | Suborbital | ABM target | 23 June | Successful |
| 25 June; 14:07 | (United States) Aerobee Hi | USAF 79 | (United States) Holloman LC-A | | (United States) US Air Force | |
| 25 June; 14:07 | | AFCRC / University of Utah | Suborbital | Ionospheric | 25 June | Successful |
| 25 June; 14:07 | Apogee: 202 kilometres (126 mi) | | | | | |
| 28 June | (Soviet Union) R-2A | | (Soviet Union) Kapustin Yar | | (Soviet Union) OKB-1 | |
| 28 June | | OKB-1 | Suborbital | ABM target | 28 June | Successful |
| 28 June | (Soviet Union) R-5M | | (Soviet Union) Kapustin Yar | | (Soviet Union) OKB-1 | |
| 28 June | | OKB-1 | Suborbital | Missile test | 28 June | Successful |
| 28 June | (Soviet Union) R-5M | | (Soviet Union) Kapustin Yar | | (Soviet Union) OKB-1 | |
| 28 June | (Soviet Union) Vibrator | OKB-1 | Suborbital | Missile test | 28 June | Successful |
| 28 June | The Vibrator system was a non-contact explosive device | | | | | |
| 29 June | (Soviet Union) R-2A | | (Soviet Union) Kapustin Yar | | (Soviet Union) OKB-1 | |
| 29 June | | OKB-1 | Suborbital | ABM target | 29 June | Successful |
| 1 July; 19:00 | (United States) Nike-Deacon | NN7.37F | (United States) San Nicolas | | (United States) US Navy | |
| 1 July; 19:00 | | NRL | Suborbital | Solar UV / X-ray | 1 July | Successful |
| 1 July; 19:00 | Apogee: 93 kilometres (58 mi) | | | | | |
| 3 July; 16:29 | (United States) Nike-Deacon | NN7.38F | (United States) San Nicolas | | (United States) US Navy | |
| 3 July; 16:29 | | NRL | Suborbital | Solar UV / X-ray | 3 July | Successful |
| 3 July; 16:29 | Apogee: 113 kilometres (70 mi) | | | | | |
| 4 July | (Soviet Union) R-2A | | (Soviet Union) Kapustin Yar | | (Soviet Union) OKB-1 | |
| 4 July | | OKB-1 | Suborbital | ABM target | 4 July | Successful |
| 4 July | (Soviet Union) R-12 | LKI1-2 | (Soviet Union) Kapustin Yar | | (Soviet Union) MVS | |
| 4 July | | MVS | Suborbital | Missile test | 4 July | Successful |
| 4 July; 18:15:40 | (United States) Aerobee Hi | NN3.08F | (Canada) Churchill | | (United States) US Navy | |
| 4 July; 18:15:40 | | NRL | Suborbital | Ionospheric | 4 July | Successful |
| 4 July; 18:15:40 | Apogee: 237 kilometres (147 mi) | | | | | |
| 5 July | (Soviet Union) R-2A | | (Soviet Union) Kapustin Yar | | (Soviet Union) OKB-1 | |
| 5 July | | OKB-1 | Suborbital | ABM target | 5 July | Successful |
| 5 July; 06:17:56 | (United States) Aerobee Hi | NN3.09F | (Canada) Churchill | | (United States) US Navy | |
| 5 July; 06:17:56 | | NRL | Suborbital | Ionospheric | 5 July | Launch failure |
| 5 July; 06:17:56 | Apogee: 16 kilometres (9.9 mi) | | | | | |
| 7 July | (Soviet Union) R-2 | | (Soviet Union) Kapustin Yar | | (Soviet Union) OKB-1 | |
| 7 July | | OKB-1 | Suborbital | Missile test | 7 July | Successful |
| 8 July | (Soviet Union) R-1 | | (Soviet Union) Kapustin Yar | | (Soviet Union) OKB-1 | |
| 8 July | | OKB-1 | Suborbital | Missile test | 8 July | Successful |
| 9 July | (Soviet Union) R-1 | | (Soviet Union) Kapustin Yar | | (Soviet Union) OKB-1 | |
| 9 July | | OKB-1 | Suborbital | Missile test | 9 July | Successful |
| 9 July | (Soviet Union) R-2 | | (Soviet Union) Kapustin Yar | | (Soviet Union) OKB-1 | |
| 9 July | | OKB-1 | Suborbital | Missile test | 9 July | Successful |
| 9 July | (Soviet Union) R-5M | | (Soviet Union) Kapustin Yar | | (Soviet Union) OKB-1 | |
| 9 July | | OKB-1 | Suborbital | Missile test | 9 July | Successful |
| 10 July | (Soviet Union) R-1 | | (Soviet Union) Kapustin Yar | | (Soviet Union) OKB-1 | |
| 10 July | | OKB-1 | Suborbital | Missile test | 10 July | Successful |
| 10 July | (Soviet Union) R-2 | | (Soviet Union) Kapustin Yar | | (Soviet Union) OKB-1 | |
| 10 July | | OKB-1 | Suborbital | Missile test | 10 July | Successful |
| 12 July; 12:53 | (Soviet Union) R-7 | | (Soviet Union) Baikonur Site 1/5 | | (Soviet Union) MVS | |
| 12 July; 12:53 | | MVS | Suborbital | Missile test | 12 July | Launch failure |
| 12 July; 12:53 | Control system short-circuited resulting in loss of control, boosters fell off 33 seconds after launch | | | | | |
| 13 July | (Soviet Union) R-1 | | (Soviet Union) Kapustin Yar | | (Soviet Union) OKB-1 | |
| 13 July | | OKB-1 | Suborbital | Missile test | 13 July | Successful |
| 13 July | (Soviet Union) R-12 | LKI1-3 | (Soviet Union) Kapustin Yar | | (Soviet Union) MVS | |
| 13 July | | MVS | Suborbital | Missile test | 13 July | Successful |
| 15 July; 21:23 | (United States) Nike-Deacon | NN7.39F | (United States) San Nicolas | | (United States) US Navy | |
| 15 July; 21:23 | | NRL | Suborbital | Solar UV / X-ray | 15 July | Launch failure |
| 15 July; 21:23 | Apogee: 28 kilometres (17 mi) | | | | | |
| 16 July; 13:30 | (United States) Aerobee RTV-A-1a | USAF 80 | (United States) Holloman LC-A | | (United States) US Air Force | |
| 16 July; 13:30 | | AFCRC | Suborbital | Meteorite research | 16 July | Successful |
| 16 July; 13:30 | Apogee: 122 kilometres (76 mi), final known flight of the Aerobee RTV-A-1a | | | | | |
| 18 July | (Soviet Union) R-2 | | (Soviet Union) Kapustin Yar | | (Soviet Union) OKB-1 | |
| 18 July | | OKB-1 | Suborbital | Missile test | 18 July | Successful |
| 18 July | (Soviet Union) R-5M | | (Soviet Union) Kapustin Yar | | (Soviet Union) OKB-1 | |
| 18 July | | OKB-1 | Suborbital | Missile test | 18 July | Successful |
| 18 July; 14:30 | (United States) Aerobee (unknown type) | USAF 81 | (United States) Holloman LC-A | | (United States) US Air Force | |
| 18 July; 14:30 | | AFCRC | Suborbital | Meteorite research | 18 July | Launch failure |
| 19 July | (Soviet Union) R-2 | | (Soviet Union) Kapustin Yar | | (Soviet Union) OKB-1 | |
| 19 July | | OKB-1 | Suborbital | Missile test | 19 July | Successful |
| 19 July | (United States) Polaris FTV-3 | | (United States) Cape Canaveral LC-3 | | (United States) US Navy | |
| 19 July | | USNSPO | Suborbital | REV test | 19 July | Successful |
| 19 July | Apogee: 130 kilometres (81 mi), technology test for development of the UGM-27 Polaris; maiden flight of the Polaris FTV-3 | | | | | |
| 22 July | (Soviet Union) R-2 | | (Soviet Union) Kapustin Yar | | (Soviet Union) OKB-1 | |
| 22 July | | OKB-1 | Suborbital | Missile test | 22 July | Successful |
| 22 July; 04:16:28 | (United States) Aerobee (unknown type) | SM1.02 | (Canada) Churchill | | (United States) US Army | |
| 22 July; 04:16:28 | (United States) Grenades | SCEL / University of Michigan | Suborbital | Aeronomy | 22 July | Successful |
| 22 July; 04:16:28 | Apogee: 92 kilometres (57 mi) | | | | | |
| 22 July | (United States) X-17 | | (United States) Cape Canaveral LC-3 | | (United States) US Air Force | |
| 22 July | | ARDC | Suborbital | REV test | 22 July | Successful |
| 22 July | Apogee: 114 kilometres (71 mi) | | | | | |
| 23 July; 03:02 | (United Kingdom) Skylark (Raven 1) | SL03 | (Australia) Woomera LA-2 SL | | (Australia) WRE / (United Kingdom) RAE | |
| 23 July; 03:02 | | RAE / QUB | Suborbital | Test flight / Airglow | 23 July | Successful |
| 23 July; 03:02 | Apogee: 85 kilometres (53 mi) | | | | | |
| 23 July; 23:31:52 | (United States) Nike-Deacon | NN7.40F | (United States) San Nicolas | | (United States) US Navy | |
| 23 July; 23:31:52 | | NRL | Suborbital | Solar UV / X-ray | 23 July | Successful |
| 23 July; 23:31:52 | Apogee: 129 kilometres (80 mi) | | | | | |
| 24 July | (Soviet Union) R-1 | | (Soviet Union) Kapustin Yar | | (Soviet Union) OKB-1 | |
| 24 July | | OKB-1 | Suborbital | Missile test | 24 July | Successful |
| 24 July | (Soviet Union) R-2 | | (Soviet Union) Kapustin Yar | | (Soviet Union) OKB-1 | |
| 24 July | | OKB-1 | Suborbital | Missile test | 24 July | Successful |
| 24 July | (Soviet Union) R-5M | | (Soviet Union) Kapustin Yar | | (Soviet Union) OKB-1 | |
| 24 July | | OKB-1 | Suborbital | Missile test | 24 July | Successful |
| 24 July; 05:29:50 | (United States) Aerobee (unknown type) | SM1.03 | (Canada) Churchill | | (United States) US Army | |
| 24 July; 05:29:50 | (United States) Grenades | SCEL / University of Michigan | Suborbital | Aeronomy | 24 July | Successful |
| 24 July; 05:29:50 | Apogee: 88 kilometres (55 mi) | | | | | |
| 27 July | (Soviet Union) R-12 | LKI1-4 | (Soviet Union) Kapustin Yar | | (Soviet Union) MVS | |
| 27 July | | MVS | Suborbital | Missile test | 27 July | Successful |
| 29 July | (Soviet Union) R-2 | | (Soviet Union) Kapustin Yar | | (Soviet Union) OKB-1 | |
| 29 July | | OKB-1 | Suborbital | Missile test | 29 July | Successful |
| 29 July; 21:59 | (United States) Aerobee Hi | NN3.13F | (Canada) Churchill | | (United States) US Navy | |
| 29 July; 21:59 | | NRL | Suborbital | Aeronomy | 29 July | Successful |
| 29 July; 21:59 | Apogee: 210 kilometres (130 mi) | | | | | |
| 30 July; 18:10:02 | (United States) Nike-Cajun | AM6.32 | (Canada) Churchill | | (United States) University of Michigan / US Army | |
| 30 July; 18:10:02 | | University of Michigan | Suborbital | Aeronomy | 30 July | Launch failure |
| 30 July; 18:10:02 | Apogee: 25 kilometres (16 mi) | | | | | |
| 2 August | (Soviet Union) R-12 | LKI1-5 | (Soviet Union) Kapustin Yar | | (Soviet Union) MVS | |
| 2 August | | MVS | Suborbital | Missile test | 2 August | Launch Failure |
| 2 August | (United States) HJ-Nike | | (United States) Wallops Island | | (United States) NACA | |
| 2 August | | NACA | Suborbital | Flat REV test | 2 August | Successful |
| 5 August | (Soviet Union) R-2 | | (Soviet Union) Kapustin Yar | | (Soviet Union) MVS | |
| 5 August | | MVS | Suborbital | Missile test | 5 August | Successful |
| 5 August; 19:10 | (United States) Nike-Deacon | NN7.41F | (United States) San Nicolas | | (United States) US Navy | |
| 5 August; 19:10 | | NRL | Suborbital | Solar UV / X-ray | 5 August | Launch Failure |
| 5 August; 19:10 | Apogee: 14 kilometres (8.7 mi) | | | | | |
| 5 August; 13:22 | (United States) Loki Rockoon | SUI 56 | (United States) USS Plymouth Rock, Labrador Sea | | (United States) US Navy | |
| 5 August; 13:22 | | University of Iowa | Suborbital | Aeronomy / Chemical Release | 5 August | Successful |
| 5 August; 16:59 | (United States) Loki Rockoon | SUI 57 | (United States) USS Plymouth Rock, Labrador Sea | | (United States) US Navy | |
| 5 August; 16:59 | | University of Iowa | Suborbital | Fields | 5 August | Successful |
| 6 August | (Soviet Union) R-2 | | (Soviet Union) Kapustin Yar | | (Soviet Union) MVS | |
| 6 August | | MVS | Suborbital | Missile test | 6 August | Successful |
| 6 August; 13:13 | (United States) Loki Rockoon | SUI 58 | (United States) USS Plymouth Rock, southern Davis Strait | | (United States) US Navy | |
| 6 August; 13:13 | | University of Iowa | Suborbital | Aeronomy / Auroral / Chemical Release | 6 August | Successful |
| 6 August; 13:13 | Apogee: 116 kilometres (72 mi) | | | | | |
| 6 August; 15:30 | (United States) Aerobee AJ10-34 | USAF 82 | (United States) Holloman LC-A | | (United States) US Air Force | |
| 6 August; 15:30 | | AFCRC | Suborbital | Solar UV | 6 August | Successful |
| 6 August; 15:30 | Apogee: 145 kilometres (90 mi) | | | | | |
| 6 August; 17:23 | (United States) Loki Rockoon | SUI 59 | (United States) USS Plymouth Rock, Davis Strait | | (United States) US Navy | |
| 6 August; 17:23 | | University of Iowa | Suborbital | Ionospheric | 6 August | Successful |
| 6 August; 17:23 | Apogee: 117 kilometres (73 mi) | | | | | |
| 7 August; 03:28 | (United States) Loki Rockoon | SUI 60 | (United States) USS Plymouth Rock, northern Davis Strait | | (United States) US Navy | |
| 7 August; 03:28 | | University of Iowa | Suborbital | Aeronomy / Chemical Release | 7 August | Launch failure |
| 7 August | (Soviet Union) R-2 | | (Soviet Union) Kapustin Yar | | (Soviet Union) MVS | |
| 7 August | | MVS | Suborbital | Missile test | 7 August | Successful |
| 7 August; 22:04 | (United States) Loki Rockoon | SUI 61 | (United States) USS Plymouth Rock, Baffin Bay | | (United States) US Navy | |
| 7 August; 22:04 | | University of Iowa | Suborbital | Fields | 7 August | Launch failure |
| 8 August | (Soviet Union) R-2 | | (Soviet Union) Kapustin Yar | | (Soviet Union) MVS | |
| 8 August | | MVS | Suborbital | Missile test | 8 August | Successful |
| 8 August; 06:59 | (United States) Jupiter-C | | (United States) Cape Canaveral LC-6 | | (United States) ABMA | |
| 8 August; 06:59 | | ABMA | Suborbital | REV test | 8 August | Successful |
| 8 August; 06:59 | Apogee: 460 kilometres (290 mi), re-entry nose cone recovered | | | | | |
| 8 August; 07:17 | (United States) Loki Rockoon | SUI 62 | (United States) USS Plymouth Rock, Baffin Bay | | (United States) US Navy | |
| 8 August; 07:17 | | University of Iowa | Suborbital | Aeronomy / Chemical Release | 8 August | Successful |
| 8 August; 07:17 | Apogee: 132 kilometres (82 mi) | | | | | |
| 9 August | (United States) Polaris FTV-3 | | (United States) Cape Canaveral LC-3 | | (United States) US Navy | |
| 9 August | | USNSPO | Suborbital | REV test | 9 August | Successful |
| 9 August | Apogee: 116 kilometres (72 mi), technology test for development of the UGM-27 Polaris | | | | | |
| 10 August; 06:29 | (United States) Loki Rockoon | SUI 63 | (United States) USS Plymouth Rock, Baffin Bay | | (United States) US Navy | |
| 10 August; 06:29 | | University of Iowa | Suborbital | Aeronomy / Auroral / Chemical Release | 10 August | Successful |
| 10 August; 06:29 | Apogee: 117 kilometres (73 mi) | | | | | |
| 10 August; 23:36 | (United States) Loki Rockoon | SUI 64 | (United States) USS Plymouth Rock, Baffin Bay | | (United States) US Navy | |
| 10 August; 23:36 | | University of Iowa | Suborbital | Aeronomy / Auroral / Chemical Release | 10 August | Successful |
| 10 August; 23:36 | Apogee: 77 kilometres (48 mi) | | | | | |
| 11 August; 05:16 | (United States) Loki Rockoon | SUI 65 | (United States) USS Plymouth Rock, Baffin Bay | | (United States) US Navy | |
| 11 August; 05:16 | | University of Iowa | Suborbital | Aeronomy / Chemical Release | 11 August | Launch failure |
| 11 August; 20:30 | (United States) Loki Rockoon | SUI 66 | (United States) USS Plymouth Rock, Davis Strait | | (United States) US Navy | |
| 11 August; 20:30 | | University of Iowa | Suborbital | Aeronomy / Chemical Release | 11 August | Successful |
| 12 August; 07:48 | (United States) Loki Rockoon | SUI 67 | (United States) USS Plymouth Rock, Davis Strait | | (United States) US Navy | |
| 12 August; 07:48 | | University of Iowa | Suborbital | Aeronomy / Auroral / Chemical Release | 12 August | Launch failure |
| 12 August; 15:15 | (United States) Loki Rockoon | SUI 68 | (United States) USS Plymouth Rock, Davis Strait | | (United States) US Navy | |
| 12 August; 15:15 | | University of Iowa | Suborbital | Auroral / Fields | 12 August | Successful |
| 12 August; 15:59:31 | (United States) Aerobee (unknown type) | SM1.04 | (Canada) Churchill | | (United States) US Army | |
| 12 August; 15:59:31 | (United States) Grenades | SCEL / University of Michigan | Suborbital | Aeronomy | 12 August | Successful |
| 12 August; 15:59:31 | Apogee: 74 kilometres (46 mi) | | | | | |
| 13 August; 01:58 | (United States) Loki Rockoon | SUI 69 | (United States) USS Plymouth Rock, southern Davis Strait | | (United States) US Navy | |
| 13 August; 01:58 | | University of Iowa | Suborbital | Aeronomy / Auroral / Chemical Release | 13 August | Successful |
| 13 August | (Soviet Union) R-2A | | (Soviet Union) Kapustin Yar | | (Soviet Union) OKB-1 | |
| 13 August | (Soviet Union) SOI | RAS | Suborbital | Solar UV | 13 August | Successful |
| 14 August; 09:24 | (United States) Loki Rockoon | SUI 70 | (United States) USS Plymouth Rock, Labrador Sea | | (United States) US Navy | |
| 14 August; 09:24 | | University of Iowa | Suborbital | Aeronomy / Auroral / Chemical Release | 14 August | Successful |
| 14 August; 15:07 | (United States) Loki Rockoon | SUI 71 | (United States) USS Plymouth Rock, Labrador Sea | | (United States) US Navy | |
| 14 August; 15:07 | | University of Iowa | Suborbital | Auroral / Fields | 14 August | Successful |
| 14 August; 15:07 | Apogee: 97 kilometres (60 mi) | | | | | |
| 14 August; 21:19 | (United States) Loki Rockoon | SUI 72 | (United States) USS Plymouth Rock, Labrador Sea | | (United States) US Navy | |
| 14 August; 21:19 | | University of Iowa | Suborbital | Aeronomy / Auroral / Chemical Release | 14 August | Successful |
| 14 August; 21:19 | Apogee: 130 kilometres (81 mi) | | | | | |
| 15 August; 00:11 | (United States) Loki Rockoon | SUI 73 | (United States) USS Plymouth Rock, Labrador Sea | | (United States) US Navy | |
| 15 August; 00:11 | | University of Iowa | Suborbital | Aeronomy / Auroral / Chemical Release | 15 August | Successful |
| 15 August; 00:11 | Apogee: 97 kilometres (60 mi) | | | | | |
| 15 August | (Soviet Union) R-12 | LKI1-6 | (Soviet Union) Kapustin Yar | | (Soviet Union) MVS | |
| 15 August | | MVS | Suborbital | Missile test | 15 August | Successful |
| 16 August | (United States) Polaris FTV-5 | | (United States) Cape Canaveral LC-3 | | (United States) US Navy | |
| 16 August | | USNSPO | Suborbital | REV test | 16 August | Successful |
| 16 August | Apogee: 169 kilometres (105 mi), technology test for development of the UGM-27 Polaris; final flight of the Polaris FTV-5 | | | | | |
| 19 August | (United States) Aerobee (unknown type) | USAF 83 | (United States) Holloman LC-A | | (United States) US Air Force | |
| 19 August | | AFCRC | Suborbital | Aeronomy | 19 August | Successful |
| 19 August | Apogee: 178 kilometres (111 mi) | | | | | |
| 20 August; 02:29:51 | (United States) Aerobee (unknown type) | SM1.05 | (Canada) Churchill | | (United States) US Army | |
| 20 August; 02:29:51 | (United States) Grenades | SCEL / University of Michigan | Suborbital | Aeronomy | 20 August | Successful |
| 20 August; 02:29:51 | Apogee: 88 kilometres (55 mi) | | | | | |
| 20 August | (Soviet Union) R-2 | | (Soviet Union) Kapustin Yar | | (Soviet Union) MVS | |
| 20 August | | MVS | Suborbital | Missile test | 20 August | Successful |
| 20 August; 16:50:04 | (United States) Nike-Deacon | NN7.42F | (United States) San Nicolas | | (United States) US Navy | |
| 20 August; 16:50:04 | | NRL | Suborbital | Solar UV / X-ray | 20 August | Successful |
| 20 August; 16:50:04 | Apogee: 96 kilometres (60 mi) | | | | | |
| 21 August; 12:25 | (Soviet Union) R-7 | | (Soviet Union) Baikonur Site 1/5 | | (Soviet Union) MVS | |
| 21 August; 12:25 | | MVS | Suborbital | Missile test | 21 August | Successful |
| 21 August; 12:25 | First successful R-7 launch | | | | | |
| 21 August | (United States) Aerobee (unknown type) | USAF 84 | (United States) Holloman LC-A | | (United States) US Air Force | |
| 21 August | | AFCRC | Suborbital | Aeronomy | 21 August | Successful |
| 22 August | (Soviet Union) R-2 | | (Soviet Union) Kapustin Yar | | (Soviet Union) MVS | |
| 22 August | | MVS | Suborbital | Missile test | 22 August | Successful |
| 23 August | (Soviet Union) R-2 | | (Soviet Union) Kapustin Yar | | (Soviet Union) MVS | |
| 23 August | | MVS | Suborbital | Missile test | 23 August | Successful |
| 23 August; 21:54:05 | (United States) Nike-Cajun | RP6.X1 | (Canada) Churchill | | (United States) University of Michigan / US Army | |
| 23 August; 21:54:05 | | BRL | Suborbital | Test flight | 23 August | Successful |
| 23 August; 21:54:05 | Apogee: 114 kilometres (71 mi) | | | | | |
| 24 August; 06:00 | (United States) Nike-Cajun | SS6.38 | (Canada) Churchill | | (United States) University of Michigan / US Army | |
| 24 August; 06:00 | | USASC | Suborbital | Aeronomy | 24 August | Launch failure |
| 25 August; 02:23 | (Soviet Union) R-2A | | (Soviet Union) Kapustin Yar | | (Soviet Union) OKB-1 | |
| 25 August; 02:23 | | NIIAM | Suborbital | Ionospheric / Biological | 25 August | Successful |
| 25 August; 02:23 | Apogee: 206 kilometres (128 mi) | | | | | |
| 25 August; 02:29 | (United States) Aerobee (unknown type) | SM2.05 | (Canada) Churchill | | (United States) US Army | |
| 25 August; 02:29 | | SCEL / University of Michigan | Suborbital | Aeronomy | 25 August | Successful |
| 25 August; 02:29 | Apogee: 51 kilometres (32 mi) | | | | | |
| 25 August; 03:27 | (Soviet Union) R-2A | | (Soviet Union) Kapustin Yar | | (Soviet Union) OKB-1 | |
| 25 August; 03:27 | | RAS | Suborbital | Test flight | 25 August | Successful |
| 25 August; 03:27 | Apogee: 208 kilometres (129 mi) | | | | | |
| 25 August; 14:08:05 | (United States) Aerobee (unknown type) | SM2.06 | (Canada) Churchill | | (United States) US Army | |
| 25 August; 14:08:05 | (United States) Grenades | SCEL / University of Michigan | Suborbital | Aeronomy | 25 August | Successful |
| 25 August; 14:08:05 | Apogee: 130 kilometres (81 mi) | | | | | |
| 27 August | (Soviet Union) R-2 | | (Soviet Union) Kapustin Yar | | (Soviet Union) MVS | |
| 27 August | | MVS | Suborbital | Missile test | 27 August | Successful |
| 27 August | (Soviet Union) R-2 | | (Soviet Union) Kapustin Yar | | (Soviet Union) MVS | |
| 27 August | | MVS | Suborbital | Missile test | 27 August | Successful |
| 27 August | (Soviet Union) R-2 | | (Soviet Union) Kapustin Yar | | (Soviet Union) MVS | |
| 27 August | | MVS | Suborbital | Missile test | 27 August | Successful |
| 27 August; 15:54 | (United States) Nike-Deacon | NN7.43F | (United States) San Nicolas | | (United States) US Navy | |
| 27 August; 15:54 | | NRL | Suborbital | Solar UV / X-ray | 27 August | Launch failure |
| 27 August; 15:54 | Apogee: 16 kilometres (9.9 mi) | | | | | |
| 28 August; 04:15:03 | (United States) Nike-Cajun | II6.22F | (Canada) Churchill | | (United States) University of Michigan | |
| 28 August; 04:15:03 | | University of Iowa | Suborbital | Auroral particles | 28 August | Successful |
| 28 August; 20:21:40 | (United States) Nike-Deacon | NN7.44F | (United States) San Nicolas | | (United States) US Navy | |
| 28 August; 20:21:40 | | NRL | Suborbital | Solar UV / X-ray | 28 August | Successful |
| 28 August; 20:21:40 | Apogee: 96 kilometres (60 mi) | | | | | |
| 28 August; 21:02 | (United States) SM-78 Jupiter | | (United States) Cape Canaveral LC-26A | | (United States) US Air Force | |
| 28 August; 21:02 | | ABMA | Suborbital | Missile test | 28 August | Successful |
| 29 August | (Soviet Union) R-12 | LKI1-7 | (Soviet Union) Kapustin Yar | | (Soviet Union) MVS | |
| 29 August | | MVS | Suborbital | Missile test | 29 August | Successful |
| 29 August; 21:12:25 | (United States) Nike-Deacon | NN7.45F | (United States) San Nicolas | | (United States) US Navy | |
| 29 August; 21:12:25 | | NRL | Suborbital | Solar UV / X-ray | 29 August | Successful |
| 29 August; 21:12:25 | Apogee: 113 kilometres (70 mi) | | | | | |
| 30 August; 20:10 | (United States) XSM-75 Thor | 104 | (United States) Cape Canaveral LC-17A | | (United States) US Air Force | |
| 30 August; 20:10 | | ARDC | Suborbital | Missile test | 30 August | Launch failure |
| 30 August; 20:10 | Disintegrated 96 seconds after launch | | | | | |
| 31 August; 04:57 | (United States) Nike-Cajun | II6.23F | (Canada) Churchill | | (United States) University of Michigan / US Air Force | |
| 31 August; 04:57 | | University of Iowa | Suborbital | Auroral particles | 31 August | Successful |
| 31 August; 04:57 | Apogee: 115 kilometres (71 mi) | | | | | |
| 31 August; 05:30 | (Soviet Union) R-2A | | (Soviet Union) Kapustin Yar | | (Soviet Union) OKB-1 | |
| 31 August; 05:30 | | NIIAM | Suborbital | Ionospheric / Biological | 31 August | Successful |
| 31 August; 05:30 | Apogee: 185 kilometres (115 mi) | | | | | |
| 1 September; 22:28 | (United States) Aerobee Hi | AM4.001 | (Canada) Churchill | | (United States) US Air Force | |
| 1 September; 22:28 | | AFCRC / University of Michigan | Suborbital | Aeronomy | 1 September | Successful |
| 1 September; 22:28 | Apogee: 160 kilometres (99 mi) | | | | | |
| 5 September | (Soviet Union) R-5M | M1-1 | (Soviet Union) Kapustin Yar | | (Soviet Union) OKB-1 | |
| 5 September | (Soviet Union) Generator-5 | OKB-1 | Suborbital | Missile test | 5 September | Successful |
| 7 September; 11:39 | (Soviet Union) R-7 | | (Soviet Union) Baikonur Site 1/5 | | (Soviet Union) MVS | |
| 7 September; 11:39 | | MVS | Suborbital | Missile test | 7 September | Successful |
| 9 September; 15:50 | (Soviet Union) R-2A | | (Soviet Union) Kapustin Yar | | (Soviet Union) OKB-1 | |
| 9 September; 15:50 | | RAS | Suborbital | Ionospheric / Biological | 9 September | Successful |
| 9 September; 15:50 | Apogee: 212 kilometres (132 mi) | | | | | |
| 12 September | (Soviet Union) R-5M | | (Soviet Union) Kapustin Yar | | (Soviet Union) OKB-1 | |
| 12 September | | OKB-1 | Suborbital | Missile test | 12 September | Successful |
| 12 September; 15:19:30 | (United States) Nike-Deacon | NN7.46F | (United States) San Nicolas | | (United States) US Navy | |
| 12 September; 15:19:30 | | NRL | Suborbital | Solar UV / X-ray | 12 September | Launch failure |
| 12 September; 15:19:30 | Apogee: 3 kilometres (1.9 mi) | | | | | |
| 14 September | (Soviet Union) R-5M | | (Soviet Union) Kapustin Yar | | (Soviet Union) OKB-1 | |
| 14 September | | OKB-1 | Suborbital | Missile test | 14 September | Successful |
| 15 September; 20:43 | (United States) Nike-Deacon | NN7.47F | (United States) San Nicolas | | (United States) US Navy | |
| 15 September; 20:43 | | NRL | Suborbital | Solar UV / X-ray | 15 September | Launch failure |
| 17 September; 14:04 | (United States) Aerobee RTV-N-10 | NRL 21 | (United States) White Sands LC-35 | | (United States) US Navy | |
| 17 September; 14:04 | | NRL | Suborbital | Solar UV | 17 September | Successful |
| 17 September; 14:04 | Apogee: 51 kilometres (32 mi), final flight of the RTV-N-10 | | | | | |
| 18 September; 17:42 | (United States) Nike-Deacon | NN7.48F | (United States) San Nicolas | | (United States) US Navy | |
| 18 September; 17:42 | | NRL | Suborbital | Solar UV / X-ray | 18 September | Launch failure |
| 18 September; 17:42 | Apogee: 21 kilometres (13 mi) | | | | | |
| 18 September; 17:54 | (United States) Nike-Deacon | NN7.49F | (United States) San Nicolas | | (United States) US Navy | |
| 18 September; 17:54 | | NRL | Suborbital | Solar UV / X-ray | 18 September | Successful |
| 18 September; 17:54 | Apogee: 77 kilometres (48 mi), final flight of the Nike-Deacon | | | | | |
| 19 September; 16:30 | (United States) Aerobee (unknown type) | | (United States) Holloman LC-A | | (United States) US Air Force | |
| 19 September; 16:30 | | AFCRC | Suborbital | Aeronomy | 19 September | Successful |
| 19 September; 16:30 | Released caesium | | | | | |
| 20 September; 14:25 | (United States) XSM-75 Thor | 105 | (United States) Cape Canaveral LC-17B | | (United States) US Air Force | |
| 20 September; 14:25 | | ARDC | Suborbital | Missile test | 20 September | Successful |
| 20 September; 14:25 | First successful Thor launch | | | | | |
| 21 September | (Soviet Union) R-2 | | (Soviet Union) Urda, Kazakhstan | | (Soviet Union) MVS | |
| 21 September | | MVS | Suborbital | Missile test | 21 September | Successful |
| 21 September | Launched with tactical launcher | | | | | |
| 21 September | (Soviet Union) R-2 | | (Soviet Union) Urda, Kazakhstan | | (Soviet Union) MVS | |
| 21 September | | MVS | Suborbital | Missile test | 21 September | Successful |
| 21 September | Launched with tactical launcher | | | | | |
| 22 September | (Soviet Union) R-2 | | (Soviet Union) Urda, Kazakhstan | | (Soviet Union) MVS | |
| 22 September | | MVS | Suborbital | Missile test | 22 September | Successful |
| 22 September | Launched with tactical launcher | | | | | |
| 23 September | (Soviet Union) R-2 | | (Soviet Union) Urda, Kazakhstan | | (Soviet Union) MVS | |
| 23 September | | MVS | Suborbital | Missile test | 23 September | Successful |
| 23 September | Launched with tactical launcher | | | | | |
| 25 September | (United States) Farside | Shot 1 | (Trust Territory of the Pacific Islands) Eniwetok | | (United States) US Air Force | |
| 25 September | | AFOSR | Suborbital | Ionospheric | 25 September | Launch failure |
| 25 September | Maiden flight of the Farside, stage zero (balloon) malfunction | | | | | |
| 25 September; 19:57 | (United States) XSM-65A Atlas | 6A | (United States) Cape Canaveral LC-14 | | (United States) US Air Force | |
| 25 September; 19:57 | | ARDC | Suborbital | Test flight | 25 September | Partial failure |
| 25 September; 19:57 | Apogee: 4 kilometres (2.5 mi), destroyed by range safety following fuel system malfunction, flight considered partial success | | | | | |
| 26 September | (Soviet Union) R-5M | | (Soviet Union) Kapustin Yar | | (Soviet Union) OKB-1 | |
| 26 September | | OKB-1 | Suborbital | Missile test | 26 September | Successful |
| 26 September; 18:21 | (United States) Loki Rockoon | SUI 74 | (United States) USS Glacier, Atlantic Ocean | | (United States) US Navy | |
| 26 September; 18:21 | | University of Iowa | Suborbital | Test flight | 26 September | Successful |
| 26 September; 20:00 | (United States) Nike-Asp | NN8.50F | (United States) San Nicolas | | (United States) US Navy | |
| 26 September; 20:00 | | NRL | Suborbital | Test flight | 26 September | Launch failure |
| 26 September; 20:00 | Apogee: 16 kilometres (9.9 mi), maiden flight of the Nike-Asp | | | | | |
| 27 September; 14:27 | (United States) Loki Rockoon | SUI 75 | (United States) USS Glacier, east of The Bahamas | | (United States) US Navy | |
| 27 September; 14:27 | | University of Iowa | Suborbital | Chemical release | 27 September | Successful |
| 27 September; 14:27 | Apogee: 119 kilometres (74 mi) | | | | | |
| 29 September | (Soviet Union) R-2 | | (Soviet Union) Urda, Kazakhstan | | (Soviet Union) MVS | |
| 29 September | | MVS | Suborbital | Missile test | 29 September | Successful |
| 29 September | Launched with tactical launcher | | | | | |
| 30 September | (Soviet Union) R-2 | | (Soviet Union) Urda, Kazakhstan | | (Soviet Union) MVS | |
| 30 September | | MVS | Suborbital | Missile test | 30 September | Successful |
| 30 September | Launched with tactical launcher | | | | | |
| October | (Australia) Long Tom | LT1 | (Australia) Woomera LA-2 SL | | (Australia) WRE | |
| October | | WRE | Suborbital | Test flight | Same Day | Successful |
| October | Maiden flight of the Long Tom and first Australian spaceflight | | | | | |
| 1 October | (Soviet Union) R-2 | | (Soviet Union) Kapustin Yar | | (Soviet Union) MVS | |
| 1 October | | MVS | Suborbital | Missile test | 1 October | Successful |
| 2 October | (Soviet Union) R-2 | | (Soviet Union) Kapustin Yar | | (Soviet Union) MVS | |
| 2 October | | MVS | Suborbital | Missile test | 2 October | Successful |
| 3 October | (United States) Farside | Shot 2 | (Trust Territory of the Pacific Islands) Eniwetok | | (United States) US Air Force | |
| 3 October | | AFOSR | Suborbital | Ionospheric | 3 October | Launch failure |
| 3 October | (United States) XSM-75 Thor | 107 | (United States) Cape Canaveral LC-17A | | (United States) US Air Force | |
| 3 October | | ARDC | Suborbital | Missile test | 3 October | Launch failure |
| 4 October; 20:36 | (United States) Loki Rockoon | SUI 76 | (United States) USS Glacier, Pacific Ocean, Southwest of Costa Rica | | (United States) US Navy | |
| 4 October; 20:36 | | University of Iowa | Suborbital | Chemical release | 4 October | Successful |
| 4 October; 20:36 | Apogee: 113 kilometres (70 mi) | | | | | |
| 6 October | (Soviet Union) R-1 | | (Soviet Union) Kapustin Yar | | (Soviet Union) MVS | |
| 6 October | | MVS | Suborbital | Missile test | 6 October | Successful |
| 6 October | (Soviet Union) R-1 | | (Soviet Union) Kapustin Yar | | (Soviet Union) MVS | |
| 6 October | | MVS | Suborbital | Missile test | 6 October | Successful |
| 7 October | (United States) Farside | Shot 3 | (Trust Territory of the Pacific Islands) Eniwetok | | (United States) US Air Force | |
| 7 October | | AFOSR | Suborbital | Ionospheric | 7 October | Launch failure |
| 11 October | (United States) Farside | Shot 4 | (Trust Territory of the Pacific Islands) Eniwetok | | (United States) US Air Force | |
| 11 October | | AFOSR | Suborbital | Ionospheric | 11 October | Launch failure |
| 11 October; 16:33 | (United States) XSM-75 Thor | 108 | (United States) Cape Canaveral LC-17B | | (United States) US Air Force | |
| 11 October; 16:33 | | ARDC | Suborbital | Missile test | 11 October | Partial launch failure |
| 11 October; 16:33 | Turbopump gearbox malfunctioned, still met primary test objectives | | | | | |
| 12 October | (Soviet Union) R-2 | | (Soviet Union) Kapustin Yar | | (Soviet Union) MVS | |
| 12 October | | MVS | Suborbital | Missile test | 12 October | Successful |
| 12 October | (Soviet Union) R-2 | | (Soviet Union) Kapustin Yar | | (Soviet Union) MVS | |
| 12 October | | MVS | Suborbital | Missile test | 12 October | Successful |
| 13 October | (Soviet Union) R-1 | | (Soviet Union) Kapustin Yar | | (Soviet Union) MVS | |
| 13 October | | MVS | Suborbital | Missile test | 13 October | Successful |
| 13 October | (Soviet Union) R-2 | | (Soviet Union) Kapustin Yar | | (Soviet Union) MVS | |
| 13 October | | MVS | Suborbital | Missile test | 13 October | Successful |
| 13 October | (Soviet Union) R-2 | | (Soviet Union) Kapustin Yar | | (Soviet Union) MVS | |
| 13 October | | MVS | Suborbital | Missile test | 13 October | Successful |
| 13 October; 18:15 | (United States) Loki Rockoon | SUI 77 | (United States) USS Glacier, Central Pacific Ocean, east of Kiribati | | (United States) US Navy | |
| 13 October; 18:15 | | University of Iowa | Suborbital | Chemical release | 13 October | Successful |
| 14 October | (Soviet Union) R-1 | | (Soviet Union) Kapustin Yar | | (Soviet Union) MVS | |
| 14 October | | MVS | Suborbital | Missile test | 14 October | Successful |
| 14 October | (Soviet Union) R-1 | | (Soviet Union) Kapustin Yar | | (Soviet Union) MVS | |
| 14 October | | MVS | Suborbital | Missile test | 14 October | Successful |
| 14 October; 15:08 | (United States) Aerobee (unknown type) | USAF 87 | (United States) Holloman LC-A | | (United States) US Air Force | |
| 14 October; 15:08 | | AFCRC | Suborbital | Meteorite research | 14 October | Successful |
| 14 October; 15:08 | Apogee: 146 kilometres (91 mi) | | | | | |
| 14 October; 22:31 | (United States) Loki Rockoon | SUI 78 | (United States) USS Glacier, Central Pacific Ocean, east of Kiribati | | (United States) US Navy | |
| 14 October; 22:31 | | University of Iowa | Suborbital | Aeronomy / Fields | 14 October | Successful |
| 14 October; 22:31 | Apogee: 113 kilometres (70 mi) | | | | | |
| 16 October; 21:17 | (United States) Loki Rockoon | SUI 79 | (United States) USS Glacier, Central Pacific Ocean, near Kiribati | | (United States) US Navy | |
| 16 October; 21:17 | | University of Iowa | Suborbital | Aeronomy / Fields | 16 October | Successful |
| 17 October; 00:09 | (United States) Loki Rockoon | SUI 80 | (United States) USS Glacier, Central Pacific Ocean, near Kiribati | | (United States) US Navy | |
| 17 October; 00:09 | | University of Iowa | Suborbital | Aeronomy / Fields | 17 October | Launch failure |
| 17 October; 02:18 | (United States) Loki Rockoon | SUI 81 | (United States) USS Glacier, Central Pacific Ocean, near Kiribati | | (United States) US Navy | |
| 17 October; 02:18 | | University of Iowa | Suborbital | Aeronomy / Fields | 17 October | Launch failure |
| 17 October; 05:05 | (United States) Aerobee (unknown type) | USAF 88 | (United States) Holloman LC-A | | (United States) US Air Force | |
| 17 October; 05:05 | (United States) Artificial Meteor | AFCRC / Caltech | Suborbital | Meteorite research | 17 October | Successful |
| 17 October; 05:05 | Apogee: 114 kilometres (71 mi) | | | | | |
| 17 October; 21:16 | (United States) Loki Rockoon | SUI 82 | (United States) USS Glacier, Central Pacific Ocean, near Kiribati | | (United States) US Navy | |
| 17 October; 21:16 | | University of Iowa | Suborbital | Aeronomy / Fields | 17 October | Launch failure |
| 17 October; 21:16 | Apogee: 44 kilometres (27 mi) | | | | | |
| 18 October; 00:59 | (United States) Loki Rockoon | SUI 83 | (United States) USS Glacier, Central Pacific Ocean, near Kiribati | | (United States) US Navy | |
| 18 October; 00:59 | | University of Iowa | Suborbital | Fields | 18 October | Successful |
| 18 October; 00:59 | Apogee: 127 kilometres (79 mi) | | | | | |
| 18 October; 09:35 | (United States) Loki Rockoon | SUI 84 | (United States) USS Glacier, Central Pacific Ocean, near Kiribati | | (United States) US Navy | |
| 18 October; 09:35 | | University of Iowa | Suborbital | Chemical release | 18 October | Successful |
| 18 October; 20:58 | (United States) Loki Rockoon | SUI 85 | (United States) USS Glacier, Central Pacific Ocean, near Kiribati | | (United States) US Navy | |
| 18 October; 20:58 | | University of Iowa | Suborbital | Aeronomy / Fields | 18 October | Successful |
| 18 October; 20:58 | Apogee: 121 kilometres (75 mi) | | | | | |
| 19 October; 00:59 | (United States) Loki Rockoon | SUI 86 | (United States) USS Glacier, Central Pacific Ocean, near Kiribati | | (United States) US Navy | |
| 19 October; 00:59 | | University of Iowa | Suborbital | Fields | 19 October | Successful |
| 19 October; 00:59 | Apogee: 121 kilometres (75 mi) | | | | | |
| 19 October; 20:07 | (United States) Loki Rockoon | SUI 87 | (United States) USS Glacier, Central Pacific Ocean, near Kiribati | | (United States) US Navy | |
| 19 October; 20:07 | | University of Iowa | Suborbital | Fields | 19 October | Successful |
| 19 October; 20:07 | Apogee: 122 kilometres (76 mi) | | | | | |
| 20 October | (United States) Farside | Shot 5 | (Trust Territory of the Pacific Islands) Eniwetok | | (United States) US Air Force | |
| 20 October | | AFOSR | Suborbital | Ionospheric | 20 October | Spacecraft failure |
| 20 October | Apogee: 3,200 to 5,000 kilometres (2,000 to 3,100 mi), returned no data due to transmitter malfunction | | | | | |
| 20 October; 02:19 | (United States) Loki Rockoon | SUI 88 | (United States) USS Glacier, Central Pacific Ocean, near Kiribati | | (United States) US Navy | |
| 20 October; 02:19 | | University of Iowa | Suborbital | Aeronomy / Fields | 20 October | Successful |
| 20 October; 02:19 | Apogee: 104 kilometres (65 mi) | | | | | |
| 20 October; 03:57 | (United States) Loki Rockoon | SUI 89 | (United States) USS Glacier, Central Pacific Ocean, near Kiribati | | (United States) US Navy | |
| 20 October; 03:57 | | University of Iowa | Suborbital | Chemical release | 20 October | Successful |
| 20 October; 20:11 | (United States) Loki Rockoon | SUI 90 | (United States) USS Glacier, Central Pacific Ocean, southwest of Kiribati | | (United States) US Navy | |
| 20 October; 20:11 | | University of Iowa | Suborbital | Chemical release | 20 October | Successful |
| 22 October | (United States) Farside | Shot 6 | (Trust Territory of the Pacific Islands) Eniwetok | | (United States) US Air Force | |
| 22 October | | AFOSR | Suborbital | Ionospheric | 22 October | Spacecraft failure |
| 22 October | Apogee: 3,200 to 5,000 kilometres (2,000 to 3,100 mi), returned no data due to transmitter malfunction | | | | | |
| 22 October; 22:31 | (United States) Loki Rockoon | SUI 91 | (United States) USS Glacier, South Pacific Ocean, near the Cook Islands | | (United States) US Navy | |
| 22 October; 22:31 | | University of Iowa | Suborbital | Chemical release | 22 October | Successful |
| 23 October; 01:07 | (United States) SM-78 Jupiter | | (United States) Cape Canaveral LC-26B | | (United States) US Air Force | |
| 23 October; 01:07 | | ABMA | Suborbital | Missile test | 23 October | Successful |
| 23 October | (United States) Aerobee (unknown type) | | (United States) Holloman LC-A | | (United States) US Air Force | |
| 23 October | | AFCRC | Suborbital | Aeronomy | 23 October | Successful |
| 23 October; 19:22:54 | (United States) Vanguard | TV-2 | (United States) Cape Canaveral LC-18A | | (United States) US Navy | |
| 23 October; 19:22:54 | (United States) Vanguard TV-2 | NRL | Suborbital | Test flight | 23 October | Successful |
| 23 October; 19:22:54 | Maiden flight of the Vanguard, battleship upper stages, apogee: 175 kilometres (109 mi) | | | | | |
| 24 October | (Soviet Union) R-1 | | (Soviet Union) Kapustin Yar | | (Soviet Union) MVS | |
| 24 October | | MVS | Suborbital | Missile test | 24 October | Successful |
| 24 October | (Soviet Union) R-1 | | (Soviet Union) Kapustin Yar | | (Soviet Union) MVS | |
| 24 October | | MVS | Suborbital | Missile test | 24 October | Successful |
| 24 October | (Soviet Union) R-1 | | (Soviet Union) Kapustin Yar | | (Soviet Union) MVS | |
| 24 October | | MVS | Suborbital | Missile test | 24 October | Successful |
| 24 October; 14:30 | (United States) Polaris FTV-3 | | (United States) Cape Canaveral LC-3 | | (United States) US Navy | |
| 24 October; 14:30 | | USNSPO | Suborbital | REV test | 24 October | Successful |
| 24 October; 14:30 | Technology test for development of the UGM-27 Polaris | | | | | |
| 24 October; 16:38 | (United States) XSM-75 Thor | 109 | (United States) Cape Canaveral LC-17A | | (United States) US Air Force | |
| 24 October; 16:38 | | ARDC | Suborbital | Missile test | 24 October | Successful |
| 24 October; 16:38 | Final flight of R&D Series I; long range test | | | | | |
| 25 October | (United States) Aerobee (unknown type) | | (United States) Holloman LC-A | | (United States) US Air Force | |
| 25 October | | AFCRC | Suborbital | Ionospheric | 25 October | Successful |
| 25 October | (United States) HJ-Nike-Nike | | (United States) Wallops Island | | (United States) US Air Force | |
| 25 October | | ARDC | Suborbital | REV test | 25 October | Successful |
| 25 October | Maiden flight of the HJ-Nike-Nike, although it wouldn't go to space until 1962 | | | | | |
| 26 October | (Soviet Union) R-2 | | (Soviet Union) Kapustin Yar | | (Soviet Union) MVS | |
| 26 October | | MVS | Suborbital | Missile test | 26 October | Successful |
| 26 October; 19:47 | (United States) Loki Rockoon | SUI 92 | (United States) USS Glacier, South Pacific Ocean, east of New Zealand | | (United States) US Navy | |
| 26 October; 19:47 | | University of Iowa | Suborbital | Chemical release | 26 October | Successful |
| 27 October; 02:46 | (United States) Loki Rockoon | SUI 93 | (United States) USS Glacier, South Pacific Ocean, east of New Zealand | | (United States) US Navy | |
| 27 October; 02:46 | | University of Iowa | Suborbital | Chemical release | 27 October | Launch failure |
| 27 October | (Soviet Union) R-2 | | (Soviet Union) Kapustin Yar | | (Soviet Union) MVS | |
| 27 October | | MVS | Suborbital | Missile test | 27 October | Successful |
| 29 October; 00:13 | (United States) Loki Rockoon | SUI 94 | (United States) USS Glacier, South Pacific Ocean, southeast of New Zealand | | (United States) US Navy | |
| 29 October; 00:13 | | University of Iowa | Suborbital | Aeronomy / Chemical release | 29 October | Launch failure |
| 29 October; 00:13 | Apogee: 8 kilometres (5.0 mi) | | | | | |
| 30 October; 22:50 | (United States) Loki Rockoon | SUI 95 | (United States) USS Glacier, Southern Ocean, southeast of New Zealand | | (United States) US Navy | |
| 30 October; 22:50 | | University of Iowa | Suborbital | Aeronomy / Chemical release | 30 October | Successful |
| 31 October; 01:44 | (United States) Loki Rockoon | SUI 96 | (United States) USS Glacier, Southern Ocean, southeast of New Zealand | | (United States) US Navy | |
| 31 October; 01:44 | | University of Iowa | Suborbital | Aeronomy / Chemical release | 31 October | Successful |
| 31 October; 19:51 | (United States) Loki Rockoon | SUI 97 | (United States) USS Glacier, Southern Ocean, southeast of New Zealand | | (United States) US Navy | |
| 31 October; 19:51 | | University of Iowa | Suborbital | Aeronomy / Fields | 31 October | Successful |
| 1 November; 01:00 | (United States) Loki Rockoon | SUI 98 | (United States) USS Glacier, Southern Ocean, southeast of New Zealand | | (United States) US Navy | |
| 1 November; 01:00 | | University of Iowa | Suborbital | Aeronomy / Fields | 1 November | Launch failure |
| 3 November | (Soviet Union) R-5M | M1-2 | (Soviet Union) Kapustin Yar | | (Soviet Union) OKB-1 | |
| 3 November | (Soviet Union) Generator-5 | OKB-1 | Suborbital | Missile test | 3 November | Successful |
| 3 November; 20:08 | (United States) Loki Rockoon | SUI 99 | (United States) USS Glacier, Southern Ocean, north of McMurdo Station | | (United States) US Navy | |
| 3 November; 20:08 | | University of Iowa | Suborbital | Aeronomy / Fields | 3 November | Launch failure |
| 4 November; 00:39 | (United States) Loki Rockoon | SUI 100 | (United States) USS Glacier, Southern Ocean, north of McMurdo Station | | (United States) US Navy | |
| 4 November; 00:39 | | University of Iowa | Suborbital | Aeronomy / Chemical release | 4 November | Successful |
| 4 November; 02:50 | (United States) Loki Rockoon | SUI 101 | (United States) USS Glacier, Southern Ocean, north of McMurdo Station | | (United States) US Navy | |
| 4 November; 02:50 | | University of Iowa | Suborbital | Aeronomy / Fields | 4 November | Successful |
| 4 November; 02:50 | Apogee: 113 kilometres (70 mi) | | | | | |
| 4 November; 03:47 | (United States) Loki Rockoon | SUI 102 | (United States) USS Glacier, Southern Ocean, north of McMurdo Station | | (United States) US Navy | |
| 4 November; 03:47 | | University of Iowa | Suborbital | Aeronomy / Fields | 4 November | Launch failure |
| 4 November; 07:16 | (United States) Loki Rockoon | SUI 103 | (United States) USS Glacier, Southern Ocean, north of McMurdo Station | | (United States) US Navy | |
| 4 November; 07:16 | | University of Iowa | Suborbital | Aeronomy / Chemical release | 4 November | Launch failure |
| 4 November | (Soviet Union) R-2 | | (Soviet Union) Kapustin Yar | | (Soviet Union) MVS | |
| 4 November | | MVS | Suborbital | Missile test | 4 November | Successful |
| 4 November; 18:52 | (United States) Loki Rockoon | SUI 104 | (United States) USS Glacier, Southern Ocean, north of McMurdo Station | | (United States) US Navy | |
| 4 November; 18:52 | | University of Iowa | Suborbital | Aeronomy / Fields | 4 November | Successful |
| 5 November; 01:25 | (United States) Loki Rockoon | SUI 105 | (United States) USS Glacier, Southern Ocean, north of McMurdo Station | | (United States) US Navy | |
| 5 November; 01:25 | | University of Iowa | Suborbital | Aeronomy / Chemical release | 5 November | Successful |
| 5 November; 20:23 | (United States) Loki Rockoon | SUI 106 | (United States) USS Glacier, Southern Ocean, north of McMurdo Station | | (United States) US Navy | |
| 5 November; 20:23 | | University of Iowa | Suborbital | Aeronomy / Fields | 5 November | Successful |
| 5 November; 20:23 | Apogee: 97 kilometres (60 mi) | | | | | |
| 5 November; 23:17 | (United States) Loki Rockoon | SUI 107 | (United States) USS Glacier, Southern Ocean, north of McMurdo Station | | (United States) US Navy | |
| 5 November; 23:17 | | University of Iowa | Suborbital | Aeronomy / Fields | 5 November | Successful |
| 5 November; 23:17 | Apogee: 100 kilometres (62 mi) | | | | | |
| 7 November; 16:05 | (United States) Aerobee (unknown type) | USAF 89 | (United States) Holloman LC-A | | (United States) US Air Force | |
| 7 November; 16:05 | | AFCRC | Suborbital | Ionospheric | 7 November | Successful |
| 8 November | (United States) Polaris FTV-3 | | (United States) Cape Canaveral LC-3 | | (United States) US Navy | |
| 8 November | | USNSPO | Suborbital | REV test | 8 November | Successful |
| 8 November | Technology test for development of the UGM-27 Polaris, final flight of the Polaris FTV-3 | | | | | |
| 8 November; 14:57 | (United States) Aerobee (unknown type) | USAF 90 | (United States) Holloman LC-A | | (United States) US Air Force | |
| 8 November; 14:57 | | AFCRC | Suborbital | Ionospheric | 8 November | Launch failure |
| 8 November; 22:00 | (United States) Loki Rockoon | SUI 108 | (United States) USS Glacier, South Pacific Ocean, near New Zealand | | (United States) US Navy | |
| 8 November; 22:00 | | University of Iowa | Suborbital | Aeronomy / Chemical release | 8 November | Successful |
| 8 November; 22:00 | Apogee: 110 kilometres (68 mi) | | | | | |
| 9 November; 00:00 | (United States) Loki Rockoon | SUI 109 | (United States) USS Glacier, South Pacific Ocean, near New Zealand | | (United States) US Navy | |
| 9 November; 00:00 | | University of Iowa | Suborbital | Aeronomy / Chemical release | 9 November | Successful |
| 9 November; 00:00 | Apogee: 110 kilometres (68 mi), final flight of the Loki Rockoon | | | | | |
| 9 November; 16:54 | (Soviet Union) A-1 | | (Soviet Union) Kapustin Yar | | (Soviet Union) MVS | |
| 9 November; 16:54 | | RAS | Suborbital | Ionospheric / Aeronomy | 9 November | Successful |
| 9 November; 16:54 | Apogee: 330 kilometres (210 mi) | | | | | |
| 10 November | (United States) Aerobee (unknown type) | | (United States) Holloman LC-A | | (United States) US Air Force | |
| 10 November | | AFCRC | Suborbital | Aeronomy | 10 November | Successful |
| 13 November; 11:52 | (United Kingdom) Skylark (Raven 1) | SL04 | (Australia) Woomera LA-2 SL | | (Australia) WRE / (United Kingdom) RAE | |
| 13 November; 11:52 | | University College London | Suborbital | Aeronomy | 13 November | Successful |
| 13 November; 11:52 | Apogee: 127 kilometres (79 mi), first British spaceflight | | | | | |
| 19 November; 16:29:56 | (United States) Aerobee (unknown type) | | (United States) Holloman LC-A | | (United States) US Air Force | |
| 19 November; 16:29:56 | (United States) Smoke Puff | AFCRC | Suborbital | Aeronomy | 19 November | Successful |
| 19 November; 16:29:56 | Apogee: 121 kilometres (75 mi), released potassium nitrate and aluminium to create a temporary 'radio mirror' | | | | | |
| 26 November; 12:55 | (United States) Aerobee (unknown type) | | (United States) Holloman LC-A | | (United States) US Air Force | |
| 26 November; 12:55 | | AFCRC | Suborbital | Aeronomy | 26 November | Successful |
| 27 November; 02:10 | (United States) SM-78 Jupiter | | (United States) Cape Canaveral LC-26B | | (United States) US Air Force | |
| 27 November; 02:10 | | ABMA | Suborbital | Missile test | 27 November | Partial failure |
| 27 November; 02:10 | Apogee: 20 kilometres (12 mi), mechanical failure of turbo-pump caused loss of thrust and missile exploded. Other primary and secondary flight objectives were considered successful. | | | | | |
| 30 November | (Soviet Union) R-5M | | (Soviet Union) Kapustin Yar | | (Soviet Union) OKB-1 | |
| 30 November | | OKB-1 | Suborbital | Missile test | 30 November | Successful |
| 7 December; 22:11 | (United States) XSM-75 Thor | 112 | (United States) Cape Canaveral LC-17B | | (United States) US Air Force | |
| 7 December; 22:11 | | ARDC | Suborbital | Missile test | 7 December | Successful |
| 7 December; 22:11 | Start of R&D Series II | | | | | |
| 10 December; 17:35 | (United States) Nike-Cajun | OB6.02F | (United States) White Sands | | (United States) University of Michigan / US Army | |
| 10 December; 17:35 | | BRL | Suborbital | Ionospheric / Fields | 10 December | Successful |
| 10 December; 17:35 | Apogee: 145 kilometres (90 mi) | | | | | |
| 10 December; 18:12 | (United States) Nike-Asp | NN8.51F | (United States) San Nicolas | | (United States) US Navy | |
| 10 December; 18:12 | | NRL | Suborbital | Test flight | 10 December | Successful |
| 10 December; 18:12 | Apogee: 169 kilometres (105 mi) | | | | | |
| 10 December; 21:36 | (United States) Nike-Cajun | SS6.39 | (Canada) Churchill | | (United States) University of Michigan / US Army | |
| 10 December; 21:36 | | USASC | Suborbital | Aeronomy | 10 December | Launch failure |
| 12 December; 04:00 | (United States) Aerobee (unknown type) | SM1.07 | (Canada) Churchill | | (United States) US Army | |
| 12 December; 04:00 | (United States) Grenades | AFCRC / University of Michigan | Suborbital | Aeronomy | 12 December | Successful |
| 12 December; 04:00 | Apogee: 80 kilometres (50 mi) | | | | | |
| 14 December; 21:00 | (United States) Aerobee (unknown type) | SM1.08 | (Canada) Churchill | | (United States) US Army | |
| 14 December; 21:00 | (United States) Grenades | USASC / University of Michigan | Suborbital | Aeronomy | 14 December | Successful |
| 14 December; 21:00 | Apogee: 97 kilometres (60 mi) | | | | | |
| 15 December; 00:38 | (United States) Nike-Cajun | AM6.34 | (Canada) Churchill | | (United States) University of Michigan / US Army | |
| 15 December; 00:38 | | University of Michigan / ARDC | Suborbital | Aeronomy | 15 December | Launch failure |
| 15 December; 00:38 | Apogee: 9 kilometres (5.6 mi) | | | | | |
| 17 December; 17:39 | (United States) XSM-65A Atlas | 12A | (United States) Cape Canaveral LC-14 | | (United States) US Air Force | |
| 17 December; 17:39 | | ARDC | Suborbital | Test flight | 17 December | Successful |
| 17 December; 17:39 | First successful Atlas launch | | | | | |
| 19 December; 00:07 | (United States) SM-78 Jupiter | | (United States) Cape Canaveral LC-26B | | (United States) US Air Force | |
| 19 December; 00:07 | | ABMA | Suborbital | Missile test | 19 December | Partial failure |
| 19 December; 00:07 | Apogee: 92 kilometres (57 mi), mechanical failure of turbo-pump caused loss of thrust at 116.87 seconds. Other primary and secondary flight objectives were considered successful. | | | | | |
| 19 December; 19:57 | (United States) XSM-75 Thor | 113 | (United States) Cape Canaveral LC-17A | | (United States) US Air Force | |
| 19 December; 19:57 | | ARDC | Suborbital | Missile test | 19 December | Successful |
| 23 December | (United States) Nike-Cajun | | (United States) Wallops Island | | (United States) NACA | |
| 23 December | (United States) HUGO 2 | New Mexico State University | Suborbital | Aeronomy / Hurricane photography | 23 December | Launch failure |
| 26 December | (Soviet Union) R-5M | M1-3 | (Soviet Union) Kapustin Yar | | (Soviet Union) OKB-1 | |
| 26 December | (Soviet Union) Generator-5 | OKB-1 | Suborbital | Missile test | 26 December | Successful |
| Unknown | (United States) Terrapin | | (United States) Wallops Island | | (United States) NSA | |
| Unknown | | University of Maryland | Suborbital | Chemical Release | Same day | Successful |
| Unknown | (United States) Terrapin | | (United States) Wallops Island | | (United States) NSA | |
| Unknown | | University of Maryland | Suborbital | Chemical Release | Same day | Successful |
| Unknown | (United States) Terrapin | | (United States) Wallops Island | | (United States) NSA | |
| Unknown | | University of Maryland | Suborbital | Chemical Release | Same day | Successful |
| Unknown | (United States) Terrapin | | (United States) Wallops Island | | (United States) NSA | |
| Unknown | | University of Maryland | Suborbital | Chemical Release | Same day | Successful |
| Unknown | Final flight of the Terrapin | | | | | |

== Orbital launch statistics ==
=== By country ===
Launches by country
| Country | Launches | Successes | Failures | Partial failures | Remarks |
|---|---|---|---|---|---|
| Soviet Union | 2 (Note: First orbital launch) | 1 | 0 | 1 | |
| United States | 1 | 0 | 1 | 0 | |

=== By rocket ===
| Rocket | Country | Type | Family | Launches | Successes | Failures | Partial failures | Remarks |
|---|---|---|---|---|---|---|---|---|
| Sputnik-PS (8K71PS) | Soviet Union | Sputnik | R-7 | 2 | 1 | 0 | 1 | Maiden flight, first Soviet orbital flight and satellite, retired |
| Vanguard | United States | Vanguard | Viking | 1 | 0 | 1 | 0 | Maiden flight, first US orbital attempt |

=== By launch site ===
| Site | Country | Launches | Successes | Failures | Partial failures | Remarks |
|---|---|---|---|---|---|---|
| Baikonur | Soviet Union | 2 | 1 | 0 | 1 | |
| Cape Canaveral | United States | 1 | 0 | 1 | 0 | |

=== By orbit ===
| Orbital regime | Launches | Successes | Failures | Accidentally Achieved | Remarks |
|---|---|---|---|---|---|
| Low Earth | 2 | 2 | 0 | 0 | |
| Medium Earth | 1 | 0 | 1 | 0 | |

== Launch statistics ==
=== By country ===
Launches by country
| Country | Launches | Successes | Failures | Partial failures |
|---|---|---|---|---|
| Australia | 1 | 1 | 0 | 0 |
| Soviet Union | 106 | 102 | 3 | 1 |
| United Kingdom | 4 | 4 | 0 | 0 |
| United States | 170 | 119 | 46 | 5 |
| World | 281 | 226 | 49 | 6 |

=== By rocket ===
- Viking (second model)
- Vanguard
- Aerobee RTV-N-10
- Aerobee RTV-N-10c
- Aerobee Hi (NRL)
- Aerobee RTV-A-1a
- Aerobee Hi (USAF)
- Aerobee AJ10-34
- Aerobee (Unknown)
- Loki rockoon
- Farside
- Nike-Deacon
- Nike-Cajun
- Terrapin
- Nike-Asp
- X-17
- Polaris FTV-5
- Polaris FTV-3
- HJ-Nike
- HJ-Nike-Nike
- Jupiter-C
- SM-78 Jupiter
- XSM-75 Thor
- XSM-65A Atlas
- R-1
- A-1
- R-2
- R-2A
- R-5M
- R-7
- Sputnik-PS (8K71PS)
- R-12
- Skylark (Raven 1)
- Long Tom

Launches by rocket
| Rocket | Country | Launches | Successes | Failures | Partial failures | Remarks |
|---|---|---|---|---|---|---|
| Viking (second model) | United States | 1 | 1 | 0 | 0 | Retired |
| Vanguard | United States | 2 | 1 | 1 | 0 | Maiden flight, first US orbital attempt |
| Aerobee RTV-N-10 | United States | 1 | 1 | 0 | 0 | Retired |
| Aerobee RTV-N-10c | United States | 1 | 1 | 0 | 0 | Retired |
| Aerobee Hi (NRL) | United States | 6 | 5 | 1 | 0 | |
| Aerobee RTV-A-1a | United States | 1 | 1 | 0 | 0 | Retired |
| Aerobee Hi (USAF) | United States | 3 | 3 | 0 | 0 | |
| Aerobee AJ10-34 | United States | 2 | 2 | 0 | 0 | |
| Aerobee (Unknown Type) | United States | 21 | 19 | 2 | 0 | |
| Loki rockoon | United States | 57 | 44 | 13 | 0 | Retired |
| Farside | United States | 6 | 0 | 6 | 0 | Maiden flight, retired |
| Nike-Deacon | United States | 13 | 7 | 6 | 0 | Retired |
| Nike-Cajun | United States | 9 | 4 | 5 | 0 | |
| Terrapin | United States | 4 | 4 | 0 | 0 | Retired |
| Nike-Asp | United States | 2 | 1 | 1 | 0 | Maiden flight |
| X-17 | United States | 9 | 7 | 2 | 0 | |
| Polaris FTV-5 | United States | 2 | 1 | 1 | 0 | Maiden flight, retired |
| Polaris FTV-3 | United States | 4 | 4 | 0 | 0 | Maiden flight, retired |
| HJ-Nike | United States | 3 | 3 | 0 | 0 | |
| HJ-Nike-Nike | United States | 1 | 1 | 0 | 0 | Maiden flight |
| Jupiter-C | United States | 2 | 1 | 1 | 0 | |
| SM-78 Jupiter | United States | 7 | 3 | 1 | 3 | Maiden flight |
| XSM-75 Thor | United States | 10 | 4 | 5 | 1 | Maiden flight |
| XSM-65A Atlas | United States | 3 | 1 | 0 | 2 | Maiden flight |
| R-1 | Soviet Union | 18 | 18 | 0 | 0 | |
| A-1 | Soviet Union | 1 | 1 | 0 | 0 | |
| R-2 | Soviet Union | 37 | 37 | 0 | 0 | |
| R-2A | Soviet Union | 18 | 18 | 0 | 0 | Maiden flight |
| R-5M | Soviet Union | 19 | 19 | 0 | 0 | |
| R-7 | Soviet Union | 4 | 2 | 2 | 0 | Maiden flight |
| Sputnik-PS (8K71PS) | Soviet Union | 2 | 1 | 0 | 1 | Maiden flight, first Soviet orbital flight and satellite, retired |
| R-12 | Soviet Union | 7 | 6 | 1 | 0 | Maiden flight |
| Skylark (Raven 1) | United Kingdom | 4 | 4 | 0 | 0 | Maiden flight, first British spaceflight |
| Long Tom | Australia | 1 | 1 | 0 | 0 | Maiden flight, first Australian spaceflight |

== See also ==
- Timeline of spaceflight
- Pre-1963 Designations Of U.S. Missiles And Drones
