= 1956 in spaceflight =

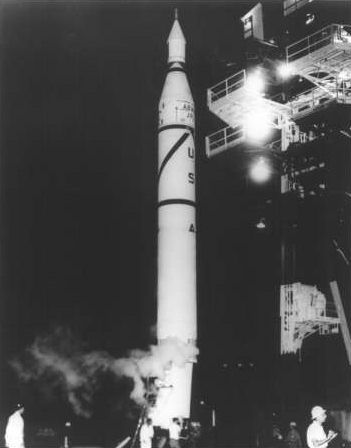
- The Jupiter-C rocket made its maiden flight in 1956

Rockets
- Maiden flights: (United States) Aerobee AJ10-34 (United States) Nike-Cajun (United States) Terrapin (United States) Jupiter-C (Soviet Union) R-1UK (Soviet Union) R-5RD (Soviet Union) R-5R (Japan) Kappa 1
- Retirements: (United States) Aerobee XASR-SC-1 (United States) Aerobee RTV-A-1a (United States) Deacon rockoon (United States) Nike-Nike-T40-T55 (Soviet Union) R-1E (Soviet Union) R-1UK (Soviet Union) R-5RD (Soviet Union) R-5R

1956 in spaceflight

Preparation for the 18-month International Geophysical Year (IGY), scheduled to begin July 1957, became a truly international endeavor in 1956. The American IGY satellite program, Project Vanguard, saw its first test launch at the end of the year, while the Army Ballistic Missile Agency tested Redstone-derived rockets, culminating in the Jupiter-C capable of orbiting a satellite. The Soviet Union developed the engines and tested vital components for its first ICBM, the R-7 Semyorka, which would fly the USSR's first artificial satellite, "Object D:

Japan developed the Kappa 1 sounding rocket with an eye toward an advanced version that would fly during the IGY, and Canada, with the assistance of the United States, established a sounding rocket range in Churchill, Manitoba. In Italy, Rome hosted the Seventh International Aeronautical Congress, which saw 400 delegates from the scientific community and representatives of (mostly American) industry gather to discuss the technical aspects of spaceflight.

Both superpowers conducted a multitude of sounding rocket flights, probing the upper atmosphere with increasing sophistication and cadence. In addition, the Soviets completed a series of capsule launches, each with two dog passengers—a prelude to human missions in space.

== Space exploration highlights ==
=== Sounding Rockets ===
==== American efforts ====
The primary sounding rocket of the United States for 1956 was the Aerobee in a variety of models. Launched mostly (but not exclusively) from sites in New Mexico, missions were conducted by a myriad of agencies, both military and civilian, to probe and return information about the upper atmosphere. The University of Michigan utilized the Nike-Cajun sounding rocket, launched from the USS Rushmore in the Labrador Sea, to conduct aeronomy research. The Air Force launched its X-17 rocket a number of times, mostly testing reentry vehicles for ballistic missile use.

==== Soviet efforts ====
The year saw the completion of the second series of Soviet suborbital flights with dogs as payloads. After the completion of the nine-launch series, conducted with variations of the R-1 rocket, the results were published as "Vital Activity of Animals during Rocket Flights into the Upper Atmosphere" in December 1956 at an international conference in Paris. These flights made it clear that advanced animals could survive the rigors of space launch, reentry, and weightlessness. They also tested spacesuits, parachute recovery of space travelers, and radio telemetry.

Also completed this year was the second series of Academik flights, which involved 18 sounding rocket launches between 1953 and 1956. These missions returned scientific data on cosmic rays, the atmosphere, the content and temperature of the ionosphere as well as information useful to engineers: winds, temperature, pressure and radio wave propagation at high altitudes.

=== Seventh International Aeronautical Congress ===
Organized by the Italian rocket society under the auspices of the International Astronautical Federation, it was held 17–22 September at the Palazzo dei Congressi, 15 km (9.3 mi) from Rome. 400 delegates from astronautical societies and research institutes, as well as representatives of (mostly American) large industrial interests attended. The first day of the conference and a quarter of the 45 papers read before the conference were directly related to artificial Earth satellites.

== Spacecraft development ==
=== United States ===
==== Project Vanguard ====
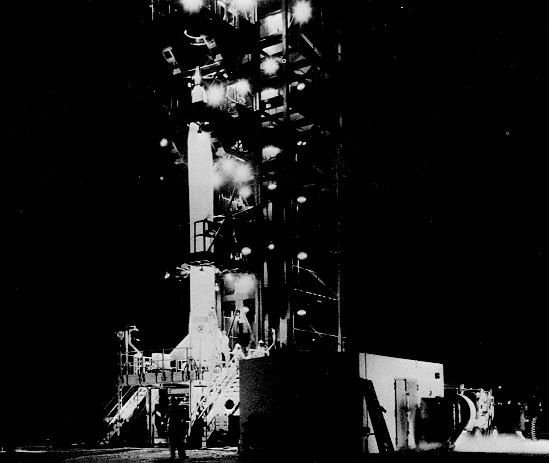
Vanguard_rocket-04

Work continued apace on Project Vanguard, the civilian satellite project initiated in fall 1955. Vanguard consisted of a tiny satellite and a rocket launcher, the latter comprising a Viking (rocket) first stage mated with two smaller rocket stages. Starting in 1956, John T. Mengel and his Naval Research Laboratory Tracking and Guiding Branch began designing the Minitrack system, a worldwide network of stations that would receive data on 108 MHz broadcast by Vanguard's tiny transmitter. In April 1946, work began on a global optical tracking network as well, whose task would be to locate the satellite in the sky so that Minitrack could maintain continuous tracking. In addition to twelve observation stations around the world, amateurs were also recruited to assist. While it would have been logistically useful to have Minitrack and optical stations at the same site, the two types of stations had different requirements—the radio stations requiring flat ground away from interference, and the visual stations needing clear skies. In the end, only Woomera in Australia had a combined tracking station.

The first Vanguard test flight took place in the early morning of 8 December 1956 and involved the launch of an unmodified Viking rocket (#13). The purpose of Vanguard TV-0 was to familiarize the Vanguard team with launch operations, and to test the range safety and tracking systems at Cape Canaveral's Air Force Missile Test Center (AFMTC). TV-0 reached an altitude of 126.5 mi (203.6 km) and a range of 97.6 mi (157.1 km). 120 seconds into the flight, the rocket ejected a small sphere equipped with a Minitrack transmitter. Its broadcasts were picked up without difficulty by AFMTC's tracking stations before the little device hit the Atlantic Ocean. A post-flight evaluation conducted mid-December determined that the rocket's performance had been "either satisfactory or superior", that rocket-borne instrumentation and telemetry had been "excellent", and that ground coverage of the instrumentation had been "adequate". This successful flight paved the way for Vanguard's first multi-stage launch, scheduled for the following year.

==== Project Orbiter ====
In 1956, the Army Ballistic Missile Agency (ABMA) continued trying to gain support of Project Orbiter, an Army plan to use a slightly modified Redstone (a 200 miles (320 km) range surface-to-surface missile developed the prior year) combined with upper stages employing 31 Loki solid-propellant rockets to put a 5 lb (2.3 kg) satellite into orbit, which could be tracked optically. Though Orbiter had been officially rejected the year before in favor of Vanguard, ABMA hoped Redstone-Orbiter could still be used as a backup orbital system. Reentry tests that year conducted with the newly developed, Redstone-based Jupiter-C, further strengthened ABMA confidence in their vehicle as an orbital launcher. Though Orbiter remained unapproved, late in the year the Army did authorize production and firing of 12 Jupiter-Cs for nosecone reentry tests. This set the stage for the Jupiter-C to be the de facto backup in the event of Vanguard's failure.

==== Long-range missiles ====
Development of an ICBM was given paramount importance by the United States government on the heels of a secret report made in February 1955 by James Rhyne Killian to the National Security Council on Soviet rocket progress. Not only was the 5,500 km (3,400 mi)-range Atlas, America's first ICBM, made the highest-priority project in the nation, but Titan, a more capable ICBM, was authorized for development as well. By late 1956, the Convair-produced Atlas was being configured for launch operations. On 10 October 1956, a non-flying Atlas arrived at Cape Canaveral in Florida, where it was checked for compatibility with the Cape's existing launch facilities. Test flights of the first "Series A" run of missiles would begin in 1957.

With development of the Atlas expected to take some time, the Thor Intermediate-range ballistic missile (IRBM), with a range of 2,500 km (1,600 mi), had been authorized in 1955 to be developed and deployed in Europe in just three years. The Douglas-produced Thor, the first missile to use inertial guidance, had its basic configuration and size frozen in January 1956. Engine testing began in March 1956 with the first engine delivered by Rocketdyne in August, by which time the inertial guidance system was finished as well. The same month, warhead data was provided to General Electric, which had been contracted to produce the missile's nose cone. The size of the nose cone was fixed in September. Test launches of the completed missile would take place in 1957.

The US Army's Wernher von Braun-led Guided Missile Development Division team, that had recently developed the Redstone, was working on its own IRBM, dubbed Jupiter in April 1956. United States Secretary of Defense Charles Wilson authorized this missile in September 1955, to be jointly developed by the Army and the US Navy. The PGM-19 Jupiter would have the same range as the Thor, and it was planned to be deployed by 1961.

All of these missiles were ultimately adapted into orbital delivery rockets.

=== Soviet Union ===
==== R-7 Semyorka ICBM ====
R-7 Semyorka ICBM

Full-scale tests of the RD-108 rocket engines that would power the R-7 Semyorka, the Soviet Union's first ICBM, began in January 1956. That same month, work began in earnest on "Site 1", the launch pad at Ministry of Defense Scientific-Research and Test Firing Range No.5 (NIIP-5), located in the Kazakh Soviet Socialist Republic (now Kazakhstan) near the Syr-Darya river. Completed by the end of May, the platform measured 250 m (820 ft) by 100 m (330 ft) by 45 m (148 ft). An exact duplicate was set up for testing and validation purposes in Leningrad, and a full-scale test version of the R-7 was subjected to wind tests thereon. On 5 October, workers finished the road connecting Site 1 and the living settlement at Site 10, nicknamed Zarya.

==== Other Soviet missiles ====
On 2 February 1956, an R-5M Medium-range ballistic missile (MRBM) was the first rocket to fly carrying a live nuclear warhead. In May and June 1956, three R-5R missiles—R-5Ms with their nuclear payloads replaced with radio control instrument packages—were the first Soviet missiles to be launched with radio guidance. The ground stations developed to control these missiles served as prototypes for those being built to support R-7 operations. A series of ten launches of another R5 variant, the M-5RD, tested other R-7 components including guidance, stabilization, and propellant feed. All of these launches were successful.

==== Object D, the first Soviet satellite project ====
On 30 January 1956, the Soviet government approved Resolution #149-88, authorizing "Object D". This was a satellite massing 1,000 kg (2,200 lb) to 1,400 kg (3,100 lb), about a fourth of which would be devoted to scientific instruments. This proposal, created in 1955 by engineer Mikhail Tikhonravov, had been endorsed by Soviet leader Nikita Khrushchev upon learning that Object D would outmass the announced American satellite by nearly 1,000 times. Work on the project began in February 1956 with a planned launch date of latter 1957. The design was finalized on 24 July.

By the 1956, it had become clear that the complicated Object D would not be finished in time for a 1957 launch. Thus, in December 1956, OKB-1 head Sergei Korolev proposed the development of two simpler satellites: PS, Prosteishy Sputnik, or Preliminary Satellite. The two PS satellites would be simple spheres massing 83.4 kg (184 lb) and equipped solely with a radio antenna. The project was approved by the government on 25 January 1957.

=== Japan ===
In 1955, Japan developed its first experimental rocket, the 23 cm (9.1 in) long Pencil. With an eye toward developing a sounding rocket that could meet the 60 km (37 mi) to 100 km (62 mi) minimum altitude requirement for the IGY, the Japanese began development of the Kappa series of rockets, the last of which would fulfill the IGY height limit. Kappa 1, first in this series, 128 mm in diameter and with an initial acceleration of 25 gees, was launched seven times in 1956.

=== Canada ===
Under the aegis of Canada's Defense Research Board, the United States Army built the Churchill Rocket Research Range 24 km (15 mi) east of Churchill, Manitoba. Due to its proximity to the north magnetic pole, it offered an excellent vantage from which to explore auroral activity. Sounding rocket launches began in October 1956, and the facility would become the nation's premier upper atmosphere research center.

== Launches ==
- ← Jan
- Feb
- Mar
- Apr
- May
- Jun
- Jul
- Aug
- Sep
- Oct
- Nov
- Dec →

=== January ===
January launches
Date and time (UTC)	Rocket	Flight number	Launch site		LSP	
Date and time (UTC)	Payload	Operator	Orbit	Function	Decay (UTC)	Outcome
Date and time (UTC)	Remarks					
11 January	(Soviet Union) R-5M		(Soviet Union) Kapustin Yar		(Soviet Union) OKB-1	
11 January		OKB-1	Suborbital	Missile test	11 January	Successful
17 January	(Soviet Union) R-5M		(Soviet Union) Kapustin Yar		(Soviet Union) OKB-1	
17 January		OKB-1	Suborbital	Missile test	17 January	Successful
20 January	(United States) X-17		(United States) Cape Canaveral LC-3		(United States) US Air Force	
20 January		ARDC	Suborbital	Test flight	20 January	Successful
20 January	Apogee: 132 kilometres (82 mi)					
21 January	(Soviet Union) R-1		(Soviet Union) Kapustin Yar		(Soviet Union) OKB-1	
21 January		OKB-1	Suborbital	Missile test	21 January	Successful
21 January	(Soviet Union) R-5M		(Soviet Union) Kapustin Yar		(Soviet Union) OKB-1	
21 January		OKB-1	Suborbital	Missile test	21 January	Successful
24 January	(Soviet Union) R-1		(Soviet Union) Kapustin Yar		(Soviet Union) OKB-1	
24 January		OKB-1	Suborbital	Missile test	24 January	Successful
24 January	(Soviet Union) R-1		(Soviet Union) Kapustin Yar		(Soviet Union) OKB-1	
24 January		OKB-1	Suborbital	Missile test	24 January	Launch failure

=== February ===
February launches
Date and time (UTC)	Rocket	Flight number	Launch site		LSP	
Date and time (UTC)	Payload	Operator	Orbit	Function	Decay (UTC)	Outcome
Date and time (UTC)	Remarks					
2 February	(Soviet Union) R-5M		(Soviet Union) Kapustin Yar		(Soviet Union) OKB-1	
2 February	(Soviet Union) Baykal	MVS	Suborbital	Nuclear weapon test	2 February	Successful
2 February	First launch of a missile carrying a live nuclear warhead					
6 February	(Soviet Union) R-5M		(Soviet Union) Kapustin Yar		(Soviet Union) OKB-1	
6 February		OKB-1	Suborbital	Missile test	6 February	Successful
13 February	(Soviet Union) R-1		(Soviet Union) Kapustin Yar		(Soviet Union) OKB-1	
13 February		OKB-1	Suborbital	Missile test	13 February	Successful
14 February	(Soviet Union) R-1		(Soviet Union) Kapustin Yar		(Soviet Union) OKB-1	
14 February		OKB-1	Suborbital	Missile test	14 February	Successful
16 February	(Soviet Union) R-5RD		(Soviet Union) Kapustin Yar		(Soviet Union) OKB-1	
16 February		MVS	Suborbital	R-7 component test	16 February	Successful
16 February	Maiden flight of the R-5RD (or M5RD)					
17 February	(Soviet Union) R-2		(Soviet Union) Kapustin Yar		(Soviet Union) OKB-1	
17 February		OKB-1	Suborbital	Missile test	17 February	Successful

=== March ===
March launches
Date and time (UTC)	Rocket	Flight number	Launch site		LSP	
Date and time (UTC)	Payload	Operator	Orbit	Function	Decay (UTC)	Outcome
Date and time (UTC)	Remarks					
5 March	(United States) X-17		(United States) Cape Canaveral LC-3		(United States) US Air Force	
5 March		ARDC	Suborbital	Test flight	5 March	Successful
5 March	Apogee: 116 kilometres (72 mi)					
7 March	(Soviet Union) R-5RD		(Soviet Union) Kapustin Yar		(Soviet Union) OKB-1	
7 March		MVS	Suborbital	R-7 component test	7 March	Successful
9 March	(Soviet Union) R-2		(Soviet Union) Kapustin Yar		(Soviet Union) OKB-1	
9 March		OKB-1	Suborbital	Missile test	9 March	Successful
12 March; 21:15	(United States) Aerobee RTV-A-1a	USAF 62	(United States) Holloman LC-A		(United States) US Air Force	
12 March; 21:15		AFCRC	Suborbital	Ionospheric	12 March	Successful
12 March; 21:15	Apogee: 95 kilometres (59 mi)					
14 March; 08:45	(United States) Aerobee RTV-A-1a	USAF 63	(United States) Holloman LC-A		(United States) US Air Force	
14 March; 08:45		AFCRC	Suborbital	Ionospheric / Aeronomy	14 March	Successful
14 March; 08:45	Apogee: 106 kilometres (66 mi)					
15 March	(Soviet Union) R-5RD		(Soviet Union) Kapustin Yar		(Soviet Union) OKB-1	
15 March		MVS	Suborbital	R-7 component test	15 March	Successful
17 March	(Soviet Union) R-5RD		(Soviet Union) Kapustin Yar		(Soviet Union) OKB-1	
17 March		MVS	Suborbital	R-7 component test	17 March	Successful
23 March	(Soviet Union) R-5RD		(Soviet Union) Kapustin Yar		(Soviet Union) OKB-1	
23 March		MVS	Suborbital	R-7 component test	23 March	Successful
28 March	(Soviet Union) R-1		(Soviet Union) Kapustin Yar		(Soviet Union) OKB-1	
28 March		OKB-1	Suborbital	Missile test	28 March	Successful

=== April ===
April launches
Date and time (UTC)	Rocket	Flight number	Launch site		LSP	
Date and time (UTC)	Payload	Operator	Orbit	Function	Decay (UTC)	Outcome
Date and time (UTC)	Remarks					
9 April	(United States) HJ-Nike		(United States) Wallops Island		(United States) NACA	
9 April		NACA	Suborbital	Test flight	9 April	Successful
9 April	Apogee: 10 kilometres (6.2 mi)					
12 April; 02:05	(United States) Aerobee RTV-A-1a	USAF 64	(United States) Holloman LC-A		(United States) US Air Force	
12 April; 02:05	(United States) Sodium Release 3	AFCRC	Suborbital	Ionospheric / Aeronomy	12 April	Successful
12 April; 02:05	Apogee: 106 kilometres (66 mi)					
16 April	(Soviet Union) R-1		(Soviet Union) Kapustin Yar		(Soviet Union) OKB-1	
16 April		OKB-1	Suborbital	Missile test	16 April	Successful
17 April	(United States) X-17		(United States) Cape Canaveral LC-3		(United States) US Air Force	
17 April		ARDC	Suborbital	REV test	17 April	Successful
17 April	Apogee: 100 kilometres (62 mi)					
29 April	(Soviet Union) R-2		(Soviet Union) Kapustin Yar		(Soviet Union) OKB-1	
29 April		OKB-1	Suborbital	Missile test	29 April	Successful

=== May ===
May launches
Date and time (UTC)	Rocket	Flight number	Launch site		LSP	
Date and time (UTC)	Payload	Operator	Orbit	Function	Decay (UTC)	Outcome
Date and time (UTC)	Remarks					
1 May; 22:05	(United States) Aerobee Hi	NRL 39	(United States) White Sands LC-35		(United States) US Navy	
1 May; 22:05		NRL	Suborbital	Test flight	1 May	Launch failure
1 May; 22:05	Apogee: 4 kilometres (2.5 mi), Navy variant designation: RV-N-13a					
8 May	(Soviet Union) R-1UK		(Soviet Union) Kapustin Yar		(Soviet Union) OKB-1	
8 May		OKB-1	Suborbital	Project T-3	8 May	Successful
8 May	(Soviet Union) R-2		(Soviet Union) Kapustin Yar		(Soviet Union) OKB-1	
8 May		OKB-1	Suborbital	Missile test	8 May	Successful
8 May; 14:54	(United States) Aerobee AJ10-34	USAF 65	(United States) Holloman LC-A		(United States) US Air Force	
8 May; 14:54		AFCRC / University of Colorado	Suborbital	Solar UV	8 May	Successful
8 May; 14:54	Apogee: 143 kilometres (89 mi), maiden flight of the Aerobee AJ10-34; at apogee, several photographs were taken of the Sun in Lyman-alpha (1215 angstroms) wavelength using lithium fluoride optics. The low resolution pictures revealed "considerably enhanced Lyman a radiation in the active spot and plage areas on the sun at the time of the flight." A spectrogram of the Sun was also taken.					
8 May; 15:15	(United States) Aerobee Hi	NRL 42	(United States) White Sands LC-35		(United States) US Navy	
8 May; 15:15		NRL	Suborbital	Test flight	8 May	Launch failure
8 May; 15:15	Apogee: 188 kilometres (117 mi), Navy variant designation: RV-N-13a					
10 May	(Soviet Union) R-1UK		(Soviet Union) Kapustin Yar		(Soviet Union) OKB-1	
10 May		OKB-1	Suborbital	Project T-3	10 May	Successful
14 May	(Soviet Union) R-1E		(Soviet Union) Kapustin Yar		(Soviet Union) OKB-1	
14 May		OKB-1	Suborbital	Biological	14 May	Successful
14 May	Carried dogs, all recovered					
16 May	(Soviet Union) R-1UK		(Soviet Union) Kapustin Yar		(Soviet Union) OKB-1	
16 May		OKB-1	Suborbital	Project T-3	16 May	Successful
16 May; 15:40	(United States) Aerobee Hi	USAF 66	(United States) Holloman LC-A		(United States) US Air Force	
16 May; 15:40		AFCRC	Suborbital	Test flight	16 May	Launch failure
16 May; 15:40	Apogee: 169 kilometres (105 mi)					
31 May; 02:57	(Soviet Union) R-1E		(Soviet Union) Kapustin Yar		(Soviet Union) OKB-1	
31 May; 02:57		OKB-1	Suborbital	Biological / Solar UV	31 May	Successful
31 May; 02:57	Carried dogs Malyshka and Linda, all recovered					
31 May	(Soviet Union) R-5R		(Soviet Union) Kapustin Yar		(Soviet Union) OKB-1	
31 May		MVS	Suborbital	Radio guidance test	31 May	Successful
31 May	Maiden flight of the R-5R					

=== June ===
June launches
Date and time (UTC)	Rocket	Flight number	Launch site		LSP	
Date and time (UTC)	Payload	Operator	Orbit	Function	Decay (UTC)	Outcome
Date and time (UTC)	Remarks					
4 June; 14:13	(United States) Aerobee Hi	NRL 46	(United States) White Sands LC-35		(United States) US Navy	
4 June; 14:13		NRL	Suborbital	Solar UV	4 June	Launch failure
4 June; 14:13	Apogee: 58 kilometres (36 mi), Navy variant designation: RV-N-13a					
6 June	(Soviet Union) R-1UK		(Soviet Union) Kapustin Yar		(Soviet Union) OKB-1	
6 June		OKB-1	Suborbital	Project T-3	6 June	Successful
7 June	(Soviet Union) R-1E		(Soviet Union) Kapustin Yar		(Soviet Union) OKB-1	
7 June		OKB-1	Suborbital	Biological	7 June	Successful
7 June	carried dogs Albina and Kozyavka on final(?) flight of the R-1E; dogs recovered					
7 June	(Soviet Union) R-5R		(Soviet Union) Kapustin Yar		(Soviet Union) OKB-1	
7 June		MVS	Suborbital	Radio guidance test	7 June	Successful
7 June	(United States) Nike-Nike-T40-T55		(United States) Wallops Island		(United States) NACA	
7 June		NACA	Suborbital	REV test	7 June	Successful
7 June	Apogee: 100 kilometres (62 mi), final flight of the Nike-Nike-T40-T55					
8 June	(Soviet Union) R-1UK		(Soviet Union) Kapustin Yar		(Soviet Union) OKB-1	
8 June		OKB-1	Suborbital	Project T-3	8 June	Successful
12 June	(Soviet Union) R-1UK		(Soviet Union) Kapustin Yar		(Soviet Union) OKB-1	
12 June		OKB-1	Suborbital	Project T-3	12 June	Successful
12 June	(Soviet Union) R-1UK		(Soviet Union) Kapustin Yar		(Soviet Union) OKB-1	
12 June		OKB-1	Suborbital	Project T-3	12 June	Successful
13 June; 20:51	(United States) Aerobee AJ10-34	USAF 67	(United States) Holloman LC-A		(United States) US Air Force	
13 June; 20:51		AFCRC / University of Utah	Suborbital	Ionospheric	13 June	Successful
13 June; 20:51	Apogee: 137.8 kilometres (85.6 mi)					
14 June	(Soviet Union) R-1E		(Soviet Union) Kapustin Yar		(Soviet Union) OKB-1	
14 June		OKB-1	Suborbital	Biological	14 June	Unknown
14 June	carried dogs Albina and Kozyavka on final(?) flight of the R-1E (flight not listed on Mark Wade's site—see reference)					
15 June	(Soviet Union) R-5R		(Soviet Union) Kapustin Yar		(Soviet Union) OKB-1	
15 June		MVS	Suborbital	Radio guidance test	15 June	Successful
15 June	Final flight of the R-5R					
18 June	(Soviet Union) R-1UK		(Soviet Union) Kapustin Yar		(Soviet Union) OKB-1	
18 June		OKB-1	Suborbital	Project T-3	18 June	Successful
18 June; 20:42	(United States) Aerobee AJ10-34	USAF 68	(United States) Holloman LC-A		(United States) US Air Force	
18 June; 20:42		AFCRC / University of Utah	Suborbital	Ionospheric	18 June	Successful
18 June; 20:42	Apogee: 137 kilometres (85 mi)					
20 June	(Soviet Union) R-1UK		(Soviet Union) Kapustin Yar		(Soviet Union) OKB-1	
20 June		OKB-1	Suborbital	Project T-3	20 June	Successful
21 June	(Soviet Union) R-1UK		(Soviet Union) Kapustin Yar		(Soviet Union) OKB-1	
21 June		OKB-1	Suborbital	Project T-3	21 June	Successful
21 June	Final flight of the R-1UK					
21 June; 18:48	(United States) Aerobee AJ10-34	USAF 69	(United States) Holloman LC-A		(United States) US Air Force	
21 June; 18:48		AFCRC / University of Utah	Suborbital	Ionospheric	21 June	Successful
21 June; 18:48	Apogee: 146 kilometres (91 mi)					
22 June; 19:42	(United States) Aerobee RTV-N-10	NRL 22	(United States) White Sands LC-35		(United States) US Navy	
22 June; 19:42		NRL	Suborbital	Ionospheric	22 June	Launch failure
22 June; 19:42	Apogee: 5 kilometres (3.1 mi)					
26 June	(United States) X-17		(United States) Cape Canaveral LC-3		(United States) US Air Force	
26 June		ARDC	Suborbital	Test flight	26 June	Successful
26 June	Apogee: 140 kilometres (87 mi)					
26 June; 18:26	(United States) Aerobee AJ10-34	USAF 70	(United States) Holloman LC-A		(United States) US Air Force	
26 June; 18:26		AFCRC / University of Utah	Suborbital	Ionospheric	26 June	Successful
26 June; 18:26	Apogee: 111 kilometres (69 mi)					
29 June; 19:09	(United States) Aerobee Hi	NRL 50	(United States) White Sands LC-35		(United States) US Navy	
29 June; 19:09		NRL	Suborbital	Ionospheric	29 June	Successful
29 June; 19:09	Apogee: 263.7 kilometres (163.9 mi), Navy variant designation: RV-N-13b (Rocket #50); measured electron densities in the ionosphere by sending radio signals on two frequencies (7.75 and 46.5 Mhz) and determining how their Doppler shift was affected by the refractive index of the material near the rocket. The results confirmed "the general structure of the daytime ionosphere above White Sands as deduced from previous NRL flights": that "the ionosphere remains dense between the E and F2 regions, with only minor valleys in the electron-density profiles."					
30 June	(Soviet Union) R-1		(Soviet Union) Kapustin Yar		(Soviet Union) OKB-1	
30 June		OKB-1	Suborbital	Missile test	30 June	Successful

=== July ===
July launches
Date and time (UTC)	Rocket	Flight number	Launch site		LSP	
Date and time (UTC)	Payload	Operator	Orbit	Function	Decay (UTC)	Outcome
Date and time (UTC)	Remarks					
5 July; 07:52	(United States) Aerobee RTV-N-10c	NRL 33	(United States) White Sands LC-35		(United States) US Navy	
5 July; 07:52		NRL	Suborbital	Airglow / Aeronomy	5 July	Successful
5 July; 07:52	Apogee: 162 kilometres (101 mi)					
6 July; 18:00	(United States) Nike-Cajun	AM6.01	(United States) Wallops Island		(United States) NACA	
6 July; 18:00		NACA / University of Michigan	Suborbital	Aeronomy	6 July	Successful
6 July; 18:00	Apogee: 129 kilometres (80 mi), maiden flight of the Nike-Cajun					
12 July	(Soviet Union) R-2		(Soviet Union) Kapustin Yar		(Soviet Union) OKB-1	
12 July		OKB-1	Suborbital	Missile test	12 July	Successful
17 July	(United States) X-17		(United States) Cape Canaveral LC-3		(United States) US Air Force	
17 July		ARDC	Suborbital	REV test	17 July	Successful
17 July	Apogee: 142 kilometres (88 mi)					
17 July; 15:40	(United States) Deacon Rockoon	NN5.27	(United States) USS Colonial, Pacific Ocean, southwest of San Diego		(United States) US Navy	
17 July; 15:40		NRL	Suborbital	Solar UV / X-ray	17 July	Successful
17 July; 15:40	Apogee: 120 kilometres (75 mi)					
18 July; 15:46	(United States) Deacon Rockoon	NN5.28	(United States) USS Colonial, Pacific Ocean, southwest of San Diego		(United States) US Navy	
18 July; 15:46		NRL	Suborbital	Solar UV / X-ray	18 July	Successful
18 July; 15:46	Apogee: 120 kilometres (75 mi)					
19 July; 15:21	(United States) Deacon Rockoon	NN5.29	(United States) USS Colonial, Pacific Ocean, southwest of San Diego		(United States) US Navy	
19 July; 15:21		NRL	Suborbital	Solar UV / X-ray	19 July	Successful
19 July; 15:21	Apogee: 120 kilometres (75 mi)					
20 July	(Soviet Union) R-1		(Soviet Union) Kapustin Yar		(Soviet Union) OKB-1	
20 July		OKB-1	Suborbital	Missile test	20 July	Launch failure
20 July	(Soviet Union) R-5RD		(Soviet Union) Kapustin Yar		(Soviet Union) OKB-1	
20 July		MVS	Suborbital	R-7 component test	20 July	Successful
20 July; 19:15	(United States) Deacon Rockoon	NN5.30	(United States) USS Colonial, Pacific Ocean, southwest of San Diego		(United States) US Navy	
20 July; 19:15		NRL	Suborbital	Solar UV / X-ray	20 July	Successful
20 July; 19:15	Apogee: 120 kilometres (75 mi)					
21 July; 17:18	(United States) Deacon Rockoon	NN5.31	(United States) USS Colonial, Pacific Ocean, southwest of San Diego		(United States) US Navy	
21 July; 17:18		NRL	Suborbital	Aeronomy	21 July	Launch failure
21 July; 17:18	Apogee: 11 kilometres (6.8 mi)					
22 July; 17:57	(United States) Deacon Rockoon	NN5.32	(United States) USS Colonial, Pacific Ocean, southwest of San Diego		(United States) US Navy	
22 July; 17:57		NRL	Suborbital	Solar UV / X-ray	22 July	Successful
22 July; 17:57	Apogee: 120 kilometres (75 mi)					
24 July	(Soviet Union) R-1		(Soviet Union) Kapustin Yar		(Soviet Union) OKB-1	
24 July		OKB-1	Suborbital	Missile test	24 July	Successful
24 July	(United States) Nike-Cajun		(United States) Wallops Island		(United States) US Navy	
24 July	(United States) HUGO	US Navy	Suborbital	Hurricane Photography / Aeronomy	24 July	Successful
24 July	Apogee: 112 kilometres (70 mi)					
24 July; 14:07	(United States) Deacon Rockoon	NN5.33	(United States) USS Colonial, Pacific Ocean, southwest of San Diego		(United States) US Navy	
24 July; 14:07		NRL	Suborbital	Solar UV / X-ray	24 July	Launch failure
24 July; 14:07	Apogee: 11 kilometres (6.8 mi)					
25 July; 15:15	(United States) Deacon Rockoon	NN5.34	(United States) USS Colonial, Pacific Ocean, southwest of San Diego		(United States) US Navy	
25 July; 15:15		NRL	Suborbital	Solar UV / X-ray	25 July	Successful
25 July; 15:15	Apogee: 120 kilometres (75 mi)					
26 July	(Soviet Union) R-1		(Soviet Union) Kapustin Yar		(Soviet Union) OKB-1	
26 July		OKB-1	Suborbital	Missile test	26 July	Successful
26 July; 15:28	(United States) Deacon Rockoon	NN5.35	(United States) USS Colonial, Pacific Ocean, southwest of San Diego		(United States) US Navy	
26 July; 15:28		NRL	Suborbital	Solar UV / X-ray	26 July	Successful
26 July; 15:28	Apogee: 120 kilometres (75 mi)					
27 July	(United States) X-17		(United States) Cape Canaveral LC-3		(United States) US Air Force	
27 July		ARDC	Suborbital	REV test	27 July	Launch failure
27 July	Apogee: 0 kilometres (0 mi)					
27 July; 15:30	(United States) Deacon Rockoon	NN5.36	(United States) USS Colonial, Pacific Ocean, southwest of San Diego		(United States) US Navy	
27 July; 15:30		NRL	Suborbital	Solar UV / X-ray	27 July	Successful
27 July; 15:30	Apogee: 120 kilometres (75 mi), final flight of the Deacon rockoon					
28 July	(Soviet Union) R-1		(Soviet Union) Kapustin Yar		(Soviet Union) OKB-1	
28 July		OKB-1	Suborbital	Missile test	28 July	Successful
28 July	(Soviet Union) R-2		(Soviet Union) Kapustin Yar		(Soviet Union) OKB-1	
28 July		OKB-1	Suborbital	Missile test	28 July	Successful
28 July	(Soviet Union) R-2		(Soviet Union) Kapustin Yar		(Soviet Union) OKB-1	
28 July		OKB-1	Suborbital	Missile test	28 July	Successful
31 July; 00:56	(United States) Aerobee AJ10-34	USAF 71	(United States) Holloman LC-A		(United States) US Air Force	
31 July; 00:56		AFCRC	Suborbital	Airglow	31 July	Successful
31 July; 00:56	Apogee: 129 kilometres (80 mi)					

=== August ===
August launches
Date and time (UTC)	Rocket	Flight number	Launch site		LSP	
Date and time (UTC)	Payload	Operator	Orbit	Function	Decay (UTC)	Outcome
Date and time (UTC)	Remarks					
3 August; 12:56	(United States) Aerobee RTV-A-1a	USAF 72	(United States) Holloman LC-A		(United States) US Air Force	
3 August; 12:56		AFCRC	Suborbital	Solar UV	3 August	Launch failure
3 August; 12:56	Apogee: 2.4 kilometres (1.5 mi), fail safe cutoff at 4.6 seconds					
7 August	(Soviet Union) R-5RD		(Soviet Union) Kapustin Yar		(Soviet Union) OKB-1	
7 August		MVS	Suborbital	R-7 component test	7 August	Successful
8 August; 22:00	(United States) Nike-Cajun	AM6.30	(United States) White Sands		(United States) US Air Force	
8 August; 22:00		University of Michigan	Suborbital	Aeronomy	8 August	Successful
8 August; 22:00	Apogee: 100 kilometres (62 mi)					
9 August; 15:53	(United States) Aerobee XASR-SC-1	SC 34	(United States) White Sands LC-35		(United States) US Army	
9 August; 15:53		SCEL / University of Michigan	Suborbital	Aeronomy	9 August	Successful
9 August; 15:53	Apogee: 85.5 kilometres (53.1 mi); carried three bottles for sampling air at apogee: two leaked, one recovered and analyzed.					
9 August; 22:47	(United States) Nike-Cajun	OB6.00	(United States) White Sands		(United States) US Air Force	
9 August; 22:47		BRL	Suborbital	Aeronomy	9 August	Successful
9 August; 22:47	Apogee: 164 kilometres (102 mi)					
10 August	(Soviet Union) R-5RD		(Soviet Union) Kapustin Yar		(Soviet Union) OKB-1	
10 August		MVS	Suborbital	R-7 component test	10 August	Successful
10 August; 15:22	(United States) Aerobee XASR-SC-1	SC 35	(United States) White Sands LC-35		(United States) US Army	
10 August; 15:22		SCEL / University of Michigan	Suborbital	Aeronomy	10 August	Successful
10 August; 15:22	Apogee: 85.9 kilometres (53.4 mi), final flight of the Aerobee XASR-SC-1					
18 August	(United States) X-17		(United States) Cape Canaveral LC-3		(United States) US Air Force	
18 August		ARDC	Suborbital	REV test	18 August	Launch failure
18 August	Apogee: 0 kilometres (0 mi)					
23 August	(United States) X-17		(United States) Cape Canaveral LC-3		(United States) US Air Force	
23 August		ARDC / NACA	Suborbital	REV test	23 August	Successful
23 August	Apogee: 142 kilometres (88 mi)					
25 August	(Soviet Union) R-5M		(Soviet Union) Kapustin Yar		(Soviet Union) OKB-1	
25 August		OKB-1	Suborbital	Missile test	25 August	Successful
28 August	(United States) X-17		(United States) Cape Canaveral LC-3		(United States) US Air Force	
28 August		ARDC	Suborbital	REV test	28 August	Successful
28 August	Apogee: 100 kilometres (62 mi)					

=== September ===
September launches
Date and time (UTC)	Rocket	Flight number	Launch site		LSP	
Date and time (UTC)	Payload	Operator	Orbit	Function	Decay (UTC)	Outcome
Date and time (UTC)	Remarks					
8 September	(United States) X-17		(United States) Cape Canaveral LC-3		(United States) US Air Force	
8 September		ARDC	Suborbital	REV test	8 September	Launch failure
8 September	Apogee: 394 kilometres (245 mi)					
16 September	(Soviet Union) R-5M		(Soviet Union) Kapustin Yar		(Soviet Union) OKB-1	
16 September		OKB-1	Suborbital	Missile test	16 September	Successful
19 September	(Soviet Union) R-5M		(Soviet Union) Kapustin Yar		(Soviet Union) OKB-1	
19 September		OKB-1	Suborbital	Missile test	19 September	Successful
20 September; 06:45	(United States) Jupiter-C		(United States) Cape Canaveral LC-5		(United States) ABMA	
20 September; 06:45		ABMA	Suborbital	REV test	20 September	Successful
20 September; 06:45	Apogee: 1,094 kilometres (680 mi), maiden flight of the Jupiter-C, carried a 39.2 kilograms (86 lb) payload in a three-stage configuration					
21 September	(United States) Terrapin		(United States) Wallops Island		(United States) NACA / NSA	
21 September		University of Maryland	Suborbital	Test flight	21 September	Launch failure
21 September	Apogee: 16 kilometres (9.9 mi), maiden flight of the Terrapin					
21 September	(United States) Terrapin		(United States) Wallops Island		(United States) NACA / NSA	
21 September		University of Maryland	Suborbital	Test flight	21 September	Successful
21 September	Apogee: 120 kilometres (75 mi)					
25 September	(Soviet Union) R-5RD		(Soviet Union) Kapustin Yar		(Soviet Union) OKB-1	
25 September		MVS	Suborbital	R-7 component test	25 September	Successful
26 September	(Soviet Union) R-5RD		(Soviet Union) Kapustin Yar		(Soviet Union) OKB-1	
26 September		MVS	Suborbital	R-7 component test	26 September	Successful
26 September	Final flight of the R-5RD					
29 September	(Soviet Union) R-2		(Soviet Union) Kapustin Yar		(Soviet Union) OKB-1	
29 September		OKB-1	Suborbital	Missile test	29 September	Successful

=== October ===
October launches
Date and time (UTC)	Rocket	Flight number	Launch site		LSP	
Date and time (UTC)	Payload	Operator	Orbit	Function	Decay (UTC)	Outcome
Date and time (UTC)	Remarks					
1 October	(United States) X-17		(United States) Cape Canaveral LC-3		(United States) US Air Force	
1 October		ARDC	Suborbital	REV test	1 October	Successful
1 October	Apogee: 145 kilometres (90 mi)					
5 October	(United States) X-17		(United States) Cape Canaveral LC-3		(United States) US Air Force	
5 October		ARDC	Suborbital	REV test	5 October	Successful
5 October	Apogee: 117 kilometres (73 mi)					
11 October	(United States) HJ-Nike		(United States) Wallops Island		(United States) NACA	
11 October		NACA	Suborbital	REV test	11 October	Successful
11 October	Apogee: 70 kilometres (43 mi)					
13 October	(United States) X-17		(United States) Cape Canaveral LC-3		(United States) US Air Force	
13 October		ARDC	Suborbital	REV test	13 October	Successful
13 October	Apogee: 102 kilometres (63 mi)					
18 October	(United States) X-17		(United States) Cape Canaveral LC-3		(United States) US Air Force	
18 October		ARDC	Suborbital	REV test	18 October	Successful
18 October	Apogee: 155 kilometres (96 mi)					
20 October; 22:01	(United States) Nike-Cajun	AM6.31	(Canada) Churchill		(United States) US Air Force	
20 October; 22:01		University of Michigan	Suborbital	Aeronomy	20 October	Successful
20 October; 22:01	Apogee: 113 kilometres (70 mi), first spaceflight launched from Canadian soil					
23 October; 08:40	(United States) Aerobee AJ10-34	AM2.21	(Canada) Churchill		(United States) US Army	
23 October; 08:40		SCEL / University of Michigan	Suborbital	Aeronomy	23 October	Successful
23 October; 08:40	Apogee: 145 kilometres (90 mi)					
24 October	(Soviet Union) R-1		(Soviet Union) Kapustin Yar		(Soviet Union) OKB-1	
24 October		OKB-1	Suborbital	Missile test	24 October	Successful
25 October	(Soviet Union) R-1		(Soviet Union) Kapustin Yar		(Soviet Union) OKB-1	
25 October		OKB-1	Suborbital	Missile test	25 October	Successful
25 October	(Soviet Union) R-2		(Soviet Union) Kapustin Yar		(Soviet Union) OKB-1	
25 October		OKB-1	Suborbital	Missile test	25 October	Successful
25 October	(Soviet Union) R-2		(Soviet Union) Kapustin Yar		(Soviet Union) OKB-1	
25 October		OKB-1	Suborbital	Missile test	25 October	Successful
26 October	(Soviet Union) R-1		(Soviet Union) Kapustin Yar		(Soviet Union) OKB-1	
26 October		OKB-1	Suborbital	Missile test	26 October	Successful
25 October	(United States) X-17		(United States) Cape Canaveral LC-3		(United States) US Air Force	
25 October		ARDC	Suborbital	REV test	25 October	Successful
25 October	Apogee: 124 kilometres (77 mi)					
27 October; 21:24	(United States) Nike-Cajun	AM6.08	(United States) USS Rushmore, Atlantic Ocean, near New York City		(United States) US Air Force / US Navy	
27 October; 21:24		University of Michigan	Suborbital	Aeronomy	27 October	Successful
27 October; 21:24	Apogee: 161 kilometres (100 mi)					

=== November ===
November launches
Date and time (UTC)	Rocket	Flight number	Launch site		LSP	
Date and time (UTC)	Payload	Operator	Orbit	Function	Decay (UTC)	Outcome
Date and time (UTC)	Remarks					
1 November; 12:57	(United States) Aerobee AJ10-34	USAF 73	(United States) Holloman LC-A		(United States) US Air Force	
1 November; 12:57		AFCRC	Suborbital	Aeronomy	1 November	Successful
1 November; 12:57	Apogee: 66 kilometres (41 mi)					
2 November; 05:39	(United States) Aerobee AJ10-34	USAF 74	(United States) Holloman LC-A		(United States) US Air Force	
2 November; 05:39	(United States) Sodium Release 4	AFCRC	Suborbital	Aeronomy	2 November	Successful
2 November; 05:39	Apogee: 146 kilometres (91 mi); Three minutes into flight, starting at 60 km (37 mi) and ending at 140 km (87 mi) altitude, 2 kg (4.4 lb) of sodium metal were ejected in vapor form. At 60 km (37 mi), a yellow glow was easily visible, and a dim persistent trail was photographed. Photometric measurements and simultaneous two-site photograph with Super-Schmidt cameras measured the intensity of the emission all along the 80 km (50 mi) of emission.					
2 November; 18:40	(United States) Nike-Cajun	AM6.09	(United States) USS Rushmore, Atlantic Ocean, east of Newfoundland		(United States) US Air Force / US Navy	
2 November; 18:40		University of Michigan	Suborbital	Aeronomy	2 November	Successful
2 November; 18:40	Apogee: 131 kilometres (81 mi)					
3 November	(Soviet Union) R-2		(Soviet Union) Kapustin Yar		(Soviet Union) OKB-1	
3 November		OKB-1	Suborbital	Missile test	3 November	Successful
3 November	(Soviet Union) R-5M		(Soviet Union) Kapustin Yar		(Soviet Union) OKB-1	
3 November		OKB-1	Suborbital	Missile test	3 November	Successful
4 November; 18:54	(United States) Nike-Cajun	AM6.10	(United States) USS Rushmore, Labrador Sea		(United States) US Air Force / US Navy	
4 November; 18:54		University of Michigan	Suborbital	Aeronomy	4 November	Successful
4 November; 18:54	Apogee: 162 kilometres (101 mi)					
5 November	(United States) X-17		(United States) Cape Canaveral LC-3		(United States) US Air Force	
5 November		ARDC	Suborbital	REV test	5 November	Successful
5 November	Apogee: 118 kilometres (73 mi)					
5 November; 07:50	(United States) Aerobee Hi	NRL 45	(Canada) Churchill		(United States) US Navy	
5 November; 07:50		NRL	Suborbital	Auroral	5 November	Unknown
5 November; 07:50	Navy variant designation: RV-N-13b; Altitude not reported, possible failure					
7 November; 15:02	(United States) Nike-Cajun	AM6.11	(United States) USS Rushmore, Davis Strait		(United States) US Air Force / US Navy	
7 November; 15:02		University of Michigan	Suborbital	Aeronomy	7 November	Successful
7 November; 15:02	Apogee: 169 kilometres (105 mi)					
10 November; 15:17	(United States) Nike-Cajun	AM6.12	(United States) USS Rushmore, Davis Strait		(United States) US Air Force / US Navy	
10 November; 15:17		University of Michigan	Suborbital	Aeronomy	10 November	Successful
10 November; 15:17	Apogee: 161 kilometres (100 mi)					
12 November	(Soviet Union) R-1		(Soviet Union) Kapustin Yar		(Soviet Union) OKB-1	
12 November		OKB-1	Suborbital	Missile test	12 November	Successful
12 November; 11:47	(United States) Aerobee RTV-A-1a	SM1.01	(Canada) Churchill		(United States) US Army	
12 November; 11:47	(United States) Grenades	SCEL / University of Michigan	Suborbital	Aeronomy	12 November	Successful
12 November; 11:47	Apogee: 67 kilometres (42 mi)					
13 November	(Soviet Union) R-5M		(Soviet Union) Kapustin Yar		(Soviet Union) OKB-1	
13 November		OKB-1	Suborbital	Missile test	13 November	Successful
15 November; 19:32	(United States) Aerobee Hi	NRL 47	(Canada) Churchill		(United States) US Navy	
15 November; 19:32		NRL	Suborbital	Ionospheric	15 November	Successful
15 November; 19:32	Apogee: 129 kilometres (80 mi), Navy variant designation: RV-N-13b					
16 November	(Soviet Union) R-5M		(Soviet Union) Kapustin Yar		(Soviet Union) OKB-1	
16 November		OKB-1	Suborbital	Missile test	16 November	Successful
16 November	(United States) X-17		(United States) Cape Canaveral LC-3		(United States) US Air Force	
16 November		ARDC	Suborbital	REV test	16 November	Successful
16 November	Apogee: 107 kilometres (66 mi)					
17 November; 16:48	(United States) Aerobee Hi	NRL 43	(Canada) Churchill		(United States) US Navy	
17 November; 16:48		NRL	Suborbital	Aeronomy / Solar UV / Solar X-Ray	17 November	Successful
17 November; 16:48	Apogee: 209 kilometres (130 mi), Navy variant designation: RV-N-13b					
21 November; 05:21	(United States) Aerobee Hi	NRL 48	(Canada) Churchill		(United States) US Navy	
21 November; 05:21		NRL	Suborbital	Ionospheric / Auroral	21 November	Successful
21 November; 05:21	Apogee: 251 kilometres (156 mi), Navy variant designation: RV-N-13c; equipped with a Bennett radio-frequency ion-mass spectrometer, launched "at night, into an overcast which prevented observations of the overhead sky", succeeded by flights carrying identical instruments in February and March 1958.					
23 November	(United States) X-17		(United States) Cape Canaveral LC-3		(United States) US Air Force	
23 November		ARDC	Suborbital	REV test	23 November	Successful
23 November	Apogee: 143 kilometres (89 mi)					
24 November	(Soviet Union) R-5M		(Soviet Union) Kapustin Yar		(Soviet Union) OKB-1	
24 November		OKB-1	Suborbital	ABM target	24 November	Successful
24 November	First R-5 to launch as an anti-ballistic missile target for the V-1000 system					

=== December ===
December launches
Date and time (UTC)	Rocket	Flight number	Launch site		LSP	
Date and time (UTC)	Payload	Operator	Orbit	Function	Decay (UTC)	Outcome
Date and time (UTC)	Remarks					
3 December	(United States) X-17		(United States) Cape Canaveral LC-3		(United States) US Air Force	
3 December		ARDC	Suborbital	REV test	3 December	Successful
3 December	Apogee: 125 kilometres (78 mi)					
6 December	(Soviet Union) R-1		(Soviet Union) Kapustin Yar		(Soviet Union) OKB-1	
6 December		OKB-1	Suborbital	Missile test	6 December	Successful
6 December	(Soviet Union) R-5M		(Soviet Union) Kapustin Yar		(Soviet Union) OKB-1	
6 December		OKB-1	Suborbital	Missile test	6 December	Successful
7 December	(United States) Nike-Cajun		(United States) Wallops Island		(United States) NACA	
7 December		NACA	Suborbital	REV test	7 December	Successful
7 December	Apogee: 30 kilometres (19 mi)					
8 December; 06:03	(United States) Viking (second model)		(United States) Cape Canaveral LC-18A		(United States) US Navy	
8 December; 06:03	(United States) Vanguard TV-0	NRL	Suborbital	Test flight	8 December	Successful
8 December; 06:03	Apogee: 203.6 kilometres (126.5 mi), first Project Vanguard test flight using a single-stage Viking (No. 13)					
11 December	(United States) X-17		(United States) Cape Canaveral LC-3		(United States) US Air Force	
11 December		ARDC	Suborbital	REV test	11 December	Successful
11 December	Apogee: 144 kilometres (89 mi)					
12 December	(Soviet Union) R-5M		(Soviet Union) Kapustin Yar		(Soviet Union) OKB-1	
12 December		OKB-1	Suborbital	ABM target	12 December	Successful
13 December; 21:44	(United States) Aerobee Hi	USAF 75	(United States) Holloman LC-A		(United States) US Air Force	
13 December; 21:44		AFCRC	Suborbital	Test flight	13 December	Successful
13 December; 21:44	Apogee: 193 kilometres (120 mi)					
20 December	(Soviet Union) A-1		(Soviet Union) Kapustin Yar		(Soviet Union) OKB-1	
20 December		MVS	Suborbital	Ionospheric	20 December	Successful

- ← Jan
- Feb
- Mar
- Apr
- May
- Jun
- Jul
- Aug
- Sep
- Oct
- Nov
- Dec →

== Suborbital launch statistics ==
=== By country ===
Launches by country
Country	Launches	Successes	Failures	Partial failures	Unknown
Soviet Union	69	67	2	0	1
United States	76	63	12	0	1
World	145	130	14	0	2

=== By rocket ===
- Viking (second model)
- Aerobee RTV-N-10
- Aerobee RTV-N-10c
- Aerobee Hi (NRL)
- Aerobee XASR-SC-1
- Aerobee RTV-A-1a
- Aerobee Hi (USAF)
- Aerobee AJ10-34
- Deacon rockoon (NRL)
- Nike-Nike-T40-T55
- Nike-Cajun
- Terrapin
- X-17
- HJ-Nike
- Jupiter-C
- R-1
- A-1
- R-1E
- R-1UK
- R-2
- R-5M
- R-5RD
- R-5R

Launches by rocket
Rocket	Country	Launches	Successes	Failures	Partial failures	Unknown	Remarks
Viking (second model)	United States	1	1	0	0	0	
Aerobee RTV-N-10	United States	1	0	1	0	0	
Aerobee RTV-N-10c	United States	1	1	0	0	0	
Aerobee Hi (NRL)	United States	8	4	3	0	1	
Aerobee XASR-SC-1	United States	2	2	0	0	0	Retired
Aerobee RTV-A-1a	United States	5	4	1	0	0	
Aerobee Hi (USAF)	United States	2	1	1	0	0	
Aerobee AJ10-34	United States	9	9	0	0	0	Maiden flight
Deacon rockoon (NRL)	United States	10	8	2	0	0	Retired
Nike-Nike-T40-T55	United States	1	1	0	0	0	Retired
Nike-Cajun	United States	11	11	0	0	0	Maiden flight
Terrapin	United States	2	1	1	0	0	Maiden flight
X-17	United States	20	17	3	0	0	
HJ-Nike	United States	2	2	0	0	0	
Jupiter-C	United States	1	1	0	0	0	Maiden flight
R-1	Soviet Union	17	15	2	0	0	
A-1	Soviet Union	1	1	0	0	0	
R-1E	Soviet Union	4	3	0	0	1	Retired
R-1UK	Soviet Union	10	10	0	0	0	Maiden flight, retired
R-2	Soviet Union	11	11	0	0	0	
R-5M	Soviet Union	14	14	0	0	0	
R-5RD	Soviet Union	10	10	0	0	0	Maiden flight, retired
R-5R	Soviet Union	3	3	0	0	0	Maiden flight, retired

== See also ==
- Timeline of spaceflight
