= Long Tom (rocket) =

Long Tom rocket on display in Woomera, South Australia

Long Tom was the first Australian sounding rocket. It was first launched from the Woomera Test Range in October 1957. It was a 8.2-metre-long (27 ft) two-stage rocket developed to test the range's instrumentation for later projects. In the early 1960s it was superseded by the HAD and HAT sounding rockets.

== See also ==
- Australian Space Research Institute
