= Nike-Asp =

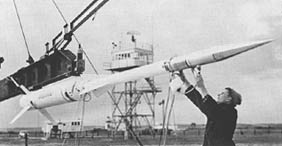
- A Nike-Asp undergoes a preflight check at Wallops Flight Facility
- Function: Sounding rocket
- Country of origin: United States

Size
- Height: 7.9 m (26 ft)
- Diameter: 0.42 m (1 ft 5 in)
- Mass: 700 kg (1,500 lb)
- Stages: Two

Payload to 260 km (160 mi)
- Mass: 27 kg (60 lb)

Launch history
- Status: Retired
- Launch sites: Multiple
- Total launches: 77
- First flight: 26 September 1957
- Last flight: 18 February 1963

First stage – Nike
- Diameter: 0.42 m (1 ft 5 in)
- Powered by: 1 x ABL M5
- Maximum thrust: 217 kN (49,000 lb_{f})
- Burn time: 3.5 s
- Propellant: solid

Second stage – Asp IV
- Diameter: 0.17 m (6.7 in)
- Powered by: 1 x RM-1400
- Maximum thrust: 12.7 kN (2,900 lb_{f})
- Burn time: 12 s
- Propellant: solid

Nike Asp was an American sounding rocket. The Nike Asp has a ceiling of 220 km, a takeoff thrust of 217 kN, a takeoff weight of 700 kg, a diameter of 0.42 m and a length of 7.90 m.

The Nike-Asp is an Asp rocket (Asp IV RM-1400) with a Nike booster system. It was at times ship-launched. After NASA took control of the project, the rocket fell into disuse.

== USS Point Defiance (LSD-31) ==
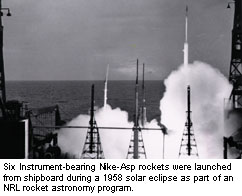
Shipboard launch of Nike-Asps during the October 12, 1968, solar eclipse.

USS Point Defiance (LSD-31) became one of the first rocket-launching surface ships to support the 1958 IGY Solar Eclipse Expedition to the Danger Island region of the South Pacific.

Launchers on deck fired eight Nike-Asp model LV sounding rockets to collect scientific data during the eclipse. Each USN solar XUV and X-ray detection launch (5 as a salvo) was from 40.0° N 150.0° W on Oct 12 1958 - at 08:32, 08:42, 08:43, 08:52, and 09:10 GMT, with configuration designations: NN8.59F - NN8.62F and successive apogee achievements of 222, 236, 242, 240, and 88 km.

== Vandenberg Air Force Base ==
Between Jul 14 and Aug 31 1959, five Nike-Asps were launched as part of the solar X-ray mission by the US Navy. The last launch on Aug 31 1959 at 22:53 GMT carried the Sunflare II solar X-ray detection system to an apogee of 200 km.

== Eglin Air Force Base ==
In an unsuccessful effort to measure lunar X-ray emission, the USAF launched the last Nike-Asp on Sep 27 1960 at 22:10 GMT to an apogee of 233 km.
