= Lockheed X-17 =

Experimental solid-fuel research rocket

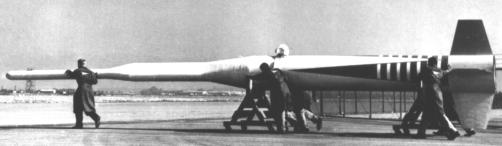
- Type: Atmospheric reentry testing

Production history
- Manufacturer: Lockheed Corporation

Specifications
- Length: 40 ft 4 in (12.29 m)
- Diameter: 1st stage: 2 ft 7 in (0.79 m); 2nd stage: 1 ft 5 in (0.43 m); 3rd stage: 0 ft 9.7 in (0.246 m)
- Wingspan: 7 ft 7 in (2.31 m)
- Engine: 1st stage:1× Thiokol XM20 Sergeant solid-fuel rocket, 48,000 lbf (210 kN); 2nd stage: 3× Thiokol XM19 Recruit solid-fuel rocket, 33,900 lbf (151 kN) (each); 3rd stage: 1× Thiokol XM19E1 Recruit solid-fuel rocket, 35,950 lbf (159.9 kN)
- Operational range: 135 miles (217 km)
- Flight altitude: 250 mi (400 km)
- Maximum speed: Mach 14.5

The Lockheed X-17 was a three-stage solid-fuel research rocket to test the effects of high mach atmospheric reentry. The first stage of the X-17 carried the rocket to a height of 17 miles (27 km) before burning out. The rocket would then coast on momentum to about 100 miles (160 km) before nosing down for reentry. The second stage engine would then fire before jettisoning and igniting the third and final stage. On April 24, 1957, an X-17 reached a speed of 9,000 miles per hour (14,000 km/h) at Patrick AFB. Ultimately the X-17 would be traveling towards Earth at up to Mach 14.5.

The X-17 was also used as the booster for the Operation Argus series of three high-altitude nuclear tests conducted in the South Atlantic in 1958.

The rocket engine used by the rocket is called 1.5KS35000, a solid propellant rocket engine designed by Thiokol. It was used in at least 23 launches.

== Polaris FTV program ==
The X-17 was used as a test vehicle to test technology for the development of the UGM-27 Polaris missile in 1957–1958. During this testing, the rocket was called the Polaris Flight Test Vehicle, or Polaris FTV. The Polaris FTV-3 was a standard configuration X-17. The Polaris FTV-5 was a two-stage configuration using the same first stage, a Sergeant rocket, with a different second stage.
