= 1954 in spaceflight =

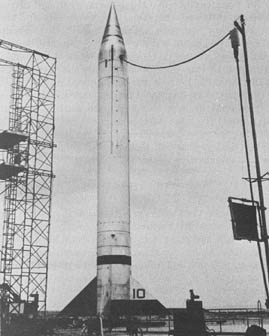
- Viking 10 was launched in May

National firsts
- Spaceflight: France

Rockets
- Maiden flights: (United States) Aerobee RTV-N-10b (United States) Nike-Nike-T40-T55 (Soviet Union) A-1 (Soviet Union) R-1D (France) Véronique-NA
- Retirements: (United States) Aerobee RTV-N-10b (Soviet Union) R-1D (France) Véronique-NA

1954 in spaceflight

The year 1954 saw the conception of Project Orbiter, the first practicable satellite launching project, utilizing the Redstone, a newly developed Short Range Ballistic Missile.

A variety of sounding rockets continued to return scientific data from beyond the 100 kilometres (62 mi) boundary of space (as defined by the World Air Sports Federation), including the Viking and Aerobee rockets, University of Iowa and Naval Research Laboratory ship-launched rockoons, and derivatives of the Soviet R-1 missile. The French also launched their first sounding rocket into space, the Véronique-NA.

1954 also marked a year of development of the Intercontinental Ballistic Missile (ICBM). The United States prioritized the development of its Atlas while the Soviet Union authorized the draft proposal for the R-7 Semyorka, its first ICBM.

== Space exploration highlights ==
=== US Navy ===
After ten months of salvage, testing, and troubleshooting following the failed launch of Viking 10 on 30 June 1953, a successful static firing of the rebuilt rocket took place at the end of April 1954. Launch was scheduled for 4 May. Control issues revealed in the static firing as well as gusty, sand-laden winds caused a delay of three days. At 10:00 AM local time, Viking 10 blasted off from its pad at the White Sands Missile Range in New Mexico, reaching an altitude of 136 mi (219 km)—a tie with the highest altitude ever reached by a first-generation Viking (Viking 7 on 7 August 1951). Data was received from the rocket for all stages of the flight, and its scientific package returned the first measurement of positive ion composition at high altitudes.

Viking 11, which was ready for erection on 5 May, also had a successful static test and was ready for launch, 24 May 1954. Again, the countdown went without hold, and Viking 11, the heaviest rocket yet in the series, was launched at 10:00 AM. Forty seconds into the flight, several puffs of smoke issued from the vehicle, but these accidental excitations of the rocket's roll jets did no harm. Viking 11 ultimately reached 158 mi (254 km) in altitude, a record for the series, snapping the highest altitude photographs of the Earth to date. Both Vikings 10 and 11 carried successful emulsions experiments, measuring cosmic rays at high altitudes.

Three more Viking flights were scheduled, one of which would fly in 1955, the other two later incorporated into the subsequent Project Vanguard.

=== American civilian efforts ===
For the third summer in a row, members of the State University of Iowa (SUI) physics department embarked 15 July 1954 on an Atlantic expedition to launch a series of balloon-launched Deacon rockets (rockoons), this time aboard the icebreaker, USS Atka. Once again, a Naval Research Laboratory team accompanied them to launch their own rockoons. Beginning with the fourth SUI launch on 21 July 1954 off the northern tip of Labrador, eleven rockoon launches (seven of them successful) over a five-day period probed the heart of the auroral zone at high altitude. Each rockoon carried two geiger counters with different thicknesses of shielding; two of the flights determined that aurorae produced detectable "soft" (lower energy/penetrative) radiation.

=== Scientific results ===
By 1954, the array of Viking, Aerobee, V-2, Deacon Rockoon, and other high altitude sounding rocket flights had returned a bonanza of knowledge about the upper atmosphere. Previously, it had been believed that, at altitudes above 20 mi (32 km), Earth's atmosphere was highly stratified and peaceful, an indefinite continuation of the stratosphere. Rocket research discovered winds, turbulence, and mixing up to heights of 80 mi (130 km), and wind velocities of 180 mph (290 km/h) were measured 125 mi (201 km) above the Earth's surface. The density of the upper atmosphere was found to be thinner than expected: the estimated average distance an air atom or molecule must travel before colliding with another (mean free path) was refined to .5 mi (0.80 km). Ionized particles were discovered in what were previously thought to be distinct gaps between the E and F layers in the ionosphere.

Sounding rockets returned the first measurements of extraterrestrial X-rays, blocked from observation from the ground by the lower layers of the atmosphere. It was determined that these X-rays were one of the major producers of atmospheric ionization. Ultraviolet radiation was extensively observed as well as its contribution to the ozone layer. Solar radiation data determined that the Sun was hotter than had been calculated from strictly earthbound measurements. Cosmic rays were found to consist mainly of protons, alpha particles, and heavier atomic nuclei; the range of measured elements extended to iron, with greater abundance in even mass numbered elements.

== Vehicle development ==
=== US Air Force ===
On February 1, 1954, the Strategic Missiles Evaluation Committee or 'Teapot Committee', comprising eleven of the top scientists and engineers in the country, issued a report recommending prioritization of the development of the Atlas, the nation's first ICBM. Trevor Gardner, special assistant for research and development to Secretary of the Air Force, Harold Talbott, selected Ramo Wooldridge (R-W) to handle the systems engineering and technical direction for the entire project, a considerable expansion of duties for the year-old company, which had hitherto been contracted by the Air Force to advise and perform research. From spring 1954 through the end of the year, R-W's work was confined to the evaluation of the project and the accumulation of personnel to handle development of the ICBM. Convair, which had been developing the Atlas for the prior eight years, remained the manufacturer of the missile proper.

The public first became aware of the Atlas project with the publication of the 8 March 1954 issue of Aviation Weekly, in which appeared the short item: "Convair is developing a long range ballistic missile known as the Atlas. Its development was begun in the era when Floyd Odlum's Atlas Corp. was the controlling stockholder in Convair."

Before the Teapot commission had determined the likely weight of a thermonuclear payload, the Atlas specification had called for a missile 90 ft (27 m) long and 10 ft (3.0 m) wide, carrying five rocket engines, and a full-scale wooden model as well as a metal test example of the tank were built in 1954. By the time the design was frozen at the end of the year, the specifications had been downscaled to 75 ft (23 m) long, retaining the same width, and the number of engines was reduced to three.

=== Project Orbiter ===
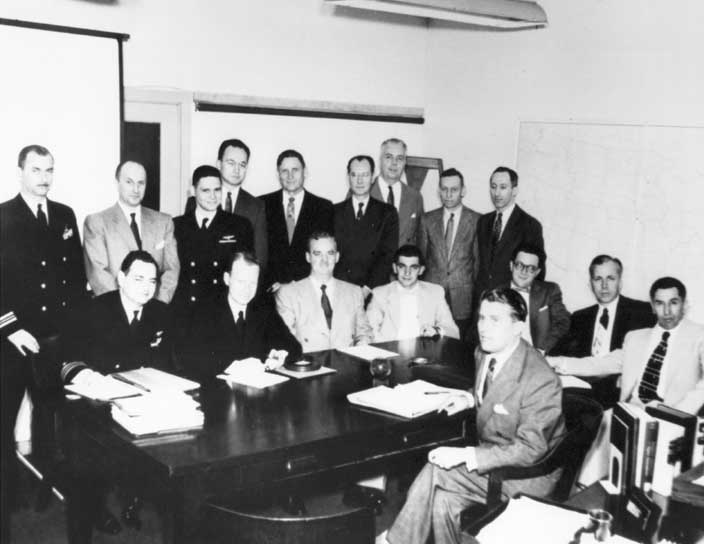
At a meeting of Project Orbiter on March 16, 1954, Fred C. Durant is seen seated at the table, second from the left.

By 1954, there was growing consensus in the United States that rocket technology had evolved to the point the launch of an Earth orbiting satellite was becoming feasible. A 16 March meeting in Washington D.C. involving several of the nation's leading space specialists was arranged by past president of the American Rocket Society Frederick C. Durant III. They included Fred Singer, proposer of the "MOUSE" (Minimum Orbiting Unmanned Satellite of the Earth), rocket scientist Wernher von Braun, David Young of the Army Ballistic Missile Agency, Commander George Hoover and Alexander Satin of the Air Branch of the Office of Naval Research (ONR), and noted astronomer, Fred Whipple. They determined that a slightly modified Redstone (a 200 miles (320 km) range surface-to-surface missile developed the prior year) combined with upper stages employing 31 Loki solid-propellant rockets could put a 5 lb (2.3 kg) satellite into orbit, which could be tracked optically.

Whipple approached the National Science Foundation (NSF) to sponsor a conference for further study of the idea, particularly to develop instrumentation for a satellite. The NSF took no immediate action. Hoover, however, was able to secure interest from the ONR, and by November 1954, a satellite-launching plan had been developed. Dubbed Project Orbiter, the "no-cost satellite" would be built largely from existing hardware; the Army would design and construct the booster system (using Redstone and Loki) while the Navy would handle creation of the satellite, tracking facilities, and the acquisition and analysis of data. By the end of the year, ONR had let $60,000 in three contracts for feasibility studies and initial design.

=== Soviet Union ===
The R-5 missile, able to carry the same 1,000 kilograms (2,200 lb) payload as the R-1 and R-2 but over a distance of 1,200 kilometres (750 mi) underwent its third series of test launches, beginning 12 August 1954 and continuing through 7 February 1955. These tests confirmed the soundness of the design and cleared the way for nuclear and sounding rocket variants.

Paralleling developments in the United States, 1954 marked the authorization of the R-7 Semyorka ICBM (on 20 May). Mikhail Tikhonravov, whose team at had completed the ICBM studies that formed the conceptual framework for the R-7, on 27 May, at the urging of OKB-1 Chief Designer Sergei Korolev, submitted a memorandum entitled, "A Report on an Artificial Satellite of the Earth" to Deputy Minister of Medium Machine Building Vasiliy Rabikov and Georgiy Pashkov, Rabikov's department chief in charge of missiles. This memorandum, containing summaries of both Soviet research of recent years as well as translations of Western articles on satellites, served as the catalyst for the Soviet satellite program.

== Launches ==
- ← Jan
- Feb
- Mar
- Apr
- May
- Jun
- Jul
- Aug
- Sep
- Oct
- Nov
- Dec →

=== February ===
February launches
Date and time (UTC)	Rocket	Flight number	Launch site		LSP	
Date and time (UTC)	Payload	Operator	Orbit	Function	Decay (UTC)	Outcome
Date and time (UTC)	Remarks					
2 February; 18:35	(United States) Aerobee RTV-N-10	NRL 20	(United States) White Sands LC-35		(United States) US Navy	
2 February; 18:35		NRL	Suborbital	Solar UV	2 February	Successful
2 February; 18:35	Apogee: 101 kilometres (63 mi)					
20 February	(France) Véronique-NA		(France) Hammaguir Bechar		(France) LRBA	
20 February		LRBA	Suborbital	Test flight	20 February	Launch failure
20 February	Apogee: 29 kilometres (18 mi), maiden flight of the Véronique-NA					
21 February	(France) Véronique-NA		(France) Hammaguir Bechar		(France) LRBA	
21 February		LRBA	Suborbital	Test flight	21 February	Successful
21 February	Apogee: 135 kilometres (84 mi), first French spaceflight					

=== March ===
March launches
Date and time (UTC)	Rocket	Flight number	Launch site		LSP	
Date and time (UTC)	Payload	Operator	Orbit	Function	Decay (UTC)	Outcome
Date and time (UTC)	Remarks					
11 March	(Soviet Union) R-1		(Soviet Union) Kapustin Yar		(Soviet Union) OKB-1	
11 March		OKB-1	Suborbital	Missile test	11 March	Successful
16 March	(Soviet Union) R-1		(Soviet Union) Kapustin Yar		(Soviet Union) OKB-1	
16 March		OKB-1	Suborbital	Missile test	16 March	Successful
16 March	(Soviet Union) R-1		(Soviet Union) Kapustin Yar		(Soviet Union) OKB-1	
16 March		OKB-1	Suborbital	Missile test	16 March	Successful
20 March	(Soviet Union) R-1		(Soviet Union) Kapustin Yar		(Soviet Union) OKB-1	
20 March		OKB-1	Suborbital	Missile test	20 March	Successful

=== April ===
April launches
Date and time (UTC)	Rocket	Flight number	Launch site		LSP	
Date and time (UTC)	Payload	Operator	Orbit	Function	Decay (UTC)	Outcome
Date and time (UTC)	Remarks					
9 April; 21:12	(United States) Aerobee RTV-N-10	NRL 18	(United States) White Sands LC-35		(United States) US Navy	
9 April; 21:12		NRL	Suborbital	Spectrometry	9 April	Successful
9 April; 21:12	Apogee: 143 kilometres (89 mi)					
10 April; 09:00	(United States) Aerobee RTV-N-10	NRL 19	(United States) White Sands LC-35		(United States) US Navy	
10 April; 09:00		NRL	Suborbital	Spectrometry	10 April	Launch Failure
10 April; 09:00	Apogee: 5 kilometres (3.1 mi)					
23 April	(Soviet Union) R-1		(Soviet Union) Kapustin Yar		(Soviet Union) OKB-1	
23 April		OKB-1	Suborbital	Missile test	23 April	Successful
24 April	(Soviet Union) R-1		(Soviet Union) Kapustin Yar		(Soviet Union) OKB-1	
24 April		OKB-1	Suborbital	Missile test	24 April	Successful
26 April	(Soviet Union) R-1		(Soviet Union) Kapustin Yar		(Soviet Union) OKB-1	
26 April		OKB-1	Suborbital	Missile test	26 April	Successful
29 April	(Soviet Union) R-1		(Soviet Union) Kapustin Yar		(Soviet Union) OKB-1	
29 April		OKB-1	Suborbital	Missile test	29 April	Successful

=== May ===
May launches
Date and time (UTC)	Rocket	Flight number	Launch site		LSP	
Date and time (UTC)	Payload	Operator	Orbit	Function	Decay (UTC)	Outcome
Date and time (UTC)	Remarks					
May	(Soviet Union) R-2		(Soviet Union) Kapustin Yar		(Soviet Union) OKB-1	
May		OKB-1	Suborbital	Missile test	Same Day	
May	First of ten production missile test launches, eight of which were successful					
May	(Soviet Union) R-2		(Soviet Union) Kapustin Yar		(Soviet Union) OKB-1	
May		OKB-1	Suborbital	Missile test	Same Day	
May	Second of ten production missile test launches, eight of which were successful					
May	(Soviet Union) R-2		(Soviet Union) Kapustin Yar		(Soviet Union) OKB-1	
May		OKB-1	Suborbital	Missile test	Same Day	
May	Third of ten production missile test launches, eight of which were successful					
May	(Soviet Union) R-2		(Soviet Union) Kapustin Yar		(Soviet Union) OKB-1	
May		OKB-1	Suborbital	Missile test	Same Day	
May	Fourth of ten production missile test launches, eight of which were successful					
May	(Soviet Union) R-2		(Soviet Union) Kapustin Yar		(Soviet Union) OKB-1	
May		OKB-1	Suborbital	Missile test	Same Day	
May	Fifth of ten production missile test launches, eight of which were successful					
May	(Soviet Union) R-2		(Soviet Union) Kapustin Yar		(Soviet Union) OKB-1	
May		OKB-1	Suborbital	Missile test	Same Day	
May	Sixth of ten production missile test launches, eight of which were successful					
May	(Soviet Union) R-2		(Soviet Union) Kapustin Yar		(Soviet Union) OKB-1	
May		OKB-1	Suborbital	Missile test	Same Day	
May	Seventh of ten production missile test launches, eight of which were successful					
May	(Soviet Union) R-2		(Soviet Union) Kapustin Yar		(Soviet Union) OKB-1	
May		OKB-1	Suborbital	Missile test	Same Day	
May	Eighth of ten production missile test launches, eight of which were successful					
May	(Soviet Union) R-2		(Soviet Union) Kapustin Yar		(Soviet Union) OKB-1	
May		OKB-1	Suborbital	Missile test	Same Day	
May	Ninth of ten production missile test launches, eight of which were successful					
May	(Soviet Union) R-2		(Soviet Union) Kapustin Yar		(Soviet Union) OKB-1	
May		OKB-1	Suborbital	Missile test	Same Day	
May	Tenth of ten production missile test launches, eight of which were successful					
3 May	(Soviet Union) R-1		(Soviet Union) Kapustin Yar		(Soviet Union) OKB-1	
3 May		OKB-1	Suborbital	Missile test	3 May	Successful
4 May	(Soviet Union) R-1		(Soviet Union) Kapustin Yar		(Soviet Union) OKB-1	
4 May		OKB-1	Suborbital	Missile test	4 May	Successful
4 May	(Soviet Union) R-1		(Soviet Union) Kapustin Yar		(Soviet Union) OKB-1	
4 May		OKB-1	Suborbital	Missile test	4 May	Successful
7 May	(Soviet Union) R-1		(Soviet Union) Kapustin Yar		(Soviet Union) OKB-1	
7 May		OKB-1	Suborbital	Missile test	7 May	Successful
7 May; 17:00	(United States) Viking (second model)		(United States) White Sands LC-33		(United States) US Navy	
7 May; 17:00	(United States) Viking 10	NRL	Suborbital	Ionospheric / Aeronomy	7 May	Successful
7 May; 17:00	Apogee: 219 kilometres (136 mi)					
11 May; 15:00	(United States) Aerobee RTV-A-1a	USAF 46	(United States) Holloman LC-A		(United States) US Air Force	
11 May; 15:00		AFCRC	Suborbital	Beacon test	11 May	Successful
11 May; 15:00	Apogee: 98 kilometres (61 mi)					
21 May	(Soviet Union) R-1		(Soviet Union) Kapustin Yar		(Soviet Union) OKB-1	
21 May		OKB-1	Suborbital	Missile test	21 May	Successful
24 May; 17:00	(United States) Viking (second model)		(United States) White Sands LC-33		(United States) US Navy	
24 May; 17:00	(United States) Viking 11	NRL	Suborbital	REV test / Photography	24 May	Successful
24 May; 17:00	Apogee: 254 kilometres (158 mi)					
26 May; 14:24	(Soviet Union) A-1		(Soviet Union) Kapustin Yar		(Soviet Union) OKB-1	
26 May; 14:24		MVS	Suborbital	Ionospheric	26 May	Successful
26 May; 14:24	Apogee: 106 kilometres (66 mi), maiden flight of the A-1					

=== June ===
June launches
Date and time (UTC)	Rocket	Flight number	Launch site		LSP	
Date and time (UTC)	Payload	Operator	Orbit	Function	Decay (UTC)	Outcome
Date and time (UTC)	Remarks					
2 June; 16:10	(United States) Aerobee RTV-A-1a	USAF 47	(United States) Holloman LC-A		(United States) US Air Force	
2 June; 16:10		AFCRC / University of Colorado	Suborbital	Solar UV	2 June	Successful
2 June; 16:10	Apogee: 93 kilometres (58 mi)					
8 June	(Soviet Union) R-2		(Soviet Union) Kapustin Yar		(Soviet Union) OKB-1	
8 June		OKB-1	Suborbital	Missile test	8 June	Successful
9 June	(Soviet Union) R-2		(Soviet Union) Kapustin Yar		(Soviet Union) OKB-1	
9 June		OKB-1	Suborbital	Missile test	9 June	Successful
11 June	(Soviet Union) R-1		(Soviet Union) Kapustin Yar		(Soviet Union) OKB-1	
11 June		OKB-1	Suborbital	Missile test	11 June	Successful
12 June	(Soviet Union) R-1		(Soviet Union) Kapustin Yar		(Soviet Union) OKB-1	
12 June		OKB-1	Suborbital	Missile test	12 June	Successful
14 June	(Soviet Union) R-1		(Soviet Union) Kapustin Yar		(Soviet Union) OKB-1	
14 June		OKB-1	Suborbital	Missile test	14 June	Successful
26 June; 13:24	(Soviet Union) R-1D		(Soviet Union) Kapustin Yar		(Soviet Union) OKB-1	
26 June; 13:24		OKB-1	Suborbital	Biology / Ionosphere / Aeronomy	26 June	Successful
26 June; 13:24	Apogee: 106 kilometres (66 mi), maiden flight of R-1D					

=== July ===
July launches
Date and time (UTC)	Rocket	Flight number	Launch site		LSP	
Date and time (UTC)	Payload	Operator	Orbit	Function	Decay (UTC)	Outcome
Date and time (UTC)	Remarks					
2 July	(Soviet Union) R-1D		(Soviet Union) Kapustin Yar		(Soviet Union) OKB-1	
2 July		OKB-1	Suborbital	Biology / Ionosphere / Aeronomy	2 July	Successful
2 July	Payload, instruments, left and right animal containers all recovered. Smoke container failed. Carried dogs Lyza and Ryjik.					
7 July	(Soviet Union) R-1D		(Soviet Union) Kapustin Yar		(Soviet Union) OKB-1	
7 July		OKB-1	Suborbital	Biology / Ionosphere / Aeronomy	7 July	Successful
7 July	Final flight of the R-1D					
14 July; 13:55	(United States) Aerobee RTV-A-1a	USAF 48	(United States) Holloman LC-A		(United States) US Air Force	
14 July; 13:55		AFCRC / University of Michigan	Suborbital	Aeronomy	14 July	Successful
14 July; 13:55	Apogee: 92 kilometres (57 mi)					
16 July; 12:13	(United States) Deacon Rockoon	SUI 24	(United States) USS Atka, Atlantic Ocean, 360 kilometres (220 mi) east of Boston		(United States) US Navy	
16 July; 12:13		University of Iowa	Suborbital	Ionospheric / Aeronomy	16 July	Launch failure
16 July; 12:13	Apogee: 11 kilometres (6.8 mi)					
16 July; 21:58	(United States) Deacon Rockoon	SUI 25	(United States) USS Atka, Atlantic Ocean, 360 kilometres (220 mi) east of Boston		(United States) US Navy	
16 July; 21:58		University of Iowa	Suborbital	Ionospheric / Aeronomy	16 July	Launch failure
16 July; 21:58	Apogee: 11 kilometres (6.8 mi)					
19 July; 16:00	(United States) Deacon Rockoon	NRL Rockoon 7	(United States) USS Atka, Labrador Sea		(United States) US Navy	
19 July; 16:00		NRL	Suborbital	Aeronomy	19 July	Successful
19 July; 16:00	Apogee: 88 kilometres (55 mi)					
19 July; 20:30	(United States) Deacon Rockoon	SUI 26	(United States) USS Atka, Labrador Sea		(United States) US Navy	
19 July; 20:30		University of Iowa	Suborbital	Ionospheric / Aeronomy	19 July	Spacecraft failure
19 July; 20:30	Apogee: 43 kilometres (27 mi)					
20 July; 02:55	(United States) Deacon Rockoon	NRL Rockoon 8	(United States) USS Atka, Labrador Sea		(United States) US Navy	
20 July; 02:55		NRL	Suborbital	Ionospheric / Aeronomy	20 July	Successful
20 July; 02:55	Apogee: 90 kilometres (56 mi)					
21 July; 09:03	(United States) Deacon Rockoon	SUI 27	(United States) USS Atka, Labrador Sea		(United States) US Navy	
21 July; 09:03		University of Iowa	Suborbital	Ionospheric / Aeronomy	21 July	Successful
21 July; 09:03	Apogee: 60 kilometres (37 mi); first in series of 11 SUI flights, 7 of which were successful					
21 July; 12:45	(United States) Deacon Rockoon	SUI 28	(United States) USS Atka, Labrador Sea		(United States) US Navy	
21 July; 12:45		University of Iowa	Suborbital	Ionospheric / Aeronomy	21 July	
21 July; 12:45	Apogee: 90 kilometres (56 mi); second in series of 11 SUI flights, 7 of which were successful					
21 July; 20:49	(United States) Deacon Rockoon	SUI 29	(United States) USS Atka, Labrador Sea		(United States) US Navy	
21 July; 20:49		University of Iowa	Suborbital	Ionospheric / Aeronomy	21 July	Launch failure
21 July; 20:49	Apogee: 40 kilometres (25 mi); third in series of 11 SUI flights, 7 of which were successful					
22 July	(Soviet Union) R-2		(Soviet Union) Kapustin Yar		(Soviet Union) OKB-1	
22 July		OKB-1	Suborbital	Missile test	22 July	Successful
23 July; 14:46	(United States) Deacon Rockoon	SUI 30	(United States) USS Atka, Labrador Sea		(United States) US Navy	
23 July; 14:46		University of Iowa	Suborbital	Ionospheric / Aeronomy	23 July	
23 July; 14:46	Apogee: 90 kilometres (56 mi); fourth in series of 11 SUI flights, 7 of which were successful					
23 July; 17:09	(United States) Deacon Rockoon	NRL Rockoon 9	(United States) USS Atka, Labrador Sea		(United States) US Navy	
23 July; 17:09		Naval Research Laboratory	Suborbital	Ionospheric / Aeronomy	23 July	Successful
23 July; 17:09	Apogee: 90 kilometres (56 mi)					
23 July; 17:54	(United States) Deacon Rockoon	SUI 31	(United States) USS Atka, Labrador Sea		(United States) US Navy	
23 July; 17:54		University of Iowa	Suborbital	Ionospheric / Aeronomy	23 July	
23 July; 17:54	Apogee: 90 kilometres (56 mi); fifth in series of 11 SUI flights, 7 of which were successful					
23 July; 19:37	(United States) Deacon Rockoon	SUI 32	(United States) USS Atka, Labrador Sea		(United States) US Navy	
23 July; 19:37		University of Iowa	Suborbital	Ionospheric / Aeronomy	23 July	Launch failure
23 July; 19:37	Apogee: 23 kilometres (14 mi); sixth in series of 11 SUI flights, 7 of which were successful					
24 July; 08:57	(United States) Deacon Rockoon	SUI 33	(United States) USS Atka, Labrador Sea		(United States) US Navy	
24 July; 08:57		University of Iowa	Suborbital	Ionospheric / Aeronomy	24 July	
24 July; 08:57	Apogee: 90 kilometres (56 mi); seventh in series of 11 SUI flights, 7 of which were successful					
24 July; 13:16	(United States) Deacon Rockoon	SUI 34	(United States) USS Atka, Labrador Sea		(United States) US Navy	
24 July; 13:16		University of Iowa	Suborbital	Ionospheric / Aeronomy	24 July	
24 July; 13:16	Apogee: 90 kilometres (56 mi); eighth in series of 11 SUI flights, 7 of which were successful					
25 July; 06:51	(United States) Deacon Rockoon	SUI 35	(United States) USS Atka, Labrador Sea		(United States) US Navy	
25 July; 06:51		University of Iowa	Suborbital	Ionospheric / Aeronomy	25 July	
25 July; 06:51	Apogee: 90 kilometres (56 mi); ninth in series of 11 SUI flights, 7 of which were successful					
25 July; 12:36	(United States) Deacon Rockoon	SUI 36	(United States) USS Atka, Labrador Sea		(United States) US Navy	
25 July; 12:36		University of Iowa	Suborbital	Ionospheric / Aeronomy	25 July	Successful
25 July; 12:36	Apogee: 90 kilometres (56 mi); tenth in series of 11 SUI flights, 7 of which were successful					
25 July; 15:30	(United States) Deacon Rockoon	SUI 37	(United States) USS Atka, Labrador Sea		(United States) US Navy	
25 July; 15:30		University of Iowa	Suborbital	Ionospheric / Aeronomy	25 July	
25 July; 15:30	Apogee: 90 kilometres (56 mi); eleventh in series of 11 SUI flights, 7 of which were successful					
25 July; 18:45	(United States) Deacon Rockoon	NRL Rockoon 10	(United States) USS Atka, Labrador Sea		(United States) US Navy	
25 July; 18:45		Naval Research Laboratory	Suborbital	Aeronomy	25 July	Successful
25 July; 18:45	Apogee: 85 kilometres (53 mi)					
26 July; 00:29	(United States) Deacon Rockoon	NRL Rockoon 11	(United States) USS Atka, Labrador Sea		(United States) US Navy	
26 July; 00:29		NRL	Suborbital	Ionospheric / Aeronomy	26 July	Launch failure
26 July; 00:29	Apogee: 10 kilometres (6.2 mi)					
26 July; 11:02	(United States) Deacon Rockoon	NRL Rockoon 12	(United States) USS Atka, southern Davis Strait		(United States) US Navy	
26 July; 11:02		NRL	Suborbital	Ionospheric / Aeronomy	26 July	Successful
26 July; 11:02	Apogee: 90 kilometres (56 mi)					

=== August ===
August launches
Date and time (UTC)	Rocket	Flight number	Launch site		LSP	
Date and time (UTC)	Payload	Operator	Orbit	Function	Decay (UTC)	Outcome
Date and time (UTC)	Remarks					
2 August	(Soviet Union) R-1		(Soviet Union) Kapustin Yar		(Soviet Union) OKB-1	
2 August		OKB-1	Suborbital	Missile test	2 August	Successful
11 August; 17:25	(United States) Aerobee RTV-A-1a	USAF 49	(United States) Holloman LC-A		(United States) US Air Force	
11 August; 17:25		AFCRC / University of Utah	Suborbital	Ionospheric	11 August	Successful
11 August; 17:25	Apogee: 92 kilometres (57 mi)					
12 August	(Soviet Union) R-5		(Soviet Union) Kapustin Yar		(Soviet Union) OKB-1	
12 August		OKB-1	Suborbital	Missile test	12 August	Partial failure
12 August	First flight of range test series					
17 August	(Soviet Union) R-5		(Soviet Union) Kapustin Yar		(Soviet Union) OKB-1	
17 August		OKB-1	Suborbital	Missile test	17 August	Successful
19 August	(Soviet Union) R-5		(Soviet Union) Kapustin Yar		(Soviet Union) OKB-1	
19 August		OKB-1	Suborbital	Missile test	19 August	Successful
24 August	(Soviet Union) R-5		(Soviet Union) Kapustin Yar		(Soviet Union) OKB-1	
24 August		OKB-1	Suborbital	Missile test	24 August	Successful
25 August	(Soviet Union) R-5		(Soviet Union) Kapustin Yar		(Soviet Union) OKB-1	
25 August		OKB-1	Suborbital	Missile test	25 August	Successful
27 August	(Soviet Union) R-1		(Soviet Union) Kapustin Yar		(Soviet Union) OKB-1	
27 August		OKB-1	Suborbital	Missile test	27 August	Successful
27 August	(Soviet Union) R-1		(Soviet Union) Kapustin Yar		(Soviet Union) OKB-1	
27 August		OKB-1	Suborbital	Missile test	27 August	Successful

=== September ===
September launches
Date and time (UTC)	Rocket	Flight number	Launch site		LSP	
Date and time (UTC)	Payload	Operator	Orbit	Function	Decay (UTC)	Outcome
Date and time (UTC)	Remarks					
5 September	(Soviet Union) R-5		(Soviet Union) Kapustin Yar		(Soviet Union) OKB-1	
5 September		OKB-1	Suborbital	Missile test	5 September	Successful
8 September	(Soviet Union) R-5		(Soviet Union) Kapustin Yar		(Soviet Union) OKB-1	
8 September		OKB-1	Suborbital	Missile test	8 September	Successful
17 September; 14:31	(United States) Aerobee RTV-A-1a	USAF 50	(United States) Holloman LC-A		(United States) US Air Force	
17 September; 14:31		AFCRC / University of Rhode Island	Suborbital	Solar UV	17 September	Successful
17 September; 14:31	Apogee: 94.6 kilometres (58.8 mi)					
30 September	(Soviet Union) R-2		(Soviet Union) Kapustin Yar		(Soviet Union) OKB-1	
30 September		OKB-1	Suborbital	Missile test	30 September	Successful

=== October ===
October launches
Date and time (UTC)	Rocket	Flight number	Launch site		LSP	
Date and time (UTC)	Payload	Operator	Orbit	Function	Decay (UTC)	Outcome
Date and time (UTC)	Remarks					
1 October	(Soviet Union) R-2		(Soviet Union) Kapustin Yar		(Soviet Union) OKB-1	
1 October		OKB-1	Suborbital	Missile test	1 October	Successful
5 October	(Soviet Union) R-2		(Soviet Union) Kapustin Yar		(Soviet Union) OKB-1	
5 October		OKB-1	Suborbital	Missile test	5 October	Successful
5 October; 18:15	(United States) Aerobee RTV-N-10b		(United States) White Sands LC-35		(United States) US Navy	
5 October; 18:15		NRL	Suborbital	Remote sensing	5 October	Successful
5 October; 18:15	Apogee: 158 kilometres (98 mi); maiden (and only) flight of the RTV-N-10b; returned first images of a complete hurricane					
9 October	(Soviet Union) R-5		(Soviet Union) Kapustin Yar		(Soviet Union) OKB-1	
9 October		OKB-1	Suborbital	Missile test	9 October	Successful
9 October	Airborne destruction of warhead					
14 October; 21:20	(United States) Nike-Nike-T40-T55		(United States) Wallops Island		(United States) NACA	
14 October; 21:20		NACA	Suborbital	Hypersonic research	14 October	Successful
14 October; 21:20	Apogee: 352 kilometres (219 mi), maiden flight of the Nike-Nike-T40-T55					
16 October	(Soviet Union) R-2		(Soviet Union) Kapustin Yar		(Soviet Union) OKB-1	
16 October		OKB-1	Suborbital	Missile test	16 October	Successful
17 October	(France) Véronique-NA		(France) Hammaguir Bechar		(France) LRBA	
17 October		LRBA	Suborbital	Ionospheric	17 October	Launch failure
17 October	Apogee: 39 kilometres (24 mi)					
19 October	(Soviet Union) R-5		(Soviet Union) Kapustin Yar		(Soviet Union) OKB-1	
19 October		OKB-1	Suborbital	Missile test	19 October	Successful
19 October	End of range test series					
29 October	(France) Véronique-NA		(France) Hammaguir Bechar		(France) LRBA	
29 October		LRBA	Suborbital	Test flight	29 October	Successful
29 October	Apogee: 90 kilometres (56 mi); final flight of the Véronique-NA					
30 October	(Soviet Union) R-1		(Soviet Union) Kapustin Yar		(Soviet Union) OKB-1	
30 October		OKB-1	Suborbital	Missile test	30 October	Successful

=== November ===
November launches
Date and time (UTC)	Rocket	Flight number	Launch site		LSP	
Date and time (UTC)	Payload	Operator	Orbit	Function	Decay (UTC)	Outcome
Date and time (UTC)	Remarks					
27 November	(Soviet Union) R-2		(Soviet Union) Kapustin Yar		(Soviet Union) OKB-1	
27 November		OKB-1	Suborbital	Missile test	27 November	Successful
30 November	(Soviet Union) R-1		(Soviet Union) Kapustin Yar		(Soviet Union) OKB-1	
30 November		OKB-1	Suborbital	Missile test	30 November	Successful

=== December ===
December launches
Date and time (UTC)	Rocket	Flight number	Launch site		LSP	
Date and time (UTC)	Payload	Operator	Orbit	Function	Decay (UTC)	Outcome
Date and time (UTC)	Remarks					
1 December	(Soviet Union) R-1		(Soviet Union) Kapustin Yar		(Soviet Union) OKB-1	
1 December		OKB-1	Suborbital	Missile test	1 December	Successful
1 December	(Soviet Union) R-2		(Soviet Union) Kapustin Yar		(Soviet Union) OKB-1	
1 December		OKB-1	Suborbital	Missile test	1 December	Successful
6 December	(Soviet Union) R-2		(Soviet Union) Kapustin Yar		(Soviet Union) OKB-1	
6 December		OKB-1	Suborbital	Missile test	6 December	Successful
9 December	(Soviet Union) R-2		(Soviet Union) Kapustin Yar		(Soviet Union) OKB-1	
9 December		OKB-1	Suborbital	Missile test	9 December	Successful
23 December	(Soviet Union) R-2		(Soviet Union) Kapustin Yar		(Soviet Union) OKB-1	
23 December		OKB-1	Suborbital	Missile test	23 December	Successful
25 December	(Soviet Union) R-2		(Soviet Union) Kapustin Yar		(Soviet Union) OKB-1	
25 December		OKB-1	Suborbital	Missile test	25 December	Successful
30 December	(Soviet Union) R-5		(Soviet Union) Kapustin Yar		(Soviet Union) OKB-1	
30 December		OKB-1	Suborbital	Missile test	30 December	Successful
30 December	Start of validity test series					

- ← Jan
- Feb
- Mar
- Apr
- May
- Jun
- Jul
- Aug
- Sep
- Oct
- Nov
- Dec →

== Suborbital launch statistics ==
=== By country ===
Launches by country
Country	Launches	Successes	Failures	Partial failures
France	4	2	2	0
Soviet Union	59	56	2	1
United States	32	23	9	0
World	95	81	13	1

=== By rocket ===
- Viking (second model)
- Aerobee RTV-N-10
- Aerobee RTV-N-10b
- Aerobee RTV-A-1a
- Deacon rockoon (SUI)
- Deacon rockoon (NRL)
- Nike-Nike-T40-T55
- R-1
- A-1
- R-1D
- R-2
- R-5
- Véronique-NA

Launches by rocket
Rocket	Country	Launches	Successes	Failures	Partial failures	Remarks
Viking (second model)	United States	2	2	0	0	
Aerobee RTV-N-10	United States	3	2	1	0	
Aerobee RTV-N-10b	United States	1	1	0	0	Maiden flight, retired
Aerobee RTV-A-1a	United States	5	5	0	0	
Deacon rockoon (SUI)	United States	14	7	7	0	
Deacon rockoon (NRL)	United States	6	5	1	0	
Nike-Nike-T40-T55	United States	1	1	0	0	Maiden flight
R-1	Soviet Union	22	22	0	0	
A-1	Soviet Union	1	1	0	0	Maiden flight
R-1D	Soviet Union	3	3	0	0	Maiden flight, retired
R-2	Soviet Union	23	21	2	0	
R-5	Soviet Union	10	9	0	1	
Véronique-NA	France	4	2	2	0	Maiden flight, first French Spaceflight, retired

== See also ==
- Timeline of spaceflight
