= 1955 in spaceflight =

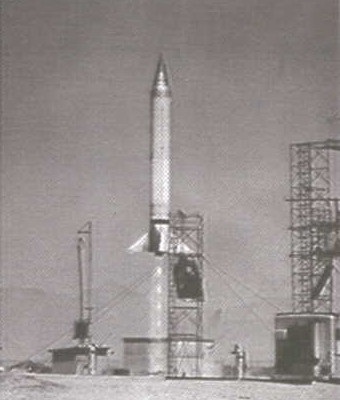
- The Viking made its final flight in 1955

Rockets
- Maiden flights: (United States) Aerobee RTV-N-10c (United States) Aerobee RTV-N-10a (United States) Aerobee Hi (United States) Aerobee AJ10-27 (United States) Loki rockoon (United States) Deacon-Loki rockoon (United States) Nike-Deacon (United States) Nike-Nike-Tri-Deacon-T40 (United States) X-17 (United States) HJ-Nike (Soviet Union) R-1E (Soviet Union) R-5M
- Retirements: (United States) Aerobee RTV-N-10a (United States) Aerobee AJ10-27 (United States) Deacon-Loki rockoon (United States) Nike-Nike-Tri-Deacon-T40

1955 in spaceflight

In 1955, both the United States and the Soviet Union (USSR) announced plans for launching the world's first satellites during the International Geophysical Year (IGY) of 1957–58. Project Vanguard, proposed by the US Navy, won out over the US Army's Project Orbiter as the satellite and rocket design to be flown in the IGY. Development of Intercontinental Ballistic Missiles, the Atlas by the US and the R-7 by the USSR, accelerated, entering the design and construction phase.

Both the US and USSR continued to launch a myriad of sounding rockets to probe the outer reaches of Earth's atmosphere and to take quick glimpses of the sun beyond the obscuring layers of air. The Aerobee Hi, first launched in April, promised a comparatively low cost alternative to other high altitude sounding rockets. The State University of Iowa meanwhile experimented with balloon-launched rockoons on its fourth expedition into the Atlantic Ocean.

== Space exploration highlights ==
=== Sounding Rockets ===
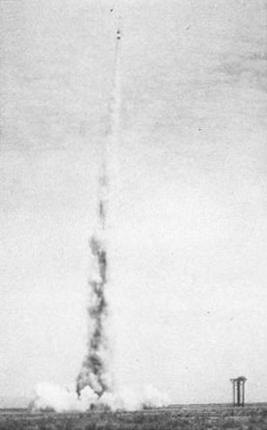
First Aerobee Hi launch, 21 April 1955

The Aerobee family of rockets expanded considerably this year, both in variety and capability. Most significant was the introduction of the Aerobee-Hi, doubling the altitude range of the Aerobee sounding rocket from 125 km (78 mi) to 220 km (140 mi) and increasing the payload carried from 68 kg (150 lb) to 91 kg (201 lb). Able to probe the upper atmosphere, its $30,000 per flight price tag compared favorably to that of its high altitude contemporaries, the Viking and the Bumper; at least one 1955 Aerobee-Hi flight returned scientific data.^{[a]} Other, less capable, Aerobee rockets still lofted instruments beyond the 100-kilometer (62 mi) boundary of space (as defined by the World Air Sports Federation) returning spectra of the Sun in ultraviolet and investigating atmospheric airglow.

The Viking series of rockets wrapped up with the flight of Viking 12, launched 4 February 1955. Reaching an altitude of 143.5 mi (230.9 km), the rocket's K-25 camera snapped an infrared picture of the Southwestern United States, from the Pacific coast to Phoenix, just after reaching its apogee.

A number of sounding rockets based on the Nike booster (used as the first stage in various anti-aircraft missiles), were developed and launched. Just one, the 5 April Nike-Deacon flight, breached the limits of space. The Soviet Union launched three R-1E sounding rocket variants of its R-1 missile (a copy of the German V-2), all carrying dogs as biological payloads.^{[b]}

^{a} (the mission date has not yet been determined) ^{b} (see table below for details and citations)

=== Fourth Atlantic Rockoon expedition ===
Members of the State University of Iowa (SUI) physics department embarked September 1955 on their fourth naval expedition into the Atlantic Ocean to survey the distribution of cosmic rays and auroral radiation by latitude using balloon-launched rockets (rockoons). The team leader was Frank B. McDonald, formerly of the University of Minnesota. Their vessel was the USS Ashland, a World War 2 era Dock landing ship originally used to transport and launch landing craft and amphibious vehicles. Two research teams with the Naval Research Laboratory also sailed on the Ashland. In addition to the Deacon-equipped rockoons that had been used on the prior expeditions, the SUI team experimented with Loki I rockets launched from balloons. The new vehicle worked perfectly, the first being launched 23 September.

This set the stage for the most ambitious missions of the cruise: the launchings of two two-stage Loki I/Deacon rockoons. The first was a failure, the smaller Loki second stage failing to separate from the Deacon. On the second attempt, both stages fired properly. However, two and a half seconds after second stage ignition, telemetry from the rocket abruptly stopped. Professor James Van Allen, head of the SUI physics department, determined that the thin aluminum nosecone on the rocket had melted due to the incredible friction encountered at its speed of more than 8,000 km (5,000 mi) per hour. Had it reached its target altitude, Van Allen later stated, it might well have discovered the Van Allen Belts two and a half years before the missions of Explorer 1 and Explorer 3. As it turned out, no more Loki/Deacon missions were attempted.

== Spacecraft development ==
=== Preparation for the International Geophysical Year (IGY) ===
The origin of the International Geophysical Year can be traced to the International Polar Years held in 1882–1883, then in 1932–1933 and most recently from March 2007 to March 2009. On 5 April 1950, several top scientists (including Lloyd Berkner, Sydney Chapman, S. Fred Singer, and Harry Vestine), met in James Van Allen's living room and suggested that the time was ripe to have a worldwide Geophysical Year instead of a Polar Year, especially considering recent advances in rocketry, radar, and computing. Berkner and Chapman proposed to the International Council of Scientific Unions that an International Geophysical Year (IGY) be planned for 1957–58, coinciding with an approaching period of maximum solar activity. In 1952, the IGY was announced.

In January 1955, Radio Moscow announced that the Soviet Union might be expected to launch a satellite in the near future. This announcement galvanized American space efforts; in the same month, the National Academy of Sciences' IGY committee established a Technical Panel on Rocketry to evaluate plans to orbit an American satellite. Already under consideration was Project Orbiter, an Army plan to use a slightly modified Redstone (a 200 miles (320 km)) range surface-to-surface missile developed the prior year) combined with upper stages employing 31 Loki solid-propellant rockets could put a 5 lb (2.3 kg) satellite into orbit, which could be tracked optically.

On 26 May 1955, the U.S. National Security Council also endorsed a satellite program. On 8 June, United States Secretary of Defense Charles Wilson directed Assistant Secretary Donald A. Quarles to coordinate the implementation of a satellite program, with the United States Department of Defense providing the rocket and launch facilities, and the civilian IGY National Committee producing the satellite and its experimental package, the National Science Foundation mediating between the two agencies. A committee, under the chairmanship of Homer J. Stewart of Jet Propulsion Laboratory, was developed to manage the project to evaluate and choose between the available satellite orbiting options. Project Orbiter now had competition in the form of the Naval Research Laboratory (NRL) plan to develop an orbital capability for its Viking rocket (Project Vanguard), even though the Loki upper stage rockets had been replaced with higher powered Sergeants. On 28 July, confident that a satellite could be lofted during the IGY, President Dwight D. Eisenhower's press secretary, James Hagerty, announced that a satellite would officially be among the United States' contributions to the IGY. The Soviets responded four days later with their own announcement of a planned IGY satellite launch.

By 9 September, the Stewart Committee had chosen the NRL proposal over the Army's citing the Navy's impressive planned Minitrack communications technology and network as well as both the civilian nature and the greater growth potential of the Viking/Vanguard rocket. The contract authorizing the construction of two more Viking rockets (13 and 14) was expanded to include development of the Vanguard rockets. NRL received the assignment to develop the Vanguard satellite in early October.

=== United States ===
In January 1955, Convair was awarded a long-term government contract for the development of the Atlas, America's first ICBM, beginning Phase Three: detail design and development. With the increasing availability of smaller, lighter thermonuclear weapons, the Atlas design could reach a desired range of 5,500 km (3,400 mi) while using just three engines (original plans had contemplated five). Work on the Atlas accelerated in response to a secret report made in February 1955 by James Rhyne Killian to the National Security Council on Soviet rocket progress; in December 1955, Atlas was made the highest-priority project in the nation. In addition, after the issuance of the Killian report, a second ICBM, the Titan, was authorized, along with the Thor Intermediate-range ballistic missile (IRBM), this latter rocket using many of the systems already being developed for Atlas. All three of these missiles were adapted into workhorse orbital delivery rockets, the Atlas offered as a backup alternative to both the Redstone and the Vanguard as an IGY launching vehicle.

Also authorized in the wake of the Killian report was the U.S. Army's Jupiter IRBM proposal, which was to be jointly developed by the U.S. Navy for use on vessels (the Navy dropped out of the project late the following year). The Jupiter also ultimately became a space launcher under the designation Juno II.

=== Soviet Union ===
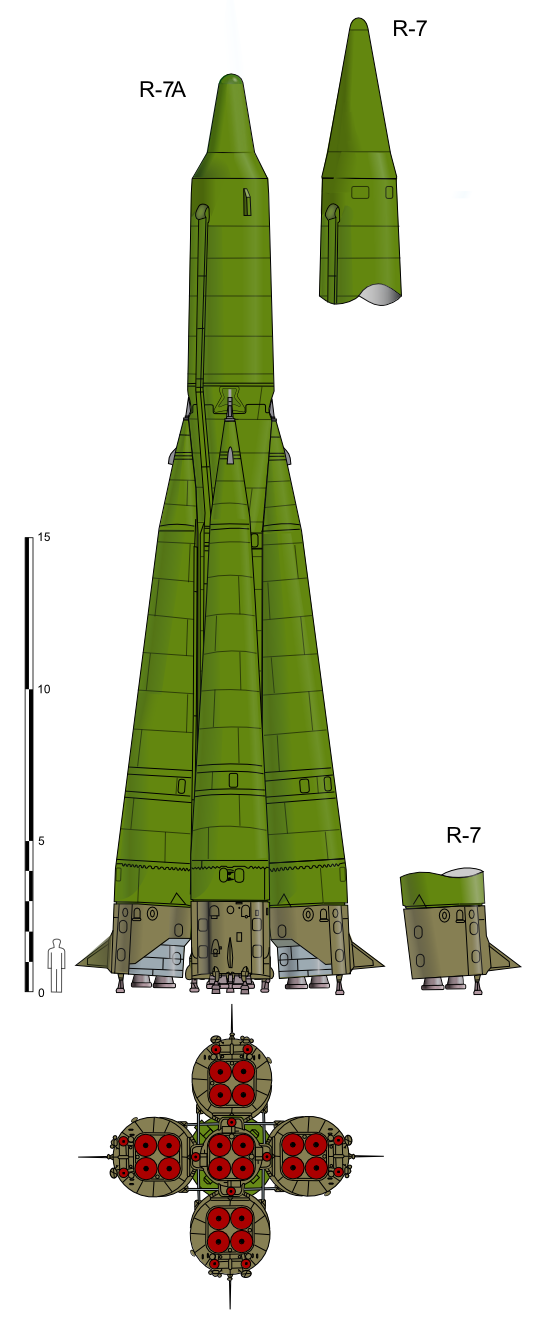
R-7 rocket

The single-stage R-5 missile completed its test launch series and entered operational service in 1955; it was able to carry the same 1,000 kilograms (2,200 lb) payload as its shorter ranged predecessors, the R-1 and R-2 but over a distance of 1,200 kilometres (750 mi). Work then proceeded on an upgrade designated R-5M, with similar launch mass and range, but designed to carry a nuclear warhead. This rocket, which would be the world's first nuclear missile, was a stopgap weapon pending the development of an ICBM, the development of both of which had been decreed by the USSR Council of Ministers in late 1953.

This ICBM was the R-7, whose design began in 1954. Initially contemplated as a two-stage design, the R-7 ultimately employed a cluster of four strapon boosters around a central rocket (or "sustainer"). For the first time, Soviet engineers were developing a rocket with more than a single combustion chamber (in the case of the R-7, there were 32). This ambitious project was the joint effort of three design entities: OKB-1, responsible for the general hydraulic system, NII-885, managing the general electrical system, and OKB-456, developing the engines' layout and thrust sequence. In 1955, after the traditional launch pad proved to be unusable for the R-7, a plan was advanced to suspend the sustainer at the launch site, attaching the strapon cluster there; the entire assembly would be suspended by the launch facility rather than resting on the ground. The first test launches were planned for 1957. The site for these launches, decided 12 February 1955, was Ministry of Defense Scientific-Research and Test Firing Range No.5 (NIIP-5), located in the Kazakh Soviet Socialist Republic (now Kazakhstan) near the Syr-Darya river. The town of Baikonur grew to support the facility.

Though the R-7 was developed explicitly as a nuclear missile, OKB-1's head Sergei Korolev already had plans to utilize the rocket for delivering satellites into orbit. At a private meeting on 30 August 1955, Korolev proposed this possibility Vasily Ryabikov, chairman of the Military Industrial Meeting. This suggestion culminated in the governmental resolution of January 1956 calling for the production of the Soviet Union's first satellite.

== Launches ==
- ← Jan
- Feb
- Mar
- Apr
- May
- Jun
- Jul
- Aug
- Sep
- Oct
- Nov
- Dec →

=== January ===
January launches
Date and time (UTC)	Rocket	Flight number	Launch site		LSP	
Date and time (UTC)	Payload	Operator	Orbit	Function	Decay (UTC)	Outcome
Date and time (UTC)	Remarks					
4 January	(Soviet Union) R-2		(Soviet Union) Kapustin Yar		(Soviet Union) OKB-1	
4 January		OKB-1	Suborbital	Missile test	4 January	Successful
6 January	(Soviet Union) R-5		(Soviet Union) Kapustin Yar		(Soviet Union) OKB-1	
6 January		OKB-1	Suborbital	Missile test	6 January	Successful
8 January	(Soviet Union) R-5		(Soviet Union) Kapustin Yar		(Soviet Union) OKB-1	
8 January		OKB-1	Suborbital	Missile test	8 January	Successful
15 January	(Soviet Union) R-2		(Soviet Union) Kapustin Yar		(Soviet Union) OKB-1	
15 January		OKB-1	Suborbital	Missile test	15 January	Successful
17 January	(Soviet Union) R-5		(Soviet Union) Kapustin Yar		(Soviet Union) OKB-1	
17 January		OKB-1	Suborbital	Missile test	17 January	Successful
20 January	(Soviet Union) R-5M		(Soviet Union) Kapustin Yar		(Soviet Union) OKB-1	
20 January		OKB-1	Suborbital	Missile test	20 January	Successful
20 January	Maiden flight of the R-5M					
21 January	(Soviet Union) R-5		(Soviet Union) Kapustin Yar		(Soviet Union) OKB-1	
21 January		OKB-1	Suborbital	Missile test	21 January	Successful
22 January; 00:54	(United States) Aerobee RTV-A-1a	USAF 51	(United States) Holloman LC-A		(United States) US Air Force	
22 January; 00:54	(United States) Sodium Release 1	AFCRC	Suborbital	Aeronomy	22 January	Successful
22 January; 00:54	Apogee: 94.8 kilometres (58.9 mi)					
22 January	(Soviet Union) R-5		(Soviet Union) Kapustin Yar		(Soviet Union) OKB-1	
22 January		OKB-1	Suborbital	Missile test	22 January	Successful
25 January	(Soviet Union) R-1E		(Soviet Union) Kapustin Yar		(Soviet Union) OKB-1	
25 January		OKB-1	Suborbital	Biological	25 January	Successful
25 January	Maiden flight of the R-1E, carried dogs					
25 January	(Soviet Union) R-2		(Soviet Union) Kapustin Yar		(Soviet Union) OKB-1	
25 January		OKB-1	Suborbital	Missile test	25 January	Successful
28 January	(Soviet Union) R-1		(Soviet Union) Kapustin Yar		(Soviet Union) OKB-1	
28 January		OKB-1	Suborbital	Missile test	28 January	Successful
29 January	(Soviet Union) R-1		(Soviet Union) Kapustin Yar		(Soviet Union) OKB-1	
29 January		OKB-1	Suborbital	Missile test	29 January	Successful
29 January	(Soviet Union) R-5		(Soviet Union) Kapustin Yar		(Soviet Union) OKB-1	
29 January		OKB-1	Suborbital	Missile test	29 January	Successful
31 January	(Soviet Union) R-2		(Soviet Union) Kapustin Yar		(Soviet Union) OKB-1	
31 January		OKB-1	Suborbital	Missile test	31 January	Successful

=== February ===
February launches
Date and time (UTC)	Rocket	Flight number	Launch site		LSP	
Date and time (UTC)	Payload	Operator	Orbit	Function	Decay (UTC)	Outcome
Date and time (UTC)	Remarks					
1 February	(Soviet Union) R-5		(Soviet Union) Kapustin Yar		(Soviet Union) OKB-1	
1 February		OKB-1	Suborbital	Missile test	1 February	Successful
3 February	(Soviet Union) R-1		(Soviet Union) Kapustin Yar		(Soviet Union) OKB-1	
3 February		OKB-1	Suborbital	Missile test	3 February	Successful
4 February; 21:55	(United States) Viking (second model)		(United States) White Sands LC-33		(United States) US Navy	
4 February; 21:55	(United States) Viking 12	NRL	Suborbital	REV test / Photography / Aeronomy	4 February	Successful
4 February; 21:55	Apogee: 232 kilometres (144 mi)					
5 February	(Soviet Union) R-1E		(Soviet Union) Kapustin Yar		(Soviet Union) OKB-1	
5 February		OKB-1	Suborbital	Biological	5 February	Partial Failure
5 February	Carried dogs, not recovered					
7 February	(Soviet Union) R-1		(Soviet Union) Kapustin Yar		(Soviet Union) OKB-1	
7 February		OKB-1	Suborbital	Missile test	7 February	Successful
7 February	(Soviet Union) R-5		(Soviet Union) Kapustin Yar		(Soviet Union) OKB-1	
7 February		OKB-1	Suborbital	Missile test	7 February	Successful
7 February; 18:51	(United States) Aerobee RTV-A-1a	USAF 52	(United States) Holloman LC-A		(United States) US Air Force	
7 February; 18:51		AFCRC / University of Utah	Suborbital	Ionospheric	7 February	Successful
7 February; 18:51	Apogee: 120.4 kilometres (74.8 mi)					
8 February	(Soviet Union) R-2		(Soviet Union) Kapustin Yar		(Soviet Union) OKB-1	
8 February		OKB-1	Suborbital	Missile test	8 February	Successful
8 February	(Soviet Union) R-2		(Soviet Union) Kapustin Yar		(Soviet Union) OKB-1	
8 February		OKB-1	Suborbital	Missile test	8 February	Successful
9 February	(Soviet Union) R-5M		(Soviet Union) Kapustin Yar		(Soviet Union) OKB-1	
9 February		OKB-1	Suborbital	Missile test	9 February	Successful
10 February; 22:38	(United States) Aerobee RTV-A-1a	USAF 53	(United States) Holloman LC-A		(United States) US Air Force	
10 February; 22:38		AFCRC / University of Utah	Suborbital	Ionospheric	10 February	Successful
10 February; 22:38	Apogee: 76.1 kilometres (47.3 mi)					
14 February	(Soviet Union) R-5M		(Soviet Union) Kapustin Yar		(Soviet Union) OKB-1	
14 February		OKB-1	Suborbital	Missile test	14 February	Successful
21 February; 18:25	(United States) Aerobee RTV-N-10c	NRL 29	(United States) White Sands LC-35		(United States) US Navy	
21 February; 18:25		NRL	Suborbital	Solar UV	21 February	Successful
21 February; 18:25	Apogee: 115 kilometres (71 mi), maiden flight of the RTV-N-10c; obtained UV spectrum in 30 second exposure over range 977 to 1817 A. Used University of Colorado biaxial pointer to keep camera trained on the Sun.					
25 February	(Soviet Union) R-2		(Soviet Union) Kapustin Yar		(Soviet Union) OKB-1	
25 February		OKB-1	Suborbital	Missile test	25 February	Successful
28 February	(Soviet Union) R-2		(Soviet Union) Kapustin Yar		(Soviet Union) OKB-1	
28 February		OKB-1	Suborbital	Missile test	28 February	Successful

=== March ===
March launches
Date and time (UTC)	Rocket	Flight number	Launch site		LSP	
Date and time (UTC)	Payload	Operator	Orbit	Function	Decay (UTC)	Outcome
Date and time (UTC)	Remarks					
1 March	(Soviet Union) R-2		(Soviet Union) Kapustin Yar		(Soviet Union) OKB-1	
1 March		OKB-1	Suborbital	Missile test	1 March	Successful
2 March	(Soviet Union) R-2		(Soviet Union) Kapustin Yar		(Soviet Union) OKB-1	
2 March		OKB-1	Suborbital	Missile test	2 March	Successful
19 March; 06:00	(United States) Aerobee RTV-N-10	NRL 26	(United States) White Sands LC-35		(United States) US Navy	
19 March; 06:00		NRL	Suborbital	Airglow	19 March	Successful
19 March; 06:00	Apogee: 115 kilometres (71 mi)					
21 March	(Soviet Union) R-2		(Soviet Union) Kapustin Yar		(Soviet Union) OKB-1	
21 March		OKB-1	Suborbital	Missile test	21 March	Successful
29 March; 16:47	(United States) Aerobee RTV-A-1a	USAF 54	(United States) Holloman LC-A		(United States) US Air Force	
29 March; 16:47		AFCRC / University of Colorado	Suborbital	Solar UV	29 March	Successful
29 March; 16:47	Apogee: 113 kilometres (70 mi)					

=== April ===
April launches
Date and time (UTC)	Rocket	Flight number	Launch site		LSP	
Date and time (UTC)	Payload	Operator	Orbit	Function	Decay (UTC)	Outcome
Date and time (UTC)	Remarks					
4 April	(Soviet Union) R-2		(Soviet Union) Kapustin Yar		(Soviet Union) OKB-1	
4 April		OKB-1	Suborbital	Missile test	4 April	Successful
8 April	(Soviet Union) R-1		(Soviet Union) Kapustin Yar		(Soviet Union) OKB-1	
8 April		OKB-1	Suborbital	Missile test	8 April	Successful
8 April	(United States) Nike-Nike-Tri-Deacon-T40		(United States) Wallops Island		(United States) NACA	
8 April		NACA	Suborbital	REV test	8 April	Launch failure
8 April	Apogee: 18 kilometres (11 mi), maiden (and only) flight of the Nike-Nike-Tri-Deacon-T40					
8 April; 15:19	(United States) Nike-Deacon	DAN-1	(United States) Wallops Island		(United States) US Air Force	
8 April; 15:19		US Air Force	Suborbital	Test flight	8 April	Successful
8 April; 15:19	Apogee: 108 kilometres (67 mi), maiden flight of the Nike-Deacon					
9 April	(Soviet Union) R-1		(Soviet Union) Kapustin Yar		(Soviet Union) OKB-1	
9 April		OKB-1	Suborbital	Missile test	9 April	Successful
12 April	(Soviet Union) R-1		(Soviet Union) Kapustin Yar		(Soviet Union) OKB-1	
12 April		OKB-1	Suborbital	Missile test	12 April	Successful
15 April	(Soviet Union) R-1		(Soviet Union) Kapustin Yar		(Soviet Union) OKB-1	
15 April		OKB-1	Suborbital	Missile test	15 April	Successful
21 April; 15:58	(United States) Aerobee Hi	USAF 55	(United States) Holloman LC-A		(United States) US Air Force	
21 April; 15:58		AFCRC	Suborbital	Test flight	21 April	Successful
21 April; 15:58	Apogee: 192 kilometres (119 mi), maiden flight of the AJ11-6 Aerobee Hi (USAF variant)					
29 April	(Soviet Union) R-5M		(Soviet Union) Kapustin Yar		(Soviet Union) OKB-1	
29 April		OKB-1	Suborbital	Missile test	29 April	Partial Failure

=== May ===
May launches
Date and time (UTC)	Rocket	Flight number	Launch site		LSP	
Date and time (UTC)	Payload	Operator	Orbit	Function	Decay (UTC)	Outcome
Date and time (UTC)	Remarks					
18 May	(Soviet Union) R-2		(Soviet Union) Kapustin Yar		(Soviet Union) OKB-1	
18 May		OKB-1	Suborbital	Missile test	18 May	Successful
20 May	(Soviet Union) R-2		(Soviet Union) Kapustin Yar		(Soviet Union) OKB-1	
20 May		OKB-1	Suborbital	Missile test	20 May	Successful
20 May	(Soviet Union) R-5M		(Soviet Union) Kapustin Yar		(Soviet Union) OKB-1	
20 May		OKB-1	Suborbital	Missile test	20 May	Successful
26 May	(Soviet Union) R-5M		(Soviet Union) Kapustin Yar		(Soviet Union) OKB-1	
26 May		OKB-1	Suborbital	Missile test	26 May	Successful
28 May	(Soviet Union) R-2		(Soviet Union) Kapustin Yar		(Soviet Union) OKB-1	
28 May		OKB-1	Suborbital	Missile test	28 May	Successful
31 May	(Soviet Union) R-2		(Soviet Union) Kapustin Yar		(Soviet Union) OKB-1	
31 May		OKB-1	Suborbital	Missile test	31 May	Successful

=== June ===
June launches
Date and time (UTC)	Rocket	Flight number	Launch site		LSP	
Date and time (UTC)	Payload	Operator	Orbit	Function	Decay (UTC)	Outcome
Date and time (UTC)	Remarks					
1 June	(Soviet Union) R-2		(Soviet Union) Kapustin Yar		(Soviet Union) OKB-1	
1 June		OKB-1	Suborbital	Missile test	1 June	Successful
6 June	(Soviet Union) R-5M		(Soviet Union) Kapustin Yar		(Soviet Union) OKB-1	
6 June		OKB-1	Suborbital	Missile test	6 June	Successful
15 June	(Soviet Union) R-5M		(Soviet Union) Kapustin Yar		(Soviet Union) OKB-1	
15 June		OKB-1	Suborbital	Missile test	15 June	Successful
16 June; 01:11	(United States) Aerobee AJ10-27	USAF 56	(United States) Holloman LC-A		(United States) US Air Force	
16 June; 01:11		Holloman Air Development Center	Suborbital	Classified	16 June	Successful
16 June; 01:11	Apogee: 203 kilometres (126 mi), maiden flight of the Aerobee AJ10-27					
18 June	(Soviet Union) R-1		(Soviet Union) Kapustin Yar		(Soviet Union) OKB-1	
18 June		OKB-1	Suborbital	Missile test	18 June	Successful
20 June	(Soviet Union) R-2		(Soviet Union) Kapustin Yar		(Soviet Union) OKB-1	
20 June		OKB-1	Suborbital	Missile test	20 June	Successful
22 June	(Soviet Union) R-5M		(Soviet Union) Kapustin Yar		(Soviet Union) OKB-1	
22 June		OKB-1	Suborbital	Missile test	22 June	Successful
23 June	(Soviet Union) R-5M		(Soviet Union) Kapustin Yar		(Soviet Union) OKB-1	
23 June		OKB-1	Suborbital	Missile test	23 June	Successful
23 June	(United States) Nike-Nike-T40-T55		(United States) Wallops Island		(United States) NACA	
23 June		NACA	Suborbital	Heat transfer REV test	23 June	Launch failure
23 June	Apogee: 30 kilometres (19 mi)					
23 June; 12:47	(United States) Aerobee Hi	USAF 57	(United States) Holloman LC-A		(United States) US Air Force	
23 June; 12:47		AFCRC	Suborbital	Test flight	23 June	Launch failure
23 June; 12:47	Apogee: 61 kilometres (38 mi), premature burnout at 23 seconds					
24 June	(Soviet Union) R-1		(Soviet Union) Kapustin Yar		(Soviet Union) OKB-1	
24 June		OKB-1	Suborbital	Missile test	24 June	Successful
24 June; 18:04	(United States) Nike-Deacon	DAN-2	(United States) Wallops Island		(United States) US Air Force	
24 June; 18:04		NACA	Suborbital	Aeronomy	24 June	Successful
24 June; 18:04	Apogee: 105 kilometres (65 mi)					
28 June	(Soviet Union) R-2		(Soviet Union) Kapustin Yar		(Soviet Union) OKB-1	
28 June		OKB-1	Suborbital	Missile test	28 June	Successful
28 June	(Soviet Union) R-5M		(Soviet Union) Kapustin Yar		(Soviet Union) OKB-1	
28 June		OKB-1	Suborbital	Missile test	28 June	Successful
30 June	(Soviet Union) R-5M		(Soviet Union) Kapustin Yar		(Soviet Union) OKB-1	
30 June		OKB-1	Suborbital	Missile test	30 June	Successful

=== July ===
July launches
Date and time (UTC)	Rocket	Flight number	Launch site		LSP	
Date and time (UTC)	Payload	Operator	Orbit	Function	Decay (UTC)	Outcome
Date and time (UTC)	Remarks					
1 July	(Soviet Union) R-2		(Soviet Union) Kapustin Yar		(Soviet Union) OKB-1	
1 July		OKB-1	Suborbital	Missile test	1 July	Successful
7 July	(Soviet Union) R-5M		(Soviet Union) Kapustin Yar		(Soviet Union) OKB-1	
7 July		OKB-1	Suborbital	Missile test	7 July	Successful
8 July; 08:39	(United States) Aerobee RTV-N-10	NRL 23	(United States) White Sands LC-35		(United States) US Navy	
8 July; 08:39		NRL	Suborbital	Ionospheric	8 July	Successful
8 July; 08:39	Apogee: 113 kilometres (70 mi)					
9 July	(Soviet Union) R-5M		(Soviet Union) Kapustin Yar		(Soviet Union) OKB-1	
9 July		OKB-1	Suborbital	Missile test	9 July	Successful
13 July; 06:59	(United States) Aerobee RTV-N-10a	NRL 23	(United States) White Sands LC-35		(United States) US Navy	
13 July; 06:59		NRL	Suborbital	Aeronomy	13 July	Successful
13 July; 06:59	Apogee: 69 kilometres (43 mi), maiden flight of the Aerobee RTV-N-10a					
15 July	(Soviet Union) R-2		(Soviet Union) Kapustin Yar		(Soviet Union) OKB-1	
15 July		OKB-1	Suborbital	Missile test	15 July	Successful
25 July	(Soviet Union) R-1		(Soviet Union) Kapustin Yar		(Soviet Union) OKB-1	
25 July		OKB-1	Suborbital	Missile test	25 July	Successful
26 July	(Soviet Union) R-1		(Soviet Union) Kapustin Yar		(Soviet Union) OKB-1	
26 July		OKB-1	Suborbital	Missile test	26 July	Successful
26 July	(Soviet Union) R-2		(Soviet Union) Kapustin Yar		(Soviet Union) OKB-1	
26 July		OKB-1	Suborbital	Missile test	26 July	Successful
29 July	(Soviet Union) R-1		(Soviet Union) Kapustin Yar		(Soviet Union) OKB-1	
29 July		OKB-1	Suborbital	Missile test	29 July	Successful

=== August ===
August launches
Date and time (UTC)	Rocket	Flight number	Launch site		LSP	
Date and time (UTC)	Payload	Operator	Orbit	Function	Decay (UTC)	Outcome
Date and time (UTC)	Remarks					
1 August	(Soviet Union) R-1		(Soviet Union) Kapustin Yar		(Soviet Union) OKB-1	
1 August		OKB-1	Suborbital	Missile test	1 August	Successful
1 August	(Soviet Union) R-2		(Soviet Union) Kapustin Yar		(Soviet Union) OKB-1	
1 August		OKB-1	Suborbital	Missile test	1 August	Successful
3 August	(Soviet Union) R-2		(Soviet Union) Kapustin Yar		(Soviet Union) OKB-1	
3 August		OKB-1	Suborbital	Missile test	3 August	Successful
6 August	(Soviet Union) R-2		(Soviet Union) Kapustin Yar		(Soviet Union) OKB-1	
6 August		OKB-1	Suborbital	Missile test	6 August	Successful
8 August	(Soviet Union) R-2		(Soviet Union) Kapustin Yar		(Soviet Union) OKB-1	
8 August		OKB-1	Suborbital	Missile test	8 August	Successful
9 August	(Soviet Union) R-5M		(Soviet Union) Kapustin Yar		(Soviet Union) OKB-1	
9 August		OKB-1	Suborbital	Missile test	9 August	Successful
12 August	(Soviet Union) R-5M		(Soviet Union) Kapustin Yar		(Soviet Union) OKB-1	
12 August		OKB-1	Suborbital	Missile test	12 August	Successful
16 August	(Soviet Union) R-5M		(Soviet Union) Kapustin Yar		(Soviet Union) OKB-1	
16 August		OKB-1	Suborbital	Missile test	16 August	Partial Failure
24 August	(Soviet Union) R-1		(Soviet Union) Kapustin Yar		(Soviet Union) OKB-1	
24 August		OKB-1	Suborbital	Missile test	24 August	Successful
24 August	(Soviet Union) R-2		(Soviet Union) Kapustin Yar		(Soviet Union) OKB-1	
24 August		OKB-1	Suborbital	Missile test	24 August	Successful
25 August	(Soviet Union) R-1		(Soviet Union) Kapustin Yar		(Soviet Union) OKB-1	
25 August		OKB-1	Suborbital	Missile test	25 August	Successful
25 August; 13:00	(United States) Aerobee Hi	NRL 37	(United States) White Sands LC-35		(United States) US Navy	
25 August; 13:00		NRL	Suborbital	Test flight	25 August	Launch failure
25 August; 13:00	Apogee: 4 kilometres (2.5 mi), maiden flight of the Aerobee Hi (NRL variant), Navy designation: RTV-N-13					
26 August	(United States) X-17		(United States) Cape Canaveral LC-3		(United States) US Air Force	
26 August		ARDC	Suborbital	Test flight	26 August	Launch failure
26 August	Apogee: 3 kilometres (1.9 mi), maiden flight of the X-17					
27 August	(Soviet Union) R-2		(Soviet Union) Kapustin Yar		(Soviet Union) OKB-1	
27 August		OKB-1	Suborbital	Missile test	27 August	Successful
30 August	(Soviet Union) R-2		(Soviet Union) Kapustin Yar		(Soviet Union) OKB-1	
30 August		OKB-1	Suborbital	Missile test	30 August	Successful
31 August	(Soviet Union) R-2		(Soviet Union) Kapustin Yar		(Soviet Union) OKB-1	
31 August		OKB-1	Suborbital	Missile test	31 August	Successful

=== September ===
September launches
Date and time (UTC)	Rocket	Flight number	Launch site		LSP	
Date and time (UTC)	Payload	Operator	Orbit	Function	Decay (UTC)	Outcome
Date and time (UTC)	Remarks					
14 September; 13:30	(United States) Aerobee AJ10-27	USAF 58	(United States) Holloman LC-A		(United States) US Air Force	
14 September; 13:30		AFCRC / University of Michigan	Suborbital	Aeronomy	14 September	Successful
14 September; 13:30	Apogee: 95 kilometres (59 mi)					
15 September	(United States) HJ-Nike		(United States) Wallops Island		(United States) NACA	
15 September		NACA	Suborbital	Test flight	15 September	Launch failure
15 September	Apogee: 10 kilometres (6.2 mi), maiden flight of the HJ-Nike					
19 September	(Soviet Union) R-5M		(Soviet Union) Kapustin Yar		(Soviet Union) OKB-1	
19 September		OKB-1	Suborbital	Missile test	19 September	Successful
23 September	(Soviet Union) R-5M		(Soviet Union) Kapustin Yar		(Soviet Union) OKB-1	
23 September		OKB-1	Suborbital	Missile test	23 September	Successful
23 September	(United States) X-17		(United States) Cape Canaveral LC-3		(United States) US Air Force	
23 September		ARDC	Suborbital	Test flight	23 September	Launch failure
23 September	Apogee: 5 kilometres (3.1 mi)					
23 September; 20:34	(United States) Loki Rockoon	SUI 38	(United States) USS Staten Island, Atlantic Ocean, near Nova Scotia		(United States) US Navy	
23 September; 20:34		University of Iowa	Suborbital	Ionospheric / Aeronomy	23 September	Successful
23 September; 20:34	Apogee: 100 kilometres (62 mi)					
24 September; 16:35	(United States) Deacon Rockoon	SUI 39	(United States) USS Staten Island, Atlantic Ocean, near Nova Scotia		(United States) US Navy	
24 September; 16:35		University of Iowa	Suborbital	Ionospheric / Aeronomy	24 September	Successful
24 September; 16:35	Apogee: 100 kilometres (62 mi)					
24 September; 21:09	(United States) Loki Rockoon	SUI 40	(United States) USS Staten Island, Atlantic Ocean, near Nova Scotia		(United States) US Navy	
24 September; 21:09		University of Iowa	Suborbital	Ionospheric / Aeronomy	24 September	Successful
24 September; 21:09	Apogee: 100 kilometres (62 mi)					
25 September; 20:39	(United States) Loki Rockoon	SUI 41	(United States) USS Staten Island, Atlantic Ocean, near Newfoundland		(United States) US Navy	
25 September; 20:39		University of Iowa	Suborbital	Ionospheric / Aeronomy	25 September	Launch failure
25 September; 20:39	Apogee: 11 kilometres (6.8 mi)					
27 September	(Soviet Union) R-5M		(Soviet Union) Kapustin Yar		(Soviet Union) OKB-1	
27 September		OKB-1	Suborbital	Missile test	27 September	Successful
27 September	(United States) Nike-Deacon		(United States) Wallops Island		(United States) NACA	
27 September		NACA	Suborbital	REV test flight	27 September	Successful
27 September	Apogee: 30 kilometres (19 mi)					
27 September; 19:12	(United States) Deacon Rockoon	NRL Rockoon 14	(United States) USS Staten Island, Labrador Sea		(United States) US Navy	
27 September; 19:12		NRL	Suborbital	Ionospheric / Aeronomy	27 September	Launch failure
27 September; 19:12	Apogee: 11 kilometres (6.8 mi)					
27 September; 19:43	(United States) Deacon Rockoon	NRL Rockoon 13	(United States) USS Staten Island, Labrador Sea		(United States) US Navy	
27 September; 19:43		NRL	Suborbital	Ionospheric / Aeronomy	27 September	Successful
27 September; 19:43	Apogee: 90 kilometres (56 mi)					
27 September; 20:54	(United States) Deacon Rockoon	SUI 42	(United States) USS Staten Island, Labrador Sea		(United States) US Navy	
27 September; 20:54		University of Iowa	Suborbital	Ionospheric / Aeronomy	27 September	Successful
27 September; 20:54	Apogee: 100 kilometres (62 mi)					
28 September; 01:13	(United States) Loki Rockoon	SUI 43	(United States) USS Staten Island, Labrador Sea		(United States) US Navy	
28 September; 01:13		University of Iowa	Suborbital	Ionospheric / Aeronomy	28 September	Launch failure
28 September; 01:13	Apogee: 100 kilometres (62 mi)					
28 September; 12:45	(United States) Deacon Rockoon	NRL Rockoon 15	(United States) USS Staten Island, southern Davis Strait		(United States) US Navy	
28 September; 12:45		NRL	Suborbital	Ionospheric / Aeronomy	28 September	Successful
28 September; 12:45	Apogee: 90 kilometres (56 mi)					
28 September; 14:54	(United States) Deacon Rockoon	SUI 44	(United States) USS Staten Island, southern Davis Strait		(United States) US Navy	
28 September; 14:54		University of Iowa	Suborbital	Ionospheric / Aeronomy	28 September	Successful
28 September; 14:54	Apogee: 100 kilometres (62 mi)					
28 September; 17:40	(United States) Deacon Rockoon	NRL Rockoon 16	(United States) USS Staten Island, southern Davis Strait		(United States) US Navy	
28 September; 17:40		NRL	Suborbital	Ionospheric / Aeronomy	28 September	Launch failure
28 September; 17:40	Apogee: 11 kilometres (6.8 mi)					
28 September; 19:22	(United States) Deacon-Loki Rockoon	SUI 45	(United States) USS Staten Island, southern Davis Strait		(United States) US Navy	
28 September; 19:22		University of Iowa	Suborbital	Test flight	28 September	Launch failure
28 September; 19:22	Apogee: 102 kilometres (63 mi), maiden flight of the Deacon-Loki rockoon					
29 September	(Soviet Union) R-2		(Soviet Union) Kapustin Yar		(Soviet Union) OKB-1	
29 September		OKB-1	Suborbital	Missile test	29 September	Successful
29 September; 13:42	(United States) Deacon Rockoon	SUI 46	(United States) USS Staten Island, Davis Strait		(United States) US Navy	
29 September; 13:42		University of Iowa	Suborbital	Ionospheric / Aeronomy	29 September	Successful
29 September; 13:42	Apogee: 100 kilometres (62 mi)					
29 September; 19:13	(United States) Deacon Rockoon	SUI 47	(United States) USS Staten Island, northern Davis Strait		(United States) US Navy	
29 September; 19:13		University of Iowa	Suborbital	Ionospheric / Aeronomy	29 September	Successful
29 September; 19:13	Apogee: 100 kilometres (62 mi)					
29 September; 21:52	(United States) Deacon-Loki Rockoon	SUI 48	(United States) USS Staten Island, Davis Strait		(United States) US Navy	
29 September; 21:52		University of Iowa	Suborbital	Test flight	29 September	Launch failure
29 September; 21:52	Apogee: 100 kilometres (62 mi), final flight of the Deacon-Loki rockoon					
30 September; 15:50	(United States) Aerobee AJ10-27	USAF 59	(United States) Holloman LC-A		(United States) US Air Force	
30 September; 15:50		AFCRC / University of Utah / University of Colorado	Suborbital	Solar UV	30 September	Successful
30 September; 15:50	Apogee: 74 kilometres (46 mi)					
30 September; 20:10	(United States) Loki Rockoon	SUI 49	(United States) USS Staten Island, Baffin Bay		(United States) US Navy	
30 September; 20:10		University of Iowa	Suborbital	Ionospheric / Aeronomy	30 September	Successful
30 September; 20:10	Apogee: 100 kilometres (62 mi)					

=== October ===
October launches
Date and time (UTC)	Rocket	Flight number	Launch site		LSP	
Date and time (UTC)	Payload	Operator	Orbit	Function	Decay (UTC)	Outcome
Date and time (UTC)	Remarks					
1 October	(Soviet Union) R-2		(Soviet Union) Kapustin Yar		(Soviet Union) OKB-1	
1 October		OKB-1	Suborbital	Missile test	1 October	Successful
1 October	(Soviet Union) R-5M		(Soviet Union) Kapustin Yar		(Soviet Union) OKB-1	
1 October		OKB-1	Suborbital	Missile test	1 October	Successful
4 October; 21:18	(United States) Loki Rockoon	SUI 50	(United States) USS Staten Island, Baffin Bay		(United States) US Navy	
4 October; 21:18		University of Iowa	Suborbital	Ionospheric / Aeronomy	4 October	Successful
4 October; 21:18	Apogee: 100 kilometres (62 mi)					
5 October	(Soviet Union) R-1		(Soviet Union) Kapustin Yar		(Soviet Union) OKB-1	
5 October		OKB-1	Suborbital	Missile test	5 October	Successful
6 October; 10:45	(United States) Deacon Rockoon	NRL Rockoon 17	(United States) USS Staten Island, Davis Strait		(United States) US Navy	
6 October; 10:45		NRL	Suborbital	Ionospheric / Aeronomy	6 October	Launch failure
6 October; 10:45	Apogee: 11 kilometres (6.8 mi)					
6 October; 19:10	(United States) Deacon Rockoon	SUI 51	(United States) USS Staten Island, Davis Strait		(United States) US Navy	
6 October; 19:10		University of Iowa	Suborbital	Ionospheric / Aeronomy	6 October	Successful
6 October; 19:10	Apogee: 100 kilometres (62 mi)					
7 October	(United States) Nike-Nike-T40-T55		(United States) Wallops Island		(United States) NACA	
7 October		NACA	Suborbital	Heat transfer REV test	7 October	Successful
7 October	Apogee: 30 kilometres (19 mi)					
8 October	(Soviet Union) R-1		(Soviet Union) Kapustin Yar		(Soviet Union) OKB-1	
8 October		OKB-1	Suborbital	Missile test	8 October	Successful
11 October; 14:33	(United States) Deacon Rockoon	SUI 52	(United States) USS Staten Island, southern Davis Strait		(United States) US Navy	
11 October; 14:33		University of Iowa	Suborbital	Ionospheric / Aeronomy	11 October	Launch failure
11 October; 14:33	Apogee: 20 kilometres (12 mi)					
11 October; 14:37	(United States) Deacon Rockoon	NRL Rockoon 18	(United States) USS Staten Island, southern Davis Strait		(United States) US Navy	
11 October; 14:37		NRL	Suborbital	Ionospheric / Aeronomy	11 October	Successful
11 October; 14:37	Apogee: 90 kilometres (56 mi)					
13 October; 01:00	(United States) Aerobee RTV-A-1a	USAF 60	(United States) Holloman LC-A		(United States) US Air Force	
13 October; 01:00	(United States) Sodium Release 2	AFCRC	Suborbital	Aeronomy	13 October	Successful
13 October; 01:00	Apogee: 101 kilometres (63 mi)					
13 October; 06:37	(United States) Deacon Rockoon	NRL Rockoon 19	(United States) USS Staten Island, Labrador Sea		(United States) US Navy	
13 October; 06:37		NRL	Suborbital	Ionospheric / Aeronomy	13 October	Successful
13 October; 06:37	Apogee: 60 kilometres (37 mi)					
13 October; 12:44	(United States) Deacon Rockoon	SUI 53	(United States) USS Staten Island, Labrador Sea		(United States) US Navy	
13 October; 12:44		University of Iowa	Suborbital	Ionospheric / Aeronomy	13 October	Successful
13 October; 12:44	Apogee: 100 kilometres (62 mi)					
13 October; 13:42	(United States) Deacon Rockoon	NRL Rockoon 20	(United States) USS Staten Island, Labrador Sea		(United States) US Navy	
13 October; 13:42		NRL	Suborbital	Ionospheric / Aeronomy	13 October	Launch failure
13 October; 13:42	Apogee: 50 kilometres (31 mi)					
13 October; 15:24	(United States) Deacon Rockoon	SUI 54	(United States) USS Staten Island, Labrador Sea		(United States) US Navy	
13 October; 15:24		University of Iowa	Suborbital	Ionospheric / Aeronomy	13 October	Launch failure
13 October; 15:24	Apogee: 20 kilometres (12 mi)					
13 October; 20:13	(United States) Deacon Rockoon	SUI 55	(United States) USS Staten Island, Labrador Sea		(United States) US Navy	
13 October; 20:13		University of Iowa	Suborbital	Ionospheric / Aeronomy	13 October	Successful
13 October; 20:13	Apogee: 100 kilometres (62 mi)					
18 October; 22:49	(United States) Aerobee RTV-N-10c	NRL 34	(United States) White Sands LC-35		(United States) US Navy	
18 October; 22:49		NRL	Suborbital	Solar UV / Solar X-Ray	18 October	Successful
18 October; 22:49	Apogee: 101 kilometres (63 mi)					
22 October; 00:20	(United States) Aerobee RTV-N-10c	NRL 35	(United States) White Sands LC-35		(United States) US Navy	
22 October; 00:20		NRL	Suborbital	Solar UV	22 October	Successful
22 October; 00:20	Apogee: 185 kilometres (115 mi)					
31 October	(Soviet Union) R-2		(Soviet Union) Kapustin Yar		(Soviet Union) OKB-1	
31 October		OKB-1	Suborbital	Missile test	31 October	Successful

=== November ===
November launches
Date and time (UTC)	Rocket	Flight number	Launch site		LSP	
Date and time (UTC)	Payload	Operator	Orbit	Function	Decay (UTC)	Outcome
Date and time (UTC)	Remarks					
1 November	(Soviet Union) R-5M		(Soviet Union) Kapustin Yar		(Soviet Union) OKB-1	
1 November		OKB-1	Suborbital	Missile test	1 November	Successful
4 November	(Soviet Union) R-1E		(Soviet Union) Kapustin Yar		(Soviet Union) OKB-1	
4 November		OKB-1	Suborbital	Biological	4 November	Successful
4 November	Carried dogs, all recovered					
4 November	(Soviet Union) R-5M		(Soviet Union) Kapustin Yar		(Soviet Union) OKB-1	
4 November		OKB-1	Suborbital	Missile test	4 November	Successful
4 November; 15:30	(United States) Aerobee RTV-N-10c	NRL 36	(United States) White Sands LC-35		(United States) US Navy	
4 November; 15:30		NRL	Suborbital	Solar UV	4 November	Successful
4 November; 15:30	Apogee: 135 kilometres (84 mi)					
17 November; 09:15	(United States) Aerobee RTV-N-10	NRL 25	(United States) White Sands LC-35		(United States) US Navy	
17 November; 09:15		NRL	Suborbital	Meteorites / UV Astronomy	17 November	Successful
17 November; 09:15	Apogee: 105 kilometres (65 mi)					
19 November	(Soviet Union) R-2		(Soviet Union) Kapustin Yar		(Soviet Union) OKB-1	
19 November		OKB-1	Suborbital	Missile test	19 November	Successful
19 November	(Soviet Union) R-5M		(Soviet Union) Kapustin Yar		(Soviet Union) OKB-1	
19 November		OKB-1	Suborbital	Missile test	19 November	Successful
23 November	(Soviet Union) R-2		(Soviet Union) Kapustin Yar		(Soviet Union) OKB-1	
23 November		OKB-1	Suborbital	Missile test	23 November	Successful
23 November	(Soviet Union) R-2		(Soviet Union) Kapustin Yar		(Soviet Union) OKB-1	
23 November		OKB-1	Suborbital	Missile test	23 November	Successful
29 November; 17:16	(United States) Aerobee RTV-N-10	NRL 24	(United States) White Sands LC-35		(United States) US Navy	
29 November; 17:16		NRL	Suborbital	Ionospheric	29 November	Successful
29 November; 17:16	Apogee: 132 kilometres (82 mi)					

=== December ===
December launches
Date and time (UTC)	Rocket	Flight number	Launch site		LSP	
Date and time (UTC)	Payload	Operator	Orbit	Function	Decay (UTC)	Outcome
Date and time (UTC)	Remarks					
1 December	(United States) X-17		(United States) Cape Canaveral LC-3		(United States) US Air Force	
1 December		ARDC	Suborbital	Test flight	1 December	Successful
1 December	Apogee: 100 kilometres (62 mi)					
9 December; 14:50	(United States) Aerobee Hi	NRL 38	(United States) White Sands LC-35		(United States) US Navy	
9 December; 14:50		NRL	Suborbital	Test flight	9 December	Launch failure
13 December; 05:00	(United States) Aerobee RTV-N-10a	NRL 28	(United States) White Sands LC-35		(United States) US Navy	
13 December; 05:00		NRL	Suborbital	Airglow / Aeronomy	13 December	Successful
13 December; 05:00	Apogee: 142 kilometres (88 mi), final flight of the Aerobee RTV-N-10a; carried photometers to measure altitude and intensity of airglow at 5577 and 5890-6 A. Also took three ultraviolet spectrograms of the Sun, investigating Ly-α emissions.					
13 December; 17:58	(United States) Aerobee AJ10-27	USAF 61	(United States) Holloman LC-A		(United States) US Air Force	
13 December; 17:58		AFCRC / University of Utah / University of Colorado	Suborbital	Solar UV	13 December	Successful
13 December; 17:58	Apogee: 138 kilometres (86 mi), final flight of the Aerobee AJ10-27					
16 December	(Soviet Union) R-2		(Soviet Union) Kapustin Yar		(Soviet Union) OKB-1	
16 December		OKB-1	Suborbital	Missile test	16 December	Successful
17 December	(Soviet Union) R-2		(Soviet Union) Kapustin Yar		(Soviet Union) OKB-1	
17 December		OKB-1	Suborbital	Missile test	17 December	Successful
21 December	(United States) HJ-Nike		(United States) Wallops Island		(United States) NACA	
21 December		NACA	Suborbital	Test flight	21 December	Launch failure
21 December	Apogee: 10 kilometres (6.2 mi)					
24 December	(Soviet Union) R-2		(Soviet Union) Kapustin Yar		(Soviet Union) OKB-1	
24 December		OKB-1	Suborbital	Missile test	24 December	Successful
27 December	(Soviet Union) R-2		(Soviet Union) Kapustin Yar		(Soviet Union) OKB-1	
27 December		OKB-1	Suborbital	Missile test	27 December	Successful
28 December	(Soviet Union) R-2		(Soviet Union) Kapustin Yar		(Soviet Union) OKB-1	
28 December		OKB-1	Suborbital	Missile test	28 December	Successful
30 December	(Soviet Union) R-2		(Soviet Union) Kapustin Yar		(Soviet Union) OKB-1	
30 December		OKB-1	Suborbital	Missile test	30 December	Successful

- ← Jan
- Feb
- Mar
- Apr
- May
- Jun
- Jul
- Aug
- Sep
- Oct
- Nov
- Dec →

== Suborbital launch statistics ==
=== By country ===
Launches by country
Country	Launches	Successes	Failures	Partial failures
Soviet Union	95	92	0	3
United States	61	42	19	0
World	156	134	19	3

=== By rocket ===
- Viking (second model)
- Aerobee RTV-N-10
- Aerobee RTV-N-10c
- Aerobee RTV-N-10a
- Aerobee Hi (NRL)
- Aerobee RTV-A-1a
- Aerobee Hi (USAF)
- Aerobee AJ10-27
- Deacon rockoon (SUI)
- Deacon rockoon (NRL)
- Loki rockoon
- Deacon-Loki rockoon
- Nike-Nike-T40-T55
- Nike-Deacon
- Nike-Nike-Tri-Deacon-T40
- X-17
- HJ-Nike
- R-1
- R-1E
- R-2
- R-5
- R-5M

Launches by rocket
Rocket	Country	Launches	Successes	Failures	Partial failures	Remarks
Viking (second model)	United States	1	1	0	0	
Aerobee RTV-N-10	United States	4	4	0	0	
Aerobee RTV-N-10c	United States	4	4	0	0	Maiden flight
Aerobee RTV-N-10a	United States	2	2	0	0	Maiden flight, retired
Aerobee Hi (NRL)	United States	2	0	2	0	Maiden flight
Aerobee RTV-A-1a	United States	5	5	0	0	
Aerobee Hi (USAF)	United States	2	1	1	0	Maiden flight
Aerobee AJ10-27	United States	4	4	0	0	Maiden flight, retired
Deacon rockoon (SUI)	United States	10	8	2	0	
Deacon rockoon (NRL)	United States	8	4	4	0	
Loki rockoon	United States	6	4	2	0	Maiden flight
Deacon-Loki rockoon	United States	2	0	2	0	Maiden flight, retired
Nike-Nike-T40-T55	United States	2	1	1	0	
Nike-Deacon	United States	3	3	0	0	Maiden flight
Nike-Nike-Tri-Deacon-T40	United States	1	0	1	0	Maiden flight, retired
X-17	United States	3	1	2	0	Maiden flight
HJ-Nike	United States	2	0	2	0	Maiden flight
R-1	Soviet Union	18	18	0	0	
R-1E	Soviet Union	3	2	0	1	Maiden flight
R-2	Soviet Union	42	42	0	0	
R-5	Soviet Union	8	8	0	0	
R-5M	Soviet Union	24	22	0	2	Maiden flight

== See also ==
- Timeline of spaceflight
