= Aerojet General X-8 =

Experimental spin-stabilized rocket for very high altitude research

X-8 Aerobee
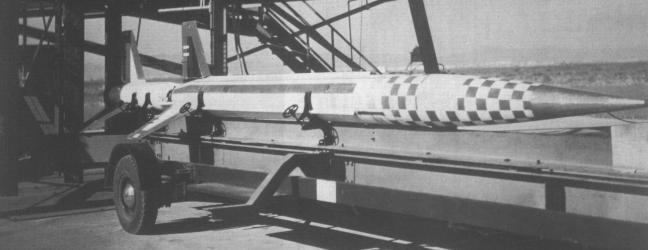
- Aerojet X-8 rocket

General information
- Type: Upper Atmospheric Research Vehicle, X-plane
- Manufacturer: Aerojet General
- Primary users: NACA/NASA United States Air Force; United States Navy
- Number built: 108

History
- First flight: 2 December 1949
- Developed from: Aerobee

The Aerojet General X-8 was an unguided, spin-stabilized sounding rocket designed to launch a 150 lb (68 kg) payload to 200,000 feet (61.0 km). The X-8 was a version of the prolific Aerobee rocket family.

Towards the end of World War II, the US Army and the California Institute of Technology's Jet Propulsion Laboratory had developed a meteorological sounding rocket, the WAC Corporal. The U.S. Army had also captured enough parts to assemble perhaps 100 German V-2 guided missiles. The Army determined that its Project Hermes would be extended to assemble and launch a number of the V-2s for military, technological and scientific purposes. Many of the V-2 components were damaged or useless. Thus the initial intent of the Army was to launch only 20 missiles.

The Army was to make space available on the V-2s for upper atmosphere research. Due to the limited number of V-2s, originally planned design of several competing sounding rockets continued. Jet Propulsion Laboratory initially favored its WAC Corporal despite its inadequacy. The competing rockets were the Applied Physics Laboratory's Aerobee and the Naval Research Laboratory's Neptune (Viking). The Army determined that it would refurbish and manufacture components as necessary to launch many more V-2s than originally intended, making most available for science.

The Aerobee was developed in response to the need for a sounding rocket to replace the dwindling numbers of V-2s. Design and initial development of the Aerobee occurred between June 1946 and November 1947.

The first Aerobees, the Navy RTV-N-8a1 and Army Signal Corps XASR-SC-1, used the Aerojet XASR-1 2,600 lb_{f} (12 kN) thrust air-pressurized engine. Aerojet's XASR-1 was developed from the 1,500 lb_{f} (7 kN) thrust WAC-1 engine of the WAC Corporal sounding rocket. The USAF RTV-A-1 (X-8), Navy RTV-N-10 and Army XASR-SC-2s used the Aerojet XASR-2 2,600 lb_{f} (12 kN) thrust helium pressurized engine. In 1949 the Air Force instigated the development of a more powerful Aerojet engine to replace the 2,600 lb.-thrust XASR-2. This was the 4,000 lb_{f} (18 kN) thrust helium-pressurized AJ 10-25. The USAF X-8A (RTV-A-1a) and USN RTV-N-10a used the seminal Aerojet AJ-10-25 (Air Force) or AJ-10-24 (Navy).

The Army Air Force's Air Research and Development Command, needing its own research programs, initiated Project MX-1011 and ordered 33 AJ-10-25 powered Aerobees as RTV-A-1s. That designation was later changed to X-8. Ultimately the rocket was renamed again as RM-84. The number of X-8s flown came to 60 including 28 X-8s (RTV-A-1), 30 X-8As (RTVM-A-1a), 1 X-8B (RTV-A-1b) with a 2,600 lb_{f} (12 kN) thrust XASR-2 chemically pressurized engine, and 1 X-8C (RTV-A-1c) with a 4,000 lb_{f} (18 kN) thrust AJ 10-25s helium pressurized engine with no booster. The three X-8D with 4,000 lb_{f} (18 kN) thrust AJ 10-25, were never flown. A Navy experimental launch of a stretched Aerobee, the RTV-N-10b resulted in both services requesting improved Aerobees, known generically as Aerobee-Hi.

== Operational history ==
At launch, an 18,000 lb_{f} (80 kN) thrust Aerojet 2.5KS18,000G solid rocket booster fired for 2.5 seconds. After booster jettison, a 2,600 lb_{f} (12 kN) thrust XASR-2 liquid fuel rocket burned for up to 40 seconds (depending on desired apogee). The X-8 recovery sequence was normally started as the rocket descended through about 200,000 ft (60,960.0 m) feet when the fins were blown off to induce a drag producing tumble. At about 20,000 ft (6,096.0 m) the nose cone was blown off the rocket and returned to Earth by parachute. The baseline X-8 measured 20.2 ft (6.2 m) in length and measured 5.25 ft (1.6 m) across the fins. A X-8A reached a maximum altitude of 138.4 miles (222.7 km) Another reached a speed of Mach six. The payloads of the X-8s varied, averaging about 150 lbs. There were 30 X-8s, 30 X-8As, 1 X-8B, 2 X8-Cs and 3 X-8Ds delivered to the Air Force.

The first RTV-A-1 (X-8) flight was USAF-1, flown at Holloman Air Force Base (adjacent to the White Sands Proving Ground). USAF-1 was launched by an Air Force crew commanded by Major Phillip Calhoun, the Aerobee Project Officer, on 2 December 1949. USAF-1 reached an altitude of 59.7 miles (96.1 km) and carried three experiments; a Solar Radiation Soft X-Ray detector for the Air Force Cambridge Research Center, a Pressure-Temperature study for Boston University, and a Color Earth Photography experiment for the Wright-Patterson Air Force Base Equipment Laboratory. Rocket performance was good. Telemetry returned some data. The X-Ray detector foils ruptured and returned no data. Parachute failure resulted in the nose cone containing the experiments to be lost. The nose cone was found in July 1950, the film was destroyed.

The next four flights saw the nose cone recovery parachutes fail.

USAF-6, was a more typical X-8 Mission. It carried a payload of Pressure-Temperature detectors for the University of Michigan, an Air Force Cambridge Center multipurpose beacon, 6 channel PPM-AM system, a Ten channel data recorder supplied by Tufts College, and a camera to photograph a Sperry aspect gyro for the University of Michigan. USAF-6 reached an altitude of 57.5 miles (92.5 km) before a flawless recovery.

From December 1949 until the last X-8A flight on 11/12/1956, the X-8s (RTV-A-1/RTV-A-1a)s flew a great variety of experiments. Typical payloads were solar radiation, temperature, pressure, photography, sky brightness, atmosphere composition, winds, airglow, rocket performance, biological experiments, air density, day airglow, ionosphere, sodium studies, nitric oxide to produce a sporadic E layer, nitric oxide attempt to recombine atomic oxygen, sodium cloud ionization, solar spectrum and atmospheric composition. All but the last X-8 mission were flown from Holloman AFB. The last X-8 was flown for the Signal Corps Electronic Laboratory from Fort Churchill, Canada on 11/12/1956 and studied temperature and winds. After the X-8s Air Force Aerobees were known by their engine model numbers, either AJ-10-27 or AJ-10-34.

== Variants ==
- X-8 - 30
- X-8A - 30
- X-8B - 1
- X-8C - 2
- X-8D - 3

== Specifications (general) ==
Data from The X-Planes: X-1 to X-45.

General characteristics

- Crew: unmanned
- Length: 20 ft 1.5 in (6.134 m)
- Wingspan: 5 ft 3 in (1.60 m)
- Wing area: 36 sq ft (3.3 m^{2})
- Empty weight: 135 lb (61 kg)
- Gross weight: 1,097 lb (498 kg)
- Useful load: 150–300 lbs (68–136 kg)
- Diameter: 15 in (38 cm)

Performance

- Maximum speed: 4,020 mph (6,470 km/h, 3,490 kn)
- Range: 20 mi (32 km, 18 nmi)
- Service ceiling: 800,000 ft (240,000 m)

== See also ==
Related development

- Aerobee
- Aerobee-Hi
