= Frederick C. Durant =

American magician, author, naval test pilot, chemical engineer

- Born: Frederick C. Durant, III; December 31, 1916; Ardmore, Pennsylvania, U.S.
- Died: October 21, 2015 (aged 98); Mount Dora, Florida, U.S.
- Other name: F.C. Durant

Frederick Clark Durant III (December 31, 1916- October 21, 2015) was an American author, naval test pilot, chemical engineer, and expert in rocketry and spaceflight. Durant served as a "key advisor" to U.S. military, intelligence, and space-flight programs, playing a central role in Project Orbiter, the first US satellite program.

In his later years, Durant served as assistant director of the National Air and Space Museum and an editor of Encyclopædia Britannica.

== Childhood and education ==
Durant was a descendant of Thomas C. Durant and engineer Joseph Harrison, Jr. Durant's father was Frederick C. Durant Jr., an engineer educated at MIT and the Colorado School of Mines, who became president of a telephone company

Fred C. Durant III graduated the Haverford preparatory school in 1934. In 1939, Durant earned a B.S. degree in chemical engineering from Lehigh University. From 1939 to 1941, Durant was employed as a chemical engineer with the E.I. Du Pont de Nemours & Co., at Pennsgrove, New Jersey.

== Aviator ==
In May 1941, Durant enlisted as a US naval aviation cadet. Durant went on to serve as naval aviator and flight instructor. In 1946, retired from the Navy at the rank of Commander in the Naval Reserves. In 1951, Durant returned to service as a test pilot, ultimately flying some 30 different types of aircraft.

== Rocketry and spaceflight ==
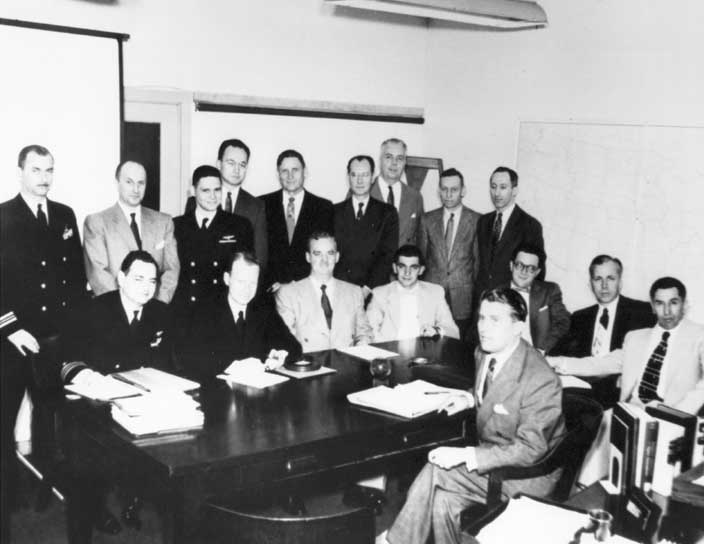
At a meeting of Project Orbiter on March 16, 1954, Fred C. Durant is seen seated at the table, second from the left.

In 1947, Durant began work as a rocket engineer with Bell Aircraft in Buffalo New York. From 1948 to 1951, he served as Director of Engineering at the U.S. Naval Air Rocket Test Station at Dover, New Jersey. In 1953, he became the president of the American Rocket Society

Durant was a Fellow of the British Interplanetary Society, the German Society for Aviation and Space Flight (DGLR), and the Institute of the Aeronautical Sciences Durant was a consultant to the Department of Defense, Bell Aerosystems Co., Central Intelligence Agency, others. From 1954 to 1955, Durant was part of Project Orbiter, along with von Braun.

== Later life: Smithsonian director and author ==
In 1961, Durant moved to D.C., where he would stay until 1999. In 1965, Durant became the assistant director of National Air and Space Museum. He retired from that post in 1980. During his time at the Smithsonian, Durant wrote articles for Encyclopædia Britannica on rockets and spaceflight. In 1983, Durant collaborated with Ron Miller and illustrator Chesley Bonestell on a book entitled Worlds Beyond. The book features a foreword by Arthur C. Clarke.

== Personal life ==
Durant was a lifelong member of Society of American Magicians. He married Celeste Bennett, who died from hepatitis In 1947, Durant married Carolyn Jones ("Pip"). He was father to three sons and one daughter. Durant died in 2015, being preceded in death by his two of his sons: Derek and William.
