= Loki (rocket) =

American unguided anti-aircraft rocket

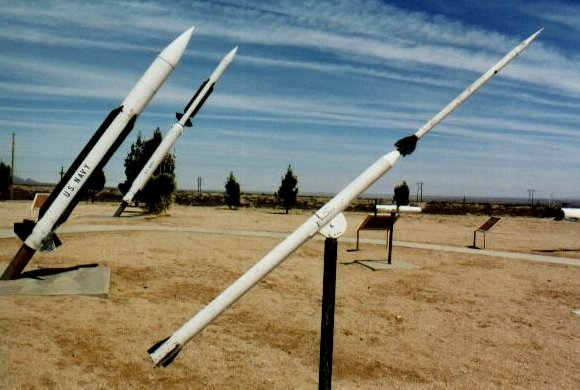
A Loki-Dart (foreground) on display at the White Sands Missile Range rocket garden

Loki, officially designated 76mm HEAA Rocket T220, was an American unguided anti-aircraft rocket based on the German Taifun. Like the Taifun, Loki never saw service in its original role, but later found widespread use as a sounding rocket. It was so successful in this role that several advanced versions were developed on the basic Loki layout, including the final Super Loki.

== Development ==
As part of their anti-aircraft development program of 1942, the Luftwaffe began developing a number of guided missile projects. However, there was concern that these would not develop in time to be useful in the 1943/44 time frame. To fill the gap, Klaus Scheufelen suggested building a simple unguided rocket that would be fired en-masse directly up into the bomber streams. The result was the Taifun.

Taifun was powered by a hypergolic mixture pressure-fed into the combustion chamber. The pressure was provided by small cordite charges that were fired into the fuel tanks, in the process bursting a pair of thin diaphragms to allow the fuel and oxidizer to flow into the combustion chamber. The Germans were never able to get the engine to work reliably, and the rocket was never deployed operationally.

The US Army had initially studied the Taifun in 1946, and the German engineers now working for the Army were convinced the concept deserved more development. When similar concerns about the development time of their own guided missile projects were raised, the Taifun was reconsidered and a development program started at Bendix in 1948. One major change was to replace the warhead area with a dart-like version, which was separated from the main rocket body at engine burnout to continue on without the drag of the airframe and thereby reach higher altitudes.

Like the Germans before them, Bendix had significant problems with the engine, and eventually decided to develop a solid-fuel engine based on a new elastomeric fuel from the Jet Propulsion Laboratory (JPL), starting in March 1951. The first flight of a solid-fuel Loki occurred on 22 June 1951. The new engine was successful, and the liquid engine was abandoned in February 1952.

An initial meeting on June 25, 1954, at the Redstone Arsenal, of Wernher von Braun, Frederick C. Durant, Alexander Satin (of the Air Branch of the Office of Naval Research (ONR)), David Young (of the Army Ballistic Missile Agency), Fred L. Whipple, S. Fred Singer, and Commander George W. Hoover (24 April 1915 - 1 March 1998) resulted in an agreement that a Redstone rocket with a Loki cluster as the second stage could launch a satellite into a 200-mile (320 km) orbit without major new developments.

JPL eventually fired 3,544 Lokis at White Sands during the testing program. These tests demonstrated that the launch of one rocket would affect the flight path of the ones behind it, making the dispersion too large to be a useful weapon. Although this problem was studied in depth, it appeared there was no obvious solution. The Army eventually gave up on Loki in September 1955, in favour of the Nike-Ajax missile, which had recently reached operational status, and the MIM-23 Hawk which was expected to be available shortly.

=== Loki specifications ===
- Payload: 3.2 kg (7.1 lb) (dart)
- Dimensions:
  Booster: 2.63 m long × 76 mm diameter
  Dart: 1.02 m long × 35 mm diameter
- Weight:
  Booster: 13 kg
  Dart: 3.2 kg
- Maximum Height: 55 km
- Maximum Speed 6,275 km/h

== Sounding rockets ==
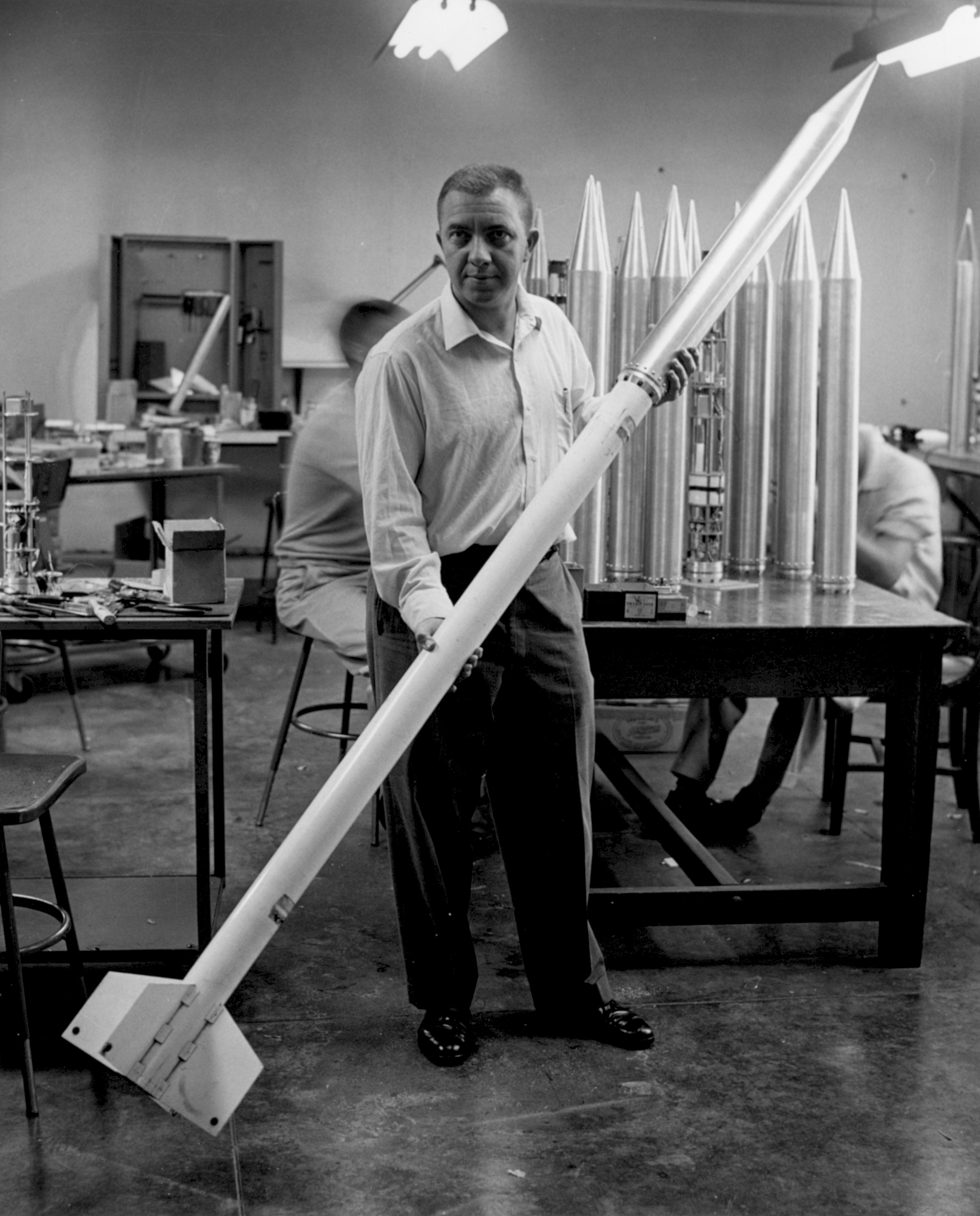
James Van Allen holding a Loki instrumented "Rockoon", Credit: JPL

In 1955 the United States Navy took many of the already-completed Lokis and replaced the explosive warhead with a chaff dispenser. These WASP rockets were fired from ships directly upward, and the chaff released at apogee where it was tracked by radar in order to accurately measure the winds aloft. The USAF also used the Loki for this role, assigning it the name XRM-82. The ONR also used the Loki in some of its Rockoon launches, lofting the Loki to high altitudes on a helium balloon before firing.

Many other Lokis were sold into the civilian market, where they became quite popular for meteorological work, referred to as the Loki-Dart. To better serve the needs in this role, a larger-diameter motor with 50% more fuel was developed in 1957, creating the Loki II, the original retroactively becoming Loki I. Other companies developed additional versions, including the Cooper Development/Marquardt Rocksonde 100 with a 100,000 ft maximum altitude and Rocksonde 200 able to reach 200,000 ft.

A variant known as HASP (High Altitude Sounding Projectile) was launched directly from a 5-inch gun barrel. To stabilize the HASP during firing, the dart's small fins were fitted with "bore riders", which guided the rocket along the rifled barrel and thereby also imparted a spin. The bore riders fell free as soon as the dart exited the gun barrel.

== SDC ==
In 1963 Space Data Corporation (SDC) formed to provide small sounding rockets to the various defence agencies. They used the meteorological rockets and created an instrument payload for the Loki in place of the chaff dispenser. There were at least three variants of the instrument payload, PWN-10, PWN-11, and PWN-12. The instruments consisted primarily of a thermistor to collect temperature, which was broadcast via a small radio operating in the 1680 MHz Meteorological Band. Altitude was tracked from the ground, by reflecting radar off the probe's "starute", a square mylar parachute and radar reflector, or with the PWN-10 by means of a ranging transponder. The SDC version was slightly heavier than the original Loki in order to improve stability during "cruise", which lowered maximum altitude by about 10,000 ft (3,000 m). Production of the Loki Datasonde started in 1966, and more than 20,000 were built until production ended in 1985.

The Air Force requested a version that would not require radar tracking, and SDC responded by placing a transponder in the payload. This increased payload weight, and required the starute to be enlarged, further increasing launch weight. To reach the required altitudes, SDC developed a much larger booster, which also increased overall weight and further improved stability. The resulting Super Loki first flew in 1968, and in the following decades, 9,000 were delivered.

The Air Force Meteorologists and NASA's Observational Scientists desired higher apogees with the ROBINSphere payloads in the early 1970s. In 1972, Space Data completed the development of the 4 1/2-inch-diameter (110 mm) Viper IIIA solid propellant rocket motor. This motor followed the design of the Super Loki nearly identically and provided apogees of ~120 km for the ROBINSphere. This higher apogee allowed for measuring the wind and atmospheric vertical profiles through the 110–95 km region that were unobtainable from the Super Loki boosted ROBINSphere. The ROBINSphere is a calibrated weight inflatable 1 meter diameter radar reflecting balloon, weighing in at about 150 grams. The weight is measured within one-half gram.

A design change occurred in 1993 with a change in the elastomeric solid propellant with the more commonly available polymer, HTPB (hydroxyl terminated polybutadiene). This propellant design change occurred both in the Super Loki and the Viper IIIA.

Orbital Sciences Corporation bought SDC in 1990. The production of the Super Loki and the Viper IIIA rocket boosted meteorological payloads continued until 2001 when the product line was abandoned.

== See also ==
- List of U.S. Army Rocket Launchers By Model Number
