= Aerobee =

American sounding rocket

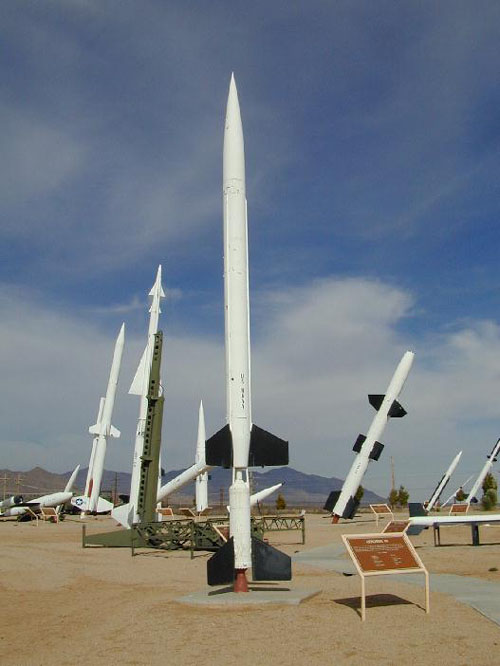
- Aerobee Hi at the White Sands Missile Range Museum
- Function: Sounding rocket
- Manufacturer: Aerojet
- Country of origin: United States

Size
- Stages: 1

Launch history
- Status: Retired
- First flight: 1947
- Last flight: 1985

The Aerobee rocket was one of the United States' most produced and productive sounding rockets. Developed by the Aerojet Corporation, the Aerobee was designed to combine the altitude and launching capability of the V-2 with the cost effectiveness and mass production of the WAC Corporal. More than 1000 Aerobees were launched between 1947 and 1985, returning vast amounts of astronomical, physical, aeronomical, and biomedical data.

== Development ==
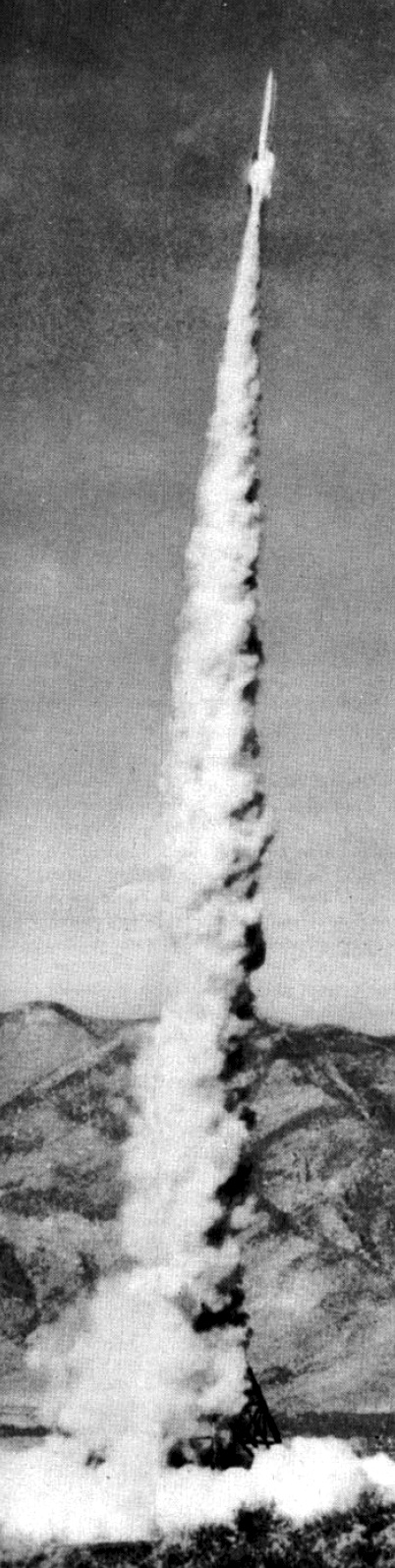
Launch of Aerobee A-5 on 05.03.1948. The flight would breach the 62-mile (100 km) boundary of space (as defined by the World Air Sports Federation)

Research using V-2 rockets after World War II produced valuable results concerning the nature of cosmic rays, the solar spectrum, and the distribution of atmospheric ozone. However, the limited supply and the expense of assembling and firing the V-2 rockets, as well as the small payload capacity of the first purpose-built sounding rocket, the WAC Corporal, created demand for a low cost sounding rocket to be used for scientific research. An Applied Physics Laboratory (APL) effort led by James Van Allen led to a contract presented 17 May 1946 by the Naval Research Laboratory (NRL) to Aerojet, at the time a producer of WAC Corporal rockets, for the procurement of 20 liquid-fueled sounding rockets capable of carrying a 150 pounds (68 kg) payload to an altitude of 300,000 feet (91,000 m). 15 of the new rockets would be allocated to APL, and 5 to NRL. Aerojet was to be the prime contractor while Douglas Aircraft, also a producer of WAC Corporals, would provide aerodynamic engineering and take on some of the production.

The Aerojet designation for the new rocket was "Aerobee", a contraction of Aerojet, manufacturer of the engine, and Bumblebee, a Navy guided missile program. It was a single-stage, liquid-fueled, fin-stabilized rocket, using a solid-propellant rocket motor as a booster. This booster was jettisoned after 2.5 seconds of operation. The nose cone containing the telemetry transmitter and the scientific payload was recoverable and returned to earth on a parachute. As with its progenitor, the WAC Corporal, the Aerobee required a tall launch tower to provide the necessary stability until the relatively slowly accelerating rocket gained enough speed for its fins to be effective in controlling attitude. Launch towers were adjustable in inclination and azimuth to compensate for wind.

On 25 September 1947, a dummy Aerobee attached to a live booster engine was launched from White Sands Missile Range, New Mexico for flight testing. This was followed (after two more dummy tests in October) by the first complete Aerobee launch on 24 November. The flight was terminated after 35 seconds when the rocket's tail began yawing back and forth. This Aerobee was the first rocket fired by the US Navy at White Sands and the subject of the first comprehensive missile range safety program.

The next Aerobee launch, on 5 March 1948, was a complete success, achieving an altitude of 73 miles (117 km) and breaching the 62-mile (100 km) boundary of space (as defined by the World Air Sports Federation).

== Operational history ==
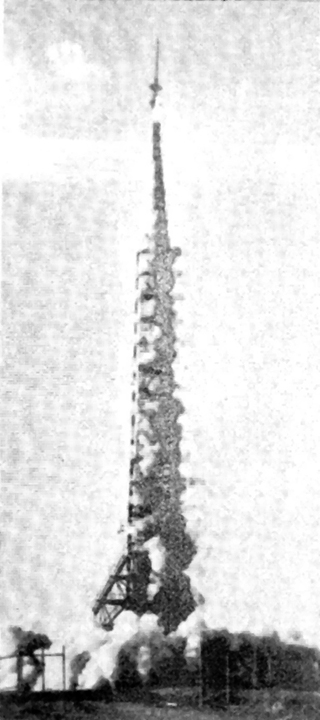
First Aerobee RTV-A-1 launch, 2 December 1949

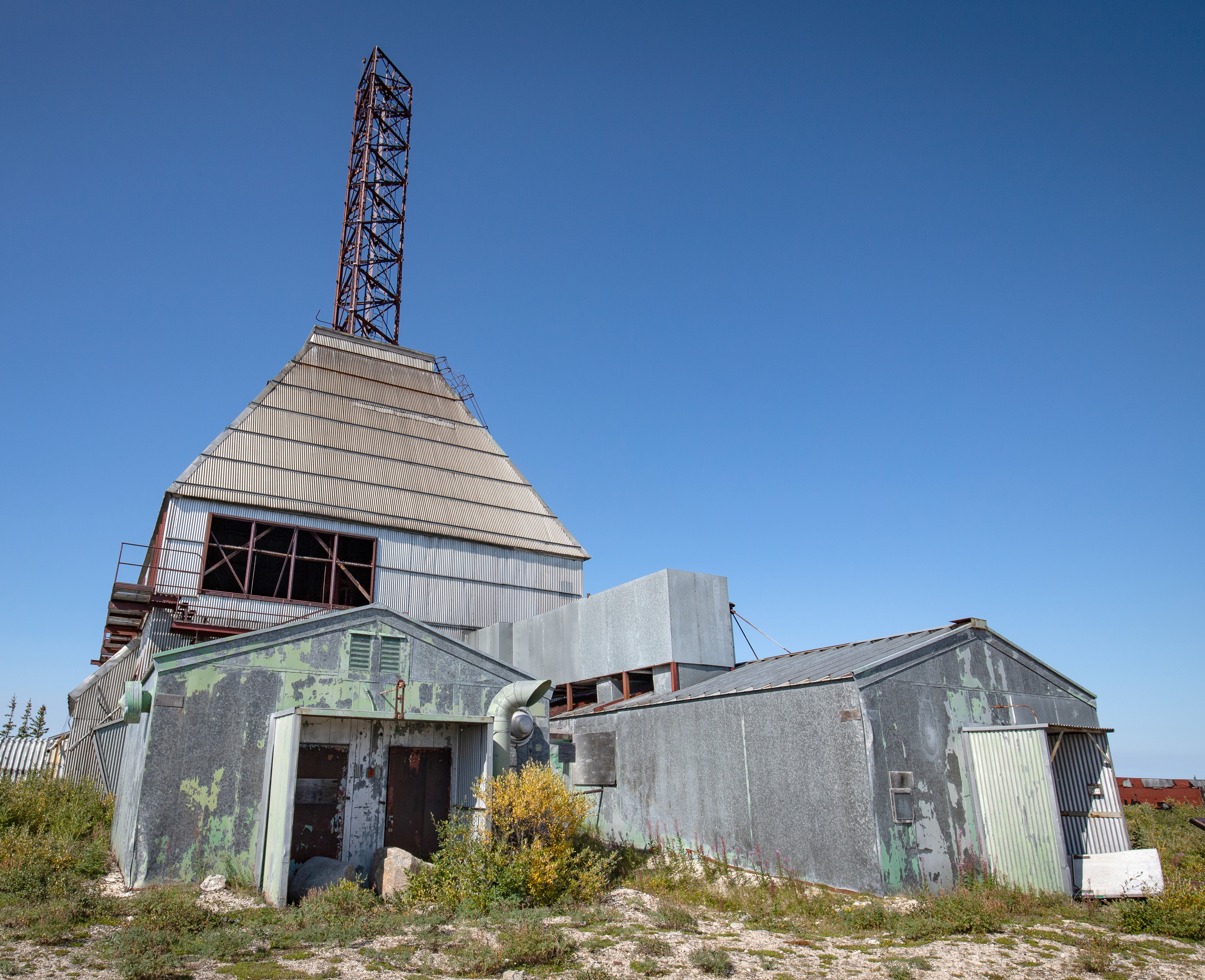
Aerobee rocket launcher, Churchill, Manitoba

=== Early launches ===
The original Aerobee design was designated RTV-N-8 by the Navy and XASR-1 by Aerojet and the Army. This rocket was powered by the XASR-1 (Nitric acid/Aniline), a 11.5 kilonewtons (2,600 lb_{f}) version of the 21AL-2600 engine also used in the Nike Ajax.

The XASR-1 engine was superseded by the XASR-2, which used helium for fuel tank pressurization instead of compressed air. First flying in late 1949, Aerobees using the new engine were designated RTV-N-10(a) by the Navy and RTV-A-1 by the Air Force. Variants on this design employed by the Air Force included the RTV-A-1a, which used an Aerojet AJ10-25 sustainer with 18 kilonewtons (4,000 lb_{f}) of thrust, but with a shorter duration; the RTV-A-1c, identical but without a solid rocket booster; the RTV-A-1b, using the XASR-1 engine, but with chemical pressurization; and the RTV-A-1d, using the 18 kilonewtons (4,000 lb_{f}) engine of the −1a, with chemical pressurization, and launched without booster.

The Navy also evolved their XASR-2 Aerobees. The RTV-N-10b used a variant of the −10a's engine with a higher specific impulse; the RTV-N-10c was a production variant of the −10b. The USAF fielded a production version of the RTV-N-10b, which did not get an official designation.

On 2 December 1949, the Air Force launched its first Aerobee from Holloman AFB Launch Complex A. Though the rocket flew to nearly 60 miles (97 km) in altitude and took the first color motion-pictures of the Earth from space, the payload was lost and not recovered until 13 July 1950, by which point the film (as well as x-ray emulsions that had also been carried aboard) were unsalvageable. This inauspicious beginning was followed by 32 more Aerobee flights, most of which were successful, including the first successful flight of a monkey, on 18 April 1951.

By the early 1950s Aerobee was the sounding rocket of choice being flown by the Navy Research Laboratory, USAF, and Army Signal Corps. The cost of lofting a pound of scientific payload to altitude was significantly lower than that of any competitor. In 1955, the USAF's RTV-A-1 rockets were redesignated X-8 (X-8a-d corresponding with the old RTV-A-1a-d series).

=== Later versions ===
The first major derivative version, the Aerobee-Hi (first launched in 1955) featured an increase in length, fuel capacity and improved engineering design. There were two versions of the Aerobee-Hi. The Air Force Aerobee Hi, (MX-1960, XRM-84) and the slightly longer Navy Aerobee-Hi (RV-N-13, PWN-2A). Engine development continued with the AJ11-6, AJ11-18, AJ11-20, AJ11-21, and AGVL0113C/F/H/I of the Aerobee-Hi. The Aerobe-Hi was boosted by the 2.5KS-18000 booster. The Navy Aerobee-Hi was considerably different from the Air Force Aerobee-Hi, using the fuel pressure regulator from the Nike Ajax, a delayed start function and a pressure sealed tail cone to allow better measurement of the external upper atmosphere.

Following the creation of NASA, development of Aerobees became largely guided by NASA. Exceptions developed for the armed services included the Aerobee 170, aka Nike-Aerobee, which combined the Nike M5E1 booster with the Aerobee 150, and the Aerobee 300 which used a AIM-7 Sparrow missile motor in its second stage; the Aerobee 300 was also known as the Sparrowbee. There were versions of Aerobee-Hi such as the Aerobee 150 and 150A in which case the difference was in the number of fins, the 150 having three and the 150A four. The Aerobee 100 was essentially a shortened Aerobee 150 with an AJ11 engine. By far the largest of the Aerobee series was the Aerobee 350, composed of four clustered Aerobee 150s boosted by a Nike M5E1. Though they bore the Aerobee appellation, the Aerobee 75 and proposed Aerobee 90 were not actually related to the others in that they were solid propellant rockets with the 75 having a HAWK motor, the 90 was a 75 with a Sparrow second stage.

Over the decades of development Aerobees were flown with many related engines including the XASR-1 (21AL-2600), 45AL-2600, AJ10-24, AJ10-25, AJ10-27, AJ10-34, AJ11-6, and AJ60-92. Later versions of the AJ10 and AJ-11 engines produced 17.8 kilonewtons (4,000 lb_{f}) of thrust. Boosters included surplus Nike M5E1 boosters and VKM-17 and VKM-20s as well as the original 2.5KS-18000.

Launch towers for Aerobee rockets were built at the White Sands Missile Range and Holloman AFB in New Mexico; Wallops Flight Facility in Virginia; Eglin AFB in Florida; Churchill Rocket Research Range in Manitoba, Canada; and Woomera, South Australia. Aerobees were also launched from Centro de Lancamento da Barreira do Inferno (CLBI), Natal, Rio Grande N, Brazil; Kauai Test Facility, Barking Sands, Kauai; Nouadhibou, Dakhlet Nouadhibou, Mauritania; Vandenberg AFB, California; Walker's Cay, Bahamas; and aboard the research vessel USS Norton Sound. Two Seabee missiles were launched from the sea off Point Mugu, California. The Seabee's (Sea launched Aerobees) were launched from a position floating in water as part of Robert Truax's Sea Dragon project for Aerojet. The Aerobees launched from overseas locations such as the Bahamas used a modified launch tower that had originally been used on the USS Norton Sound. NASA further modified that tower into the Mobile Aerobee Launch Facility (MALF) which was first used in 1966 for launches from Natal, Brazil.

A total of 1,037 Aerobees (including variants) were launched from all locations with a success rate in excess of 97%. More than half of these were Aerobee 150/150As. The last Aerobee, a 150 MI, flew an Airglow payload at White Sands on 17 January 1985.

=== Australian launches ===
The Agreement between the Government of Australia and the Government of the United States of America regarding the Launching of Three Aerobee Rockets was established in Canberra, March 1970. A similar treaty was agreed to in 1973 for seven launches, and in 1977 for six launches for various astronomical and solar experiments conducted by NASA Goddard Space Flight Center.

In 1974, the US DARPA through Air Force Cambridge Research Laboratory and Australia agreed to launch three rockets under project Hi Star South.

A total of 20 Aerobee launches were made at Woomera Test Range:

- Series 150: 3 launches in May/June 1970
- Series 170: 7 launches in November 1973 and 2 launches February 1977
- Series 200: 3 launches in September 1974
- Series 200A: 5 launches in February 1977

== Accomplishments ==
=== Science ===
The scientific research done with the Aerobee family included photography, biomedical research, biology, the study of energetic particles, ionospheric physics, meteorology, radio astronomy, solar physics, aeronomy, spectrometry, signals intelligence research, infrared studies, magnetometry, ultraviolet and X-ray astronomy, as well as many other fields such as aerodynamic research and missile technology development. Aerobees were a vital part of America's efforts in the International Geophysical Year, comprising more than half of the allocated IGY sounding rocket budget.

The earliest space biomedical missions were launched via Aerobee: Three Air Force missions carrying mice and monkeys, launched 1951–52, determined that the brief (~15 minutes) exposure to acceleration, reduced gravity, and high altitude cosmic radiation did not have significant negative effects.

An Aerobee 150 launched on 19 June 1962 (UTC) detected the first X-rays emitted from a source outside the Solar System (Scorpius X-1).

=== First payload to interplanetary space ===
On 16 October 1957, Aerobee USAF-88 was launched from Holloman LC-A in New Mexico to hurl the first artificial objects into interplanetary space. Several varieties of aluminum cones packed with explosive charges were mounted in the rocket's nose cone. 91 seconds after liftoff, at an altitude of 85 km (53 mi), the charges were fired. A bright green flash ensued, observable from Palomar Observatory 1,000 km (620 mi) away. Post-launch analysis suggested that at least two fragments from the exploding charges had soared away from the Earth with twice the kinetic energy necessary to reach escape velocity and become the first artificial satellites of the Sun. When the achievement was announced the following month, it was compared favorably in the contemporary press to the Soviet launch of the first artificial satellite, Sputnik 1, just 12 days before the Aerobee launch. However, subsequent analysis by space historian Jonathan McDowell suggests that none of the payload fragments actually achieved escape velocity.

== Legacy ==
An artifact of the Aerobee programs, which remains in use today, is the large enclosed launch tower built for the Aerobee 350 at White Sands Launch Complex 36.

== Technical data ==
Aerobee details by version
Version	Operator	Payload capacity	Maximum flight altitude	Engine	Liftoff thrust	Total mass	Core diameter	Total length	First launch	Last launch	Total launches
Aerobee RTV-N-8	NRL	68 kg (150 lb)	118 km (73 mi)	XASR-1	11.5 kN (2,600 lb_{f})	745 kg (1,642 lb)	.38 m (1 ft 3 in)	7.9 m (26 ft)	25 September 1947	14 February 1950	19
Aerobee XASR-SC-1	Army Signal Corps	68 kg (150 lb)	117 km (73 mi)	XASR-1	11.5 kN (2,600 lb_{f})	745 kg (1,642 lb)	.38 m (1 ft 3 in)	7.9 m (26 ft)	9 December 1948	10 August 1956	21
Aerobee RTV-A-1	U.S. Air Force	68 kg (150 lb)	116 km (72 mi)	XASR-2	11.5 kN (2,600 lb_{f})	745 kg (1,642 lb)	.38 m (1 ft 3 in)	7.9 m (26 ft)	2 December 1949	12 December 1952	28
Aerobee RTV-N-10	NRL	68 kg (150 lb)	143 km (89 mi)	XASR-2	11.5 kN (2,600 lb_{f})	700 kg (1,500 lb)	.38 m (1 ft 3 in)	7.9 m (26 ft)	15 January 1950	17 September 1957	27
Aerobee XASR-SC-2	Army Signal Corps	68 kg (150 lb)	124 km (77 mi)	XASR-2	11.5 kN (2,600 lb_{f})	700 kg (1,500 lb)	.38 m (1 ft 3 in)	7.9 m (26 ft)	26 April 1950	1 September 1953	13
Aerobee RTV-A-1b	U.S. Air Force	68 kg (150 lb)	116 km (72 mi)	XASR-2	11.5 kN (2,600 lb_{f})	745 kg (1,642 lb)	.38 m (1 ft 3 in)	7.9 m (26 ft)	30 August 1951	30 August 1951	1
Aerobee RTV-A-1a	U.S. Air Force	68 kg (150 lb)	130 km (81 mi)	AJ10-25	17.8 kN (4,000 lb_{f})	770 kg (1,700 lb)	.38 m (1 ft 3 in)	7.8 m (26 ft)	17 October 1951	12 November 1956	31
Aerobee RTV-A-1c	U.S. Air Force	68 kg (150 lb)	0 km (0 mi)	AJ10-25	17.8 kN (4,000 lb_{f})	510 kg (1,120 lb)	.38 m (1 ft 3 in)	7.8 m (26 ft)	19 February 1952	19 February 1952	1
Aerobee RTV-N-10b	NRL	68 kg (150 lb)	158 km (98 mi)	AJ10-24	17.8 kN (4,000 lb_{f})	770 kg (1,700 lb)	.38 m (1 ft 3 in)	7.8 m (26 ft)	5 October 1954	5 October 1954	1
Aerobee RTV-N-10c	NRL	68 kg (150 lb)	185 km (115 mi)	AJ10-34	17.8 kN (4,000 lb_{f})	770 kg (1,700 lb)	.38 m (1 ft 3 in)	7.8 m (26 ft)	21 February 1955	29 March 1957	6
Aerobee Hi	All	68 kg (150 lb)	240 km (150 mi) (Navy variant); 270 km (170 mi) (USAF variant)	45AL-2600	11.7 kN (2,600 lb_{f})	930 kg (2,050 lb)	.38 m (1 ft 3 in)	9.5 m (31 ft)	21 April 1955	19 April 1960	44
Aerobee AJ10-27	U.S. Air Force	68 kg (150 lb)	203 km (126 mi)	AJ10-27	17.8 kN (4,000 lb_{f})	770 kg (1,700 lb)	.38 m (1 ft 3 in)	7.8 m (26 ft)	16 June 1955	13 December 1955	4
Aerobee RTV-N-10a	NRL	68 kg (150 lb)	142 km (88 mi)	AJ10-25	17.8 kN (4,000 lb_{f})	770 kg (1,700 lb)	.38 m (1 ft 3 in)	7.8 m (26 ft)	13 July 1955	13 December 1955	2
Aerobee AJ10-34	U.S. Air Force	68 kg (150 lb)	146 km (91 mi)	AJ10-34	17.8 kN (4,000 lb_{f})	770 kg (1,700 lb)	.38 m (1 ft 3 in)	7.8 m (26 ft)	8 May 1956	13 February 1960	15
Aerobee AJ10-25	U.S. Air Force	68 kg (150 lb)	61 km (38 mi)	AJ10-25	17.8 kN (4,000 lb_{f})	770 kg (1,700 lb)	.38 m (1 ft 3 in)	7.8 m (26 ft)	9 April 1957	9 April 1957	1
Aerobee 100	USAF/NRL/NASA	68 kg (150 lb)	110 km (68 mi)	Aerobee 100	17.8 kN (4,000 lb_{f})	770 kg (1,700 lb)	.38 m (1 ft 3 in)	7.8 m (26 ft)	18 February 1958	20 November 1962	18
Aerobee 75	USAF/Army	68 kg (150 lb)	60 km (37 mi)	Aerobee 75-1	7 kN (1,600 lb_{f})	400 kg (880 lb)	.35 m (1 ft 2 in)	6 m (20 ft)	23 May 1958	22 November 1958	4
Aerobee 300 (Sparrowbee)	USAF/UoM	45 kg (99 lb)	418 km (260 mi)	Aerobee 150-2	18 kN (4,000 lb_{f})	983 kg (2,167 lb)	.38 m (1 ft 3 in)	9.90 m (32.5 ft)	22 October 1958	20 March 1965	21
Aerobee 150	USAF/NASA/NRL	68 kg (150 lb)	325 km (202 mi)	AJ11-21	18 kN (4,000 lb_{f})	930 kg (2,050 lb)	0.38 m (1 ft 3 in)	9.30 m (30.5 ft)	5 February 1959	22 September 1983	453
Aerobee 150A	NASA	68 kg (150 lb)	370 km (230 mi)	AJ11-21	18 kN (4,000 lb_{f})	900 kg (2,000 lb)	0.38 m (1 ft 3 in)	9.30 m (30.5 ft)	25 March 1960	23 May 1973	68
Aerobee 300A	NASA	45 kg (99 lb)	415 km (258 mi)	Aerobee 150-2	18 kN (4,000 lb_{f})	983 kg (2,167 lb)	.38 m (1 ft 3 in)	9.90 m (32.5 ft)	3 August 1960	29 January 1964	21
Aerobee 350	NASA	227 kg (500 lb)	374 km (232 mi)	Aerobee 150 x4	217 kN (49,000 lb_{f})	3,839 kg (8,464 lb)	0.56 m (1 ft 10 in)	15.90 m (52.2 ft)	11 December 1964	9 May 1984	20
Aerobee 150 MI	NASA	68 kg (150 lb)	370 km (230 mi)	AJ11-21	18 kN (4,000 lb_{f})	900 kg (2,000 lb)	0.38 m (1 ft 3 in)	9.30 m (30.5 ft)	13 September 1968	17 January 1985	20
Aerobee 170	NASA/NRL/USAF	68 kg (150 lb)	270 km (170 mi)	Nike + AJ11-21	225 kN (51,000 lb_{f})	1,270 kg (2,800 lb)	0.42 m (1 ft 5 in)	12.60 m (41.3 ft)	16 September 1968	19 April 1983	111
Aerobee 150 MII	NASA	68 kg (150 lb)	168 km (104 mi)	AJ11-21	18 kN (4,000 lb_{f})	900 kg (2,000 lb)	0.38 m (1 ft 3 in)	9.30 m (30.5 ft)	2 July 1970	2 July 1970	1
Aerobee 170B	NASA	68 kg (150 lb)	191 km (119 mi)	Nike + AJ11-21	225 kN (51,000 lb_{f})	1,270 kg (2,800 lb)	0.42 m (1 ft 5 in)	12.60 m (41.3 ft)	9 July 1971	9 July 1971	1
Aerobee 170A	NASA	68 kg (150 lb)	214 km (133 mi)	Nike + AJ11-21	217 kN (49,000 lb_{f})	1,270 kg (2,800 lb)	0.42 m (1 ft 5 in)	12.40 m (40.7 ft)	10 August 1971	16 November 1978	26
Aerobee 200A	NASA	68 kg (150 lb)	297 km (185 mi)	Nike + AJ60-92	225 kN (51,000 lb_{f})	1,600 kg (3,500 lb)	0.42 m (1 ft 5 in)	12.60 m (41.3 ft)	20 November 1972	4 February 1978	51
Aerobee 200	USAF	68 kg (150 lb)	248 km (154 mi)	Nike + AJ60-92	225 kN (51,000 lb_{f})	1,600 kg (3,500 lb)	0.42 m (1 ft 5 in)	12.60 m (41.3 ft)	4 September 1974	11 May 1976	4
Aerobee 150 MIII	NASA	68 kg (150 lb)	172 km (107 mi)	AJ11-21	18 kN (4,000 lb_{f})	900 kg (2,000 lb)	0.38 m (1 ft 3 in)	9.30 m (30.5 ft)	10 March 1973	10 March 1973	1

An additional 36 Aerobees of unknown type were launched by the Army, Navy and Air Force between 1957 and 1959:

Aerobee versions and stages
Version	Booster	Stage 1	Stage 2
Aerobee AJ10-25	Aerojet X103C10	Aerobee AJ10-25	-
Aerobee AJ10-27	Aerojet X103C10	Aerobee AJ10-27	-
Aerobee AJ10-34	Aerojet X103C10	Aerobee AJ10-34	-
Aerobee Hi	Aerojet X103C10	Aerobee 150	-
Aerobee RTV-A-1 (X-8)	Aerojet X103C10	Aerobee XASR-1	-
Aerobee RTV-A-1a (X-8A)	Aerojet X103C10	Aerobee AJ10-25	-
Aerobee RTV-A-1b (X-8B)	Aerojet X103C10	Aerobee XASR-1	-
Aerobee RTV-N-10	Aerojet X103C10	Aerobee XASR-1	-
Aerobee RTV-N-10a	Aerojet X103C10	Aerobee AJ10-25	-
Aerobee RTV-N-10b	Aerojet X103C10	Aerobee AJ10-24	-
Aerobee RTV-N-10c	Aerojet X103C10	Aerobee AJ10-34	-
Aerobee RTV-N-8	Aerojet X103C10	Aerobee XASR-1	-
Aerobee XASR-SC-1	Aerojet X103C10	Aerobee XASR-1	-
Aerobee XASR-SC-2	Aerojet X103C10	Aerobee XASR-1	-
Aerobee 100 (Aerobee Junior)	Aerojet X103C10	Aerobee 100	-
Aerobee 150	Aerojet X103C10	Aerobee 150	-
Aerobee 150A	Aerojet X103C10	Aerobee 150A	-
Aerobee 170	Nike / M5-E1	Aerobee 150	-
Aerobee 170A	Nike / M5-E1	Aerobee 150A	-
Aerobee 170B	Nike / M5-E1	Aerobee 150B	-
Aerobee 200	Nike / M5-E1	Aerobee AJ10-92	-
Aerobee 200A	Nike / M5-E1	Aerobee AJ10-92	-
Aerobee 300	Aerojet X103C10	Aerobee 150	Sparrow
Aerobee 300A	Aerojet X103C10	Aerobee 150A	Sparrow
