= Deacon (rocket) =

American sounding rocket

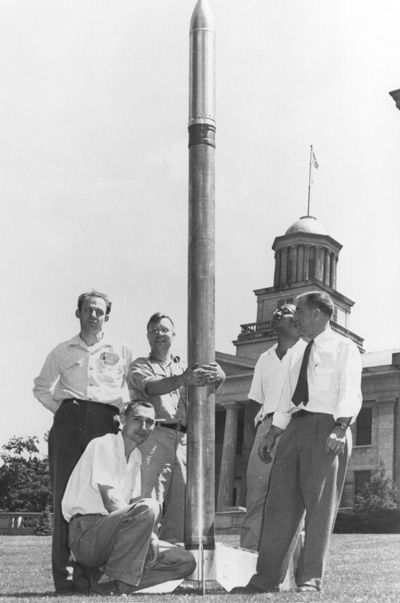
Deacon rocket with scientists (1952)

Deacon is the designation of an American sounding rocket. The Deacon was launched 90 times from 1947 to 1957 from Wallops Island, and it also was the rocket portion of the first rockoons, launched 1952 to 1956. The Deacon has a maximum flight height of 20 kilometers and a payload ability of 17 kilograms. The takeoff thrust of the Deacon amounts to 27 kN, the takeoff weight 93 kg, the diameter 0.16 m and the length 3.28 m.

== Triple Deacon ==
The Triple Deacon was a single stage member of the Deacon family that used three Deacon booster motors. Five launches from NASA's Wallops Flight Facility occurred in 1953.
