= Project Orbiter =

Early US plan to put a satellite in orbit

Project Orbiter was a proposed United States spacecraft, an early competitor to Project Vanguard. It was jointly run by the United States Army and United States Navy. It was ultimately rejected by the Ad Hoc Committee on Special Capabilities, which selected Project Vanguard instead. Although the project was canceled on 3 August 1955, the basic design was used for the Juno I rocket which launched Explorer 1, the first satellite launched by the United States.

== Proposal ==
In the 1920s and 1930s, the German Society for Space Travel (Verein für Raumschiffahrt, referred to as VfR by its founders) began to gain in popularity, with membership growing from outside of Germany as well as within. The primary cause for the VfR's gaining worldwide appeal was due to the writings of mathematician Hermann Oberth who detailed, in a 1923 publication entitled The Rocket into Interplanetary Space, the mechanics of placing a satellite into Earth orbit.

Herman Potočnik was the first to publish the concept of placing a geosynchronous satellite in geostationary orbit, in 1928. Arthur C. Clarke popularized this concept even further in 1945, in a paper entitled "Extra-Terrestrial Relays — Can Rocket Stations Give Worldwide Radio Coverage?", published in Wireless World magazine. Clarke described the concept as useful for communications satellites.

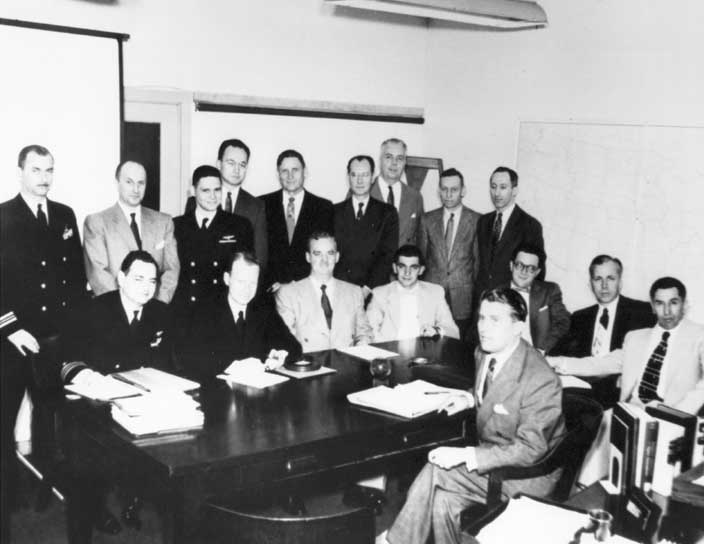
Project Orbiter committee, 17 March 1954

In 1954, Wernher von Braun proposed the idea of placing a satellite into orbit at a meeting of Spaceflight committee of the American Rocket Society. His plan was to use a Redstone rocket with clusters of small solid-fuel rockets on top.

Also in 1954, in a private discussion about the Redstone project with Ernst Stuhlinger, von Braun expressed his belief that they should have a "real, honest-to-goodness scientist" involved in their little unofficial satellite project (Project Orbiter). "I'm sure you know a scientist somewhere who would fill the bill, possibly in the Nobel Prize class, willing to work with us and to put some instruments on our satellite". Stuhlinger, himself a cosmic ray researcher at the University of Tübingen under his faculty advisor, Hans Geiger, had worked with James Van Allen at White Sands Missile Range with V-2 rockets, was ready with his reply: "Yes, of course, I will talk to Dr. Van Allen".

Stuhlinger followed this by a visit with Van Allen at his home in Princeton, New Jersey, where Van Allen was on sabbatical leave from University of Iowa to work on stellarator design. Van Allen later recounted, "Stuhlinger's 1954 message was simple and eloquent. By virtue of ballistic missile developments at Army Ballistic Missile Agency (ABMA), it was realistic to expect that within a year or two a small scientific satellite could be propelled into a durable orbit around the Earth.[sic] ... I expressed a keen interest in performing a worldwide survey of the cosmic-ray intensity above the atmosphere".

On 26 January 1956 at the Symposium on "The Scientific Uses of Earth Satellites" at the University of Michigan, sponsored by the Upper Atmosphere Research Panel, James Van Allen proposed the use of U.S. satellites for cosmic-ray investigations. Ernst Stuhlinger, from von Braun's team noted this presentation and stayed in contact with Van Allen's Iowa Group. Through "preparedness and good fortune", van Allen later wrote, the experiment was selected as the principal payload (Explorer 1) for the first flight of a four-stage Juno I rocket on 1 February 1958 (GMT).
