= 1951 in spaceflight =

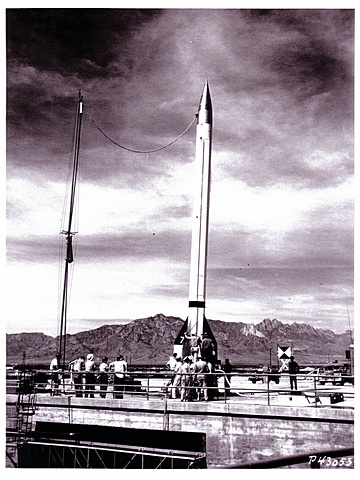
- Viking 7 before its 7 August 1951 launch

Rockets
- Maiden flights: (United States) Aerobee RTV-A-1a (United States) Aerobee RTV-A-1b (Soviet Union) R-1B (Soviet Union) R-1V
- Retirements: (United States) Viking (first model) (United States) Aerobee RTV-A-1b (Soviet Union) R-1B (Soviet Union) R-1V

1951 in spaceflight

The year 1951 saw extensive exploration of space by the United States and the Soviet Union (USSR) using suborbital rockets. The Soviets launched their first series of biomedical tests to the 100-kilometre (62 mi) boundary of space (as defined by the World Air Sports Federation). Several American agencies launched more than a dozen scientific sounding rocket flights between them. The US Navy launched its Viking sounding rocket for the seventh time since 1949, this time to a record-breaking 136 miles (219 km) in August 1951.

Development also continued by both superpowers on rockets more powerful than the World War Two era German V-2 that had inaugurated the age of spaceflight. The USSR advanced far beyond their R-1 (a V-2 copy) with the deployment of the R-2 rocket, which could carry a ton of explosives twice as far as its predecessor. Though the ambitious R-3 Intermediate Range Ballistic Missile was canceled in 1951, the more achievable R-5 missile project was initiated. Both the US Air Force and the US Army initiated their first post-V-2 ballistic missile projects, Atlas for the former and Redstone for the latter.

== Space exploration ==
Soviet R-1 missile

=== United States ===
The US Army, US Air Force, and the Applied Physics Laboratory continued their use of Aerobee on a variety of physics, aeronomy, photography, weather, and biomedical sounding rocket flights; a total of 11 were launched during the year. Two of these comprised the earliest space biomedical missions. Launched by the Air Force, and carrying mice and monkeys, they (along with a third flight in 1952) determined that brief (approx. 15 minutes) exposure to acceleration, reduced gravity, and high altitude cosmic radiation did not have significant negative effects.

The first generation of US Navy-built Viking sounding rockets reached its acme of performance with the flight of Viking 7, the sole Viking launch of 1951. Launched 7 August from White Sands Missile Range in New Mexico, the rocket set a new world altitude record of 136 miles (219 km).

=== Soviet Union ===
The R-1, the Soviet Union's first domestically built long-range ballistic missile, was accepted into service in November 1950. In January 1951, cold-weather testing of the R-1 for quality assurance purposes was conducted. On 1 June, production of the R-1 was centralized and transferred to a former automobile factory in Dnepropetrovsk, and that month, a test series of R-1s was successfully launched to the edge of space, all landing within 5.5 kilometres (3.4 mi) of their targets. Though the R-1, a virtual copy of the now-obsolete V-2, was not a particularly formidable weapon and posed virtually no threat to the West, it was invaluable in training engineers and missile crews, as well as creating a nascent rocket industry in the Soviet Union.

On 29 January 1951, dogs were carried on one of the winter test flights of the R-1. This was followed in the summer by six R-1s specifically designed and equipped for biomedical flights to determine if their payload dogs could survive the rigors of space travel and be recovered. Three of the missions were successful. On July 22, 1951, Dezik and Tsygan became the first Soviet space dogs to be launched into sub-orbital spaceflight.

The R-2 missile, the first operational Soviet design to have a separable nose cone, underwent a second test series of thirteen flights in July 1951, experiencing one failure. Accepted for operational service on 27 November 1951, the design had a range of 600 kilometres (370 mi), twice that of the R-1, while maintaining a similar payload of around 1,000 kilograms (2,200 lb).

== Spacecraft development ==
=== US Air Force ===
By 1950, the war-head carrying ballistic missile, which in the United States had been eclipsed since World War II by guided missile development, received national priority. In January 1951, the US Air Force's Air Research and Development Command awarded to Consolidated Vultee the contract for Atlas, the nation's first Intercontinental ballistic missile. The Atlas went on to become one of the key boosters in America's crewed and robotic space programs, first orbiting a payload (SCORE) in 1958.

=== US Army ===
On 15 April 1950, Wernher von Braun and his team of German rocket engineers were transferred from Fort Bliss to Redstone Arsenal in Alabama. In 1951, the Redstone team was tasked with researching and developing guided missiles and developing and testing free rockets, solid propellants, Jet-Assisted Take-off rockets, and related items, thus making the Army a leading player in America's missile development. Their work led to the production of the Redstone missile, first launched in 1953, versions of which ultimately launched Explorer 1, America's first artificial satellite, in 1958, and Mercury-Redstone 3, America's first human space mission, in 1961.

=== US Navy ===
In the summer of 1950, the United States Naval Research Laboratory (NRL) team led by Milton Rosen began work on an improved Viking rocket able to reach higher altitudes. The team would achieve increased performance through larger fuel tanks and reduced weight elsewhere on the rocket. Originally planned for launch in 1951, the development of the second generation Viking took two years, and the first of the new rockets would not launch until 6 June 1952.

=== University of Iowa ===
In January 1951, Dr. James Van Allen, instrumental in the development of the Aerobee rocket, joined the physics department at the State University of Iowa (SUI). Along with University of Chicago graduate Melvin B. Gottlieb and Van Allen's first SUI graduate student, Leslie H. Meredith, they began a high altitude cosmic ray research program using equipment mounted on balloons. Launched from 16 June 1951, through 26 January 1952, this experience set the foundation for balloon-launched sounding rockets, which would first breach the boundary of space in 1954.

=== Soviet Union ===
From 1947, G-1 (or R-10) missile, designed by German specialists brought to the USSR in 1945 to work on missile projects, competed with the Soviet-designed R-2 for limited engineering and production staff, the latter winning out by the end of 1949. With the project stalled for a lack of resources and government interest, the Soviets terminated all work by the German specialists in October 1950. In December 1951, the first of these Germans were repatriated to East Germany (a process that the Soviets completed in November 1953).

The draft plan for the ambitious 3,000-kilometre (1,900 mi) range R-3 had been approved on 7 December 1949, but was canceled on 20 October 1951, other designs proving more useful and achievable. One of them was the R-5 missile, able to carry the same payload as the R-1 and R-2 but over a distance of 1,200 kilometres (750 mi) (the other being the R-11, a tactical missile half the size of the R-1 but with the same payload). The R-5's conceptual design was completed by 30 October 1951.

== Launches ==
- ← Jan
- Feb
- Mar
- Apr
- May
- Jun
- Jul
- Aug
- Sep
- Oct
- Nov
- Dec →

=== January ===
January launches
Date and time (UTC)	Rocket	Flight number	Launch site		LSP	
Date and time (UTC)	Payload	Operator	Orbit	Function	Decay (UTC)	Outcome
Date and time (UTC)	Remarks					
18 January; 20:14	(Nazi Germany) V-2	V-2 No. 54	(United States) White Sands LC-33		(United States) GE / US Army	
18 January; 20:14		NRL	Suborbital	Cosmic Radiation / Solar UV / Solar X-Ray	18 January	Launch failure
18 January; 20:14	Project Hermes launch, Apogee: 1.61 kilometres (1.00 mi), very low thrust					
22 January; 22:55	(United States) Aerobee RTV-N-10	A19	(United States) White Sands LC-35		(United States) US Navy	
22 January; 22:55		APL	Suborbital	Aeronomy	22 January	Successful
22 January; 22:55	Apogee: 89 kilometres (55 mi)					
25 January; 15:00	(United States) Aerobee RTV-N-10	A20	(United States) White Sands LC-35		(United States) US Navy	
25 January; 15:00		APL	Suborbital	Ozone Aeronomy	25 January	Successful
25 January; 15:00	Apogee: 90 kilometres (56 mi)					
29 January	(Soviet Union) R-1		(Soviet Union) Kapustin Yar		(Soviet Union) OKB-1	
29 January		OKB-1	Suborbital	Missile test	29 January	Successful
29 January	Carried dogs					
30 January	(Soviet Union) R-1		(Soviet Union) Kapustin Yar		(Soviet Union) OKB-1	
30 January		OKB-1	Suborbital	Missile test	30 January	Successful
31 January	(Soviet Union) R-1		(Soviet Union) Kapustin Yar		(Soviet Union) OKB-1	
31 January		OKB-1	Suborbital	Missile test	31 January	Successful

=== February ===
February launches
Date and time (UTC)	Rocket	Flight number	Launch site		LSP	
Date and time (UTC)	Payload	Operator	Orbit	Function	Decay (UTC)	Outcome
Date and time (UTC)	Remarks					
1 February	(Soviet Union) R-1		(Soviet Union) Kapustin Yar		(Soviet Union) OKB-1	
1 February		OKB-1	Suborbital	Missile test	1 February	Successful
2 February	(Soviet Union) R-1		(Soviet Union) Kapustin Yar		(Soviet Union) OKB-1	
2 February		OKB-1	Suborbital	Missile test	2 February	Successful
6 February; 17:20	(United States) Aerobee RTV-N-10	A21	(United States) White Sands LC-35		(United States) US Navy	
6 February; 17:20		APL	Suborbital	Photography	6 February	Successful
6 February; 17:20	Apogee: 98 kilometres (61 mi)					

=== March ===
March launches
Date and time (UTC)	Rocket	Flight number	Launch site		LSP	
Date and time (UTC)	Payload	Operator	Orbit	Function	Decay (UTC)	Outcome
Date and time (UTC)	Remarks					
9 March; 03:16	(Nazi Germany) V-2	V-2 No. 57	(United States) White Sands LC-33		(United States) GE / US Army	
9 March; 03:16	(United States) Blossom IVE	Air Materiel Command	Suborbital	Solar X-Ray / Aeronomy / Ionospheric / Airglow	9 March	Launch failure
9 March; 03:16	Project Hermes launch, apogee: 3.1 kilometres (1.9 mi), explosions starting at 15.5 seconds destroyed the tail section					
28 March; 23:14	(United States) Aerobee RTV-A-1	USAF 10	(United States) Holloman LC-A		(United States) US Air Force	
28 March; 23:14		AFCRL	Suborbital	Aeronomy	28 March	Successful
28 March; 23:14	Apogee: 66 kilometres (41 mi)					

=== April ===
April launches
Date and time (UTC)	Rocket	Flight number	Launch site		LSP	
Date and time (UTC)	Payload	Operator	Orbit	Function	Decay (UTC)	Outcome
Date and time (UTC)	Remarks					
12 April; 17:26	(United States) Aerobee RTV-A-1	USAF 11	(United States) Holloman LC-A		(United States) US Air Force	
12 April; 17:26		AFCRL / University of Colorado	Suborbital	Solar UV	12 April	Partial failure
12 April; 17:26	Apogee: 29 kilometres (18 mi), premature engine cutoff at 30.6 seconds					
18 April; 18:39	(United States) Aerobee RTV-A-1	USAF 12	(United States) Holloman LC-A		(United States) US Air Force	
18 April; 18:39	(United States) Aeromed 1	AFCRL / WADC Aero-Medical Laboratory	Suborbital	Biological	18 April	Successful
18 April; 18:39	First biomedical Aerobee mission, carried monkey; apogee: 61 kilometres (38 mi)					

=== May ===
May launches
Date and time (UTC)	Rocket	Flight number	Launch site		LSP	
Date and time (UTC)	Payload	Operator	Orbit	Function	Decay (UTC)	Outcome
Date and time (UTC)	Remarks					
29 May; 19:46	(United States) Aerobee RTV-A-1	USAF 13	(United States) Holloman LC-A		(United States) US Air Force	
29 May; 19:46		AFCRL / Boston University	Suborbital	Ionospheric	29 May	Launch failure
29 May; 19:46	Apogee: 3.7 kilometres (2.3 mi)					

=== June ===
June launches
Date and time (UTC)	Rocket	Flight number	Launch site		LSP	
Date and time (UTC)	Payload	Operator	Orbit	Function	Decay (UTC)	Outcome
Date and time (UTC)	Remarks					
8 June; 00:11	(United States) Aerobee RTV-A-1	USAF 14	(United States) Holloman LC-A		(United States) US Air Force	
8 June; 00:11		AFCRL	Suborbital	Solar X-Ray / Aeronomy	8 June	Successful
8 June; 00:11	Apogee: 89 kilometres (55 mi)					
8 June; 01:18	(United States) Aerobee XASR-SC-1	SC 19	(United States) White Sands LC-35		(United States) US Army	
8 June; 01:18		USASC / University of Michigan	Suborbital	Aeronomy	8 June	Launch failure
8 June; 01:18	Apogee: 6.4 kilometres (4.0 mi), full burn but very low thrust					
9 June; 06:11	(United States) Aerobee XASR-SC-1	SC 18	(United States) White Sands LC-35		(United States) US Army	
9 June; 06:11	(United States) Grenades	USASC	Suborbital	Aeronomy	9 June	Successful
9 June; 06:11	Apogee: 66.8 kilometres (41.5 mi)					
13 June	(Soviet Union) R-1		(Soviet Union) Kapustin Yar		(Soviet Union) OKB-1	
13 June		OKB-1	Suborbital	Missile test	13 June	Successful
14 June; 13:48	(Nazi Germany) V-2	V-2 No. 55	(United States) White Sands LC-33		(United States) GE / US Army	
14 June; 13:48		NRL	Suborbital	Cosmic Radiation / Solar UV / Solar X-Ray	14 June	Launch failure
14 June; 13:48	Project Hermes launch, apogee: 0 kilometres (0 mi), rocket exploded at ignition					
14 June	(Soviet Union) R-1		(Soviet Union) Kapustin Yar		(Soviet Union) OKB-1	
14 June		OKB-1	Suborbital	Missile test	14 June	Successful
18 June	(Soviet Union) R-1		(Soviet Union) Kapustin Yar		(Soviet Union) OKB-1	
18 June		OKB-1	Suborbital	Missile test	18 June	Successful
19 June	(Soviet Union) R-1		(Soviet Union) Kapustin Yar		(Soviet Union) OKB-1	
19 June		OKB-1	Suborbital	Missile test	19 June	Successful
20 June	(Soviet Union) R-1		(Soviet Union) Kapustin Yar		(Soviet Union) OKB-1	
20 June		OKB-1	Suborbital	Missile test	20 June	Successful
22 June	(Soviet Union) R-1		(Soviet Union) Kapustin Yar		(Soviet Union) OKB-1	
22 June		OKB-1	Suborbital	Missile test	22 June	Successful
23 June	(Soviet Union) R-1		(Soviet Union) Kapustin Yar		(Soviet Union) OKB-1	
23 June		OKB-1	Suborbital	Missile test	23 June	Successful
24 June	(Soviet Union) R-1		(Soviet Union) Kapustin Yar		(Soviet Union) OKB-1	
24 June		OKB-1	Suborbital	Missile test	24 June	Successful
25 June	(Soviet Union) R-1		(Soviet Union) Kapustin Yar		(Soviet Union) OKB-1	
25 June		OKB-1	Suborbital	Missile test	25 June	Successful
26 June	(Soviet Union) R-1		(Soviet Union) Kapustin Yar		(Soviet Union) OKB-1	
26 June		OKB-1	Suborbital	Missile test	26 June	Successful
27 June	(Soviet Union) R-1		(Soviet Union) Kapustin Yar		(Soviet Union) OKB-1	
27 June		OKB-1	Suborbital	Missile test	27 June	Successful
28 June; 21:43	(Nazi Germany) V-2	V-2 No. 52	(United States) White Sands LC-33		(United States) GE / US Army	
28 June; 21:43	(United States) Blossom IVF	Air Materiel Command	Suborbital	Solar UV / Solar X-Ray / Ionospheric / Photography / Aeronomy / Biological	28 June	Launch failure
28 June; 21:43	Final project Hermes launch, apogee: 5.8 kilometres (3.6 mi), explosion in tail section at 8 seconds, cutoff triggered at 22 seconds					

=== July ===
July launches
Date and time (UTC)	Rocket	Flight number	Launch site		LSP	
Date and time (UTC)	Payload	Operator	Orbit	Function	Decay (UTC)	Outcome
Date and time (UTC)	Remarks					
2 July	(Soviet Union) R-2		(Soviet Union) Kapustin Yar		(Soviet Union) OKB-1	
2 July		OKB-1	Suborbital	Missile test	2 July	
2 July	First of thirteen launches, 12 of which hit the target area.					
July	(Soviet Union) R-2		(Soviet Union) Kapustin Yar		(Soviet Union) OKB-1	
July		OKB-1	Suborbital	Missile test	Same day	
July	Second of thirteen launches, 12 of which hit the target area.					
July	(Soviet Union) R-2		(Soviet Union) Kapustin Yar		(Soviet Union) OKB-1	
July		OKB-1	Suborbital	Missile test	Same day	
July	Third of thirteen launches, 12 of which hit the target area.					
July	(Soviet Union) R-2		(Soviet Union) Kapustin Yar		(Soviet Union) OKB-1	
July		OKB-1	Suborbital	Missile test	Same day	
July	Fourth of thirteen launches, 12 of which hit the target area.					
July	(Soviet Union) R-2		(Soviet Union) Kapustin Yar		(Soviet Union) OKB-1	
July		OKB-1	Suborbital	Missile test	Same day	
July	Fifth of thirteen launches, 12 of which hit the target area.					
July	(Soviet Union) R-2		(Soviet Union) Kapustin Yar		(Soviet Union) OKB-1	
July		OKB-1	Suborbital	Missile test	Same day	
July	Sixth of thirteen launches, 12 of which hit the target area.					
July	(Soviet Union) R-2		(Soviet Union) Kapustin Yar		(Soviet Union) OKB-1	
July		OKB-1	Suborbital	Missile test	Same day	
July	Seventh of thirteen launches, 12 of which hit the target area.					
July	(Soviet Union) R-2		(Soviet Union) Kapustin Yar		(Soviet Union) OKB-1	
July		OKB-1	Suborbital	Missile test	Same day	
July	Eighth of thirteen launches, 12 of which hit the target area.					
July	(Soviet Union) R-2		(Soviet Union) Kapustin Yar		(Soviet Union) OKB-1	
July		OKB-1	Suborbital	Missile test	Same day	
July	Ninth of thirteen launches, 12 of which hit the target area.					
July	(Soviet Union) R-2		(Soviet Union) Kapustin Yar		(Soviet Union) OKB-1	
July		OKB-1	Suborbital	Missile test	Same day	
July	Tenth of thirteen launches, 12 of which hit the target area.					
July	(Soviet Union) R-2		(Soviet Union) Kapustin Yar		(Soviet Union) OKB-1	
July		OKB-1	Suborbital	Missile test	Same day	
July	Eleventh of thirteen launches, 12 of which hit the target area.					
July	(Soviet Union) R-2		(Soviet Union) Kapustin Yar		(Soviet Union) OKB-1	
July		OKB-1	Suborbital	Missile test	Same day	
July	Twelfth of thirteen launches, 12 of which hit the target area.					
22 July	(Soviet Union) R-1V		(Soviet Union) Kapustin Yar		(Soviet Union) OKB-1	
22 July		OKB-1	Suborbital	Biological	22 July	Successful
22 July	Maiden flight of the R-1V; first ever space dog mission carried dogs Dezik and Zhegan which were recovered.					
25 July; 16:26	(United States) Aerobee RTV-A-1	USAF 15	(United States) Holloman LC-A		(United States) US Air Force	
25 July; 16:26		AFCRC	Suborbital	Sky Brightness	25 July	Successful
25 July; 16:26	Apogee: 71.3 kilometres (44.3 mi)					
27 July	(Soviet Union) R-2		(Soviet Union) Kapustin Yar		(Soviet Union) OKB-1	
27 July		OKB-1	Suborbital	Missile test	27 July	
27 July	Last of thirteen launches, 12 of which hit the target area.					
29 July	(Soviet Union) R-1B		(Soviet Union) Kapustin Yar		(Soviet Union) OKB-1	
29 July		OKB-1	Suborbital	Biological	29 July	Launch failure
29 July	Maiden flight of the R-1B; electrical failure, no payload recovery; carried dogs did not survive					

=== August ===
August launches
Date and time (UTC)	Rocket	Flight number	Launch site		LSP	
Date and time (UTC)	Payload	Operator	Orbit	Function	Decay (UTC)	Outcome
Date and time (UTC)	Remarks					
7 August; 16:36	(United States) Aerobee RTV-A-1	USAF 16	(United States) Holloman LC-A		(United States) US Air Force	
7 August; 16:36		AFCRC / Boston University	Suborbital	Ionospheric	7 August	Successful
7 August; 16:36	Apogee: 83.5 kilometres (51.9 mi)					
7 August; 18:00	(United States) Viking (first model)		(United States) White Sands LC-33 – Army Launch Area 1		(United States) US Navy	
7 August; 18:00	(United States) Viking 7	NRL	Suborbital	Cosmic Radiation / Solar X-Ray / Aeronomy	7 August	Successful
7 August; 18:00	Final flight of the first model Viking, apogee: 219 kilometres (136 mi)					
15 August	(Soviet Union) R-1B		(Soviet Union) Kapustin Yar		(Soviet Union) OKB-1	
15 August		OKB-1	Suborbital	Solar UV / Biological	15 August	Successful
15 August	Carried dogs, recovered					
19 August	(Soviet Union) R-1V		(Soviet Union) Kapustin Yar		(Soviet Union) OKB-1	
19 August		OKB-1	Suborbital	Biological	19 August	Successful
19 August	Final flight of the R-1V; carried dogs, recovered					
22 August; 19:00	(Nazi Germany) V-2	TF-1	(United States) White Sands LC-33		(United States) US Army	
22 August; 19:00		US Army	Suborbital	Altitude test	22 August	Successful
22 August; 19:00	First all Army team after General Electric's contract concluded; apogee: 213.4 kilometres (132.6 mi)					
28 August	(Soviet Union) R-1B		(Soviet Union) Kapustin Yar		(Soviet Union) OKB-1	
28 August		OKB-1	Suborbital	Biological	28 August	Successful
30 August; 22:40	(United States) Aerobee RTV-A-1b	USAF 17	(United States) Holloman LC-A		(United States) US Air Force	
30 August; 22:40		AFCRC	Suborbital	Rocket test	30 August	Successful
30 August; 22:40	Maiden (and only) flight of the RTV-A-1b, apogee: 76 kilometres (47 mi)					

=== September ===
September launches
Date and time (UTC)	Rocket	Flight number	Launch site		LSP	
Date and time (UTC)	Payload	Operator	Orbit	Function	Decay (UTC)	Outcome
Date and time (UTC)	Remarks					
3 September	(Soviet Union) R-1B		(Soviet Union) Kapustin Yar		(Soviet Union) OKB-1	
3 September		OKB-1	Suborbital	Biological	3 September	Successful
3 September	Final flight of the R-1B; carried dogs, recovered					
13 September; 11:37	(United States) Aerobee RTV-A-1	USAF 18	(United States) Holloman LC-A		(United States) US Air Force	
13 September; 11:37		AFCRC / University of Michigan	Suborbital	Aeronomy	13 September	Successful
13 September; 11:37	Apogee: 76 kilometres (47 mi)					
20 September; 16:31	(United States) Aerobee RTV-A-1	USAF 19	(United States) Holloman LC-A		(United States) US Air Force	
20 September; 16:31	(United States) Aeromed 2	AFCRC / WADC Aero-Medical Laboratory	Suborbital	Biological	20 September	Successful
20 September; 16:31	Carried monkey, Yorick/Albert VI, and 11 mice, all recovered; apogee: 71 kilometres (44 mi)					
27 September; 00:06	(United States) Aerobee XASR-SC-1	SC 21	(United States) White Sands LC-35		(United States) US Army	
27 September; 00:06		USASC / University of Michigan	Suborbital	Aeronomy	27 September	Successful
27 September; 00:06	Apogee: 68.9 kilometres (42.8 mi)					

=== October ===
October launches
Date and time (UTC)	Rocket	Flight number	Launch site		LSP	
Date and time (UTC)	Payload	Operator	Orbit	Function	Decay (UTC)	Outcome
Date and time (UTC)	Remarks					
17 October; 18:17	(United States) Aerobee RTV-A-1a	USAF 20	(United States) Holloman LC-A		(United States) US Air Force	
17 October; 18:17		AFCRC / Boston University	Suborbital	Ionospheric	17 October	Successful
17 October; 18:17	Apogee: 114.3 kilometres (71.0 mi), maiden flight of the RTV-A-1a					
29 October; 21:04	(Nazi Germany) V-2	V-2 No. 60	(United States) White Sands LC-33		(United States) US Army	
29 October; 21:04		USASC / University of Michigan	Suborbital	Aeronomy	29 October	Successful
29 October; 21:04	Apogee: 141.0 kilometres (87.6 mi)					

=== November ===
November launches
Date and time (UTC)	Rocket	Flight number	Launch site		LSP	
Date and time (UTC)	Payload	Operator	Orbit	Function	Decay (UTC)	Outcome
Date and time (UTC)	Remarks					
1 November; 09:46	(United States) Aerobee XASR-SC-1	SC 20	(United States) White Sands LC-35		(United States) US Army	
1 November; 09:46	(United States) Grenades	USASC	Suborbital	Aeronomy	1 November	Successful
1 November; 09:46	Apogee: 66.3 kilometres (41.2 mi)					
3 November; 00:35	(United States) Aerobee XASR-SC-1	SC 22	(United States) White Sands LC-35		(United States) US Army	
3 November; 00:35	(United States) Grenades	USASC	Suborbital	Aeronomy	3 November	Successful
3 November; 00:35	Apogee: 82 kilometres (51 mi)					

- ← Jan
- Feb
- Mar
- Apr
- May
- Jun
- Jul
- Aug
- Sep
- Oct
- Nov
- Dec →

== Suborbital launch statistics ==
=== By country ===
Launches by country
Country	Launches	Successes	Failures	Partial failures
Soviet Union	26	19	6	1
United States	35	33	1	1
World	61	52	7	2

=== By rocket ===
- V-2 (American)
- Viking (first model)
- Aerobee RTV-N-10
- Aerobee XASR-SC-1
- Aerobee RTV-A-1
- Aerobee RTV-A-1b
- Aerobee RTV-A-1a
- R-1
- R-1V
- R-1B
- R-2

Launches by rocket
Rocket	Country	Launches	Successes	Failures	Partial failures	Remarks
V-2	United States	6	2	4	0	
Viking (first model)	United States	1	1	0	0	Retired
Aerobee RTV-N-10	United States	3	3	0	0	
Aerobee XASR-SC-1	United States	5	4	1	0	
Aerobee RTV-A-1	United States	9	7	1	1	
Aerobee RTV-A-1b	United States	1	1	0	0	Maiden flight, retired
Aerobee RTV-A-1a	United States	1	1	0	0	Maiden flight
R-1	Soviet Union	16	16	0	0	
R-1V	Soviet Union	2	2	0	0	Maiden flight, retired
R-1B	Soviet Union	4	3	1	0	Maiden flight, retired
R-2	Soviet Union	13	12	0	1	

== See also ==
- Timeline of spaceflight
