= 1953 in spaceflight =

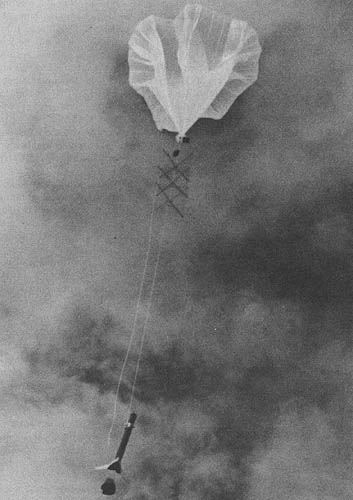
- Launch of a Deacon Rockoon; several such launches occurred in 1953

Rockets
- Maiden flights: (Soviet Union) R-5 Pobeda
- Retirements: (United States) Aerobee XASR-SC-2

1953 in spaceflight

The year 1953 saw the rockoon join the stable of sounding rockets capable of reaching beyond the 100 kilometres (62 mi) boundary of space (as defined by the World Air Sports Federation). Employed by both the University of Iowa and the Naval Research Laboratory, 22 total were launched from the decks of the USS Staten Island and the USCGC Eastwind this year. All branches of the United States military continued their program of Aerobee sounding rocket launches, a total of 23 were launched throughout 1953. The Soviet Union launched no sounding rockets in 1953; however, the Soviet Union did conduct several series of missile test launches.

Both the United States and the Union of Soviet Socialist Republics continued their development of ballistic missiles: the United States Air Force with its Atlas ICBM, the United States Army with its Redstone SRBM, the Soviet OKB-1 with its R-5 IRBM, and Soviet Factory 586 with its R-12 IRBM. None entered active service during 1953.

The first meeting of the Comité Speciale de l'Année Géophysique Internationale (CSAGI), a special committee of the International Council of Scientific Unions (ICSU), began preliminary coordination of the International Geophysical Year (IGY), scheduled for 1957–58.

== Space exploration highlights ==
=== US Navy ===
On 25 May 1953, Viking 10, originally planned to be the last of the Naval Research Laboratory-built Viking rockets, arrived at White Sands Missile Range in New Mexico. A successful static firing on 18 June cleared the way for a 30 June launch date, a schedule that had been made months prior, before the rocket had even left the Glenn L. Martin Company plant where it had been built. At the moment of liftoff, the tail of Viking 10 exploded, setting the rocket afire. Water was immediately flooded into the rocket's base in an attempt to extinguish the fire, but flames continued to burn in the East Quadrant of the firing platform. Half an hour after launch, two of the launch team under manager Milton Rosen were dispatched to put out the fire to salvage what remained of the rocket.

Though successful, these efforts were then threatened by a slow leak in the propellant tank. The vacuum created by the departing fuel was causing the tank to dimple with the danger of implosion that would cause the rocket to collapse. Lieutenant Joseph Pitts, a member of the launch team, shot a rifle round into the tank, equalizing the pressure and saving the rocket. Three hours after the attempted launch, the last of the alcohol propellant had been drained from Viking 10. The launch team was able to salvage the instrument package of cameras, including X-ray detectors, cosmic ray emulsions, and a radio-frequency mass-spectrometer, valued at tens of thousands of dollars, although there was concern that the rocket was irreparable.

A thorough investigation of the explosion began in July, but a conclusive cause could not be determined. In a reported presented in September, Milton Rosen noted that a similar occurrence had not happened in more than 100 prior tests of the Viking motor. It was decided to rebuild Viking 10, and a program for closer monitoring of potential fail points was implemented for the next launch, scheduled for 1954.

=== American civilian efforts ===
After the successful field tests of balloon-launched rockets (rockoons) the previous year, a University of Iowa physics team embarked on a second rockoon expedition aboard the USS Staten Island in summer 1953 with improved equipment. The new Skyhook balloons increased the rocket firing altitude from 40,000 feet (12,000 m) to 50,000 feet (15,000 m) affording a peak rocket altitude of 57 miles (92 km). The total payload weights were increased by 2 pounds (0.91 kg) to 30 pounds (14 kg). Between 18 July and 4 September, the Iowa team launched 16 rockoons from a variety of latitudes, 7 of which reached useful altitudes and returned usable data. An NRL team aboard the same vessel launched six rockoons, of which half were complete successes. Data from these launches provided the first evidence of radiation associated with aurora borealis.

== Spacecraft development ==
=== US Air Force ===
Development of the Atlas, the nation's first ICBM proceeded slowly throughout 1953. Without firm figures as to the weight and dimension of a thermonuclear device (the US tested its first H-bomb in November 1952, the USSR announced their first successful test in August 1953), it was not known if the Atlas could deliver an atomic bomb payload.

In spring 1953, Colonel Bernard Schriever, an assistant in development planning at The Pentagon and a proponent of long-ranged ballistic missiles, pushed to obtain accurate characteristics of a nuclear payload. Trevor Gardner, special assistant for research and development to the new Secretary of the Air Force, Harold Talbott, responded by organizing the Strategic Missiles Evaluation Committee or "Teapot Committee" comprising eleven of the top scientists and engineers in the country. Their goal would be to determine if a nuclear payload could be made small enough to fit on the Atlas rocket. If so, the importance of the committee's members would allow such findings to accelerate Atlas development. By October, committee member John von Neumann had completed his report on weights and figures indicating that smaller, more powerful warheads within Atlas' launch capability would soon be available. Pending test verification of von Neumann's theoretical results, the Air Force began revising the Atlas design for the projected nuclear payload.

=== US Army ===
The first production Redstone, a surface-to-surface missile capable of delivering nuclear or conventional warheads to a range of 200 miles (320 km), was delivered on 27 July 1953. A Redstone R&D missile was flight tested on 20 August 1953.

=== Soviet Union ===
The R-5 missile, able to carry the same 1,000 kilograms (2,200 lb) payload as the R-1 and R-2 but over a distance of 1,200 kilometres (750 mi) underwent its first series of eight test launches from 15 March to 23 May 1953. After two failures, the third rocket, launched 2 April, marked the beginning of streak of success. Seven more missiles were launched between 30 October and December, all of which reached their targets. A final series of launches, designed to test modifications made in response to issues with the first series, was scheduled for mid-1954.

In his brief tenure as Director of NII-88, responsible for the production of all Soviet ballistic missiles, engineer Mikhail Yangel chafed professionally with OKB-1 (formerly NII-88 Section 3) Chief Designer, Sergei Korolev, whom he had previously reported to as Deputy Chief Designer of the bureau. To relieve this tension, on 4 October 1953, Yangel was demoted to NII-88 Chief Engineer and assigned responsibility for production of missiles at State Union Plant No. 586 in Dnepropetrovsk. This plant under, Vasiliy Budnik, had been tasked on 13 February 1953 with developing the R-12 missile, possessing a performance similar to that of the R-5 (range of 2,000 kilometres (1,200 mi) vs. 1,200 kilometres (750 mi)) but using storable propellants so that it could be stored at firing readiness for extended periods of time.

At the end of 1953, at a meeting of the Presidium of the Supreme Soviet, it was determined that a transportable thermonuclear device be developed (as opposed to the one detonated in August, which was stationary). It was further determined that an ICBM be developed to carry said bomb. As no ICBMs existed at the time, in reality or even in planning, development of a nuclear capable R-5 (dubbed the "R-5M") was ordered.

=== The International Geophysical Year ===
July 1953 saw the first meeting of the Comité Speciale de l'Année Géophysique Internationale (CSAGI), a special committee of the International Council of Scientific Unions (ICSU) tasked with coordinating the International Geophysical Year (IGY), set for 1957–58. This international effort would undertake simultaneous observations of geophysical phenomena over the entire surface of the Earth including such farflung regions as the Arctic and Antarctica. At its first meeting, CSAGI invited the world's nations to participate in the IGY. Response from most prominent nations was quick. The National Research Council of the US National Academy of Sciences set up a US National Committee for the IGY, with Joseph Kaplan serving as chairman and Hugh Odishaw as executive director. The only key nation slow in committing to the IGY was Soviet Union, which did not signal its involvement until spring 1955.

== Launches ==
- ← Jan
- Feb
- Mar
- Apr
- May
- Jun
- Jul
- Aug
- Sep
- Oct
- Nov
- Dec →

=== February ===
February launches
Date and time (UTC)	Rocket	Flight number	Launch site		LSP	
Date and time (UTC)	Payload	Operator	Orbit	Function	Decay (UTC)	Outcome
Date and time (UTC)	Remarks					
10 February; 21:09	(United States) Aerobee RTV-N-10	NRL 12	(United States) White Sands LC-35		(United States) US Navy	
10 February; 21:09		NRL	Suborbital	Aeronomy / Cosmic Radiation	10 February	Successful
10 February; 21:09	Apogee: 137.0 kilometres (85.1 mi)					
12 February; 07:09	(United States) Aerobee RTV-N-10	NRL 13	(United States) White Sands LC-35		(United States) US Navy	
12 February; 07:09		NRL	Suborbital	Aeronomy / Cosmic Radiation	12 February	Successful
12 February; 07:09	Apogee: 137.3 kilometres (85.3 mi)					
18 February; 06:50	(United States) Aerobee XASR-SC-2	SC 27	(United States) White Sands LC-35		(United States) US Army	
18 February; 06:50	(United States) Grenades	SCEL	Suborbital	Aeronomy	18 February	Successful
18 February; 06:50	Apogee: 108.6 kilometres (67.5 mi)					
18 February; 17:42	(United States) Aerobee RTV-A-1a	USAF 34	(United States) Holloman LC-A		(United States) US Air Force	
18 February; 17:42		AFCRC	Suborbital	Rocket performance test	18 February	Successful
18 February; 17:42	Apogee: 117 kilometres (73 mi)					

=== March ===
March launches
Date and time (UTC)	Rocket	Flight number	Launch site		LSP	
Date and time (UTC)	Payload	Operator	Orbit	Function	Decay (UTC)	Outcome
Date and time (UTC)	Remarks					
1 March	(Soviet Union) R-1		(Soviet Union) Kapustin Yar		(Soviet Union) OKB-1	
1 March		OKB-1	Suborbital	Missile test	1 March	Successful
5 March	(Soviet Union) R-1		(Soviet Union) Kapustin Yar		(Soviet Union) OKB-1	
5 March		OKB-1	Suborbital	Missile test	5 March	Successful
15 March	(Soviet Union) R-5		(Soviet Union) Kapustin Yar		(Soviet Union) OKB-1	
15 March		OKB-1	Suborbital	Missile test	15 March	Partial failure
15 March	Maiden flight of R-5					
18 March	(Soviet Union) R-5		(Soviet Union) Kapustin Yar		(Soviet Union) OKB-1	
18 March		OKB-1	Suborbital	Missile test	18 March	Partial failure
19 March	(Soviet Union) R-1		(Soviet Union) Kapustin Yar		(Soviet Union) OKB-1	
19 March		OKB-1	Suborbital	Missile test	19 March	Successful

=== April ===
April launches
Date and time (UTC)	Rocket	Flight number	Launch site		LSP	
Date and time (UTC)	Payload	Operator	Orbit	Function	Decay (UTC)	Outcome
Date and time (UTC)	Remarks					
2 April	(Soviet Union) R-5		(Soviet Union) Kapustin Yar		(Soviet Union) OKB-1	
2 April		OKB-1	Suborbital	Missile test	2 April	Successful
2 April	First successful R-5 launch					
8 April	(Soviet Union) R-5		(Soviet Union) Kapustin Yar		(Soviet Union) OKB-1	
8 April		OKB-1	Suborbital	Missile test	8 April	Partial failure
14 April; 15:47	(United States) Aerobee RTV-A-1a	USAF 35	(United States) Holloman LC-A		(United States) US Air Force	
14 April; 15:47		AFCRC	Suborbital	Rocket performance test	14 April	Successful
14 April; 15:47	Apogee: 122 kilometres (76 mi)					
19 April	(Soviet Union) R-5		(Soviet Union) Kapustin Yar		(Soviet Union) OKB-1	
19 April		OKB-1	Suborbital	Missile test	19 April	Successful
23 April; 19:33	(United States) Aerobee XASR-SC-2	SC 30	(United States) White Sands LC-35		(United States) US Army	
23 April; 19:33	(United States) Sphere	SCEL / University of Michigan	Suborbital	Aeronomy	23 April	Successful
23 April; 19:33	Apogee: 123.3 kilometres (76.6 mi)					
24 April; 10:19	(United States) Aerobee XASR-SC-2	SC 28	(United States) White Sands LC-35		(United States) US Army	
24 April; 10:19	(United States) Grenades	SCEL	Suborbital	Aeronomy	24 April	Successful
24 April; 10:19	Apogee: 108 kilometres (67 mi)					
24 April	(Soviet Union) R-5		(Soviet Union) Kapustin Yar		(Soviet Union) OKB-1	
24 April		OKB-1	Suborbital	Missile test	24 April	Partial failure

=== May ===
May launches
Date and time (UTC)	Rocket	Flight number	Launch site		LSP	
Date and time (UTC)	Payload	Operator	Orbit	Function	Decay (UTC)	Outcome
Date and time (UTC)	Remarks					
11 May	(Soviet Union) R-1		(Soviet Union) Kapustin Yar		(Soviet Union) OKB-1	
11 May		OKB-1	Suborbital	Missile test	11 May	Successful
13 May	(Soviet Union) R-5		(Soviet Union) Kapustin Yar		(Soviet Union) OKB-1	
13 May		OKB-1	Suborbital	Missile test	13 May	Successful
20 May; 14:04	(United States) Aerobee RTV-A-1a	USAF 36	(United States) Holloman LC-A		(United States) US Air Force	
20 May; 14:04	(United States) Airglow 3	AFCRC	Suborbital	Sky Brightness	20 May	Successful
20 May; 14:04	Apogee: 114 kilometres (71 mi)					
21 May; 15:57	(United States) Aerobee RTV-A-1a	USAF 37	(United States) Holloman LC-A		(United States) US Air Force	
21 May; 15:57	(United States) Airglow 4	AFCRC	Suborbital	Sky Brightness	21 May	Successful
21 May; 15:57	Apogee: 114 kilometres (71 mi)					
23 May	(Soviet Union) R-5		(Soviet Union) Kapustin Yar		(Soviet Union) OKB-1	
23 May		OKB-1	Suborbital	Missile test	23 May	Successful
23 May	Contained 4 supplementary combat compartments; end of 1st set of experimental launches					

=== June ===
June launches
Date and time (UTC)	Rocket	Flight number	Launch site		LSP	
Date and time (UTC)	Payload	Operator	Orbit	Function	Decay (UTC)	Outcome
Date and time (UTC)	Remarks					
26 June; 19:10	(United States) Aerobee RTV-A-1a	USAF 38	(United States) Holloman LC-A		(United States) US Air Force	
26 June; 19:10	(United States) Ionosphere 3	AFCRC / University of Utah	Suborbital	Ionospheric	26 June	Successful
26 June; 19:10	Apogee: 135 kilometres (84 mi)					
30 June	(United States) Viking (second model)		(United States) White Sands LC-33		(United States) US Navy	
30 June	(United States) Viking 10	NRL	Suborbital	Aeronomy / Ionospheric	30 June	Launch Failure
30 June	Apogee: 0 kilometres (0 mi), tail exploded on launch pad; rocket rebuilt and launched successfully on 7 May 1954					

=== July ===
July launches
Date and time (UTC)	Rocket	Flight number	Launch site		LSP	
Date and time (UTC)	Payload	Operator	Orbit	Function	Decay (UTC)	Outcome
Date and time (UTC)	Remarks					
1 July; 17:52	(United States) Aerobee RTV-A-1a	USAF 39	(United States) Holloman LC-A		(United States) US Air Force	
1 July; 17:52	(United States) Ionosphere 4	AFCRC / University of Utah	Suborbital	Ionospheric	1 July	Successful
1 July; 17:52	Apogee: 138 kilometres (86 mi)					
6 July	(Soviet Union) R-1		(Soviet Union) Kapustin Yar		(Soviet Union) OKB-1	
6 July		OKB-1	Suborbital	Missile test	6 July	Successful
14 July; 15:30	(United States) Aerobee RTV-A-1a	USAF 40	(United States) Holloman LC-A		(United States) US Air Force	
14 July; 15:30		AFCRC / University of Rhode Island	Suborbital	Solar UV	14 July	Successful
14 July; 15:30	Apogee: 103 kilometres (64 mi)					
18 July; 22:27	(United States) Deacon Rockoon	SUI 8	(United States) USS Staten Island, Atlantic Ocean, 50 kilometres (31 mi) east of Boston		(United States) US Navy	
18 July; 22:27		University of Iowa	Suborbital	Cosmic Radiation	18 July	Launch failure
18 July; 22:27	(Balloon) Apogee: 22.0 kilometres (13.7 mi), rocket failed to fire					
19 July; 10:30	(United States) Deacon Rockoon	SUI 9	(United States) USS Staten Island, Atlantic Ocean, near Nova Scotia		(United States) US Navy	
19 July; 10:30		University of Iowa	Suborbital	Cosmic Radiation	19 July	Launch failure
19 July; 10:30	(Balloon) Apogee: 22.2 kilometres (13.8 mi), rocket failed to fire					
19 July; 15:53	(United States) Deacon Rockoon	SUI 10	(United States) USS Staten Island, Atlantic Ocean, near Nova Scotia		(United States) US Navy	
19 July; 15:53		University of Iowa	Suborbital	Cosmic Radiation	19 July	Launch failure
19 July; 15:53	(Balloon) Apogee: 22.2 kilometres (13.8 mi), rocket failed to fire					
19 July; 21:57	(United States) Deacon Rockoon	SUI 11	(United States) USS Staten Island, Atlantic Ocean, near Nova Scotia		(United States) US Navy	
19 July; 21:57		University of Iowa	Suborbital	Cosmic Radiation	19 July	Launch failure
19 July; 21:57	(Balloon) Apogee: 23.2 kilometres (14.4 mi), rocket failed to fire					
22 July; 09:47	(United States) Aerobee RTV-A-1a	USAF 41	(United States) Holloman LC-A		(United States) US Air Force	
22 July; 09:47		AFCRC	Suborbital	Aeronomy	23 July	Successful
22 July; 09:47	Apogee: 95.6 kilometres (59.4 mi)					
24 July; 16:40	(United States) Deacon Rockoon	SUI 12	(United States) USS Staten Island, Labrador Sea		(United States) US Navy	
24 July; 16:40		University of Iowa	Suborbital	Cosmic Radiation	24 July	Launch failure
24 July; 16:40	Balloon cut down, rocket failed to fire					
28 July; 09:41	(United States) Deacon Rockoon	SUI 13	(United States) USS Staten Island, southern Davis Strait, near Baffin Island		(United States) US Navy	
28 July; 09:41		University of Iowa	Suborbital	Cosmic Radiation	28 July	Successful
28 July; 09:41	Apogee: 88.4 kilometres (54.9 mi)					

=== August ===
August launches
Date and time (UTC)	Rocket	Flight number	Launch site		LSP	
Date and time (UTC)	Payload	Operator	Orbit	Function	Decay (UTC)	Outcome
Date and time (UTC)	Remarks					
3 August; 18:28	(United States) Deacon Rockoon	SUI 14	(United States) USS Staten Island, Frobisher Bay		(United States) US Navy	
3 August; 18:28		University of Iowa	Suborbital	Cosmic Radiation	3 August	Successful
3 August; 18:28	Apogee uncertain					
5 August; 21:54	(United States) Deacon Rockoon	NRL Rockoon 1	(United States) USS Staten Island, southern Davis Strait, near Baffin Island		(United States) US Navy	
5 August; 21:54		NRL	Suborbital	Aeronomy	5 August	
5 August; 21:54	Apogee: 79.2 kilometres (49.2 mi); first of six 1953 NRL flights, three of which reached altitude and returned data					
6 August; 15:07	(United States) Deacon Rockoon	SUI 15	(United States) USS Staten Island, Davis Strait		(United States) US Navy	
6 August; 15:07		University of Iowa	Suborbital	Cosmic Radiation	6 August	Successful
6 August; 15:07	Apogee: 65.5 kilometres (40.7 mi)					
6 August; 18:40	(United States) Deacon Rockoon	SUI 16	(United States) USS Staten Island, Davis Strait		(United States) US Navy	
6 August; 18:40		University of Iowa	Suborbital	Cosmic Radiation	6 August	Successful
6 August; 18:40	Apogee uncertain					
8 August; 15:09	(United States) Deacon Rockoon	NRL Rockoon 2	(United States) USS Staten Island, Baffin Bay		(United States) US Navy	
8 August; 15:09		NRL	Suborbital	Aeronomy	8 August	
8 August; 15:09	Apogee uncertain; second of six 1953 NRL flights, three of which reached altitude and returned data					
9 August; 05:54	(United States) Deacon Rockoon	SUI 17	(United States) USS Staten Island, Baffin Bay		(United States) US Navy	
9 August; 05:54		University of Iowa	Suborbital	Cosmic Radiation	9 August	Successful
9 August; 05:54	Apogee: 99.1 kilometres (61.6 mi)					
9 August; 19:15	(United States) Deacon Rockoon	NRL Rockoon 3	(United States) USS Staten Island, Baffin Bay		(United States) US Navy	
9 August; 19:15		NRL	Suborbital	Aeronomy	9 August	Launch failure
9 August; 19:15	Apogee: 38.1 kilometres (23.7 mi); third of six 1953 NRL flights, three of which reached altitude and returned data					
11 August; 17:09	(United States) Deacon Rockoon	NRL Rockoon 4	(United States) USS Staten Island, Baffin Bay		(United States) US Navy	
11 August; 17:09		NRL	Suborbital	Aeronomy	11 August	
11 August; 17:09	Apogee: 80.8 kilometres (50.2 mi); fourth of six 1953 NRL flights, three of which reached altitude and returned data					
30 August; 14:00	(United States) Deacon Rockoon	SUI 18	(United States) USCGC Eastwind, Labrador Sea		(United States) US Coast Guard	
30 August; 14:00		University of Iowa	Suborbital	Cosmic Radiation	30 August	Launch failure
30 August; 14:00	(Balloon) Apogee: 13.4 kilometres (8.3 mi), rocket failed to fire					
30 August; 16:20	(United States) Deacon Rockoon	SUI 19	(United States) USCGC Eastwind, Labrador Sea		(United States) US Coast Guard	
30 August; 16:20		University of Iowa	Suborbital	Cosmic Radiation	30 August	Launch failure
30 August; 16:20	(Balloon) Apogee: 19.2 kilometres (11.9 mi), rocket failed to fire					
30 August; 20:46	(United States) Deacon Rockoon	SUI 20	(United States) USCGC Eastwind, Labrador Sea		(United States) US Coast Guard	
30 August; 20:46		University of Iowa	Suborbital	Cosmic Radiation	30 August	Successful
30 August; 20:46	Apogee: 103.6 kilometres (64.4 mi)					

=== September ===
September launches
Date and time (UTC)	Rocket	Flight number	Launch site		LSP	
Date and time (UTC)	Payload	Operator	Orbit	Function	Decay (UTC)	Outcome
Date and time (UTC)	Remarks					
1 September; 05:10	(United States) Aerobee XASR-SC-2	SC 32	(United States) White Sands LC-35		(United States) US Army	
1 September; 05:10	(United States) Grenades	SCEL	Suborbital	Aeronomy	1 September	Successful
1 September; 05:10	Apogee: 107.3 kilometres (66.7 mi), final flight of the Aerobee XASR-SC-2					
3 September; 09:50	(United States) Deacon Rockoon	SUI 21	(United States) USCGC Eastwind, Atlantic Ocean, east of Nova Scotia		(United States) US Coast Guard	
3 September; 09:50		University of Iowa	Suborbital	Cosmic Radiation	3 September	Successful
3 September; 09:50	Apogee uncertain					
3 September; 11:51	(United States) Deacon Rockoon	SUI 22	(United States) USCGC Eastwind, Atlantic Ocean, east of Nova Scotia		(United States) US Coast Guard	
3 September; 11:51		University of Iowa	Suborbital	Cosmic Radiation	3 September	Successful
3 September; 11:51	Apogee: 103.6 kilometres (64.4 mi)					
3 September; 14:05	(United States) Deacon Rockoon	SUI 23	(United States) USCGC Eastwind, Atlantic Ocean, east of Nova Scotia		(United States) US Coast Guard	
3 September; 14:05		University of Iowa	Suborbital	Cosmic Radiation	3 September	Successful
3 September; 14:05	Apogee: 99.1 kilometres (61.6 mi)					
4 September; 03:59	(United States) Deacon Rockoon	NRL Rockoon 5	(United States) USCGC Eastwind, Atlantic Ocean, east of Nova Scotia		(United States) US Coast Guard	
4 September; 03:59		NRL	Suborbital	Aeronomy	4 September	
4 September; 03:59	Apogee: 67.1 kilometres (41.7 mi); fifth of six 1953 NRL flights, three of which reached altitude and returned data					
4 September; 15:51	(United States) Deacon Rockoon	NRL Rockoon 6	(United States) USCGC Eastwind, Atlantic Ocean, near Nova Scotia		(United States) US Coast Guard	
4 September; 15:51		NRL	Suborbital	Aeronomy	4 September	Launch Failure
4 September; 15:51	(Balloon) Apogee: 13.7 kilometres (8.5 mi), rocket failed to fire; sixth of six 1953 NRL flights, three of which reached altitude and returned data					
5 September; 05:35	(United States) Aerobee XASR-SC-1	SC 33	(United States) White Sands LC-35		(United States) US Army	
5 September; 05:35	(United States) Grenades	SCEL	Suborbital	Aeronomy	5 September	Successful
5 September; 05:35	Apogee: 114 kilometres (71 mi)					
15 September; 15:02	(United States) Aerobee RTV-A-1a	USAF 42	(United States) Holloman LC-A		(United States) US Air Force	
15 September; 15:02	(United States) Airglow 5	AFCRC	Suborbital	Sky Brightness	15 September	Launch failure
15 September; 15:02	Apogee: 32 kilometres (20 mi), early cut-off due to a thrust chamber burn-through					
29 September; 20:50	(United States) Aerobee RTV-A-1a	SC 31	(United States) White Sands LC-35		(United States) US Army	
29 September; 20:50	(United States) Sphere	SCEL / University of Michigan	Suborbital	Aeronomy	29 September	Successful
29 September; 20:50	Apogee: 58 kilometres (36 mi)					

=== October ===
October launches
Date and time (UTC)	Rocket	Flight number	Launch site		LSP	
Date and time (UTC)	Payload	Operator	Orbit	Function	Decay (UTC)	Outcome
Date and time (UTC)	Remarks					
1 October	(Soviet Union) R-1		(Soviet Union) Kapustin Yar		(Soviet Union) OKB-1	
1 October		OKB-1	Suborbital	Missile test	1 October	Successful
1 October	(Soviet Union) R-1		(Soviet Union) Kapustin Yar		(Soviet Union) OKB-1	
1 October		OKB-1	Suborbital	Missile test	1 October	Successful
1 October	(Soviet Union) R-2		(Soviet Union) Kapustin Yar		(Soviet Union) OKB-1	
1 October		OKB-1	Suborbital	Missile test	1 October	Successful
1 October	(Soviet Union) R-2		(Soviet Union) Kapustin Yar		(Soviet Union) OKB-1	
1 October		OKB-1	Suborbital	Missile test	1 October	Successful
7 October; 17:00	(United States) Aerobee RTV-A-1a	USAF 43	(United States) Holloman LC-A		(United States) US Air Force	
7 October; 17:00		AFCRC / University of Colorado	Suborbital	Solar UV	7 October	Successful
7 October; 17:00	Apogee: 100 kilometres (62 mi)					
10 October	(Soviet Union) R-2		(Soviet Union) Kapustin Yar		(Soviet Union) OKB-1	
10 October		OKB-1	Suborbital	Missile test	10 October	Successful
16 October	(Soviet Union) R-1		(Soviet Union) Kapustin Yar		(Soviet Union) OKB-1	
16 October		OKB-1	Suborbital	Missile test	16 October	Successful
17 October	(Soviet Union) R-1		(Soviet Union) Kapustin Yar		(Soviet Union) OKB-1	
17 October		OKB-1	Suborbital	Missile test	17 October	Successful
19 October	(Soviet Union) R-1		(Soviet Union) Kapustin Yar		(Soviet Union) OKB-1	
19 October		OKB-1	Suborbital	Missile test	19 October	Successful
20 October	(Soviet Union) R-1		(Soviet Union) Kapustin Yar		(Soviet Union) OKB-1	
20 October		OKB-1	Suborbital	Missile test	20 October	Successful
24 October	(Soviet Union) R-2		(Soviet Union) Kapustin Yar		(Soviet Union) OKB-1	
24 October		OKB-1	Suborbital	Missile test	24 October	Successful
26 October	(Soviet Union) R-1		(Soviet Union) Kapustin Yar		(Soviet Union) OKB-1	
26 October		OKB-1	Suborbital	Missile test	26 October	Successful
27 October	(Soviet Union) R-1		(Soviet Union) Kapustin Yar		(Soviet Union) OKB-1	
27 October		OKB-1	Suborbital	Missile test	27 October	Successful
28 October	(Soviet Union) R-1		(Soviet Union) Kapustin Yar		(Soviet Union) OKB-1	
28 October		OKB-1	Suborbital	Missile test	28 October	Successful
28 October	(Soviet Union) R-1		(Soviet Union) Kapustin Yar		(Soviet Union) OKB-1	
28 October		OKB-1	Suborbital	Missile test	28 October	Successful
30 October	(Soviet Union) R-5		(Soviet Union) Kapustin Yar		(Soviet Union) OKB-1	
30 October		OKB-1	Suborbital	Missile test	30 October	Successful
30 October	Beginning of 2nd stage of experimental launches					

=== November ===
November launches
Date and time (UTC)	Rocket	Flight number	Launch site		LSP	
Date and time (UTC)	Payload	Operator	Orbit	Function	Decay (UTC)	Outcome
Date and time (UTC)	Remarks					
1 November	(Soviet Union) R-1		(Soviet Union) Kapustin Yar		(Soviet Union) OKB-1	
1 November		OKB-1	Suborbital	Missile test	1 November	Successful
1 November	(Soviet Union) R-1		(Soviet Union) Kapustin Yar		(Soviet Union) OKB-1	
1 November		OKB-1	Suborbital	Missile test	1 November	Successful
1 November	(Soviet Union) R-1		(Soviet Union) Kapustin Yar		(Soviet Union) OKB-1	
1 November		OKB-1	Suborbital	Missile test	1 November	Successful
1 November	(Soviet Union) R-1		(Soviet Union) Kapustin Yar		(Soviet Union) OKB-1	
1 November		OKB-1	Suborbital	Missile test	1 November	Successful
2 November; 18:32	(United States) Aerobee RTV-A-1a	USAF 44	(United States) Holloman LC-A		(United States) US Air Force	
2 November; 18:32	(United States) Ionosphere 5	AFCRC / University of Utah	Suborbital	Ionospheric	2 November	Successful
2 November; 18:32	Apogee: 121 kilometres (75 mi)					
3 November	(Soviet Union) R-5		(Soviet Union) Kapustin Yar		(Soviet Union) OKB-1	
3 November		OKB-1	Suborbital	Missile test	3 November	Successful
3 November; 18:15	(United States) Aerobee RTV-A-1a	USAF 45	(United States) Holloman LC-A		(United States) US Air Force	
3 November; 18:15	(United States) Ionosphere 6	AFCRC / University of Utah	Suborbital	Ionospheric	3 November	Successful
3 November; 18:15	Apogee: 121.5 kilometres (75.5 mi)					
12 November	(Soviet Union) R-1		(Soviet Union) Kapustin Yar		(Soviet Union) OKB-1	
12 November		OKB-1	Suborbital	Missile test	12 November	Successful
15 November	(Soviet Union) R-1		(Soviet Union) Kapustin Yar		(Soviet Union) OKB-1	
15 November		OKB-1	Suborbital	Missile test	15 November	Successful
15 November	(Soviet Union) R-1		(Soviet Union) Kapustin Yar		(Soviet Union) OKB-1	
15 November		OKB-1	Suborbital	Missile test	15 November	Successful
17 November	(Soviet Union) R-5		(Soviet Union) Kapustin Yar		(Soviet Union) OKB-1	
17 November		OKB-1	Suborbital	Missile test	17 November	Successful
19 November; 22:40	(United States) Aerobee RTV-N-10	NRL 14	(United States) White Sands LC-35		(United States) US Navy	
19 November; 22:40		NRL	Suborbital	Solar X-Ray / Solar UV / Aeronomy	19 November	Successful
19 November; 22:40	Apogee: 112 kilometres (70 mi)					
21 November	(Soviet Union) R-5		(Soviet Union) Kapustin Yar		(Soviet Union) OKB-1	
21 November		OKB-1	Suborbital	Missile test	21 November	Successful
24 November	(Soviet Union) R-1		(Soviet Union) Kapustin Yar		(Soviet Union) OKB-1	
24 November		OKB-1	Suborbital	Missile test	24 November	Successful
25 November; 15:46	(United States) Aerobee RTV-N-10	NRL 15	(United States) White Sands LC-35		(United States) US Navy	
25 November; 15:46		NRL	Suborbital	Solar X-Ray / Solar UV / Aeronomy	25 November	Successful
25 November; 15:46	Apogee: 95 kilometres (59 mi)					
26 November	(Soviet Union) R-5		(Soviet Union) Kapustin Yar		(Soviet Union) OKB-1	
26 November		OKB-1	Suborbital	Missile test	26 November	Partial failure

=== December ===
December launches
Date and time (UTC)	Rocket	Flight number	Launch site		LSP	
Date and time (UTC)	Payload	Operator	Orbit	Function	Decay (UTC)	Outcome
Date and time (UTC)	Remarks					
1 December; 15:30	(United States) Aerobee RTV-N-10	NRL 16	(United States) White Sands LC-35		(United States) US Navy	
1 December; 15:30		NRL	Suborbital	Solar X-Ray / Solar UV / Aeronomy	1 December	Successful
1 December; 15:30	Apogee: 129 kilometres (80 mi)					
5 December	(Soviet Union) R-5		(Soviet Union) Kapustin Yar		(Soviet Union) OKB-1	
5 December		OKB-1	Suborbital	Missile test	5 December	Successful
9 December	(Soviet Union) R-5		(Soviet Union) Kapustin Yar		(Soviet Union) OKB-1	
9 December		OKB-1	Suborbital	Missile test	9 December	Successful
9 December	End of second experimental flight series					

- ← Jan
- Feb
- Mar
- Apr
- May
- Jun
- Jul
- Aug
- Sep
- Oct
- Nov
- Dec →

== Suborbital launch statistics ==
=== By country ===
Launches by country
Country	Launches	Successes	Failures	Partial failures
Soviet Union	42	37	0	5
United States	46	34	12	0
World	88	71	12	5

=== By rocket ===
- Viking (second model)
- Aerobee RTV-N-10
- Aerobee XASR-SC-1
- Aerobee XASR-SC-2
- Aerobee RTV-A-1a
- Deacon rockoon (SUI)
- Deacon rockoon (NRL)
- R-1
- R-2
- R-5

Launches by rocket
Rocket	Country	Launches	Successes	Failures	Partial failures	Remarks
Viking (second model)	United States	1	0	1	0	
Aerobee RTV-N-10	United States	5	5	0	0	
Aerobee XASR-SC-1	United States	1	1	0	0	
Aerobee XASR-SC-2	United States	4	4	0	0	Retired
Aerobee RTV-A-1a	United States	13	12	1	0	
Deacon rockoon (SUI)	United States	16	9	7	0	
Deacon rockoon (NRL)	United States	6	3	3	0	
R-1	Soviet Union	23	23	0	0	
R-2	Soviet Union	4	4	0	0	
R-5	Soviet Union	15	10	0	5	Maiden flight

== See also ==
- Timeline of spaceflight
