= 1952 in spaceflight =

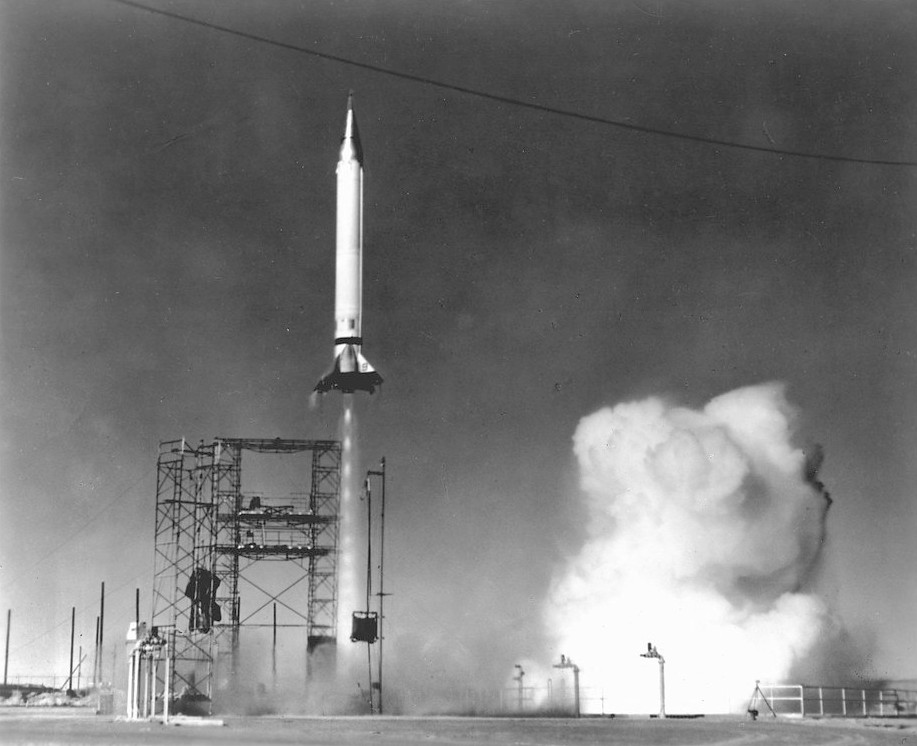
- Launch of Viking 9, 15 December 1952

Rockets
- Maiden flights: (United States) Aerobee RTV-A-1c (United States) Viking (second model) (United States) Deacon rockoon
- Retirements: (Nazi Germany) V-2 (United States) Aerobee RTV-A-1 (United States) Aerobee RTV-A-1c

1952 in spaceflight

In 1952, several branches of the United States' military, often in partnership with civilian organizations, continued their programs of sounding rocket research beyond the 100 kilometres (62 mi) boundary of space (as defined by the World Air Sports Federation) using the Aerobee rocket. The University of Iowa launched its first series of rockoon flights, demonstrating the validity of the balloon-launched rocket, a comparatively inexpensive way to explore the upper atmosphere. The launch of Viking 9 at the end of the year to an altitude of 135 mi (217 km), by the Naval Research Laboratory team under the management of Milton Rosen, represented the pinnacle of contemporary operational rocket design.

The same year, groundwork was laid for the launch of the first artificial satellite when, in October, the General Assembly of the International Council of Scientific Unions (ICSU) scheduled the International Geophysical Year for 1957–58. This scientific endeavor would involve 67 nations in a global investigation of physical phenomena, on the ground and in space.

No new models of ballistic missile were added to the arsenals of either the United States or the Soviet Union in 1952. However, work continued on large rocket development, particularly the US Army's Redstone and the Soviet R-5 missile. Both the R-1 and R-2 missiles had operational test runs during the year.

== Space exploration highlights ==
=== US Navy ===
In the late spring of 1952, the Naval Research Laboratory team, under the management of Milton Rosen, prepared to launch the first second-generation Viking rocket, Viking 8, from the White Sands Missile Range in New Mexico. The new Viking design was nearly one-and-a-half times as wide as its precursor, with the highest fuel-to-weight ratio of any rocket yet developed. The tail fins no longer supported the weight of the rocket, which had been the case with the first-generation design. Now, the Viking rocket rested on the base of its fuselage. This allowed the tail fins to be made much lighter, allowing the rocket to carry a heavier tank without weighing more than the first Viking design.

On 6 June 1952, Viking 8 broke loose of its moorings during a static firing test. After it was allowed to fly for 55 seconds in the hope that it would clear the immediate area and thus pose no danger to ground crew, Nat Wagner, head of the "Cutoff group", delivered a command to the rocket to cease its thrust. 65 seconds later, the rocket crashed 4 to 5 miles (6 to 8 km) downrange to the southeast.

With lessons learned from the Viking 8 failure, the successful 9 December static firing of Viking 9 was followed on 15 December by a successful launch from White Sands. The rocket reached an altitude of 135 miles (217 km), roughly the same as that of the first-generation Viking 7 in 1950. In addition to cameras that photographed the Earth during flight, Viking 9 carried a full suite of cosmic ray, ultraviolet, and X-ray detectors, including sixteen plates of emulsion gel for tracking the path of individual high energy particles. The experiment package was recovered intact after it had secured measurements high above the Earth's atmosphere.

=== US Army ===
The final flight of the V-2 rocket occurred on 19 September 1952 with an unsuccessful aeronomy mission conducted jointly by the Signal Corps Engineering Laboratories and University of Michigan from White Sands Launch Complex 33. The rocket reached an apogee of 7.1 kilometres (4.4 mi) before its tail exploded 27 seconds into the flight.

=== American civilian efforts ===
1952 saw the first rockoon flights. These balloon-mounted rockets were significantly cheaper than sounding rocket flights: $1800 per launch versus $25,000 for each Aerobee launch and $450,000 for each Viking launch. A series of seven ship-launched tests conducted by a University of Iowa team under James Van Allen achieved considerable success, with one flight grazing the edge of space with an apogee of 55 miles (89 km).

== Spacecraft development ==
=== US Air Force ===
Progress remained slow throughout 1952 on the Atlas, the nation's first intercontinental ballistic missile (ICBM), the contract for which had been awarded to Consolidated Vultee in January 1951 by the US Air Force's Air Research and Development Command. Conservative development policies and daunting technical problems were the official causes, but the Air Force's apparent lack of enthusiasm for the project, along with a limited budget and resources, were factors as well. It was not until the first successful H-bomb test at Elugelab in November 1952 that development of the Atlas, potentially capable of delivering such a weapon, garnered more support.

=== US Army ===
On 8 April 1952, Redstone Arsenal in Alabama officially gave the name of "Redstone" to the surface-to-surface missile, capable of delivering nuclear or conventional warheads to a range of 200 miles (320 km), which they had started developing on 10 July 1951. The office of the Chief of Ordnance of the Army (OCO) tasked Chrysler Corporation to proceed with active work as the prime contractor on the missile by a letter order contract in October 1952; this contract definitized on 19 June 1953.

=== Soviet military ===
In 1952, the Soviet Union focused its strategic rocket development on the R-5 missile, which superseded the overambitious 3,000 kilometres (1,900 mi) range R-3, previously canceled on 20 October 1951. OKB-1 under Sergei Korolev completed the conceptual design for the R-5, able to carry the same 1,000 kilograms (2,200 lb) payload as the R-1 and R-2 but over a distance of 1,200 kilometres (750 mi), by 30 October 1951.

This dramatic increase in performance of the R-5 over its predecessors was made possible through development of the RD-103 engine, an evolution of the RD-101 used in the R-2 missile, and by reducing the weight of the rocket through use of integrated tankage (while at the same time increasing propellant load by 60% over the R-2). The military had much more confidence in this incremental design than the radical leap forward that was the R-3, and work proceeded apace. Other innovations over the R-1 and R-2 included small aerodynamic rudders run by servomotors to replace the big fins of the R-1/R-2, and longitudinal acceleration integrators to improve the precision of engine cutoff and thus accuracy. Two of the first ten R-5s produced underwent stand tests through February 1952, and the sleek, cylindrical R-5, "the first Soviet strategic rocket", would be ready for its first launch March 1953.

Also in 1952, the design bureau OKB-486, under Valentin Glushko, began developing the RD-105 and RD-106 engines for an even more powerful rocket: the five engine R-6 ICBM. Using an integrated solder-welded configuration, developed by engineer Aleksei Isaev, these LOX/kerosene engines would be more powerful single chamber engines than those used in earlier rockets. Four 539.37 kN (121,260 lb_{f}) RD-105 would power the R-6's four strap-on engines while a 519.75 kN (116,840 lb_{f}) RD-106 would power the central booster.

That same year, there was also a series of fourteen test launches of the mass-produced version of R-2 missile, with a range of 600 kilometres (370 mi). Twelve of the missiles reached their targets. The R-1 also was test-launched seven times.

=== Civilian efforts ===
In October 1952, the General Assembly of the International Council of Scientific Unions (ICSU) adopted a proposal to undertake a third International Polar Year. This endeavor would involve both a wider scope, encompassing simultaneous observations of geophysical phenomena over the entire surface of the Earth including the Arctic and Antarctica, as well as a longer period, lasting 18 months. The International Geophysical Year (IGY), set for 1957–58, ultimately would involve the participation of 67 countries. To coordinate this massive effort, the ICSU formed the Comité Speciale de l'Année Géophysique Internationale (CSAGI), 'International Geophysical Year Special Committee', which would hold four major meetings with representation from all participating countries over the next four years.

In 1951, the University of Maryland's Fred Singer gave a series of lectures to the British Interplanetary Society in London espousing the use of small artificial satellites to conduct scientific observations. In 1952 Singer expanded his audience through publications and public presentations on his proposals for "MOUSE" (Minimum Orbiting Unmanned Satellite of the Earth). Though dismissed by many as too radical and/or in conflict with human exploration of space, the proposal catalyzed serious discussion of the use of satellites for scientific research.

== Launches ==
- ← Jan
- Feb
- Mar
- Apr
- May
- Jun
- Jul
- Aug
- Sep
- Oct
- Nov
- Dec →

=== January ===
January launches
Date and time (UTC)	Rocket	Flight number	Launch site		LSP	
Date and time (UTC)	Payload	Operator	Orbit	Function	Decay (UTC)	Outcome
Date and time (UTC)	Remarks					
30 January; 20:45	(United States) Aerobee RTV-A-1a	USAF 21	(United States) Holloman LC-A		(United States) US Air Force	
30 January; 20:45	Ionosphere 1	AFCRC / University of Utah	Suborbital	Ionospheric	30 January	Launch failure
30 January; 20:45	Apogee: 0 kilometres (0 mi), rocket exploded in tower					

=== February ===
February launches
Date and time (UTC)	Rocket	Flight number	Launch site		LSP	
Date and time (UTC)	Payload	Operator	Orbit	Function	Decay (UTC)	Outcome
Date and time (UTC)	Remarks					
19 February; 14:49	(United States) Aerobee RTV-A-1c	USAF 22	(United States) Holloman LC-A		(United States) US Air Force	
19 February; 14:49		AFCRC / University of Utah	Suborbital	Airglow	19 February	Launch failure
19 February; 14:49	Apogee: 0 kilometres (0 mi), maiden (and only) flight of the RTV-A-1c, which was an unboosted version of the RTV-A-1a. There was a thrust chamber explosion in the tower, but the instrumentation was recovered intact.					
19 February; 17:00	(United States) Aerobee RTV-N-10	NRL 7	(United States) White Sands LC-35		(United States) US Navy	
19 February; 17:00		NRL	Suborbital	Cosmic Radiation / Solar Radiation	19 February	Successful
19 February; 17:00	Apogee: 81.3 kilometres (50.5 mi)					
29 February; 14:40	(United States) Aerobee RTV-A-1	USAF 23	(United States) Holloman LC-A		(United States) US Air Force	
29 February; 14:40		AFCRC / University of Utah	Suborbital	Airglow	29 February	Successful
29 February; 14:40	Apogee: 89.3 kilometres (55.5 mi)					

=== April ===
April launches
Date and time (UTC)	Rocket	Flight number	Launch site		LSP	
Date and time (UTC)	Payload	Operator	Orbit	Function	Decay (UTC)	Outcome
Date and time (UTC)	Remarks					
22 April; 17:28	(United States) Aerobee RTV-A-1	USAF 24	(United States) Holloman LC-A		(United States) US Air Force	
22 April; 17:28		AFCRC / Boston University	Suborbital	Ionospheric	22 April	Successful
22 April; 17:28	Apogee: 113 kilometres (70 mi)					
30 April; 13:30	(United States) Aerobee RTV-N-10	NRL 8	(United States) White Sands LC-35		(United States) US Navy	
30 April; 13:30		NRL	Suborbital	Cosmic Radiation / Solar Radiation	30 April	Successful
30 April; 13:30	Apogee: 127.8 kilometres (79.4 mi)					

=== May ===
May launches
Date and time (UTC)	Rocket	Flight number	Launch site		LSP	
Date and time (UTC)	Payload	Operator	Orbit	Function	Decay (UTC)	Outcome
Date and time (UTC)	Remarks					
1 May; 14:59	(United States) Aerobee RTV-N-10	NRL 9	(United States) White Sands LC-35		(United States) US Navy	
1 May; 14:59		NRL	Suborbital	Cosmic Radiation / Solar Radiation	1 May	Successful
1 May; 14:59	Apogee: 126.0 kilometres (78.3 mi)					
1 May; 15:42	(United States) Aerobee RTV-A-1	USAF 25	(United States) Holloman LC-A		(United States) US Air Force	
1 May; 15:42		AFCRC / University of Rhode Island	Suborbital	Solar UV	1 May	Successful
1 May; 15:42	Apogee: 91 kilometres (57 mi)					
5 May; 13:44	(United States) Aerobee RTV-N-10	NRL 10	(United States) White Sands LC-35		(United States) US Navy	
5 May; 13:44		NRL	Suborbital	Cosmic Radiation / Solar Radiation	5 May	Successful
5 May; 13:44	Apogee: 127.0 kilometres (78.9 mi)					
15 May; 01:15	(United States) Aerobee XASR-SC-1	SC 23	(United States) White Sands LC-35		(United States) US Army	
15 May; 01:15	(United States) Sphere	SCEL / University of Michigan	Suborbital	Aeronomy	15 May	Successful
15 May; 01:15	Apogee: 76.1 kilometres (47.3 mi)					
20 May; 02:07	(United States) Aerobee XASR-SC-1	SC 24	(United States) White Sands LC-35		(United States) US Army	
20 May; 02:07	(United States) Grenades	USASC	Suborbital	Aeronomy	20 May	Successful
20 May; 02:07	Apogee: 89.5 kilometres (55.6 mi)					
20 May; 16:06	(Nazi Germany) V-2	V-2 No. 59 / TF-2	(United States) White Sands LC-33		(United States) US Army	
20 May; 16:06		SCEL / University of Michigan	Suborbital	Aeronomy / Photography	20 May	Successful
20 May; 16:06	Apogee: 103.5 kilometres (64.3 mi)					
21 May; 15:15	(United States) Aerobee RTV-A-1	USAF 26	(United States) Holloman LC-A		(United States) US Air Force	
21 May; 15:15	(United States) Aeromed 3	AFCRL / WADC Aero-Medical Laboratory	Suborbital	Biological	21 May	Successful
21 May; 15:15	Carried 2 Philippine monkeys, Pat and Mike, and 2 mice; all recovered. Apogee: 61 kilometres (38 mi) Flight tested requirement of restraints: one mouse was given a shelf to cling to; the other bounced from side to side of its smooth-sided plastic compartment. Acceleration was 15 gees for <1 second and 3-4 gees for 35 seconds. The two monkeys were strapped to their seats and anaesthetized. Mission demonstrated that pilot injury in rocket flight could be avoided with appropriate seats and straps.					

=== June ===
June launches
Date and time (UTC)	Rocket	Flight number	Launch site		LSP	
Date and time (UTC)	Payload	Operator	Orbit	Function	Decay (UTC)	Outcome
Date and time (UTC)	Remarks					
6 June; 17:30	(United States) Viking (second model)		(United States) White Sands LC-33		(United States) US Navy	
6 June; 17:30	(United States) Viking 8	NRL	Suborbital	Accidental launch	6 June	Launch failure
6 June; 17:30	Apogee: 6 kilometres (3.7 mi), accidentally launched during static fire ground test					
18 June; 17:50	(United States) Aerobee RTV-A-1	USAF 27	(United States) Holloman LC-A		(United States) US Air Force	
18 June; 17:50		AFCRC / University of Denver	Suborbital	Solar UV	18 June	Successful
18 June; 17:50	Apogee: 105 kilometres (65 mi)					
30 June; 14:32	(United States) Aerobee RTV-A-1	USAF 28	(United States) Holloman LC-A		(United States) US Air Force	
30 June; 14:32	(United States) Airglow 1	AFCRC	Suborbital	Sky Brightness	30 June	Successful
30 June; 14:32	Apogee: 101 kilometres (63 mi)					

=== August ===
August launches
Date and time (UTC)	Rocket	Flight number	Launch site		LSP	
Date and time (UTC)	Payload	Operator	Orbit	Function	Decay (UTC)	Outcome
Date and time (UTC)	Remarks					
8 August	(Soviet Union) R-2		(Soviet Union) Kapustin Yar		(Soviet Union) OKB-1	
8 August		OKB-1	Suborbital	Missile test	8 August	
8 August	First of fourteen test launches of mass-produced version; twelve reached their target					
August	(Soviet Union) R-2		(Soviet Union) Kapustin Yar		(Soviet Union) OKB-1	
August		OKB-1	Suborbital	Missile test	Same day	
August	Second of fourteen test launches of mass-produced version; twelve reached their target					
August	(Soviet Union) R-2		(Soviet Union) Kapustin Yar		(Soviet Union) OKB-1	
August		OKB-1	Suborbital	Missile test	Same day	
August	Third of fourteen test launches of mass-produced version; twelve reached their target					
August	(Soviet Union) R-2		(Soviet Union) Kapustin Yar		(Soviet Union) OKB-1	
August		OKB-1	Suborbital	Missile test	Same day	
August	Fourth of fourteen test launches of mass-produced version; twelve reached their target					
August	(Soviet Union) R-2		(Soviet Union) Kapustin Yar		(Soviet Union) OKB-1	
August		OKB-1	Suborbital	Missile test	Same day	
August	Fifth of fourteen test launches of mass-produced version; twelve reached their target					
August	(Soviet Union) R-2		(Soviet Union) Kapustin Yar		(Soviet Union) OKB-1	
August		OKB-1	Suborbital	Missile test	Same day	
August	Sixth of fourteen test launches of mass-produced version; twelve reached their target					
August	(Soviet Union) R-2		(Soviet Union) Kapustin Yar		(Soviet Union) OKB-1	
August		OKB-1	Suborbital	Missile test	Same day	
August	Seventh of fourteen test launches of mass-produced version; twelve reached their target					
August	(Soviet Union) R-2		(Soviet Union) Kapustin Yar		(Soviet Union) OKB-1	
August		OKB-1	Suborbital	Missile test	Same day	
August	Eighth of fourteen test launches of mass-produced version; twelve reached their target					
20 August	(Soviet Union) R-1		(Soviet Union) Kapustin Yar		(Soviet Union) OKB-1	
20 August		OKB-1	Suborbital	Missile test	20 August	Successful
21 August	(Soviet Union) R-1		(Soviet Union) Kapustin Yar		(Soviet Union) OKB-1	
21 August		OKB-1	Suborbital	Missile test	21 August	Successful
21 August; 06:25	(United States) Deacon rockoon	SUI 1	(United States) USCGC Eastwind, Kane Basin		(United States) US Coast Guard	
21 August; 06:25		University of Iowa	Suborbital	Cosmic Radiation	21 August	Partial failure
21 August; 06:25	Maiden flight of the Deacon Rockoon, (balloon) apogee: 21.4 kilometres (13.3 mi), rocket failed to fire					
22 August; 07:33	(Nazi Germany) V-2	TF-3	(United States) White Sands LC-33		(United States) US Army	
22 August; 07:33		NRL / AFCRC / National Institutes of Health	Suborbital	Aeronomy / Cosmic Radiation / Solar X-Ray / Magnetic Field / Sky Brightness	22 August	Successful
22 August; 07:33	Apogee: 78.1 kilometres (48.5 mi)					
24 August; 03:34	(United States) Deacon rockoon	SUI 2	(United States) USCGC Eastwind, northern Baffin Bay		(United States) US Coast Guard	
24 August; 03:34		University of Iowa	Suborbital	Cosmic Radiation	24 August	Partial failure
24 August; 03:34	(Balloon) Apogee: 21.4 kilometres (13.3 mi), rocket failed to fire, but instrument package worked					
25 August	(Soviet Union) R-1		(Soviet Union) Kapustin Yar		(Soviet Union) OKB-1	
25 August		OKB-1	Suborbital	Missile test	25 August	Successful
26 August; 18:53	(United States) Aerobee RTV-A-1a	USAF 29	(United States) Holloman LC-A		(United States) US Air Force	
26 August; 18:53	(United States) Ionosphere 2	AFCRC / University of Utah	Suborbital	Ionospheric	26 August	Launch failure
26 August; 18:53	Apogee: 32 kilometres (20 mi)					
29 August; 00:26	(United States) Deacon rockoon	SUI 3	(United States) USCGC Eastwind, northern Baffin Bay		(United States) US Coast Guard	
29 August; 00:26		University of Iowa	Suborbital	Cosmic Radiation	29 August	Spacecraft failure
29 August; 00:26	Apogee: 61.0 kilometres (37.9 mi), first successful firing of balloon-launched rocket, instruments failed to return data					
29 August; 07:36	(United States) Deacon rockoon	SUI 4	(United States) USCGC Eastwind, northern Baffin Bay		(United States) US Coast Guard	
29 August; 07:36		University of Iowa	Suborbital	Cosmic Radiation	29 August	Successful
29 August; 07:36	Apogee: 59.4 kilometres (36.9 mi)					
29 August; 18:15	(United States) Deacon rockoon	SUI 5	(United States) USCGC Eastwind, northern Baffin Bay		(United States) US Coast Guard	
29 August; 18:15		University of Iowa	Suborbital	Cosmic Radiation	29 August	Successful
29 August; 18:15	Apogee: 76.1 kilometres (47.3 mi)					
31 August; 21:10	(United States) Deacon rockoon	SUI 6	(United States) USCGC Eastwind, northern Baffin Bay		(United States) US Coast Guard	
31 August; 21:10		University of Iowa	Suborbital	Cosmic Radiation	31 August	Successful
31 August; 21:10	Apogee: 64.1 kilometres (39.8 mi)					

=== September ===
September launches
Date and time (UTC)	Rocket	Flight number	Launch site		LSP	
Date and time (UTC)	Payload	Operator	Orbit	Function	Decay (UTC)	Outcome
Date and time (UTC)	Remarks					
September	(Soviet Union) R-2		(Soviet Union) Kapustin Yar		(Soviet Union) OKB-1	
September		OKB-1	Suborbital	Missile test	Same day	
September	Ninth of fourteen test launches of mass-produced version; twelve reached their target					
September	(Soviet Union) R-2		(Soviet Union) Kapustin Yar		(Soviet Union) OKB-1	
September		OKB-1	Suborbital	Missile test	Same day	
September	Tenth of fourteen test launches of mass-produced version; twelve reached their target					
September	(Soviet Union) R-2		(Soviet Union) Kapustin Yar		(Soviet Union) OKB-1	
September		OKB-1	Suborbital	Missile test	Same day	
September	Eleventh of fourteen test launches of mass-produced version; twelve reached their target					
September	(Soviet Union) R-2		(Soviet Union) Kapustin Yar		(Soviet Union) OKB-1	
September		OKB-1	Suborbital	Missile test	Same day	
September	Twelfth of fourteen test launches of mass-produced version; twelve reached their target					
September	(Soviet Union) R-2		(Soviet Union) Kapustin Yar		(Soviet Union) OKB-1	
September		OKB-1	Suborbital	Missile test	Same day	
September	Thirteenth of fourteen test launches of mass-produced version; twelve reached their target					
3 September; 14:49	(United States) Aerobee RTV-N-10	NRL 11	(United States) White Sands LC-35		(United States) US Navy	
3 September; 14:49		NRL	Suborbital	Solar Radiation	3 September	Successful
3 September; 14:49	Apogee: 99.0 kilometres (61.5 mi)					
4 September; 09:17	(United States) Deacon rockoon	SUI 7	(United States) USCGC Eastwind, northern Baffin Bay		(United States) US Coast Guard	
4 September; 09:17		University of Iowa	Suborbital	Cosmic Radiation	4 September	Successful
4 September; 09:17	Apogee: 64.1 kilometres (39.8 mi)					
18 September	(Soviet Union) R-2		(Soviet Union) Kapustin Yar		(Soviet Union) OKB-1	
18 September		OKB-1	Suborbital	Missile test	18 September	
18 September	Last of fourteen test launches of mass-produced version; twelve reached their target					
19 September; 15:49	(Nazi Germany) V-2	TF-5	(United States) White Sands LC-33		(United States) US Army	
19 September; 15:49		SCEL / University of Michigan	Suborbital	Aeronomy	19 September	Launch failure
19 September; 15:49	Final flight of the V-2, apogee: 7.1 kilometres (4.4 mi), tail exploded at 27 seconds					
25 September; 03:50	(United States) Aerobee XASR-SC-1	SC 25	(United States) White Sands LC-35		(United States) US Army	
25 September; 03:50	(United States) Grenades	SCEL	Suborbital	Aeronomy	25 September	Successful
25 September; 03:50	Apogee: 117 kilometres (73 mi)					

=== October ===
October launches
Date and time (UTC)	Rocket	Flight number	Launch site		LSP	
Date and time (UTC)	Payload	Operator	Orbit	Function	Decay (UTC)	Outcome
Date and time (UTC)	Remarks					
10 October; 14:24	(United States) Aerobee RTV-A-1	USAF 30	(United States) Holloman LC-A		(United States) US Air Force	
10 October; 14:24		AFCRC / University of Denver	Suborbital	Solar UV	10 October	Successful
10 October; 14:24	Apogee: 110 kilometres (68 mi)					
22 October; 14:35	(United States) Aerobee RTV-A-1	USAF 31	(United States) Holloman LC-A		(United States) US Air Force	
22 October; 14:35		AFCRC / University of Michigan	Suborbital	Aeronomy	22 October	Successful
22 October; 14:35	Apogee: 100 kilometres (62 mi)					
23 October; 03:45	(United States) Aerobee XASR-SC-2	SC 26	(United States) White Sands LC-35		(United States) US Army	
23 October; 03:45	(United States) Grenades	SCEL	Suborbital	Aeronomy	23 October	Successful
23 October; 03:45	Apogee: 112.0 kilometres (69.6 mi)					
29 October	(Soviet Union) R-1		(Soviet Union) Kapustin Yar		(Soviet Union) OKB-1	
29 October		OKB-1	Suborbital	Missile test	29 October	Successful
30 October	(Soviet Union) R-1		(Soviet Union) Kapustin Yar		(Soviet Union) OKB-1	
30 October		OKB-1	Suborbital	Missile test	30 October	Successful
30 October	(Soviet Union) R-1		(Soviet Union) Kapustin Yar		(Soviet Union) OKB-1	
30 October		OKB-1	Suborbital	Missile test	30 October	Successful

=== November ===
November launches
Date and time (UTC)	Rocket	Flight number	Launch site		LSP	
Date and time (UTC)	Payload	Operator	Orbit	Function	Decay (UTC)	Outcome
Date and time (UTC)	Remarks					
6 November; 15:56	(United States) Aerobee RTV-A-1	USAF 32	(United States) Holloman LC-A		(United States) US Air Force	
6 November; 15:56	Airglow 2	AFCRC	Suborbital	Sky Brightness	6 November	Successful
6 November; 15:56	Apogee: 76 kilometres (47 mi)					
21 November	(Soviet Union) R-1		(Soviet Union) Kapustin Yar		(Soviet Union) OKB-1	
21 November		OKB-1	Suborbital	Missile test	21 November	Successful

=== December ===
December launches
Date and time (UTC)	Rocket	Flight number	Launch site		LSP	
Date and time (UTC)	Payload	Operator	Orbit	Function	Decay (UTC)	Outcome
Date and time (UTC)	Remarks					
11 December; 23:47	(United States) Aerobee XASR-SC-1	SC 29	(United States) White Sands LC-35		(United States) US Army	
11 December; 23:47	(United States) Sphere	SCEL / University of Michigan	Suborbital	Aeronomy / Cosmic Radiation	11 December	Successful
11 December; 23:47	Apogee: 105.1 kilometres (65.3 mi)					
12 December; 19:38	(United States) Aerobee RTV-A-1	USAF 33	(United States) Holloman LC-A		(United States) US Air Force	
12 December; 19:38		AFCRC / University of Colorado	Suborbital	Solar UV	12 December	Successful
12 December; 19:38	Final flight of the RTV-A-1, apogee: 89 kilometres (55 mi)					
15 December; 21:38	(United States) Viking (second model)		(United States) White Sands LC-33		(United States) US Navy	
15 December; 21:38	(United States) Viking 9	NRL	Suborbital	Solar Radiation / Cosmic Radiation / Photography	15 December	Successful
15 December; 21:38	Apogee: 219 kilometres (136 mi)					

- ← Jan
- Feb
- Mar
- Apr
- May
- Jun
- Jul
- Aug
- Sep
- Oct
- Nov
- Dec →

== Suborbital launch statistics ==
=== By country ===
Launches by country
Country	Launches	Successes	Failures	Partial failures
Soviet Union	21	19	0	2
United States	35	27	5	3
World	56	46	5	5

=== By rocket ===
- V-2 (American)
- Viking (second model)
- Aerobee RTV-N-10
- Aerobee XASR-SC-1
- Aerobee XASR-SC-2
- Aerobee RTV-A-1
- Aerobee RTV-A-1a
- Aerobee RTV-A-1c
- Deacon rockoon
- R-1
- R-2

Launches by rocket
Rocket	Country	Launches	Successes	Failures	Partial failures	Remarks
V-2	United States	3	2	1	0	Retired
Viking (second model)	United States	2	1	1	0	Maiden flight
Aerobee RTV-N-10	United States	5	5	0	0	
Aerobee XASR-SC-1	United States	4	4	0	0	
Aerobee XASR-SC-2	United States	1	1	0	0	
Aerobee RTV-A-1	United States	10	10	0	0	Retired
Aerobee RTV-A-1a	United States	2	0	2	0	
Aerobee RTV-A-1c	United States	1	0	1	0	Maiden flight, retired
Deacon rockoon	United States	7	4	0	3	Maiden flight
R-1	Soviet Union	7	7	0	0	
R-2	Soviet Union	14	12	0	2	

== See also ==
- Timeline of spaceflight
