= R-5 Pobeda =

R-5
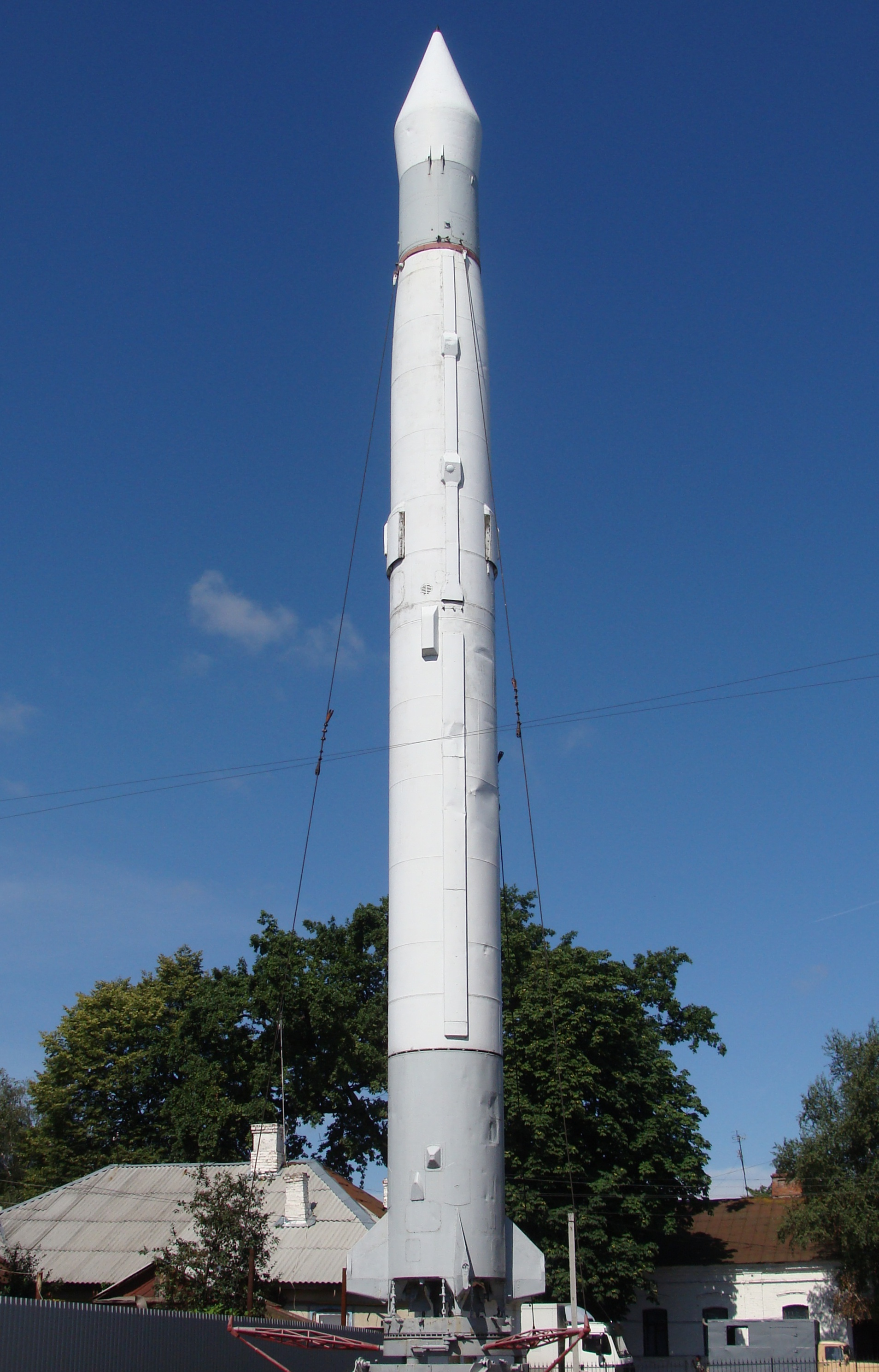
- R-5 on display at the Zhytomyr Korolyov Museum
- Type: Theatre ballistic missile Medium-range ballistic missile
- Place of origin: Soviet Union

Service history
- In service: 1956–1967

Production history
- Manufacturer: Yuzhmash

Specifications
- Mass: 29,100 kg
- Length: 20.75 m
- Diameter: 1.65 m
- Warhead: 80 kt, 1 Mt thermonuclear warhead
- Engine: RD-103M, 8D52
- Propellant: Liquid (92% Ethanol/water solution & LOX)
- Operational range: 1,200 km (750 mi)
- Guidance system: inertial guidance plus radio command guidance
- Accuracy: 1.5 km

The R-5 Pobeda (Побе́да, "Victory") was a medium range ballistic missile developed by the Soviet Union during the Cold War. The upgraded R-5M version, the first Soviet missile capable of carrying a nuclear weapon, was assigned the NATO reporting name SS-3 Shyster and carried the GRAU index 8K51.

The R-5 was developed by OKB-1 as a single-stage missile with a detachable warhead reentry vehicle. The R-5M was a nuclear armed missile with greater payload and weight entered service in March 1956, was deployed along the western and eastern Russian borders, and in 1959 was installed in East Germany, the first Soviet nuclear missile bases outside the USSR. The missile was retired in 1967, superseded by the R-12.

In 1958, R-5A rockets were used to launch pairs of dogs to altitudes above 450 km (280 mi).

== Description ==
The R-5 was a single-stage Medium Range Ballistic Missile (MRBM) with a range of 1,200 km (750 mi). Using 92% ethanol for fuel and liquid oxygen as an oxidizer, the rocket had a dry weight of 4,030 kg (8,880 lb) (fueled, 28,900 kg (63,700 lb)) and carried a detachable reentry vehicle with a payload capacity of 1,000 kg (2,200 lb). Quickly upgraded to the nuclear-capable R-5M, this missile was just under 21 m (69 ft) long and 1.652 m (5 ft 5.0 in) in diameter, had a dry weight of 4,390 kg (9,680 lb) (fueled, 29,100 kg (64,200 lb)), and carried a 1,350 kg (2,980 lb) payload. The R-5 had an accuracy of 1.5 km (0.93 mi) downrange and 1.25 km (0.78 mi) cross-range from the aim point, substantially greater than that of the R-1 and R-2 missiles. With its range (five times that of the R-1; more than twice that of the R-2), accuracy, and atomic armament, the R-5M was the Soviet Union's first real strategic missile, carrying a nuclear warhead yielding at least 80 kilotons (kt). Later, the R-5M received a 1 megaton (mt) thermonuclear warhead.

== Development ==
The R-1 and R-2, developed by NII-88 under the supervision of Chief Designer Sergei Korolev were essentially direct descendants of the German V-2 rocket developed during World War Two. Korolev's next design, the 27 m (89 ft)-long, 3,000 km (1,900 mi) range R-3, was a bold step forward in the fulfillment of Josef Stalin's 1947 request for a "transatlantic" Intercontinental Ballistic Missile (ICBM). By far the largest and costliest ballistic missile program in the USSR to date, its innovations were to include fuel and oxidizer tanks that were integral to (not separate from) the frame of the rocket. In addition, the large, heavy graphite stabilizing fins of its predecessors were to be omitted. Rather than use ethanol as fuel, the R-3 would use the more-efficient kerosene.

Neither Valentin Glushko of OKB-486 nor NII-1's Aleksandr Polyarniy were able to produce the advanced engines required for the design. As a result, in the spring of 1951, Korolev revised his plans to instead concentrate on an easier stepping stone toward an ICBM. His team had already managed to create the R-3A, an experiment rocket with a range of 900 km (560 mi). Using the RD-103 engine, a evolution of the RD-101 used in the R-2 missile, and by reducing the weight of the rocket through use of integrated tankage (while at the same time increasing propellant load by 60% over the R-2), the R-5 would have a range of 1,200 km (750 mi). The military had much more confidence in this incremental design than the radical leap forward that was the R-3, and work proceeded apace. Other innovations over the R-1/R-2 included small aerodynamic rudders run by servomotors to replace the big fins of the R-1/R-2, and longitudinal acceleration integrators to improve the precision of engine cutoff and thus accuracy. The R-5 missile used combined autonomous inertial control with lateral radio-correction for guidance and control.

== Testing ==
The R-5 underwent its first series of eight test launches from 15 March to 23 May 1953. After two failures, the third rocket, launched 2 April, marked the beginning of streak of success. Seven more missiles were launched between 30 October and December, all of which reached their targets. A final series of launches, designed to test modifications made in response to issues with the first series, was scheduled for mid-1954. These began 12 August 1954, continuing through 7 February 1955. These tests confirmed the soundness of the design and cleared the way for nuclear and sounding rocket variants. One issue that surfaced in this final round of testing was an increasing vibration of the control fins during flight, caused by flexing of the long rocket as it traveled. This problem had been unknown on the shorter R-1 and R-2 rockets, and it posed a potential hazard to the structural integrity of the missile. The vibrations of the frame and fuel also interfered with the guidance system. The experience gained from solving these problems was applied not just to the R-5 but all subsequent missiles, including the R-7 Semyorka.

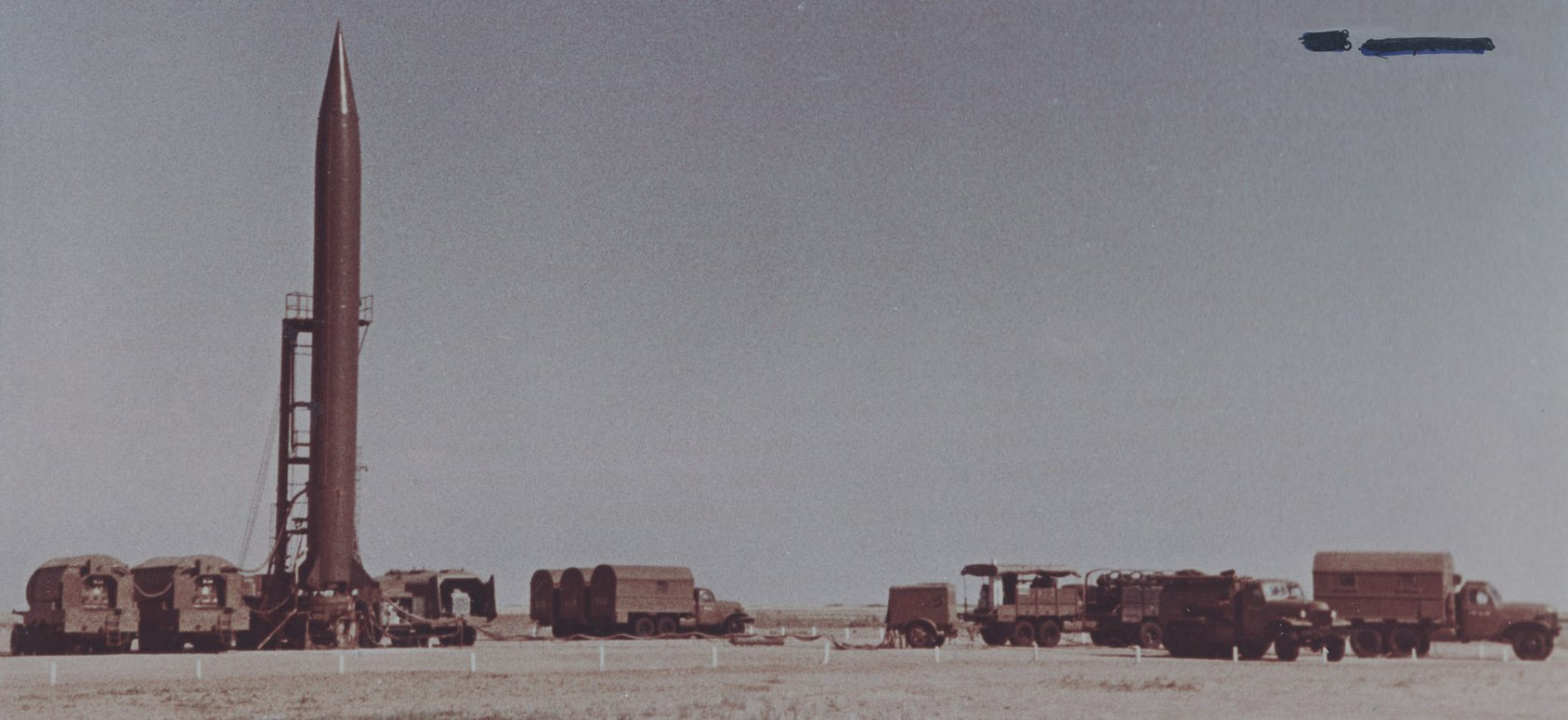
Nuclear-tipped R-5M in ready-to-launch condition

Upon the completion of the R-5 design, work began on the nuclear-capable R-5M with similar launch mass and range, but designed to carry a nuclear warhead. This rocket, which would be the world's first nuclear missile, was a stopgap weapon pending the development of an ICBM, the development of both of which had been decreed by the USSR Council of Ministers in late 1953. Test flights of this new rocket flew from January 1955 through February 1956. The test on 2 February 1956 involved a live nuclear payload, with a yield of less than 3 kilotons. This flight earned Korolev and his deputy, Vasily Mishin, the title Hero of Socialist Labor. 20 engineers at NII-88 received the Order of Lenin.

== Military service ==
The R-5 entered military service in 1955. The R-5M entered service in March 1956 with the designation "8K51". On 2 June 1956, the R-5M was introduced into the Strategic Rocket Forces. 48 missiles were deployed, primarily at sites close to the USSR's western borders, over the course of the next two years. They were put on alert for the first time in 1959. The road-transportable missiles could be set up vertically for launch at any soil-stabilized or concrete-covered site. It took about five hours to ready the missile for firing, where it could remain at the ready (with a reaction time of about 15 minutes) as much as one hour.

Initially deployed with nuclear warheads of 80 kt yields or more, one megaton thermonuclear warheads were later installed on missiles on duty in the Baltic states, Crimea, and the Russian Far East. In 1959, the R-5M was installed at Vogelsang, Zehdenick and Fürstenberg/Havel in East Germany, the first Soviet nuclear missile bases outside the USSR. Known by the American Department of Defense as the SS-3 and by NATO as the "Shyster", the R-5M left service in 1967, superseded by the more effective R-12.

== Variants ==
A scientific version of the R-5, the R-5A, was finished in 1958. Its first flight was 21 February 1958, and in its subsequent three flights, the rocket carried pairs of space dogs to altitudes of more than 400 km (250 mi), offering nine minutes of zero gravity. Other variants of the R-5, including the R-5B, R-5V, and Vertikal, were used until well into the 1970's for test of equipment and for scientific research.

== Operators ==
Soviet Union

- Soviet Army

== See also ==
- List of missiles
- Soviet rocketry
