= R-2 (missile) =

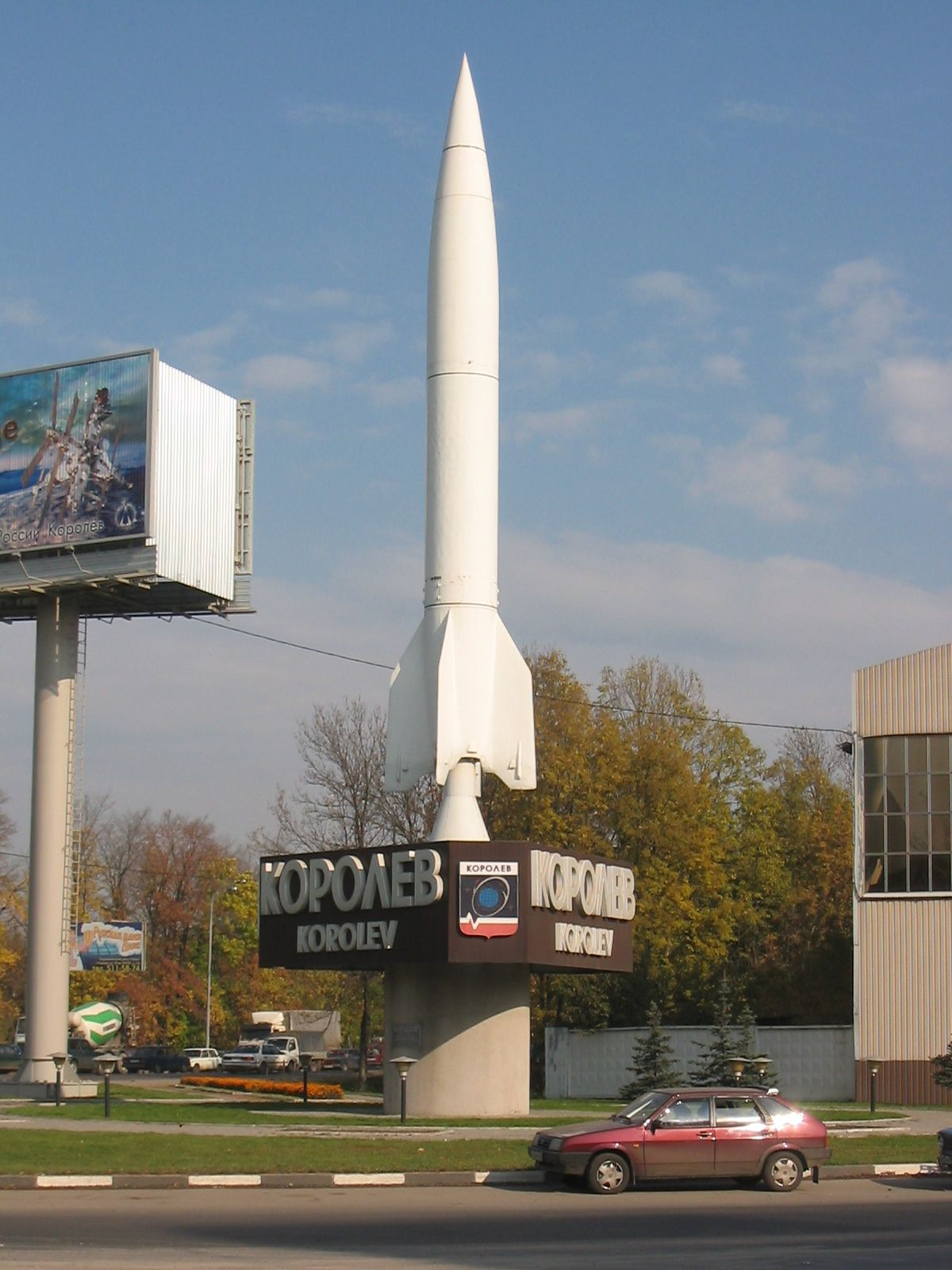
- R-2 missile at Korolev City of Moscow region
- Type: Theatre ballistic missile Short-range ballistic missile
- Place of origin: Soviet Union

Service history
- In service: 27 November 1951–1962
- Used by: Soviet Union

Production history
- Manufacturer: Yuzhmash and OKB-1

Specifications
- Mass: 19,632 kg
- Length: 17.65 m
- Diameter: 1.65 m
- Wingspan: 3.60 m
- Engine: RD-101
- Propellant: LOX / Alcohol
- Operational range: 576 km (358 mi)
- Maximum speed: 2175 m/s
- Accuracy: 8 km

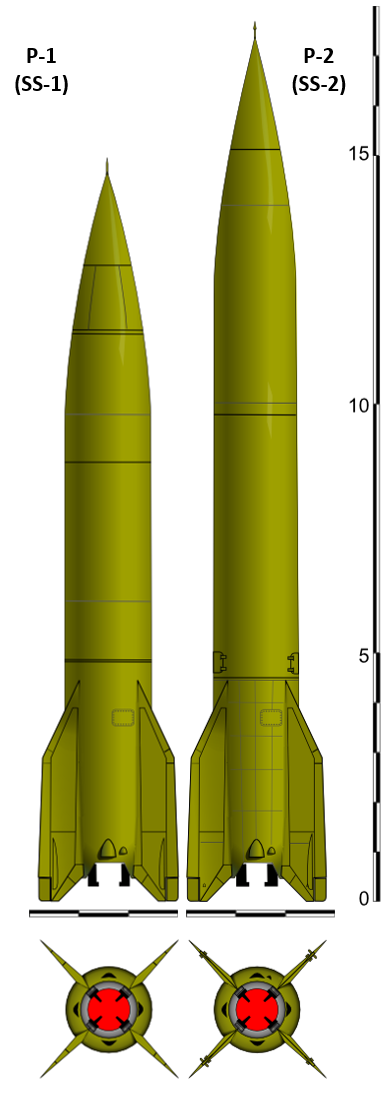
R-1 and R-2 rockets

The R-2 (NATO reporting name SS-2 Sibling) was a Soviet short-range ballistic missile developed from and having twice the range as the R-1 missile (itself a copy of the German V-2). Developed from 1946-1951, the R-2 entered service in numbers in 1953 and was deployed in mobile units throughout the Soviet Union until 1962. A sounding rocket derivative, the R-2A, tested a prototype of the dog-carrying capsule flown on Sputnik 2 in 1957. The same year, the R-2 was licensed for production in the People's Republic of China, where it entered service as the Dongfeng 1.

== History ==
In 1945 the Soviets captured several key A-4 (V-2) rocket production facilities, and also gained the services of some German scientists and engineers related to the project. Under the supervision of the Special technical Commission (OTK) established by the Soviet Union to oversee rocketry operations in Germany, A-4s were assembled and studied. This prompted the 13 May 1946 decree of the Soviet Council of Ministers for, in part, the development of a Soviet copy of the A-4, which would be the first domestically produced ballistic missile. A further decree on 16 May converted the M.I. Kalinin Plant No. 88, which had produced artillery and tanks during World War II into NII-88, tasked with managing the Soviet Union's long-range rocketry programs. In April 1947 Josef Stalin authorized the production of the R-1 missile, the designation for the Soviet copy of V-2. NII-88 chief designer Sergei Korolev oversaw the R-1's development. Testing of the R-1 proceeded from 1948 to 1950, and the R-1 missile system entered into service in the Soviet Army on 28 November 1950.

By the latter half of 1946, Korolev and rocket engineer Valentin Glushko had, with extensive input from German engineers, outlined a successor to the R-1 with an extended frame and a new engine designed by Glushko. The R-2 would have a range of 600 kilometres (370 mi), twice that of the R-1, while maintaining a similar payload of around 1,000 kilograms (2,200 lb).

Korolev proposed commencement of the R-2 project in January 1947, but it was declined by the Soviet government, which favored development of the more technologically conservative R-1. Moreover, development of the R-2 was in direct competition with the G-1 missile being concurrently developed by Helmut Gröttrup, head of a German team of engineers. Though the G-1 was a compelling design, able to lift a payload three times heavier than that of the A-4, and with higher precision and a shorter launch preparation time, it was politically infeasible to leave the Soviet missile program in the hands of Germans. Thus, on April 14, 1948, the same decree that authorized the operational production of the R-1 also sanctioned development of the R-2. The G-1 was ultimately never completed.

== Description ==
Like its predecessor, the R-1, the R-2 was a single-stage missile using ethanol as a fuel and liquid oxygen as an oxidizer. At a length of 17.65 m (57.9 ft) and a mass of 19,632 kg (43,281 lb), the R-2 was 2.5 m (8 ft 2 in) longer and the dry weight of 4,528 kg (9,983 lb) was about 500 kg (1,100 lb) heavier than the R-1. Maximum body diameter remained 1.65 m (5 ft 5 in), the same as the R-1, and in the interests of conservatism, the R-2 retained the R-1's graphite stabilizing fins, though they reduced lifting capacity and caused heating and stress issues.

The R-2 design included four major improvements over the R-1:

- The warhead separated from the rocket prior to atmospheric reentry, enhancing hull strength (one of the V-2/R-1's biggest weaknesses) and increasing range.
- The propellant tank became the main load-bearing structure for the rocket, in contrast to the R-1's load-bearing hull. This reduced the overall weight of the spaceframe.
- The R-2 had much improved command guidance, and access to the unit was made easier to reduce prelaunch preparation time.
- The RD-101 engine was 50% more powerful than the RD-100 used by the R-1. This increased performance was made possible by raising combustion pressure and increasing the concentration of ethanol fuel.

== Development ==
Test launches of an experimental version of the R-2, designated R-2E, began on 25 September 1949. Five of these slightly shorter (17 m (56 ft)) rockets were fired from Kapustin Yar, three of them successfully. The R-1A, a variant of the R-1 developed largely to test the separable warhead concept to be used in the R-2, was also test-flown in 1949. Launches of the full-scale R-2 began on 21 October 1950, the last being fired on 20 December. None of the 12 flights in this series fulfilled their primary objectives due to engine failures, warhead trajectory errors, and malfunctions with the guidance systems.

A second series of tests was carried out between 2-27 July, 1951. The R-2 had been made more reliable by then, and twelve of the thirteen flights successfully reached their targets. A subsequent series of 18 launches in 1951 had 14 successes. Per an order dated 27 November, 1951, the R-2 was formally adopted as operational armament for the Soviet Union, and production was authorized at factory 586 in Dnepropetrovsk three days later. Mass production began at this factory in June 1953. As with the R-1, reliability remained suboptimal. In a series of 14 operational R-2s test-launched in 1952, only 12 reached their target.

== Military service ==
The R-2 was deployed in Supreme Command Reserve (RVGK) engineer brigades consisting of three divisions each equipped with two rockets and mobile launch equipment. A crew of 11 was required for the launch of each missile, preparations for which took six hours, including 15 minutes for guidance system programming. After preparation, a rocket could stand ready to fire for 24 hours before it required defueling and renewed preparations. The R-2 was launched operationally in temperatures ranging from −40 °C (−40 °F) to 50 °C (122 °F), withstanding wind speeds of up to 15 m/s (34 mph).

The first two R-2 military units, the 54th and 56th brigades, were formed for the 1952 test launches. Starting in 1953, divisions were deployed to Zhytomyr; Kolomyia; Medved, Novgorod Oblast; Kamyshin, Volgograd Oblast; Šiauliai, Lithuanian SSR; Dzhambul, Kazakh SSR; and Ordzhonikidze, and in the Far East. The R-2 was retired from active service in 1962.

Like the R-1, the R-2's utility was limited by the smallness of its warhead. The Geran (Eng: Geranium) radiological warhead, which would disperse radioactive liquid as toxic rain around the impact point, was proposed for use with the R-2. However, this warhead was ultimately never developed.

The West obtained its first photographs of the R-2 (which they designated SS-2 "Sibling") in December 1959 when aerial surveillance returned images from rockets deployed at Kapustin Yar. These confirmed the dimensions of the rocket and revealed much information about the organization of the RVGK brigades.

== R-2A sounding rocket ==
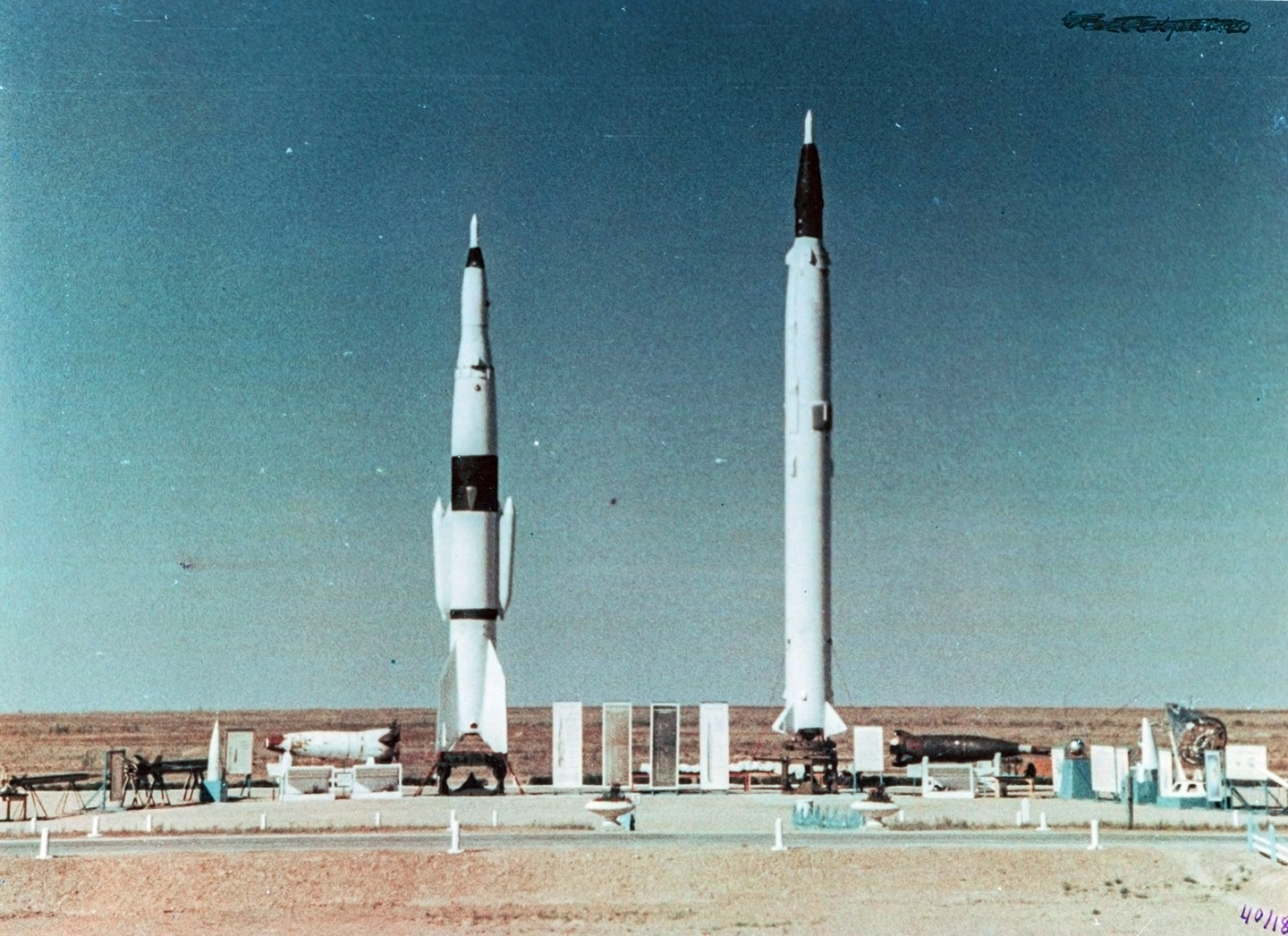
R-2A with dog capsule and scientific pods (next to R-5 (missile))

The R-2 had a maximum altitude of 200 km (120 mi), a two-fold improvement over that of the R-1. This made it a much more desirable vehicle for probing outer space. OKB-1 developed a draft plan for the R-2A sounding rocket in 1956. This new vehicle would loft a 1,340 kg (2,950 lb) capsule housing two dogs and also two 430 kg (950 lb) strap-on pods for scientific experiments.

A first series of five launches, each carrying a pair of dogs, was carried out from 16 May 1957 through 9 September. During these flights, the animals experienced several minutes of weightlessness. Just two months later, Sputnik 2 was launched into orbit containing a canine passenger inside a capsule derived from the one used on the R-2A. Sounding rocket flights continued through 1960 with biological and ionospheric packages.

Originally, OKB-1 planned to use the R2A for suborbital human test flights. This was on the assumption that a human orbital flight would not be feasible until the mid '60s. With the completion of the R-7 Semyorka ICBM, however, it became clear that a crewed mission into orbit would happen much sooner, and the plan was abandoned.

== Chinese version (Dongfeng 1) ==
On 6 December 1957 an agreement was signed to license production of the R-2 to China, which was produced as the Dongfeng 1. In August 1958, a group of OKB-1 senior engineers and several R-2 missiles were sent to China in aid of that country's fledgling ballistic missile program. This team was sent home 2 August 1960 amidst increased tension between the Soviet Union and China.

== Operators ==
Soviet Union

- Soviet Army

== See also ==
- German influence on the Soviet space program
- R-1 (missile)
- Soviet rocketry
- Strategic Rocket Forces
