= White Sands V-2 Launching Site =

- White Sands V-2 Launching Site (Launch Complex 33)
- U.S. National Register of Historic Places
- U.S. National Historic Landmark
- NM State Register of Cultural Properties
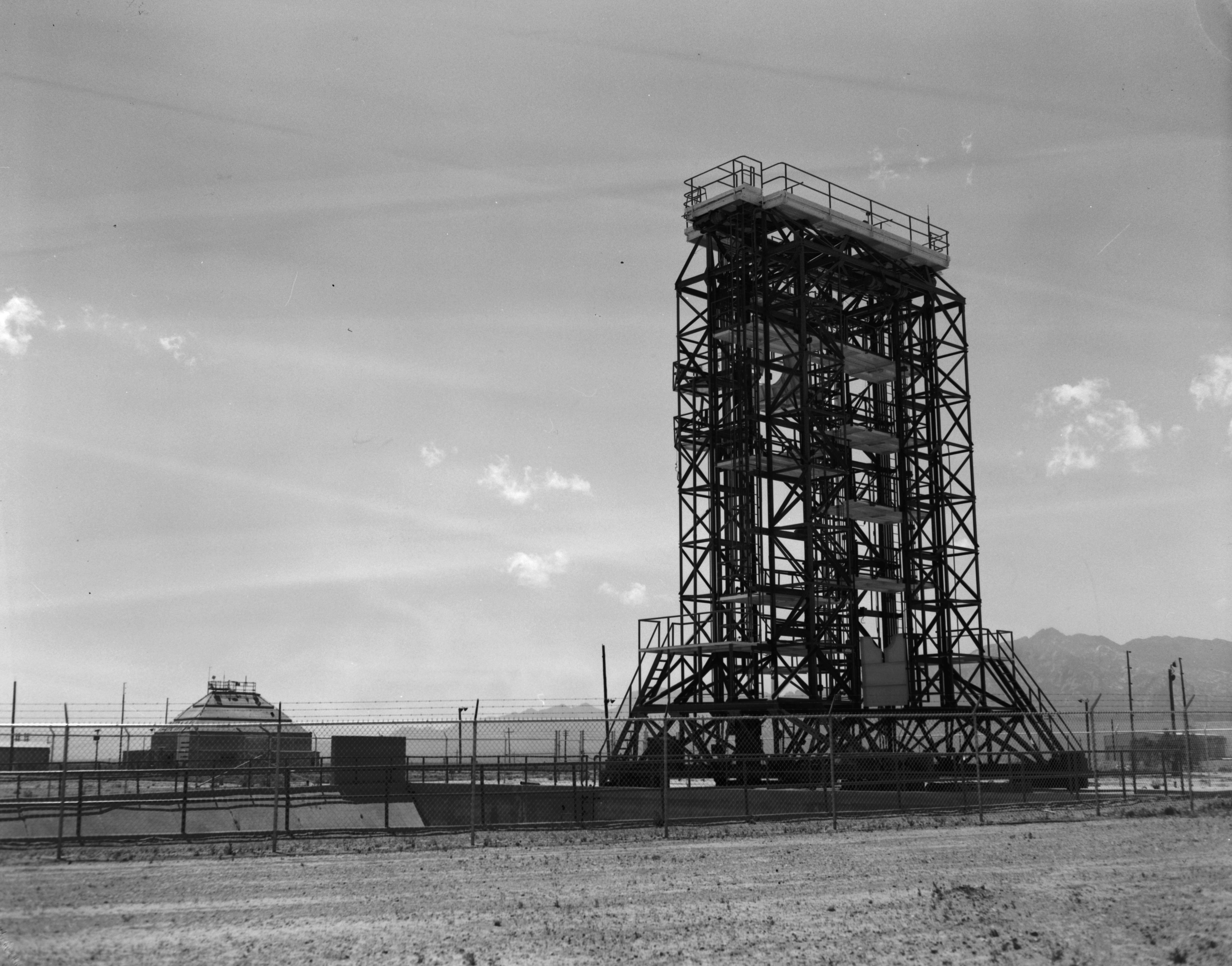
- V-2 rocket facilities

- Location within New Mexico Location within the United States
- Location: White Sands Missile Range, New Mexico
- Coordinates: 32°24′4″N 106°22′40″W
- Area: 10 acres (4.0 ha)
- Built: 1945
- Built by: U.S. Army
- NRHP reference No.: 85003541
- NMSRCP No.: 580

Significant dates
- Added to NRHP: October 3, 1985
- Designated NHL: October 3, 1985
- Designated NMSRCP: January 20, 1978

The White Sands V-2 Launching Site, also known as Launch Complex 33 and originally as Army Launch Area Number 1, is an historic rocket launch complex at White Sands Missile Range in southern New Mexico. It was here that the United States first performed test launches of German V-2 rockets captured toward the end of World War II. These tests were the first step in both military advances in rocketry, and in the development of the United States space exploration programs. The site was designated a National Historic Landmark in 1985.

== History ==
The Nazi German V-2 rocket was one of the most advanced weapons produced in World War II, and hundreds of them were launched at Allied targets in the last two years of the war. In the aftermath of the war, the United States launched Operation Paperclip, a secret program that successfully recruited German scientists and engineers (most prominently Wernher von Braun) to work for the American military, and transported 100 captured V-2 rockets to the recently established White Sands Missile Range. Between 1946 and 1951, the Army fired 67 V-2 sounding rockets from this site. These launches, and the training of a class of scientists and engineers, led directly to the further development of new rocket launch programs, including ultimately the launch of humans into space.

== Site description ==
Launch Complex 33 is located near the far southern end of the White Sands Missile Range, east of Las Cruces, New Mexico. On the range grounds, it is located on 10 acres (4.0 ha) east of the White Sands Range Museum. There are two principal surviving elements of the launch complex. One is the steel gantry, a steel structure 75 feet (23 m) in height and 25 feet (7.6 m) wide, from which the V-2s and later classes of rockets were launched. It has four platforms at different heights, which can be swung into position to accommodate rockets of different sizes, and a network of block-and-tackle systems to assist in rocket placement. The other structure is a concrete observation tower with walls 10 feet (3.0 m) thick, and a pyramidal roof cap that consists of 27 feet (8.2 m) of solid concrete. It has observation portals with specialized glass windows allowing for close observation of the launches.

== See also ==
- National Register of Historic Places listings in Doña Ana County, New Mexico
- List of National Historic Landmarks in New Mexico
