= R-1 (missile) =

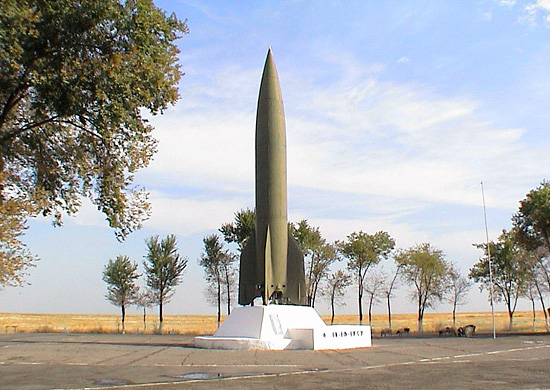
- Replica R-1 at Znamensk City
- Type: Tactical ballistic missile
- Place of origin: USSR

Service history
- In service: 28 November 1950

Production history
- Manufacturer: OKB-586 (Dnepropetrovsk)
- Produced: May 10, 1951

Specifications
- Mass: 13,430 kg (29,610 lb)
- Length: 14,650 mm (48 ft 1 in)
- Diameter: 1,650 mm (5 ft 5 in)
- Wingspan: 3,560 mm (11 ft 8 in)
- Engine: Liquid rocket engine 27,200 kgf (267,000 N; 60,000 lbf)
- Propellant: 3,810 kg (8,400 lb) 75% ethanol; 25% water; 4,910 kg (10,820 lb) liquid oxygen
- Operational range: 270 km (170 mi)
- Accuracy: 5 km

The R-1 rocket (NATO reporting name SS-1 Scunner, Soviet code name SA11, GRAU index 8A11) was a tactical ballistic missile, the first manufactured in the Soviet Union, and closely based on the German V-2 rocket. The R-1 missile system entered into service in the Soviet Army on 28 November 1950. Deployed largely against NATO, it was never an effective strategic weapon. Nevertheless, production and launching of the R-1 gave the Soviets valuable experience which later enabled the USSR to construct its own much more capable rockets.

== History ==
In 1945 the Soviets captured several key A-4 (V-2) rocket production facilities, and also gained the services of some German scientists and engineers related to the project. In particular the Soviets gained control of the main V-2 manufacturing facility at Nordhausen. Under the supervision of the Special technical Commission (OTK) established by the Soviet Union to oversee rocketry operations in Germany, A-4s were assembled and studied. This prompted the 13 May 1946 decree of the Soviet Council of Ministers for, in part, the development of a Soviet copy of the A-4, which would be the first domestically produced ballistic missile. A further decree on 16 May converted the M.I. Kalinin Plant No. 88, which had produced artillery and tanks during World War II into NII-88, tasked with managing the Soviet Union's long-range rocketry programs.

11 A-4s, six of them assembled at NII-88, the other five at Nordhausen, all by German engineers and technicians, were launched from the Soviet launch site Kapustin Yar in 1947. Only five of the rockets reached their target, roughly the same reliability the rocket had had under the Germans during the war. The experience derived from assembling and launching these rockets was directly applied to the Soviet copy, called the R-1, production of which was authorized by Josef Stalin in April 1947. NII-88 chief designer Sergei Korolev oversaw the R-1's development.

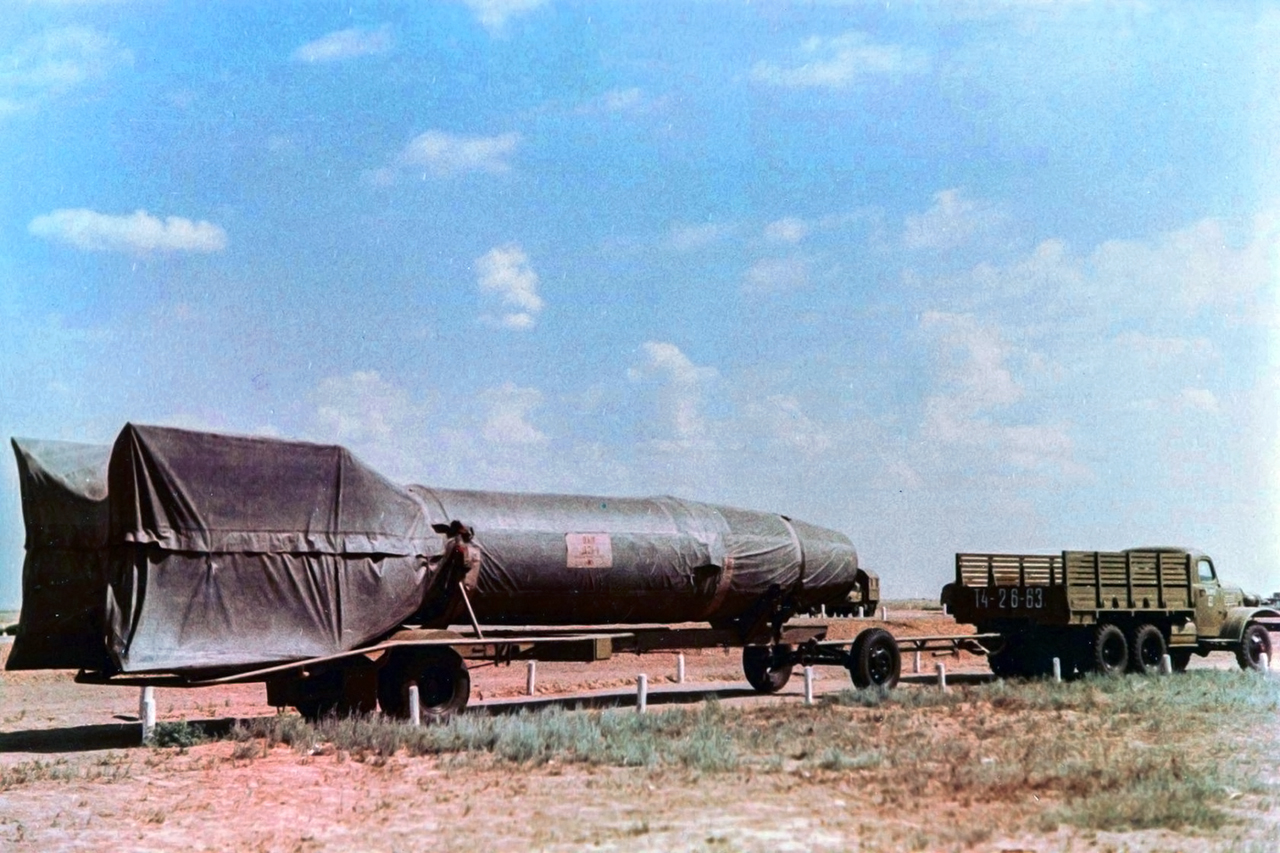
The first A4 rocket (from German stocks) is transported to the launch site on a truck trailer. It was launched on 18 October 1947 from the Kapustin Yar test site

== Description and development ==
Drawing of the Soviet R-1 missile, NATO code SS-1 Scunner

Though the R-1 was a close copy of the German A-4, it was ultimately considerably more reliable than its predecessor thanks to improvements made on the original design. The rocket was 14,650 mm (577 in) in length and weighing 13.5 tons. 9.2 tons of the R-1's mass was devoted to propellant: 4 tons of ethyl alcohol and 5 tons of liquid oxygen, which fed the Soviet-designed RD-100 engine. The R-1 missile could carry a 785-kilogram (1,731 lb) warhead of conventional explosive to a maximum range of 270 kilometres (170 mi), with an accuracy of about 5 kilometres (3.1 mi). a range slightly greater than that of the A-4.

The first tests of the missile began 13 September 1948. This first series revealed a variety of unforeseen issues that affected launch reliability and target accuracy. Six of the ten rockets in this series refused to leave the launch pad at all. Remedial improvements along with experimental design upgrades were made in 1949, with a second series of twenty tests starting in September and October. Launch reliability was 100% and only two missiles failed to reach their targets. The R-1 missile system entered into service in the Soviet Army on 28 November 1950.

The R-1A, a variant of the R-1 with a separable warhead, was tested in 1949. This development was largely in service of the upcoming R-2 (missile), a rocket with the same payload and twice the range of the R-1.

Even after adoption by the Soviet military, reliability of the R-1 remained problematic. The R-1's insulated electrical wiring attracted vermin. In one January 1953 incident, thousands of flood-displaced mice disabled many rockets by eating the insulation, requiring "hundreds of cats and repairmen". Moreover, 10-20% of the missiles launched broke up on reentry—a problem that had also plagued the A-4 in German service. This was traced, in 1954, to heating of the TNT warhead, evaporation of which caused the payload housing to rupture, which in turn, detonated the warhead. This issue was solved in the R-2 and later Soviet rockets through the use of the separable nosecone.

== Military service ==
Just three R-1 brigades, each equipped with six launchers with mobile platforms, were fielded. The first, the 23rd brigade (BON RVGK), was activated in December 1950 and deployed to Kamishin in Volgograd oblast the following month. This unit was later deployed to Belokovorovich in Ukraine; Šiauliai in Lithuania; Dzhambul, Kazakhstan, Ordzhonikidze, Armenia, the Far East, and the Primorsk area. Two other brigades, the 77th and 90th, were formed at Lviv, Khmelnytskyi, and Zhytomyr, Ukraine. They were transferred to the Land Forces in August 1958. Though the R-1 was essentially useless as a weapon against NATO, against which it was almost exclusively deployed, it was, nevertheless, invaluable in laying the foundation of the Soviet rocket industry.

== R-1 sounding rockets ==
High-altitude scientific experiments were conducted with the last two of the R-1As in 1949, and afterward a series of specialized scientific R-1 variants was developed: The R-1B, R-1V, R-1D, and R-1E. Some carried experiments to analyze the upper atmosphere, measure cosmic rays and take far-UV spectra of the Sun. Others carried biological payloads.

Between 22 July 1951 and 14 June 1956, the Soviets launched fifteen of these variant R-1s carrying a pair of dogs as payload. Three of the missions were failures resulting in the death of the animals. The 22 July 1951 launch of an R-1V marked the first time dogs were ever launched into space and recovered, preceding the first American success by two weeks.

== Operators ==
Soviet Union

- Soviet Army

== See also ==
- German influence on Soviet rocketry
- V-2 sounding rocket
- R-2 (missile)
- List of missiles
- Spaceflight before 1951
- Soviet rocketry
- Strategic Rocket Forces
