= Spaceflight before 1951 =

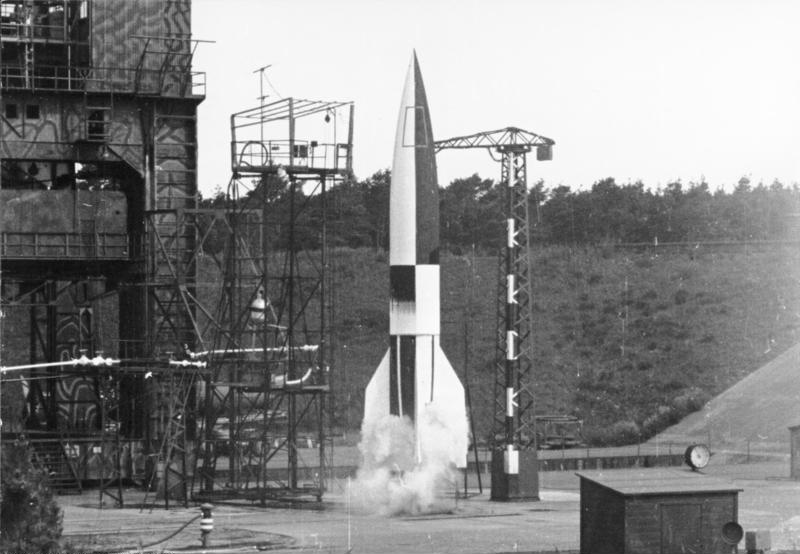
- Launch of a V-2 from Peenemünde

National firsts
- Spaceflight: Germany (1944); United States (1946); Soviet Union (1948)

Rockets
- Maiden flights: (Nazi Germany) V-2; (United States) Bumper; (United States) Viking (first model); (United States) Aerobee RTV-N-8; (United States) Aerobee RTV-N-10; (United States) Aerobee XASR-SC-1; (United States) Aerobee XASR-SC-2; (United States) Aerobee RTV-A-1; (Soviet Union) R-1; (Soviet Union) R-1A; (Soviet Union) R-2E; (Soviet Union) R-2
- Retirements: (United States) Bumper; (United States) Aerobee RTV-N-8; (Soviet Union) R-1A; (Soviet Union) R-2E

Spaceflight before 1951

Spaceflight as a practical endeavor began during World War II with the development of operational liquid-fueled rockets. Beginning life as a weapon, the V-2 was pressed into peaceful service after the war at the United States' White Sands Missile Range as well as the Soviet Union's Kapustin Yar. This led to a flourishing of missile designs setting the stage for the exploration of space. The small American WAC Corporal rocket was evolved into the Aerobee, a much more powerful sounding rocket. Exploration of space began in earnest in 1947 with the flight of the first Aerobee, 46 of which had flown by the end of 1950. These and other rockets, both Soviet and American, returned the first direct data on air density, temperature, charged particles and magnetic fields in the Earth's upper atmosphere.

By 1948, the United States Navy had evolved the V-2 design into the Viking capable of more than 100 miles (160 km) in altitude. The first Viking to accomplish this feat, number four, did so 10 May 1950. The Soviet Union developed a virtual copy of the V-2 called the R-1, which first flew in 1948. Its longer-ranged successor, the R-2, entered military service in 1950. This event marked the entry of both superpowers into the post-V-2 rocketry era.

== Origins and rocket development ==
The era of spaceflight began in 1942 with the development of the V-2 rocket (A-4) as a ballistic missile by Germany, the first vehicle capable of reaching the 100 kilometres (62 mi) boundary of space (as defined by the World Air Sports Federation). On 20 June 1944, a V-2 (MW 18014) was launched vertically, reaching a height of 174.6 kilometres (108.5 mi).

The post-war years saw rapid development in rocket technology by both superpowers, jumpstarted by the dozens of V-2s and hundreds of German specialists that ended up in the custody of the Soviet Union and the United States. The V-2, designed for carrying a warhead horizontally rather than vertical science missions, made an inefficient sounding rocket, while the wartime American WAC Corporal sounding rocket was too small to carry much scientific equipment. In 1946, the US Navy began development of its own heavy sounding rocket, the Viking, derived in part from the V-2. The Aerobee was developed from the WAC Corporal to loft lighter payloads.

The Soviet Union began military development of the R-1, a copy of the V-2 with modifications intended to improve reliability, in 1947. Flight testing of this first Soviet-made liquid-fueled missile began on 13 September 1948, and the rocket entered military service in 1950. Also from 1947, two advanced rockets with ranges of 600 kilometres (370 mi), the German émigré-designed G-1 (or R-10) and the Russian-designed R-2, competed for limited engineering and production staff, the latter winning out by the end of 1949 and being put into service in 1951. The draft plan for the 3,000 kilometres (1,900 mi) range R-3 was approved on 7 December 1949, though it was never developed, later designs proving more useful and achievable.

== Space exploration ==
=== V-2, WAC Corporal, and R-1A ===
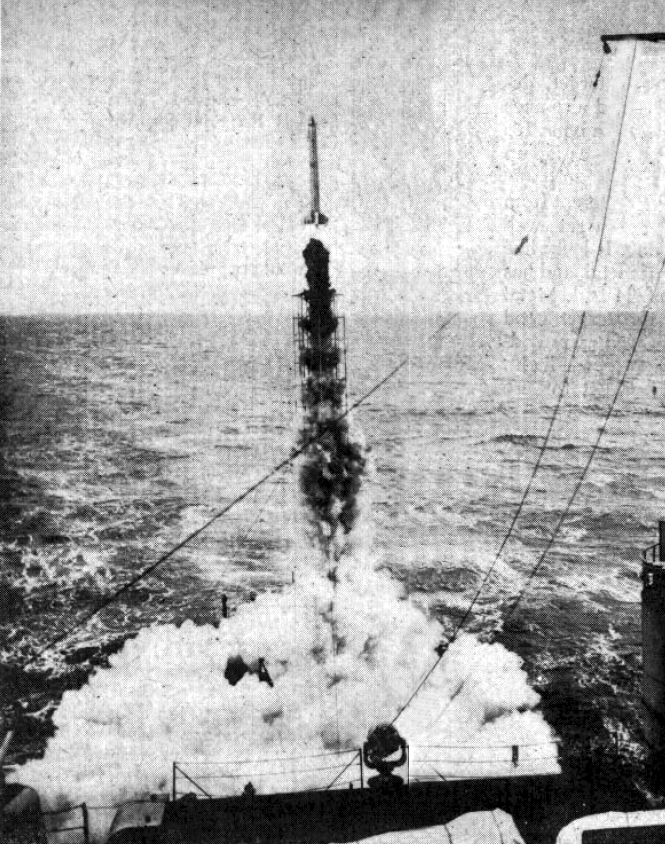
Aerobee launch at sea

The V-2s captured from Germany at the end of World War II were used for engineering and scientific missions by the United States and the Soviet Union. The first 25 captured V-2s were launched in the 15 months commencing 15 March 1946. By the end of 1950, more than 60 had been launched by the Americans, most of them equipped with research instruments. The first biological payloads launched to high altitude were sent on V-2s, starting with seeds and fruit flies in 1947, followed by mice and monkeys from 1948 onward.

The V-2 was also used in early experiments with two-stage rockets: Project Bumper combined the V-2 as first stage with the WAC Corporal as second stage. On 24 February 1949, Bumper 5 set an altitude record of 417 kilometres (259 mi). Around 10 WAC Corporals were also launched on their own in this period.

The Soviet Union launched 11 captured V-2s in 1947. Three of the V-2s launched by the USSR in 1947 carried 500 kilograms (1,100 lb) experiment packages for measuring cosmic rays at high altitude; at least one returned usable data. Two Soviet R-1As (an experimental R-1 variant that tested nose cone separation at altitude) also carried scientific equipment during test launches in 1949, but neither returned usable data.

=== Aerobee ===
First launched on 24 November 1947, the solid/liquid-fuel hybrid Aerobee quickly secured a reputation for reliability. With the development of these first generation purpose-built sounding rockets, the exploration of Earth's upper atmosphere and the nearest reaches of space began in earnest, a total of 46 Aerobee flights being launched through 1950. Aerobee flights measured the velocity and density of cosmic rays above 70 miles (110 km) and made high altitude measurements of the Earth's magnetic field. Cameras mounted on Aerobee rockets returned the first high quality photographs from space of sizeable regions of the Earth as well as large scale cloud formations.

=== Viking ===
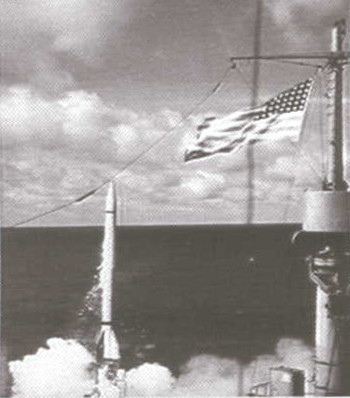
Launch of Viking 4

Vikings 1 and 2, launched in 1949 from White Sands Missile Range in New Mexico, both suffered from premature engine cutoff due to turbine leaks, significantly reducing their maximum altitude. The improved Viking 3, launched on 9 February 1950, reached 50 mi (80 km) and could have gone higher. However, after 34 seconds of accurately guided flight, the rocket veered westward and had to be destroyed by range safety.

On 10 May 1950, Viking 4 was launched from a site in the Pacific Ocean between Jarvis Island and Christmas Island. The fourth Viking became the first sounding rocket ever launched from a sea-going vessel, the USS Norton Sound. This flight was perfect, reaching 106.4 mi (171.2 km), more than double that reached by the earlier Vikings.

Viking 5, launched on 21 November 1950, carried a vast array of radiation detectors. The rocket also carried two movie cameras to take high altitude film of the Earth all the way to its peak height of 108 miles (174 km) as well as Pirani gauges to measure air densities in the upper atmosphere. Viking 6, launched on 11 December, underperformed, reaching a maximum altitude of 40 miles (64 km).

== Launches ==
- ← 1942
- 1943
- 1944
- 1945
- 1946
- 1947
- 1948
- 1949
- 1950 →

=== 1942 ===
1942 launches
Date and time (UTC)	Rocket	Flight number	Launch site		LSP	
Date and time (UTC)	Payload	Operator	Orbit	Function	Decay (UTC)	Outcome
Date and time (UTC)	Remarks					
13 June — 12 December	(Nazi Germany) V-2		(Nazi Germany) Peenemünde		(Nazi Germany) Wehrmacht	
13 June — 12 December		Wehrmacht	Suborbital	Missile test	Same day	Mixed
13 June — 12 December	7 V-2 rockets launched on test flights, 3 successfully					

=== 1943 ===
1943 launches
Date and time (UTC)	Rocket	Flight number	Launch site		LSP	
Date and time (UTC)	Payload	Operator	Orbit	Function	Decay (UTC)	Outcome
Date and time (UTC)	Remarks					
7 January — 30 December	(Nazi Germany) V-2		(Nazi Germany) Peenemünde, Heidelager		(Nazi Germany) Wehrmacht	
7 January — 30 December		Wehrmacht	Suborbital	Missile test	Same day	Mixed
7 January — 30 December	39 V-2 rockets launched on test flights; at least 9 failures					

=== 1944 ===
1944 launches
Date and time (UTC)	Rocket	Flight number	Launch site		LSP	
Date and time (UTC)	Payload	Operator	Orbit	Function	Decay (UTC)	Outcome
Date and time (UTC)	Remarks					
20 June	(Nazi Germany) V-2		(Nazi Germany) Greifswalder Oie		(Nazi Germany) Wehrmacht	
20 June	(Nazi Germany) MW 18014	Wehrmacht	Suborbital	Missile test	20 June	Successful
20 June	First artificial object to cross 100 km (the boundary of space per the FAI). Vertical test, apogee: 174.6 kilometres (108.5 mi)					
8 September	(Nazi Germany) V-2		(Nazi Germany) Houffalize		(Nazi Germany) Wehrmacht	
8 September		Wehrmacht	Suborbital	Missile attack	8 September	Successful
8 September	First combat usage of V-2 after more than a hundred test flights; ~3000 combat launches followed until March 1945 (see List of V-2 test launches)					

=== 1945 ===
1945 launches
Date and time (UTC)	Rocket	Flight number	Launch site		LSP	
Date and time (UTC)	Payload	Operator	Orbit	Function	Decay (UTC)	Outcome
Date and time (UTC)	Remarks					
2 October; 13:41	(Nazi Germany) V-2		(Allied-occupied Germany) Cuxhaven		(United Kingdom) UK military	
2 October; 13:41			Suborbital		2 October	Successful
2 October; 13:41	First launch of Operation Backfire; apogee: 69.4 kilometres (43.1 mi)					
4 October; 13:15	(Nazi Germany) V-2		(Allied-occupied Germany) Cuxhaven		(United Kingdom) UK military	
4 October; 13:15			Suborbital		4 October	Partial failure
4 October; 13:15	Apogee: 17.4 kilometres (10.8 mi)					
15 October; 14:06	(Nazi Germany) V-2		(Allied-occupied Germany) Cuxhaven		(United Kingdom) UK military	
15 October; 14:06			Suborbital		15 October	Successful
15 October; 14:06	Press and international observers present; Apogee: 64 kilometres (40 mi)					

=== 1946 ===
1946 launches
Date and time (UTC)	Rocket	Flight number	Launch site		LSP	
Date and time (UTC)	Payload	Operator	Orbit	Function	Decay (UTC)	Outcome
Date and time (UTC)	Remarks					
16 April; 21:47	(Nazi Germany) V-2	V-2 No. 2	(United States) White Sands LC-33		(United States) General Electric / US Army	
16 April; 21:47		WSPG	Suborbital	Cosmic Radiation (Applied Physics Laboratory)	16 April	Launch failure
16 April; 21:47	First launch of Project Hermes, apogee: 8 kilometres (5.0 mi), guidance failure; carried Geiger counter designed by James Van Allen					
10 May; 21:15	(Nazi Germany) V-2	V-2 No. 3	(United States) White Sands LC-33		(United States) GE / US Army	
10 May; 21:15		WSPG	Suborbital	Cosmic Radiation (APL)	10 May	Successful
10 May; 21:15	Project Hermes launch, apogee: 112 kilometres (70 mi), First US spaceflight					
29 May; 21:12	(Nazi Germany) V-2	V-2 No. 4	(United States) White Sands LC-33		(United States) GE / US Army	
29 May; 21:12		GE	Suborbital	Cosmic Radiation (APL)	29 May	Successful
29 May; 21:12	Project Hermes launch, apogee: 112 kilometres (70 mi)					
13 June; 23:40	(Nazi Germany) V-2	V-2 No. 5	(United States) White Sands LC-33		(United States) GE / US Army	
13 June; 23:40		GE	Suborbital	Solar Radiation / Ionospheric (Naval Research Laboratory)	13 June	Successful
13 June; 23:40	Project Hermes launch, apogee: 117 kilometres (73 mi)					
28 June; 19:25	(Nazi Germany) V-2	V-2 No. 6	(United States) White Sands LC-33		(United States) GE / US Army	
28 June; 19:25		NRL	Suborbital	Cosmic Radiation / Solar Radiation / Aeronomy / Ionospheric	28 June	Successful
28 June; 19:25	Project Hermes launch, apogee: 108 kilometres (67 mi)					
9 July; 19:25	(Nazi Germany) V-2	V-2 No. 7	(United States) White Sands LC-33		(United States) GE / US Army	
9 July; 19:25		GE	Suborbital	Cosmic Radiation / Ionospheric (NRL) / Biological (Harvard University)	9 July	Successful
9 July; 19:25	Project Hermes launch, apogee: 134 kilometres (83 mi), sent seeds to space					
19 July; 19:11	(Nazi Germany) V-2	V-2 No. 8	(United States) White Sands LC-33		(United States) GE / US Army	
19 July; 19:11		GE	Suborbital	Ionospheric (NRL)	19 July	Launch failure
19 July; 19:11	Project Hermes launch, apogee: 4.8 kilometres (3.0 mi), explosion at 28.5 seconds					
30 July; 19:36	(Nazi Germany) V-2	V-2 No. 9	(United States) White Sands LC-33		(United States) GE / US Army	
30 July; 19:36		APL	Suborbital	Cosmic Radiation / Ionospheric (NRL)	30 July	Successful
30 July; 19:36	Project Hermes launch, apogee: 167 kilometres (104 mi)					
15 August; 18:00	(Nazi Germany) V-2	V-2 No. 10	(United States) White Sands LC-33		(United States) GE / US Army	
15 August; 18:00		Princeton University	Suborbital	Cosmic Radiation / Ionospheric	15 August	Launch failure
15 August; 18:00	Project Hermes launch, apogee: 3.2 kilometres (2.0 mi), guidance failure at 13.9 seconds					
22 August; 17:15	(Nazi Germany) V-2	V-2 No. 11	(United States) White Sands LC-33		(United States) GE / US Army	
22 August; 17:15		University of Michigan	Suborbital	Aeronomy / Ionospheric / Sky Brightness	22 August	Launch failure
22 August; 17:15	Project Hermes launch, apogee: 0.1 kilometres (0.062 mi), guidance failure immediately after lift					
10 October; 18:02	(Nazi Germany) V-2	V-2 No. 12	(United States) White Sands LC-33		(United States) GE / US Army	
10 October; 18:02		NRL	Suborbital	Cosmic Radiation / Solar Spectroscopy / Aeronomy / Ionospheric / Biological (Harvard)	10 October	Successful
10 October; 18:02	Project Hermes launch, apogee: 164 kilometres (102 mi), launched with seeds and cross jet attenuation transmitter and receiver					
24 October; 19:15	(Nazi Germany) V-2	V-2 No. 13	(United States) White Sands LC-33		(United States) GE / US Army	
24 October; 19:15		APL	Suborbital	Cosmic Radiation / Solar UV / Aeronomy / Photography	24 October	Successful
24 October; 19:15	Project Hermes launch, apogee: 105 kilometres (65 mi), first photo of Earth from space, short burning time (59 sec)					
7 November; 20:31	(Nazi Germany) V-2	V-2 No. 14	(United States) White Sands LC-33		(United States) GE / US Army	
7 November; 20:31		Princeton University	Suborbital	Cosmic Radiation	7 November	Launch failure
7 November; 20:31	Project Hermes launch, apogee: 0.4 kilometres (0.25 mi). Guidance failure at 2 seconds, missile turned sideways, flew horizontal and was destroyed.					
21 November; 16:55	(Nazi Germany) V-2	V-2 No. 15	(United States) White Sands LC-33		(United States) GE / US Army	
21 November; 16:55		Watson Laboratories / University of Michigan	Suborbital	Aeronomy / Ionospheric / Sky Brightness / Voltage Breakdown	21 November	Successful
21 November; 16:55	Project Hermes launch, apogee: 102 kilometres (63 mi)					
5 December; 20:08	(Nazi Germany) V-2	V-2 No. 16	(United States) White Sands LC-33		(United States) GE / US Army	
5 December; 20:08		NRL	Suborbital	Cosmic Radiation / Solar UV / Aeronomy / Photography	5 December	Successful
5 December; 20:08	Project Hermes launch, apogee: 167 kilometres (104 mi), guidance problems					
18 December; 05:12	(Nazi Germany) V-2	V-2 No. 17	(United States) White Sands LC-33		(United States) GE / US Army	
18 December; 05:12	(United States) Grenades	APL	Suborbital	Cosmic Radiation / Meteor Research / Biological (National Institute of Health)	18 December	Successful
18 December; 05:12	Project Hermes launch, apogee: 187 kilometres (116 mi), first night flight of a V-2. Released artificial meteors for photographic observation. Carried fungus spores. Extraordinary range due to guidance failure.					

=== 1947 ===
1947 launches
Date and time (UTC)	Rocket	Flight number	Launch site		LSP	
Date and time (UTC)	Payload	Operator	Orbit	Function	Decay (UTC)	Outcome
Date and time (UTC)	Remarks					
10 January; 21:13	(Nazi Germany) V-2	V-2 No. 18	(United States) White Sands LC-33		(United States) GE / US Army	
10 January; 21:13		NRL	Suborbital	Cosmic Radiation	10 January	Successful
10 January; 21:13	Project Hermes launch, apogee: 116 kilometres (72 mi), roll at 40 seconds					
24 January; 00:22	(Nazi Germany) V-2	V-2 No. 19	(United States) White Sands LC-33		(United States) GE / US Army	
24 January; 00:22		GE	Suborbital	Test Guidance System / Hermes A-2 Telemetry System Test	24 January	Successful
24 January; 00:22	Project Hermes launch, apogee: 50 kilometres (31 mi)					
20 February; 18:16	(Nazi Germany) V-2	V-2 No. 20	(United States) White Sands LC-33		(United States) GE / US Army	
20 February; 18:16	(United States) Blossom I	Air Materiel Command	Suborbital	Aeronomy (University of Michigan) / Ionospheric (AFCRC, University of Michigan) / Sky Brightness / Voltage Breakdown (AFCRC) / Biological	20 February	Successful
20 February; 18:16	Project Hermes launch, apogee: 109 kilometres (68 mi), guidance disturbance at 27 sec, roll at 37.5 seconds. Flew with rye seeds, cotton seeds, and fruit flies, the first animals in space. First soft landing of a man-made object from space.					
7 March; 18:23	(Nazi Germany) V-2	V-2 No. 21	(United States) White Sands LC-33		(United States) GE / US Army	
7 March; 18:23		NRL	Suborbital	Cosmic Radiation / Aeronomy / Solar Radiation / Ionospheric (NRL) / Biological (Harvard)	7 March	Successful
7 March; 18:23	Project Hermes launch, apogee: 161 kilometres (100 mi), sent seeds to space					
1 April; 20:10	(Nazi Germany) V-2	V-2 No. 22	(United States) White Sands LC-33		(United States) GE / US Army	
1 April; 20:10		APL	Suborbital	Cosmic Radiation / Solar UV (APL, Yerkes Observatory) / Photography	1 April	Successful
1 April; 20:10	Project Hermes launch, apogee: 129 kilometres (80 mi)					
9 April; 00:10	(Nazi Germany) V-2	V-2 No. 23	(United States) White Sands LC-33		(United States) GE / US Army	
9 April; 00:10		APL	Suborbital	Cosmic Radiation / Solar UV / Photography	9 April	Successful
9 April; 00:10	Project Hermes launch, apogee: 103 kilometres (64 mi)					
17 April; 23:22	(Nazi Germany) V-2	V-2 No. 24	(United States) White Sands LC-33		(United States) GE / US Army	
17 April; 23:22	(United States) Grenades	GE	Suborbital	Aeronomy (Signal Corps Engineering Laboratories)	17 April	Successful
17 April; 23:22	Project Hermes launch, apogee: 140 kilometres (87 mi), roll at 57.5 seconds					
15 May; 23:08	(Nazi Germany) V-2	V-2 No. 26	(United States) White Sands LC-33		(United States) GE / US Army	
15 May; 23:08	(United States) Grenades	NRL	Suborbital	Aeronomy (SCEL) / Cosmic Radiation / Solar Radiation / Ionospheric (NRL)	15 May	Successful
15 May; 23:08	Project Hermes launch, apogee: 122 kilometres (76 mi), steering trouble from lift					
29 May	(Nazi Germany) V-2		(United States) White Sands LC-33		(United States) GE / US Army	
29 May	(United States) Hermes II	GE	Suborbital	Test of ramjet diffusers called "Organ"	29 May	Launch failure
29 May	Project Hermes launch, apogee: 50 kilometres (31 mi), maiden flight of the Hermes II V-2 variant. Rocket flew south instead of north and landed in Mexico					
10 July; 19:18	(Nazi Germany) V-2	V-2 No. 29	(United States) White Sands LC-33		(United States) GE / US Army	
10 July; 19:18		NRL	Suborbital	Aeronomy / Cosmic Radiation / Ionospheric / Biological (Harvard College Observatory)	10 July	Launch failure
10 July; 19:18	Project Hermes launch, apogee: 16.3 kilometres (10.1 mi), steering trouble from lift, cutoff triggered at 32 seconds					
29 July; 12:55	(Nazi Germany) V-2	V-2 No. 30	(United States) White Sands LC-33		(United States) GE / US Army	
29 July; 12:55		APL	Suborbital	Cosmic Radiation / Solar UV / Photography	29 July	Successful
29 July; 12:55	Project Hermes launch, apogee: 159 kilometres (99 mi), vane #4 ceased to operate at 27 seconds					
6 September	(Nazi Germany) V-2		(United States) USS Midway, Atlantic Ocean, southeast of Bermuda		(United States) US Navy	
6 September		US Navy	Suborbital	Missile test	6 September	Launch failure
6 September	Operation Sandy, first shipboard missile launch, apogee: 1 kilometre (0.62 mi)					
9 October; 19:15	(Nazi Germany) V-2	V-2 No. 27	(United States) White Sands LC-33		(United States) GE / US Army	
9 October; 19:15		GE	Suborbital	Aeronomy (University of Michigan) / Solar UV (NRL)	9 October	Successful
9 October; 19:15	Project Hermes launch, apogee: 156 kilometres (97 mi), steering disturbance at 48.4 seconds, roll at 52 seconds					
18 October; 07:47	(Nazi Germany) V-2		(Soviet Union) Kapustin Yar		(Soviet Union) NII-88 Section 3	
18 October; 07:47		NII-88 Section 3	Suborbital	Missile test	28 October	Partial failure
18 October; 07:47	Apogee: 86 kilometres (53 mi); destroyed during ballistic portion of flight					
20 October; 07:47	(Nazi Germany) V-2		(Soviet Union) Kapustin Yar		(Soviet Union) NII-88 Section 3	
20 October; 07:47		NII-88 Section 3	Suborbital	Missile test	20 October	Partial failure
20 October; 07:47	Apogee: 85 kilometres (53 mi); tore loose from launch stand; flew 180 kilometres (110 mi) left of planned target					
23 October; 14:05	(Nazi Germany) V-2		(Soviet Union) Kapustin Yar		(Soviet Union) NII-88 Section 3	
23 October; 14:05		NII-88 Section 3	Suborbital	Missile test	23 October	Launch failure
23 October; 14:05	Apogee: 14 kilometres (8.7 mi); payload destroyed, rocket disintegrated					
28 October; 14:05	(Nazi Germany) V-2		(Soviet Union) Kapustin Yar		(Soviet Union) NII-88 Section 3	
28 October; 14:05		NII-88 Section 3	Suborbital	Missile test	28 October	Successful
28 October; 14:05	Apogee: 87 kilometres (54 mi)					
31 October; 13:41	(Nazi Germany) V-2		(Soviet Union) Kapustin Yar		(Soviet Union) NII-88 Section 3	
31 October; 13:41		NII-88 Section 3	Suborbital	Missile test	31 October	Launch failure
31 October; 13:41	Apogee: 0 kilometres (0 mi); loss of control on longitudinal axis					
2 November; 15:14	(Nazi Germany) V-2		(Soviet Union) Kapustin Yar		(Soviet Union) NII-88 Section 3	
2 November; 15:14		NII-88 Section 3	Suborbital	Missile test	2 November	Successful
2 November; 15:14	Apogee: 88 kilometres (55 mi)					
3 November; 12:05	(Nazi Germany) V-2		(Soviet Union) Kapustin Yar		(Soviet Union) NII-88 Section 3	
3 November; 12:05		NII-88 Section 3	Suborbital	Missile test	3 November	Launch failure
3 November; 12:05	Apogee: 0 kilometres (0 mi); rolled after launch and lost stabilization					
4 November; 15:02	(Nazi Germany) V-2		(Soviet Union) Kapustin Yar		(Soviet Union) NII-88 Section 3	
4 November; 15:02		NII-88 Section 3	Suborbital	Missile test	4 November	Successful
4 November; 15:02	Apogee: 89 kilometres (55 mi)					
10 November; 09:39	(Nazi Germany) V-2		(Soviet Union) Kapustin Yar		(Soviet Union) NII-88 Section 3	
10 November; 09:39		NII-88 Section 3	Suborbital	Missile test	10 November	Launch failure
10 November; 09:39	Apogee: 11 kilometres (6.8 mi); lost guidance					
13 November; 08:30	(Nazi Germany) V-2		(Soviet Union) Kapustin Yar		(Soviet Union) NII-88 Section 3	
13 November; 08:30		NII-88 Section 3	Suborbital	Missile test	13 November	Successful
13 November; 08:30	Apogee: 89 kilometres (55 mi)					
13 November; 14:00	(Nazi Germany) V-2		(Soviet Union) Kapustin Yar		(Soviet Union) NII-88 Section 3	
13 November; 14:00		NII-88 Section 3	Suborbital	Missile test	13 November	Partial failure
13 November; 14:00	Apogee: 89 kilometres (55 mi); broke up on re-entry					
20 November; 23:47	(Nazi Germany) V-2	GE Special	(United States) White Sands LC-33		(United States) GE / US Army	
20 November; 23:47		GE	Suborbital	Technology development flight for GE	20 November	Launch failure
20 November; 23:47	Project Hermes launch, apogee: 21 kilometres (13 mi), propulsion trouble at 36 seconds					
24 November; 17:20	(United States) Aerobee RTV-N-8	A4	(United States) White Sands LC-35		(United States) US Navy	
24 November; 17:20		APL	Suborbital	Cosmic Radiation	24 November	Launch failure
24 November; 17:20	Apogee: 55.8 kilometres (34.7 mi), maiden flight of the Aerobee RTV-N-8, although three booster tests with dummy upper stages occurred earlier in the year. Flew off course, flight terminated.					
8 December; 21:42	(Nazi Germany) V-2	V-2 No. 28	(United States) White Sands LC-33		(United States) GE / US Army	
8 December; 21:42	(United States) Blossom II	AMC	Suborbital	Aeronomy (University of Michigan, Boston University) / Solar X-Ray / Ionospheric (Boston University, WADC) / Sky Brightness (AFCRC)	8 December	Successful
8 December; 21:42	Project Hermes launch, apogee: 105 kilometres (65 mi)					

=== 1948 ===
1948 launches
Date and time (UTC)	Rocket	Flight number	Launch site		LSP	
Date and time (UTC)	Payload	Operator	Orbit	Function	Decay (UTC)	Outcome
Date and time (UTC)	Remarks					
22 January; 20:12	(Nazi Germany) V-2	V-2 No. 34	(United States) White Sands LC-33		(United States) GE / US Army	
22 January; 20:12		NRL	Suborbital	Aeronomy / Cosmic Radiation / Ionospheric	22 January	Successful
22 January; 20:12	Project Hermes launch, apogee: 159 kilometres (99 mi)					
6 February; 17:17	(Nazi Germany) V-2	V-2 No. 36	(United States) White Sands LC-33		(United States) GE / US Army	
6 February; 17:17		GE	Suborbital	Technology development flight for GE	6 February	Successful
6 February; 17:17	Project Hermes launch, apogee: 113 kilometres (70 mi)					
5 March; 22:51	(United States) Aerobee RTV-N-8	A5	(United States) White Sands LC-35		(United States) US Navy	
5 March; 22:51		APL	Suborbital	Cosmic Radiation	5 March	Successful
5 March; 22:51	Apogee: 117.5 kilometres (73.0 mi)					
19 March; 23:10	(Nazi Germany) V-2	V-2 No. 39	(United States) White Sands LC-33		(United States) GE / US Army	
19 March; 23:10	(United States) Blossom IIA	GE / University of Michigan	Suborbital	Aeronomy / Magnetic Field	19 March	Launch failure
19 March; 23:10	Project Hermes launch, apogee: 5.5 kilometres (3.4 mi), air pressure failure caused early burnout					
2 April; 13:47	(Nazi Germany) V-2	V-2 No. 25	(United States) White Sands LC-33		(United States) GE / US Army	
2 April; 13:47	(United States) Grenades	USASC / University of Michigan / NRL	Suborbital	Aeronomy / Cosmic Radiation / Solar UV	2 April	Successful
2 April; 13:47	Project Hermes launch, apogee: 144 kilometres (89 mi)					
13 April; 21:41	(United States) Aerobee RTV-N-8	A6	(United States) White Sands LC-35		(United States) US Navy	
13 April; 21:41		APL / NOL	Suborbital	Magnetic field research	13 April	Successful
13 April; 21:41	Apogee: 114.3 kilometres (71.0 mi)					
19 April; 19:54	(Nazi Germany) V-2	V-2 No. 38	(United States) White Sands LC-33		(United States) GE / US Army	
19 April; 19:54		NRL	Suborbital	Aeronomy / Cosmic Radiation / Solar UV / Ionospheric	19 April	Launch failure
19 April; 19:54	Project Hermes launch, apogee: 56 kilometres (35 mi), guidance failure caused erratic flight, and cutoff was triggered at 57.1 seconds					
13 May; 13:43	(Nazi Germany) (United States) Bumper		(United States) White Sands LC-33		(United States) GE / US Army	
13 May; 13:43	(United States) Bumper 1	GE	Suborbital	Solar / Ionosphere	13 May	Successful
13 May; 13:43	Maiden flight of Bumper, apogee: 127.6 kilometres (79.3 mi)					
27 May; 14:15	(Nazi Germany) V-2	V-2 No. 35	(United States) White Sands LC-33		(United States) GE / US Army	
27 May; 14:15		APL	Suborbital	Aeronomy / Cosmic Radiation / Solar UV / Photography	27 May	Successful
27 May; 14:15	Project Hermes launch, apogee: 140 kilometres (87 mi)					
11 June; 10:22	(Nazi Germany) V-2	V-2 No. 37	(United States) White Sands LC-33		(United States) GE / US Army	
11 June; 10:22	(United States) Blossom III	AMC	Suborbital	Solar X-Ray / Ionospheric / Sky Brightness / Aeronomy / Biological	11 June	Launch failure
11 June; 10:22	Project Hermes launch, apogee: 63 kilometres (39 mi), premature valve closure caused an early engine cutoff. Carried the monkey Albert I.					
26 July; 16:47	(United States) Aerobee RTV-N-8	A7	(United States) White Sands LC-35		(United States) US Navy	
26 July; 16:47		APL	Suborbital	Earth Imaging	26 July	Successful
26 July; 16:47	Apogee: 112.7 kilometres (70.0 mi)					
26 July; 18:03	(Nazi Germany) V-2	V-2 No. 40	(United States) White Sands LC-33		(United States) GE / US Army	
26 July; 18:03		APL	Suborbital	Cosmic Radiation / Aeronomy	26 July	Successful
26 July; 18:03	Project Hermes launch, apogee: 97 kilometres (60 mi), propulsion issues at 45.2 seconds					
5 August; 12:07	(Nazi Germany) V-2	V-2 No. 43	(United States) White Sands LC-33		(United States) GE / US Army	
5 August; 12:07		NRL	Suborbital	Aeronomy / Cosmic Radiation / Solar UV / Solar X-Ray / Ionospheric / Photography	5 August	Successful
5 August; 12:07	Project Hermes launch, apogee: 167 kilometres (104 mi)					
6 August; 01:37	(United States) Aerobee RTV-N-8	NRL 1	(United States) White Sands LC-35		(United States) US Navy	
6 August; 01:37		NRL	Suborbital	Solar Radiation / Aeronomy	6 August	Successful
6 August; 01:37	Apogee: 97 kilometres (60 mi)					
19 August; 14:45	(Nazi Germany) (United States) Bumper		(United States) White Sands LC-33		(United States) GE / US Army	
19 August; 14:45	(United States) Bumper 2	GE	Suborbital	Solar UV	19 August	Launch failure
19 August; 14:45	Apogee: 13.1 kilometres (8.1 mi)					
3 September; 01:00	(Nazi Germany) V-2	V-2 No. 33	(United States) White Sands LC-33		(United States) GE / US Army	
3 September; 01:00	(United States) Grenades	USASC / University of Michigan	Suborbital	Aeronomy	3 September	Successful
3 September; 01:00	Project Hermes launch, apogee: 151 kilometres (94 mi)					
17 September	(Soviet Union) R-1		(Soviet Union) Kapustin Yar		(Soviet Union) NII-88 Section 3	
17 September		NII-88 Section 3	Suborbital	Missile test	17 September	Launch failure
17 September	Maiden flight of the R-1					
30 September; 15:30	(Nazi Germany) (United States) Bumper		(United States) White Sands LC-33		(United States) GE / US Army	
30 September; 15:30	(United States) Bumper 3	GE	Suborbital	Solar UV / X-Ray	30 September	Launch failure
30 September; 15:30	Apogee: 150.6 kilometres (93.6 mi), 2nd stage failure					
10 October	(Soviet Union) R-1		(Soviet Union) Kapustin Yar		(Soviet Union) NII-88 Section 3	
10 October		NII-88 Section 3	Suborbital	Missile test	10 October	Successful
11 October	(Soviet Union) R-1		(Soviet Union) Kapustin Yar		(Soviet Union) NII-88 Section 3	
11 October		NII-88 Section 3	Suborbital	Missile test, sounding rocket	11 October	Successful
11 October	First Soviet spaceflight with scientific experiments					
13 October	(Soviet Union) R-1		(Soviet Union) Kapustin Yar		(Soviet Union) NII-88 Section 3	
13 October		NII-88 Section 3	Suborbital	Missile test	13 October	Successful
21 October	(Soviet Union) R-1		(Soviet Union) Kapustin Yar		(Soviet Union) NII-88 Section 3	
21 October		NII-88 Section 3	Suborbital	Missile test	21 October	Successful
23 October	(Soviet Union) R-1		(Soviet Union) Kapustin Yar		(Soviet Union) NII-88 Section 3	
23 October		NII-88 Section 3	Suborbital	Missile test	23 October	Successful
1 November; 14:24	(Nazi Germany) (United States) Bumper		(United States) White Sands LC-33		(United States) GE / US Army	
1 November; 14:24	(United States) Bumper 4	GE	Suborbital	Test flight	1 November	Launch failure
1 November; 14:24	Apogee: 5 kilometres (3.1 mi), tail explosion at 28.5 seconds					
1 November	(Soviet Union) R-1		(Soviet Union) Kapustin Yar		(Soviet Union) NII-88 Section 3	
1 November		NII-88 Section 3	Suborbital	Missile test	1 November	Successful
2 November; 00:15	(United States) Aerobee RTV-N-8	A8	(United States) White Sands LC-35		(United States) US Navy	
2 November; 00:15		APL / NRL	Suborbital	Cosmic Radiation / Solar X-Ray	2 November	Successful
2 November; 00:15	Apogee: 90.9 kilometres (56.5 mi)					
3 November	(Soviet Union) R-1		(Soviet Union) Kapustin Yar		(Soviet Union) NII-88 Section 3	
3 November		NII-88 Section 3	Suborbital	Missile test	3 November	Successful
4 November	(Soviet Union) R-1		(Soviet Union) Kapustin Yar		(Soviet Union) NII-88 Section 3	
4 November		NII-88 Section 3	Suborbital	Missile test	4 November	Successful
5 November	(Soviet Union) R-1		(Soviet Union) Kapustin Yar		(Soviet Union) NII-88 Section 3	
5 November		NII-88 Section 3	Suborbital	Missile test	5 November	Successful
5 November	Last of nine launches in the first test series					
18 November; 22:35	(Nazi Germany) V-2	V-2 No. 44	(United States) White Sands LC-33		(United States) GE / US Army	
18 November; 22:35		GE	Suborbital	Ramjet research / Aeronomy / Solar X-Ray / Biological	18 November	Successful
18 November; 22:35	Project Hermes launch, apogee: 145 kilometres (90 mi), carried seeds and tested a Hermes B-1 ramjet diffuser in place of the warhead					
9 December; 16:08	(Nazi Germany) V-2	V-2 No. 42	(United States) White Sands LC-33		(United States) GE / US Army	
9 December; 16:08		USASC	Suborbital	Aeronomy / Solar X-Ray / Biological	9 December	Successful
9 December; 16:08	Project Hermes launch, apogee: 108 kilometres (67 mi), carried seeds					
9 December; 22:38	(United States) Aerobee XASR-SC-1	SC 1	(United States) White Sands LC-35		(United States) US Army	
9 December; 22:38		USASC / University of Michigan	Suborbital	Aeronomy	9 December	Successful
9 December; 22:38	Apogee: 91.6 kilometres (56.9 mi), maiden flight of the XASR-SC-1					

=== 1949 ===
1949 launches
Date and time (UTC)	Rocket	Flight number	Launch site		LSP	
Date and time (UTC)	Payload	Operator	Orbit	Function	Decay (UTC)	Outcome
Date and time (UTC)	Remarks					
14 January; 20:26	(Nazi Germany) V-2		(United States) White Sands LC-33		(United States) US Army	
14 January; 20:26	(United States) Hermes II	US Army	Suborbital	Missile test	14 January	Launch failure
14 January; 20:26	Project Hermes launch, apogee: 1 kilometre (0.62 mi)					
28 January; 17:20	(Nazi Germany) V-2	V-2 No. 45	(United States) White Sands LC-33		(United States) GE / US Army	
28 January; 17:20		NRL	Suborbital	Aeronomy / Cosmic Radiation / Solar Radiation / Ionospheric / Photography / Biological	28 January	Launch failure
28 January; 17:20	Project Hermes launch, apogee: 60 kilometres (37 mi), carried seeds. Poor propulsion and control, fuel cutoff triggered at 56.4 seconds.					
29 January; 06:17	(United States) Aerobee RTV-N-8	NRL 2	(United States) White Sands LC-35		(United States) US Navy	
29 January; 06:17		NRL	Suborbital	Cosmic Radiation / Aeronomy / Ionospheric / Solar X-Ray	29 January	Successful
29 January; 06:17	Apogee: 97 kilometres (60 mi)					
1 February; 18:38	(United States) Aerobee RTV-N-8	NRL 3	(United States) White Sands LC-35		(United States) US Navy	
1 February; 18:38		NRL	Suborbital	Solar UV / Solar X-Ray	1 February	Launch failure
1 February; 18:38	Apogee: 0 kilometres (0 mi), booster exploded at ignition					
17 February; 17:00	(Nazi Germany) V-2	V-2 No. 48	(United States) White Sands LC-33		(United States) GE / US Army	
17 February; 17:00		APL	Suborbital	Aeronomy / Cosmic Radiation / Solar UV / Photography / Biological	17 February	Successful
17 February; 17:00	Project Hermes launch, apogee: 127 kilometres (79 mi), carried fruit flies					
24 February; 22:14	(Nazi Germany) (United States) Bumper		(United States) White Sands LC-33		(United States) GE / US Army	
24 February; 22:14	(United States) Bumper 5	GE	Suborbital	Aeronomy	24 February	Successful
24 February; 22:14	Apogee: 393 kilometres (244 mi). The new altitude record.					
2 March; 00:15	(United States) Aerobee RTV-N-8	A9	(United States) White Sands LC-35		(United States) US Navy	
2 March; 00:15		APL	Suborbital	Test for shipboard launch	2 March	Successful
2 March; 00:15	Dummy firing to evaluate shipboard launching procedures					
17 March; 23:20	(United States) Aerobee RTV-N-8	A10	(United States) USS Norton Sound, Pacific Ocean near South America		(United States) US Navy	
17 March; 23:20		APL	Suborbital	Ionospheric	17 March	Successful
17 March; 23:20	Apogee: 105 kilometres (65 mi)					
22 March; 06:43	(Nazi Germany) V-2	V-2 No. 41	(United States) White Sands LC-33		(United States) GE / US Army	
22 March; 06:43	(United States) Blossom IVA	AMC	Suborbital	Aeronomy / Solar X-Ray / Imaging / Ionospheric	22 March	Successful
22 March; 06:43	Project Hermes launch, apogee: 129 kilometres (80 mi)					
22 March; 17:30	(United States) Aerobee RTV-N-8	A11	(United States) USS Norton Sound, Pacific Ocean near South America		(United States) US Navy	
22 March; 17:30		APL	Suborbital	Ionospheric	22 March	Successful
22 March; 17:30	Apogee: 105 kilometres (65 mi)					
24 March; 15:14	(United States) Aerobee RTV-N-8	A12	(United States) USS Norton Sound, Pacific Ocean near South America		(United States) US Navy	
24 March; 15:14		APL	Suborbital	Cosmic Radiation	24 March	Launch failure
24 March; 15:14	Apogee: 6.0 kilometres (3.7 mi), pressure valve malfunction, booster separated on ignition					
11 April; 22:05	(Nazi Germany) V-2	V-2 No. 50	(United States) White Sands LC-33		(United States) GE / US Army	
11 April; 22:05		USASC	Suborbital	Aeronomy / Solar X-Ray / Biological	11 April	Successful
11 April; 22:05	Project Hermes launch, apogee: 85 kilometres (53 mi), carried seeds and bacteria					
22 April; 00:17	(Nazi Germany) (United States) Bumper		(United States) White Sands LC-33		(United States) GE / US Army	
22 April; 00:17	(United States) Bumper 6	GE	Suborbital	Solar / Aeronomy	22 April	Launch failure
22 April; 00:17	Apogee: 50 kilometres (31 mi)					
3 May; 16:14	(United States) Viking (first model)		(United States) White Sands LC-33 – Army Launch Area 1		(United States) US Navy	
3 May; 16:14	(United States) Viking 1	NRL	Suborbital	Aeronomy / Imaging	3 May	Partial launch failure
3 May; 16:14	Apogee: 83 kilometres (52 mi)					
5 May; 15:15	(Nazi Germany) V-2	V-2 No. 46	(United States) White Sands LC-33		(United States) GE / US Army	
5 May; 15:15		GE	Suborbital	Technology development for GE / Solar Radiation	5 May	Launch failure
5 May; 15:15	Project Hermes launch, apogee: 8.77 kilometres (5.45 mi), carried a Hermes B-1 ramjet diffuser in place of the warhead. Premature cutoff at 25.5 seconds.					
7 May; 03:12	(Soviet Union) R-1A		(Soviet Union) Kapustin Yar		(Soviet Union) NII-88 Section 3	
7 May; 03:12		NII-88 Section 3	Suborbital	Missile test	7 May	Successful
7 May; 03:12	Apogee: 109 kilometres (68 mi), maiden flight of R-1A, tested separable warhead					
10 May; 15:57	(Soviet Union) R-1A		(Soviet Union) Kapustin Yar		(Soviet Union) NII-88 Section 3	
10 May; 15:57		NII-88 Section 3	Suborbital	Missile test	10 May	Successful
10 May; 15:57	Tested separable warhead					
15 May; 02:48	(Soviet Union) R-1A		(Soviet Union) Kapustin Yar		(Soviet Union) NII-88 Section 3	
15 May; 02:48		NII-88 Section 3	Suborbital	Missile test	15 May	Successful
15 May; 02:48	Tested separable warhead					
16 May; 21:55	(Soviet Union) R-1A		(Soviet Union) Kapustin Yar		(Soviet Union) NII-88 Section 3	
16 May; 21:55		NII-88 Section 3	Suborbital	Missile test	16 May	Successful
16 May; 21:55	Tested separable warhead					
24 May; 01:40	(Soviet Union) R-1A		(Soviet Union) Kapustin Yar		(Soviet Union) NII-88 Section 3	
24 May; 01:40	(Soviet Union) FIAR-1	NII-88 Section 3	Suborbital	Missile test / Aeronomy	24 May	Partial Failure
24 May; 01:40	Vertical flight, tested separable warhead, carried aeronomy experiments that were not recovered					
28 May; 01:50	(Soviet Union) R-1A		(Soviet Union) Kapustin Yar		(Soviet Union) NII-88 Section 3	
28 May; 01:50	(Soviet Union) FIAR-1	NII-88 Section 3	Suborbital	Missile test / Aeronomy	28 May	Partial Failure
28 May; 01:50	Final R-1A flight; vertical flight, tested separable warhead, carried aeronomy experiments damaged on landing and returned no usable data					
2 June; 13:10	(United States) Aerobee XASR-SC-1	SC 2	(United States) White Sands LC-35		(United States) US Army	
2 June; 13:10		USASC / University of Michigan	Suborbital	Aeronomy	2 June	Successful
2 June; 13:10	Apogee: 78.4 kilometres (48.7 mi)					
14 June; 22:35	(Nazi Germany) V-2	V-2 No. 47	(United States) White Sands LC-33		(United States) GE / US Army	
14 June; 22:35	(United States) Blossom IVB	AMC	Suborbital	Cosmic Radiation / Solar X-Ray / Aeronomy / Ionospheric / Biological	14 June	Successful
14 June; 22:35	Project Hermes launch, apogee: 134 kilometres (83 mi), carried Albert II, the first mammal and monkey in space. Albert II died on impact after his capsule's parachute failed.					
15 June; 02:03	(United States) Aerobee RTV-N-8	NRL 5	(United States) White Sands LC-35		(United States) US Navy	
15 June; 02:03		NRL	Suborbital	Ozone Spectroscopy / Solar X-Ray	15 June	Successful
15 June; 02:03	Apogee: 109 kilometres (68 mi)					
17 June; 11:50	(United States) Aerobee RTV-N-8	A13	(United States) White Sands LC-35		(United States) US Navy	
17 June; 11:50		APL	Suborbital	Aerodynamics test	17 June	Successful
17 June; 11:50	Apogee: 88 kilometres (55 mi)					
23 June; 23:21	(United States) Aerobee RTV-N-8	A14	(United States) White Sands LC-35		(United States) US Navy	
23 June; 23:21		APL / NRL	Suborbital	Cosmic Radiation / Solar X-Ray	23 June	Successful
23 June; 23:21	Apogee: 88 kilometres (55 mi)					
21 July; 16:01	(United States) Aerobee XASR-SC-1	SC 4	(United States) White Sands LC-35		(United States) US Army	
21 July; 16:01		USASC / University of Michigan / NRL	Suborbital	Solar X-Ray / Aeronomy	21 July	Successful
21 July; 16:01	Apogee: 76.1 kilometres (47.3 mi)					
6 September; 16:57	(United States) Viking (first model)		(United States) White Sands LC-33 – Army Launch Area 1		(United States) US Navy	
6 September; 16:57	(United States) Viking 2	NRL	Suborbital	Aeronomy / Imaging	6 September	Launch failure
6 September; 16:57	Apogee: 51 kilometres (32 mi)					
10 September	(Soviet Union) R-1		(Soviet Union) Kapustin Yar		(Soviet Union) NII-88 Section 3	
10 September		NII-88 Section 3	Suborbital	Missile test	10 September	Successful
10 September	First flight of second series of tests					
11 September	(Soviet Union) R-1		(Soviet Union) Kapustin Yar		(Soviet Union) NII-88 Section 3	
11 September		NII-88 Section 3	Suborbital	Missile test	11 September	Successful
13 September	(Soviet Union) R-1		(Soviet Union) Kapustin Yar		(Soviet Union) NII-88 Section 3	
13 September		NII-88 Section 3	Suborbital	Missile test	13 September	Successful
14 September	(Soviet Union) R-1		(Soviet Union) Kapustin Yar		(Soviet Union) NII-88 Section 3	
14 September		NII-88 Section 3	Suborbital	Missile test	14 September	Successful
16 September; 23:19	(Nazi Germany) V-2	V-2 No. 32	(United States) White Sands LC-33		(United States) GE / US Army	
16 September; 23:19	(United States) Blossom IVC	AMC	Suborbital	Aeronomy / Ionospheric / Cosmic Radiation / Solar X-Ray / Biological	16 September	Launch failure
16 September; 23:19	Apogee: 4.2 kilometres (2.6 mi), carried Albert III. Rocket tumbled after two explosions in the tail section at 10.7 and 24.2 seconds.					
17 September	(Soviet Union) R-1		(Soviet Union) Kapustin Yar		(Soviet Union) NII-88 Section 3	
17 September		NII-88 Section 3	Suborbital	Missile test	17 September	Successful
19 September	(Soviet Union) R-1		(Soviet Union) Kapustin Yar		(Soviet Union) NII-88 Section 3	
19 September		NII-88 Section 3	Suborbital	Missile test	19 September	Successful
20 September	(Soviet Union) R-1		(Soviet Union) Kapustin Yar		(Soviet Union) NII-88 Section 3	
20 September		NII-88 Section 3	Suborbital	Missile test	20 September	Launch failure
20 September; 17:03	(United States) Aerobee XASR-SC-1	SC 5	(United States) White Sands LC-35		(United States) US Army	
20 September; 17:03		USASC / University of Michigan / NRL	Suborbital	Aeronomy / Solar X-Ray	20 September	Successful
20 September; 17:03	Apogee: 58.6 kilometres (36.4 mi)					
23 September	(Soviet Union) R-1		(Soviet Union) Kapustin Yar		(Soviet Union) NII-88 Section 3	
23 September		NII-88 Section 3	Suborbital	Missile test	23 September	Launch failure
25 September; 11:16	(Soviet Union) R-2E		(Soviet Union) Kapustin Yar		(Soviet Union) NII-88 Section 3	
25 September; 11:16		NII-88 Section 3	Suborbital	Missile test	25 September	Successful
25 September; 11:16	Maiden flight of R-2E, a modified R-1 missile to test R-2 concepts: integral fuel tank and separable warhead					
28 September	(Soviet Union) R-1		(Soviet Union) Kapustin Yar		(Soviet Union) NII-88 Section 3	
28 September		NII-88 Section 3	Suborbital	Missile test	28 September	Successful
29 September; 16:58	(Nazi Germany) V-2	V-2 No. 49	(United States) White Sands LC-33		(United States) GE / US Army	
29 September; 16:58		NRL	Suborbital	Aeronomy / Cosmic Radiation / Ionospheric / Meteoric Dust Collectors	29 September	Successful
29 September; 16:58	Project Hermes launch, apogee: 151 kilometres (94 mi)					
30 September; 11:49	(Soviet Union) R-2E		(Soviet Union) Kapustin Yar		(Soviet Union) NII-88 Section 3	
30 September; 11:49		NII-88 Section 3	Suborbital	Missile test	30 September	Successful
2 October; 11:00	(Soviet Union) R-2E		(Soviet Union) Kapustin Yar		(Soviet Union) NII-88 Section 3	
2 October; 11:00		NII-88 Section 3	Suborbital	Missile test	2 October	Partial failure
2 October; 11:00	Fire in tail compartment					
3 October	(Soviet Union) R-1		(Soviet Union) Kapustin Yar		(Soviet Union) NII-88 Section 3	
3 October		NII-88 Section 3	Suborbital	Missile test	3 October	Successful
6 October	(Nazi Germany) V-2		(United States) White Sands LC-33		(United States) US Army	
6 October	(United States) Hermes II	US Army	Suborbital	Missile test	6 October	Launch failure
6 October	Project Hermes launch, apogee: 4 kilometres (2.5 mi)					
8 October; 06:05	(Soviet Union) R-2E		(Soviet Union) Kapustin Yar		(Soviet Union) NII-88 Section 3	
8 October; 06:05		NII-88 Section 3	Suborbital	Missile test	8 October	Successful
8 October	(Soviet Union) R-1		(Soviet Union) Kapustin Yar		(Soviet Union) NII-88 Section 3	
8 October		NII-88 Section 3	Suborbital	Missile test	8 October	Successful
10 October	(Soviet Union) R-1		(Soviet Union) Kapustin Yar		(Soviet Union) NII-88 Section 3	
10 October		NII-88 Section 3	Suborbital	Missile test	10 October	Successful
11 October; 12:45	(Soviet Union) R-2E		(Soviet Union) Kapustin Yar		(Soviet Union) NII-88 Section 3	
11 October; 12:45		NII-88 Section 3	Suborbital	Missile test	11 October	Partial failure
11 October; 12:45	Fire in tail compartment, last of five R-2E launches					
12 October	(Soviet Union) R-1		(Soviet Union) Kapustin Yar		(Soviet Union) NII-88 Section 3	
12 October		NII-88 Section 3	Suborbital	Missile test	12 October	Successful
13 October	(Soviet Union) R-1		(Soviet Union) Kapustin Yar		(Soviet Union) NII-88 Section 3	
13 October		NII-88 Section 3	Suborbital	Missile test	13 October	Successful
13 October	(Soviet Union) R-1		(Soviet Union) Kapustin Yar		(Soviet Union) NII-88 Section 3	
13 October		NII-88 Section 3	Suborbital	Missile test	13 October	Successful
15 October	(Soviet Union) R-1		(Soviet Union) Kapustin Yar		(Soviet Union) NII-88 Section 3	
15 October		NII-88 Section 3	Suborbital	Missile test	15 October	Successful
18 October	(Soviet Union) R-1		(Soviet Union) Kapustin Yar		(Soviet Union) NII-88 Section 3	
18 October		NII-88 Section 3	Suborbital	Missile test	18 October	Successful
19 October	(Soviet Union) R-1		(Soviet Union) Kapustin Yar		(Soviet Union) NII-88 Section 3	
19 October		NII-88 Section 3	Suborbital	Missile test	19 October	Successful
22 October	(Soviet Union) R-1		(Soviet Union) Kapustin Yar		(Soviet Union) NII-88 Section 3	
22 October		NII-88 Section 3	Suborbital	Missile test	22 October	Successful
23 October	(Soviet Union) R-1		(Soviet Union) Kapustin Yar		(Soviet Union) NII-88 Section 3	
23 October		NII-88 Section 3	Suborbital	Missile test	23 October	Successful
23 October	Last of second series of twenty firings					
18 November; 16:03	(Nazi Germany) V-2	V-2 No. 56	(United States) White Sands LC-33		(United States) GE / US Army	
18 November; 16:03	(United States) Grenades	USASC	Suborbital	Aeronomy / Cosmic Radiation	18 November	Successful
18 November; 16:03	Project Hermes launch, apogee: 124 kilometres (77 mi)					
2 December; 22:20	(United States) Aerobee RTV-A-1	USAF 1	(United States) Holloman LC-A		(United States) US Air Force	
2 December; 22:20		AFCRL / Boston University / WADC	Suborbital	Solar X-Ray / Aeronomy / Imaging	2 December	Successful
2 December; 22:20	Apogee: 96.1 kilometres (59.7 mi), maiden flight of the RTV-A-1					
6 December; 18:32	(United States) Aerobee XASR-SC-1	SC 3	(United States) White Sands LC-35		(United States) US Army	
6 December; 18:32		USASC / University of Michigan	Suborbital	Aeronomy	6 December	Successful
6 December; 18:32	Apogee: 64.9 kilometres (40.3 mi)					
7 December; 00:16	(United States) Aerobee XASR-SC-1	SC 7	(United States) White Sands LC-35		(United States) US Army	
7 December; 00:16		USASC / University of Michigan	Suborbital	Aeronomy	7 December	Successful
7 December; 00:16	Apogee: 60.0 kilometres (37.3 mi)					
8 December; 19:15	(Nazi Germany) V-2	V-2 No. 31	(United States) White Sands LC-33		(United States) GE / US Army	
8 December; 19:15	(United States) Blossom IVD	AMC	Suborbital	Aeronomy / Ionospheric / Solar X-Ray / Biological	8 December	Successful
8 December; 19:15	Apogee: 127 kilometres (79 mi), carried Albert IV					
15 December; 17:10	(United States) Aerobee RTV-A-1	USAF 2	(United States) Holloman LC-A		(United States) US Air Force	
15 December; 17:10		AFCRL / University of Michigan	Suborbital	Solar X-Ray / Aeronomy	15 December	Launch failure
15 December; 17:10	Apogee: 0.3 kilometres (0.19 mi), exploded shortly after leaving tower					

=== 1950 ===
1950 launches
Date and time (UTC)	Rocket	Flight number	Launch site		LSP	
Date and time (UTC)	Payload	Operator	Orbit	Function	Decay (UTC)	Outcome
Date and time (UTC)	Remarks					
15 January; 23:45	(United States) Aerobee RTV-N-10	A15	(United States) USS Norton Sound, Gulf of Alaska		(United States) US Navy	
15 January; 23:45		APL	Suborbital	Cosmic Radiation	15 January	Successful
15 January; 23:45	Ship-launched; Apogee: 72 kilometres (45 mi), maiden flight of the RTV-N-10					
18 January; 23:17	(United States) Aerobee RTV-N-10	A16	(United States) USS Norton Sound, Pacific Ocean near the state of Washington		(United States) US Navy	
18 January; 23:17		APL	Suborbital	Cosmic Radiation	18 January	Successful
18 January; 23:17	Ship-launched; Apogee: 80 kilometres (50 mi)					
9 February; 21:44	(United States) Viking (first model)		(United States) White Sands LC-33 – Army Launch Area 1		(United States) US Navy	
9 February; 21:44	(United States) Viking 3	NRL	Suborbital	Cosmic Radiation / Solar Radiation / Aeronomy / Imaging	9 February	Launch failure
9 February; 21:44	Veered off-course, failed to reach space, apogee: 80 kilometres (50 mi)					
14 February; 23:14	(United States) Aerobee RTV-N-8	NRL 4	(United States) White Sands LC-35		(United States) US Navy	
14 February; 23:14		NRL	Suborbital	Cosmic Radiation / Aeronomy	14 February	Successful
14 February; 23:14	Apogee: 87.5 kilometres (54.4 mi), final flight of the RTV-N-8					
17 February; 18:00	(Nazi Germany) V-2	V-2 No. 53	(United States) White Sands LC-33		(United States) GE / US Army	
17 February; 18:00		NRL	Suborbital	Solar X-Ray / Cosmic Radiation / Aeronomy	17 February	Successful
17 February; 18:00	Project Hermes launch, apogee: 148 kilometres (92 mi)					
22 February; 00:54:30	(United States) Aerobee XASR-SC-1	SC 9	(United States) White Sands LC-35		(United States) US Army	
22 February; 00:54:30		USASC / University of Michigan / NRL	Suborbital	Solar X-Ray / Aeronomy	22 February	Successful
22 February; 00:54:30	Apogee: 49.1 kilometres (30.5 mi)					
4 March; 00:36	(United States) Aerobee XASR-SC-1	SC 6	(United States) White Sands LC-35		(United States) US Army	
4 March; 00:36	(United States) Grenades	USASC	Suborbital	Aeronomy	4 March	Successful
4 March; 00:36	Apogee: 72 kilometres (45 mi)					
14 March; 20:43	(United States) Aerobee RTV-A-1	USAF 3	(United States) Holloman LC-A		(United States) US Air Force	
14 March; 20:43		AFCRL / University of Rhode Island	Suborbital	Solar Radiation / Sky Brightness	14 March	Launch failure
14 March; 20:43	Apogee: 3.2 kilometres (2.0 mi), premature fuel cutoff after 4.75 seconds.					
26 April; 01:11	(United States) Aerobee XASR-SC-2	SC 11	(United States) White Sands LC-35		(United States) US Army	
26 April; 01:11		USASC / University of Michigan	Suborbital	Aeronomy	26 April	Successful
26 April; 01:11	Apogee: 99.5 kilometres (61.8 mi), maiden flight of the XASR-SC-2					
12 May; 03:08	(United States) Viking (first model)		(United States) USS Norton Sound, Pacific Ocean, near Jarvis Island		(United States) US Navy	
12 May; 03:08	(United States) Viking 4	NRL	Suborbital	Ionospheric / Aeronomy	12 May	Successful
12 May; 03:08	Apogee: 169 kilometres (105 mi)					
12 May; 12:30	(United States) Aerobee RTV-N-10	A17	(United States) White Sands LC-35		(United States) US Navy	
12 May; 12:30		APL	Suborbital	Cosmic Radiation	12 May	Successful
12 May; 12:30	Apogee: 88.1 kilometres (54.7 mi)					
26 May; 19:43	(United States) Aerobee RTV-A-1	USAF 4	(United States) Holloman LC-A		(United States) US Air Force	
26 May; 19:43		AFCRL / University of Rhode Island	Suborbital	Solar Radiation	26 May	Successful
26 May; 19:43	Apogee: 67 kilometres (42 mi)					
2 June; 17:07	(United States) Aerobee RTV-A-1	USAF 5	(United States) Holloman LC-A		(United States) US Air Force	
2 June; 17:07		AFCRL	Suborbital	Sky Brightness	2 June	Partial launch failure
2 June; 17:07	Apogee: 24.8 kilometres (15.4 mi), nose cone broke off at 2.8 seconds and rocket continued flying without nose. Some telemetry received and instruments operated satisfactorally, but experiments returned no data due to short flight duration.					
20 June; 15:38	(United States) Aerobee RTV-A-1	USAF 6	(United States) Holloman LC-A		(United States) US Air Force	
20 June; 15:38		AFCRL / University of Michigan	Suborbital	Aeronomy	20 June	Successful
20 June; 15:38	Apogee: 92.5 kilometres (57.5 mi)					
14 July; 08:39	(United States) Aerobee XASR-SC-1	SC 8	(United States) White Sands LC-35		(United States) US Army	
14 July; 08:39	(United States) Grenades	USASC	Suborbital	Aeronomy	14 July	Successful
14 July; 08:39	Apogee: 69 kilometres (43 mi)					
24 July; 14:29	(Nazi Germany) (United States) Bumper		(United States) Cape Canaveral LC-3		(United States) GE / US Army	
24 July; 14:29	(United States) Bumper 8	GE	Suborbital	Low angle speed test	24 July	Launch failure
24 July; 14:29	First missile launch from Cape Canaveral; apogee: 20 kilometres (12 mi)					
29 July; 11:25	(Nazi Germany) (United States) Bumper		(United States) Cape Canaveral LC-3		(United States) GE / US Army	
29 July; 11:25	(United States) Bumper 7	GE	Suborbital	Low angle speed test	29 July	Successful
29 July; 11:25	Apogee: 35.2 kilometres (21.9 mi)					
3 August; 23:52	(United States) Aerobee RTV-N-10	NRL 6	(United States) White Sands LC-35		(United States) US Navy	
3 August; 23:52		NRL	Suborbital	Sunfollower Spectroscopy / Solar X-Ray	3 August	Launch failure
3 August; 23:52	Apogee: 5.6 kilometres (3.5 mi), fuel line rupture caused sustainer to produce no useful thrust					
17 August; 15:45	(United States) Aerobee RTV-N-10	A18	(United States) White Sands LC-35		(United States) US Navy	
17 August; 15:45		APL	Suborbital	Aeronomy	17 August	Successful
17 August; 15:45	Apogee: 101 kilometres (63 mi)					
31 August; 17:09	(Nazi Germany) V-2	V-2 No. 51	(United States) White Sands LC-33		(United States) GE / US Army	
31 August; 17:09	(United States) Blossom IVG	AMC	Suborbital	Solar X-Ray / Aeronomy / Ionospheric / Sky Brightness / Biological	31 August	Successful
31 August; 17:09	Project Hermes launch, apogee: 137 kilometres (85 mi), carried a mouse which did not survive due to a parachute failure					
1 October	(Soviet Union) R-2		(Soviet Union) Kapustin Yar		(Soviet Union) OKB-1	
1 October		OKB-1	Suborbital	Missile test	1 October	Partial failure
1 October	Maiden flight of the R-2 prototype missile; missed target					
1 October	(Soviet Union) R-2		(Soviet Union) Kapustin Yar		(Soviet Union) OKB-1	
1 October		OKB-1	Suborbital	Missile test	1 October	Partial failure
1 October	Missed target					
12 October; 19:36	(United States) Aerobee RTV-A-1	USAF 7	(United States) Holloman LC-A		(United States) US Air Force	
12 October; 19:36		AFCRL / WADC / Boston University	Suborbital	Photography / Temperature	12 October	Successful
12 October; 19:36	Apogee: 91.2 kilometres (56.7 mi)					
17 October; 04:00	(United States) Aerobee XASR-SC-2	SC 10	(United States) White Sands LC-35		(United States) US Army	
17 October; 04:00	(United States) Grenades	USASC	Suborbital	Aeronomy	17 October	Successful
17 October; 04:00	Apogee: 80 kilometres (50 mi)					
18 October; 04:30	(United States) Aerobee XASR-SC-2	SC 12	(United States) White Sands LC-35		(United States) US Army	
18 October; 04:30	(United States) Grenades	USASC	Suborbital	Aeronomy	18 October	Successful
18 October; 04:30	Apogee: 85.6 kilometres (53.2 mi)					
21 October	(Soviet Union) R-2		(Soviet Union) Kapustin Yar		(Soviet Union) OKB-1	
21 October		OKB-1	Suborbital	Missile test	21 October	Partial Failure
21 October	Missed target					
26 October; 23:02	(Nazi Germany) V-2	V-2 No. 61	(United States) White Sands LC-33		(United States) GE / US Army	
26 October; 23:02		Ballistic Research Laboratory	Suborbital	Technology development	26 October	Partial failure
26 October; 23:02	Project Hermes launch: 8.1 kilometres (5.0 mi), rocket exploded at 50 seconds, but experiment still considered successful.					
27 October; 13:30	(United States) Aerobee XASR-SC-2	SC 13	(United States) White Sands LC-35		(United States) US Army	
27 October; 13:30		USASC / University of Michigan	Suborbital	Aeronomy	27 October	Successful
27 October; 13:30	Apogee: 80.1 kilometres (49.8 mi)					
1 November	(Soviet Union) R-2		(Soviet Union) Kapustin Yar		(Soviet Union) OKB-1	
1 November		OKB-1	Suborbital	Missile test	1 November	Partial failure
1 November	Missed target					
1 November	(Soviet Union) R-2		(Soviet Union) Kapustin Yar		(Soviet Union) OKB-1	
1 November		OKB-1	Suborbital	Missile test	1 November	Partial failure
1 November	Missed target					
1 November	(Soviet Union) R-2		(Soviet Union) Kapustin Yar		(Soviet Union) OKB-1	
1 November		OKB-1	Suborbital	Missile test	1 November	Partial failure
1 November	Missed target					
1 November	(Soviet Union) R-2		(Soviet Union) Kapustin Yar		(Soviet Union) OKB-1	
1 November		OKB-1	Suborbital	Missile test	1 November	Partial failure
1 November	Missed target					
1 November	(Soviet Union) R-2		(Soviet Union) Kapustin Yar		(Soviet Union) OKB-1	
1 November		OKB-1	Suborbital	Missile test	1 November	Partial failure
1 November	Missed target					
2 November; 16:29	(United States) Aerobee RTV-A-1	USAF 8	(United States) Holloman LC-A		(United States) US Air Force	
2 November; 16:29		AFCRL / University of Colorado / University of Denver	Suborbital	Airglow	2 November	Successful
2 November; 16:29	Apogee: 92 kilometres (57 mi)					
9 November	(Nazi Germany) V-2		(United States) White Sands LC-33		(United States) US Army	
9 November	(United States) Hermes II	US Army	Suborbital	Missile test	9 November	Partial Failure
9 November	Project Hermes launch, apogee: 150 kilometres (93 mi), final flight of the Hermes II					
21 November; 17:18	(United States) Viking (first model)		(United States) White Sands LC-33 – Army Launch Area 1		(United States) US Navy	
21 November; 17:18	(United States) Viking 5	NRL	Suborbital	Ionospheric / Solar Radiation / Aeronomy	21 November	Successful
21 November; 17:18	Apogee: 174 kilometres (108 mi)					
1 December	(Soviet Union) R-2		(Soviet Union) Kapustin Yar		(Soviet Union) OKB-1	
1 December		OKB-1	Suborbital	Missile test	1 December	Partial failure
1 December	Missed target					
1 December	(Soviet Union) R-2		(Soviet Union) Kapustin Yar		(Soviet Union) OKB-1	
1 December		OKB-1	Suborbital	Missile test	1 December	Partial failure
1 December	Missed target					
1 December	(Soviet Union) R-2		(Soviet Union) Kapustin Yar		(Soviet Union) OKB-1	
1 December		OKB-1	Suborbital	Missile test	1 December	Partial failure
1 December	Missed target					
11 December; 17:04	(United States) Aerobee XASR-SC-2	SC 15	(United States) White Sands LC-35		(United States) US Army	
11 December; 17:04		USASC / University of Michigan	Suborbital	Aeronomy	11 December	Launch failure
11 December; 17:04	Apogee: 0.3 kilometres (0.19 mi)					
12 December; 04:06	(United States) Aerobee XASR-SC-2	SC 14	(United States) White Sands LC-35		(United States) US Army	
12 December; 04:06	(United States) Grenades	USASC	Suborbital	Aeronomy	12 December	Successful
12 December; 04:06	Apogee: 83.8 kilometres (52.1 mi)					
12 December; 07:04	(United States) Viking (first model)		(United States) White Sands LC-33 – Army Launch Area 1		(United States) US Navy	
12 December; 07:04	(United States) Viking 6	NRL	Suborbital	Aeronomy / Solar Radiation / Ionospheric	12 December	Launch failure
12 December; 07:04	Apogee: 64 kilometres (40 mi)					
12 December; 09:10	(United States) Aerobee XASR-SC-2	SC 16	(United States) White Sands LC-35		(United States) US Army	
12 December; 09:10	(United States) Grenades	USASC	Suborbital	Aeronomy	12 December	Successful
12 December; 09:10	Apogee: 77.7 kilometres (48.3 mi)					
12 December; 18:26	(United States) Aerobee RTV-A-1	USAF 9	(United States) Holloman LC-A		(United States) US Air Force	
12 December; 18:26		AFCRL / University of Michigan	Suborbital	Aeronomy	12 December	Successful
12 December; 18:26	Apogee: 106 kilometres (66 mi)					
19 December; 18:52	(United States) Aerobee XASR-SC-2	SC 17	(United States) White Sands LC-35		(United States) US Army	
19 December; 18:52		USASC / University of Michigan	Suborbital	Aeronomy	19 December	Successful
19 December; 18:52	Apogee: 81.9 kilometres (50.9 mi)					
20 December	(Soviet Union) R-2		(Soviet Union) Kapustin Yar		(Soviet Union) OKB-1	
20 December		OKB-1	Suborbital	Missile test	20 December	Partial failure
20 December	Final flight of 12 mission prototype series; missed target					

- ← 1942
- 1943
- 1944
- 1945
- 1946
- 1947
- 1948
- 1949
- 1950 →

== Suborbital launch statistics (1945–1950) ==
=== By country ===
Launches by country
Country	Launches	Successes	Failures	Partial failures
Soviet Union	64	38	7	19
United Kingdom	3	2	0	1
United States	120	84	32	4
World	187	121	39	24

=== By rocket ===
- V-2 (British)
- V-2 (American)
- V-2 (Soviet)
- Bumper
- Viking (first model)
- Aerobee RTV-N-8
- Aerobee RTV-N-10
- Aerobee XASR-SC-1
- Aerobee XASR-SC-2
- Aerobee RTV-A-1
- R-1
- R-1A
- R-2E
- R-2

Launches by rocket
Rocket	Country	Launches	Successes	Failures	Partial failures	Remarks
V-2	United Kingdom	3	2	0	1	Maiden flight, retired
V-2 / Hermes II	United States	59	40	17	2	Maiden flight, first US spaceflight
Bumper	United States	8	3	5	0	Maiden flight, retired
Viking (first model)	United States	6	2	3	1	Maiden flight
Aerobee RTV-N-8	United States	16	13	3	0	Maiden flight, retired
Aerobee RTV-N-10	United States	5	4	1	0	Maiden flight
Aerobee XASR-SC-1	United States	9	9	0	0	Maiden flight
Aerobee XASR-SC-2	United States	8	7	1	0	Maiden flight
Aerobee RTV-A-1	United States	9	6	2	1	Maiden flight
V-2	Soviet Union	11	4	4	3	Maiden flight, retired
R-1	Soviet Union	30	27	3	0	Maiden flight, first Soviet spaceflight
R-1A	Soviet Union	6	4	0	2	Maiden flight, retired
R-2E	Soviet Union	5	3	0	2	Maiden flight, retired
R-2	Soviet Union	12	0	0	12	Maiden flight

== See also ==
- Timeline of spaceflight
- List of V-2 test launches
