= TsNIIMash-Export espionage trial =

The TsNIIMash-Export espionage trial concerned five Russian scientists accused of selling Russian military technology to Chinese spies. The scientists, Igor Reshetin, Sergei Vizir, Mikhail Ivanov, Sergei Tverdokhlebov, and Alexander Rozhkin, all worked for the Russian rocket and space researcher TsNIIMash-Export. Human rights groups have criticized Russia's handling of the case, and some have called the scientists political prisoners.

== Charges ==
The scientists were arrested on October 25, 2005, on charges of embezzlement and the sale of state secrets to the All-China Precision Engineering Import-Export Co. in 1996. All three were executives of the TsNIIMash-Export company, a state-owned rocket manufacturer and research company operating in Korolyov. The state claimed that the group had sold 13 laboratory reports related to space rocketry, to the Chinese company, and that the technology served a dual use which could undermine the secrecy of Russian weapon systems and, potentially, to build nuclear missiles. Alongside these charges were claims that the group had embezzled nearly a million US dollars through non-existent shell companies.

The defendants argued that the state had no expert able to testify to the dual use of the technology, nor did it provide evidence that the sale of the information had taken place. The technology had been sent to review by appropriate ministries, which found no concern, and approved the transfer in 2002, a year before the FSB opened its investigation. All major science institutions, and the Russian Space Agency, submitted opinions that the technology in question was not secret; 62 publicly available academic monographs containing the information alleged to be secret were submitted as evidence during the trial. Finally, the defense stated that the shadow corporations were legitimate subcontractors required to complete the manufacturing work called for in the contract.

== Defendants and sentencing ==
Igor Reshetin, director of TsNIIMash-Export, had been sentenced to 11 1/2 years. He was released on parole in 2012. He published several academic papers while in prison.

Sergei Vizir was chief economist of TsNIIMash-Export at the time of his arrest. He was sentenced to 11 years in prison.

Alexander Rozhkin was sentenced to five years.

Sergei Tverdokhlebov was executive director of the firm. He was released after signing a confession and died of a heart attack soon after his release at age 47.

Mikhail Ivanov, cofounder and deputy chair of TsNIIMash-Export, was charged separately after affirming that the information sold in the contract was not top secret. He was sentenced to five years.

== Response ==
Twenty academics, in an open letter to Prime Minister Medvedev in 2009, argued for dismissal of the charges against Reshetin, calling his arrest part of a "witch hunt" against Russian academics. Yury Ryzhov, chair of the Public Committee for the Defence of Scientists, also lobbied on behalf of Reshten's release.

The APS Committee on International Freedom of Scientists lobbied on behalf of Reshten, saying that "the charges against him appeared related to what would be considered routine scientific cooperation between research institutes in two countries".

== 2018 espionage arrests ==
On 21 July 2018, FSB raided offices of TsNIIMash and Roscosmos Research and Analytical Center and arrested ten employees suspected of passing classified hypersonic Russian missile technologies to Western intelligence agencies. Arrested are accused of high treason.

A senior researcher Sergey Meshcheryakov suspected of treason was put under house arrest in July 2019.
