= Kompozit =

Russian materials science company

AO "Кompozit" (Joint Stock Company "Kompozit") (Russian: АО «Композит»), previously ОAO "Кompozit" (Open Joint Stock Company "Kompozit") (Russian: ОАО «Композит»), is a Russian company in the field of materials science, famous for its role in several spacecraft and rocket projects. It is based in Korolyov, Moscow Oblast.

== Overview ==
AO "Kompozit" carries out research, experimentation, development and production of materials for advanced and general applications. Its products include aluminum, beryllium, titanium, nickel alloys; intermetallics, constructional steels, carbon-carbon and ceramic-matrix composites, metal-matrix composites reinforced with boric and carbon fibers, constructional glass, organic and carbon fibers plastics, coverings, glues, compounds and enamels.

The company has been involved in several spacecraft programs, such as Salyut, Soyuz, Proton, Mir, Energiya‑Buran, Sojuz‑Apollon, Vega, Fobos and the International Space Station. It has also delivered some elements of the beryllium ion guide of CERN's Large Hadron Collider in Switzerland.

== History ==
Kompozit's history dates back to 1947, when it was founded as the material science department of plant No 88. It later became a branch of the material science research institute-88. In 1975 the separate organization Central material science research institute under the General Engineering Ministry of the USSR was created. In 1987 it was reorganized into the scientific production association Kompozit (since July 1993 it has been a public corporation).
