= International Space Olympics =

The International Space Olympics (ISO) is an annual two-week competition for teenagers aged from 14 to 18, held in Korolyov, Russia. The competition includes examinations in Mathematics, Physics, Computer Science, and English Literature, in addition to presentation of a space related research project.

On days when participants are not competing, they are given tours of some of Russia's top space facilities and areas of cultural significance, and even have a chance to videochat with astronauts and cosmonauts on the ISS. Participants come from a wide range of countries, with each country represented as a team. In previous years, teams have attended from Germany, Greece, Israel, United Kingdom, the United States, Kazakhstan, Australia, Spain and Russia. Overall, in 2012 there were 130 participating students, in 2013 and 2014 - over 200. Over the years, the International Space Olympics has been attended by over 1,850 Russian students, as well as more than 800 students from other countries.

The Olympics are held on the initiative of S. P. Korolyov Energia Space and Rocket Corporation and has an international status. The Opening Ceremony is usually started by the heads of Korolyov City, the Moscow region, municipal heads of education, pilots, cosmonauts and representatives from RSC Energia and MCC (mission control center in Korolyov).

== Links ==
- High Tech Seminars in Korolev
