= RKA Mission Control Center =

Facility set up by Roscosmos in Moscow

Coordinates: 55.912938°N 37.809743°E

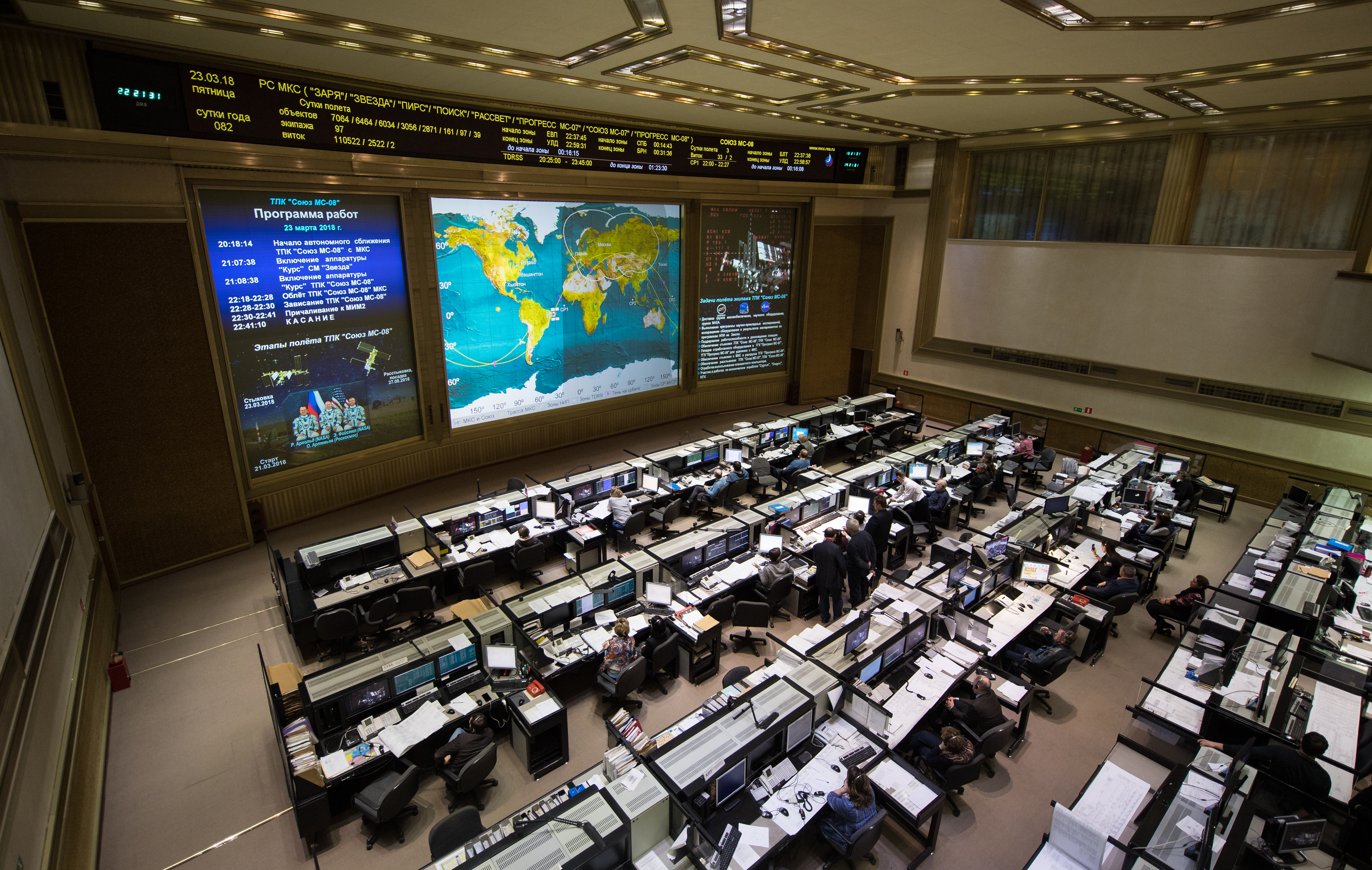
The main ISS mission control room.

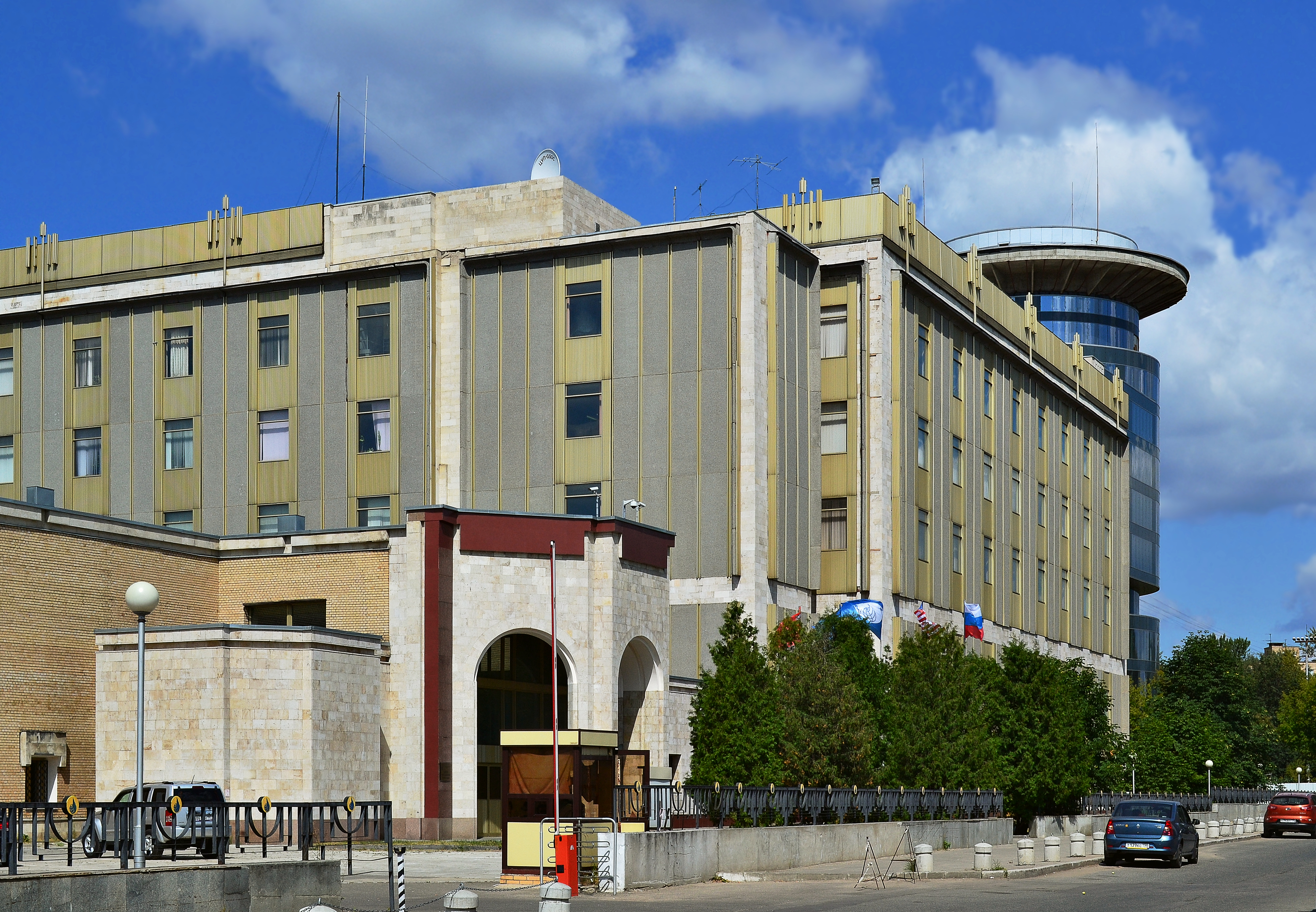
A building of the RKA Mission Control Center in Korolyov.

The RKA Mission Control Center (Note: RKA (Russian: РКА): Russian space agency (Russian: Российское космическое агентство, Rossiyskoye kosmicheskoye agentstvo).) (Russian: Центр управления полётами, romanized: Tsentr upravlyeniya polyotami), also known by its acronym TsUP (ЦУП) or by its radio callsign Mission Control Moscow, is the mission control center of Roscosmos. It is located in Korolyov, Moscow Oblast, on Pionerskaya Street near the S.P. Korolev Rocket and Space Corporation Energia plant.

It contains an active control room for the International Space Station. It also houses a memorial control room for the Mir space station where the last few orbits of Mir before it burned up in the atmosphere are shown on the display screens.

TsUP provides practical flight control for spacecraft of several different classes: crewed orbital complexes, spaceships, space probes and civilian, and scientific satellites. At the same time, it carries out scientific and engineering research and development of methods, algorithms, and tools for control problems, ballistics, and navigation.
