= TsNIIMash =

Subsidiary of Roscosmos

- Type: Federal state unitary enterprise
- Industry: Defense industry Space industry Aerospace industry
- Founded: 1946
- Headquarters: Korolyov, Russia
- Products: Full-range research and design of rocket and space technology (RST).
- Revenue: $206 million (2014)
- Parent: Roscosmos
- Website: tsniimash.ru

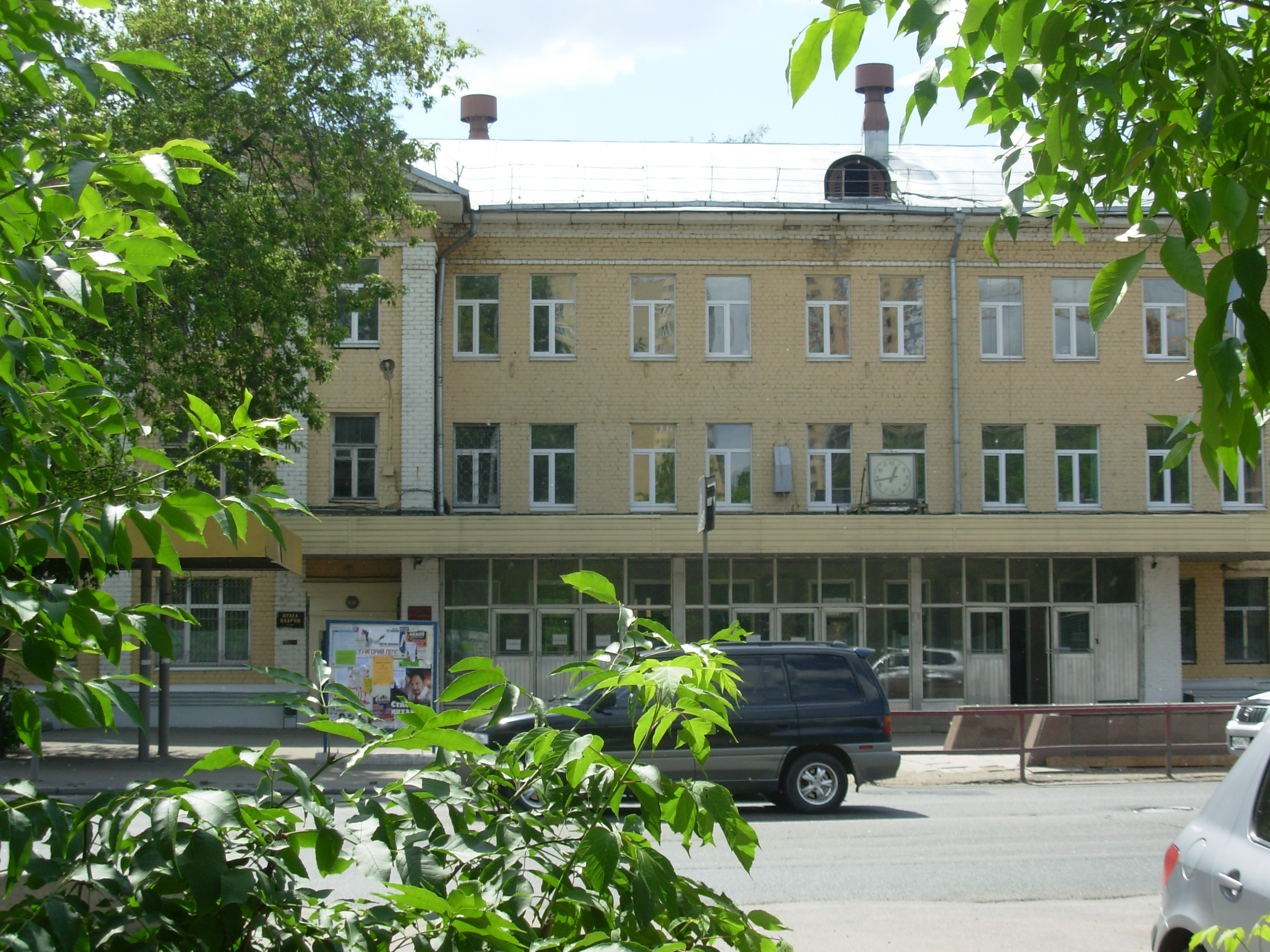
Checkpoint NII-88 (TsNIIMash) on Pioneer Street, in 2011

TsNIIMash (Russian: ЦНИИмаш) is a Russian rocket and spacecraft scientific center, dealing with all phases of development from conceptual design to flight tests. The Institute is the main analytical center of Roskosmos in the field of system-wide studies of the problems of the development of Russia's RKT with a wide range of tasks: from conceptual design and long-term prospects for the development of rocket and space technology to specific technological developments and their conversion in the interests of other industries. It was established in 1946.

The name TsNIIMash is an initialism for Central Research Institute of Machine Building (Russian: Центральный научно-исследовательский институт машиностроения).

== History ==
Originally called NII-88 (Scientific-Research Institute No.88), the entity was established on May 13, 1946, located at what was then called Kaliningrad, Moscow Oblast (now Korolyov), northeast of Moscow. It was based on Plant No. 88 (full name: M.I. Kalinin Plant No. 88, producing artillery and tanks during WW2) and headed by Dmitriy Ustinov who had successfully lobbied to control post-war research and development of rockets in late 1945.

Impressed by his work in Germany on the analysis of the V-2, Ustinov appointed Sergey Korolev chief designer of section 3 on long-range missiles, later called OKB-1. In 1956, OKB-1 was removed from NII-88 to become an independent bureau.

Helmut Gröttrup headed a group of German scientists working for the Soviets at Branch 1 of NII-88 located on Gorodomlya Island. Their job was to help reconstruct a Russian Version of the V-2, called the R-1, after which they were returned to Germany. The facility was also spied on by American U-2 spy planes in the late 1950s.

Other notable personnel included Kurt Magnus.

It was renamed Central Research Institute of Machine Building in 1967.

== Activities ==
TsNIIMash performs the following activities:

- Fundamental scientific and system research to prepare the basic strategy for spacecraft and rocket technology development.
- Theoretical calculations and experimental research on aeronautical and gas dynamic loads in the atmosphere of the Earth and other planets, and in outer space.
- Analysis of the thermal resistance of thermal shields in high-temperature gas flows.
- Theoretical calculations and experimental qualification of designs under the influence of static, dynamic, shock, and thermal loads.
- Ground control of spacecraft, as well as research and development of new methods and algorithms for guidance, ballistics and navigation.
- Development of methods and instruments for mission control during orbital insertion, attitude re-orientation, stabilization, orbital maneuvering, re-entry and landing.
- Reliability aspects of spacecraft and rocket engineering.
- Standardization and harmonization of spacecraft and rocket engineering products, as well as certification and quality control.
- Introduction of space technology in the national economy.

== Directors ==
- 1946 – Alexander D.Kallistratov
- 1946–1950 – Leo R.Honor
- 1950–1952 – Konstantin Rudnev
- 1952–1953 – Mikhail Kuzmich Yangel
- 1953–1959 – Alex S. Spiridonov
- 1959–1961 – Georgy Tyulin
- 1961–1990 – Yuri Alexandrovich Mozzhorin
- 1990–2000 – Vladimir Fedorovich Utkin
- 2000–2008 – Nicholas Apollonovich Anfimov
- 2008–2013 – Gennady G.Raikunov
- 2013–2014 – Nikolai G. Panichkin
- 2014–2015 – Alexander G.Milkovskii
- 2015–2018 – Oleg Anatolyevich Gorshkov
- 2018–2019 – Nikolay Nikolaevich Sevastyanov
- From 2019 – Sergey Vladimirovich Koblov

== 2018 espionage arrests ==
On 21 July 2018, FSB raided offices of TsNIIMash and Roscosmos Research and Analytical Center and arrested ten employees suspected of passing classified hypersonic Russian missile technologies to Western intelligence agencies. The arrested are accused of high treason.

A senior researcher Sergey Meshcheryakov suspected of treason was put under house arrest in July 2019.

== 2022 fire ==
On 22 April 2022 buildings at the site were damaged by a large fire.

== See also ==
- TsNIIMash-Export espionage trial

== Literature ==
- "Space science city Korolev" – author: Posamentir R. D. M; publisher: SP Struchenevsky O. V. ISBN 978-5-905234-12-5.
- "I look back and have no regrets" – author: Abramov, Anatoly Petrovich; publisher: "New format", Barnaul, 2022. ISBN 978-5-00202-034-8.
