= Korolyov, Moscow Oblast =

City in Moscow Oblast, Russia

Korolyov Королёв
- City
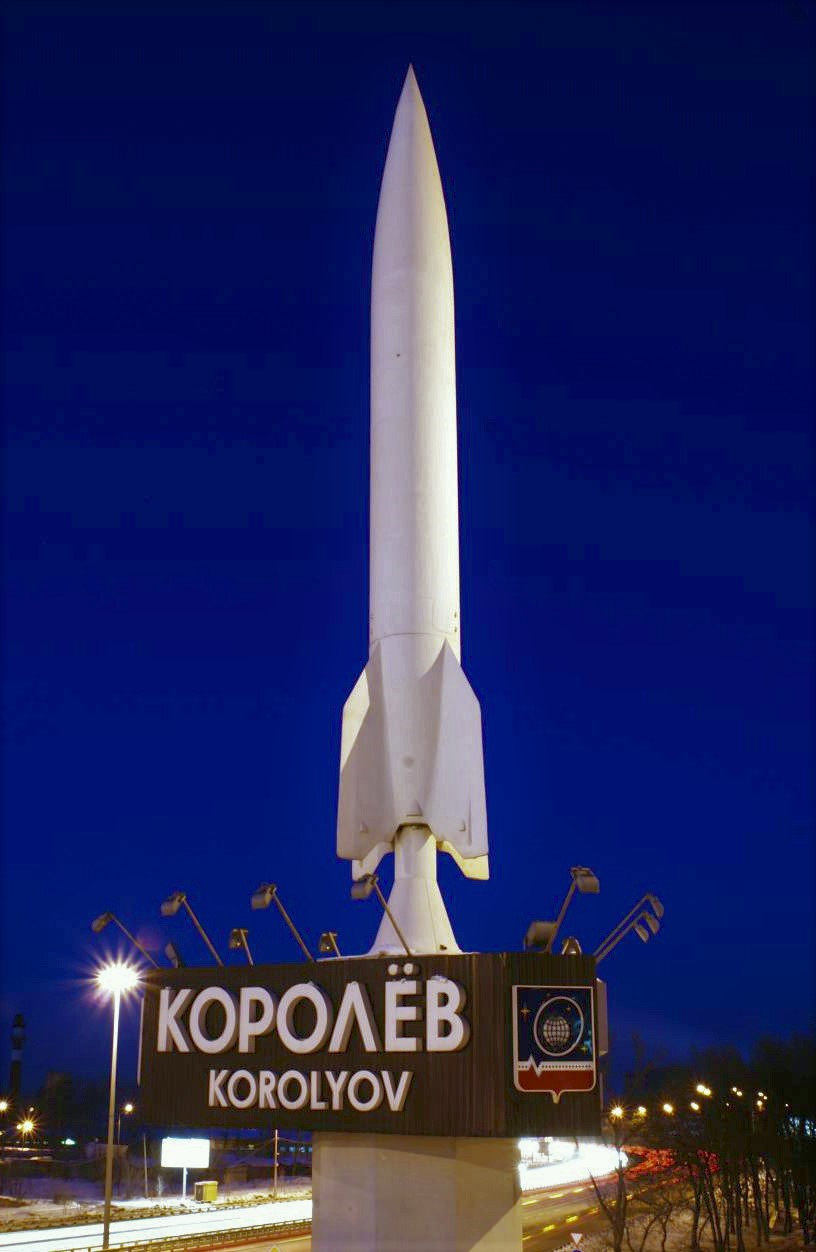
- Monument R-2 (It was established in 1997) at the entrance to the city from the M8 Highway

- Flag Coat of arms
- Interactive map of Korolyov
- Location of Korolyov Korolyov (Moscow Oblast)
- Coordinates: 55°55′N 37°49′E
- Country: Russia
- Federal subject: Moscow Oblast
- Founded: 26 December 1938
- City status since: 1938

Government
  - Head: Trifonov, Igor Vladimirovich
- Elevation: 160 m (520 ft)

Population (2010 Census)
  - Total: 183,402
  - Estimate (2025): 226,477 (+23.5%)
  - Rank: 98th in 2010

Administrative status
  - Subordinated to: Korolyov City Under Oblast Jurisdiction
  - Capital of: Korolyov City Under Oblast Jurisdiction

Municipal status
  - Urban okrug: Korolyov Urban Okrug
  - Capital of: Korolyov Urban Okrug
- Time zone: UTC+3 (MSK)
- Postal codes: 141060, 141062, 141065, 141067–141071, 141073–141080, 141089, 994009
- OKTMO ID: 46734000001
- Website: korolev.ru

Korolyov or Korolev (Russian: Королёв, IPA: [kərɐˈlʲɵf]) is an industrial city in Moscow Oblast, Russia, well known as the cradle of Soviet and Russian space exploration. As of the 2010 Census, its population was 183,402, the largest as a science city. As of 2018, the population was more than 222,000 people.

It was known as Kaliningrad (Калинингра́д) from 1938 to 1996 and served as the leading Soviet center for production of anti-tank and air-defense guns. In 1946, in the aftermath of World War II, the artillery plant was reconstructed for production of rockets, launch vehicles, and spacecraft, under the guidance of Soviet scientist and academician Sergei Korolev, who envisioned, consolidated and guided the activities of many people in the Soviet space-exploration program. The plant later became known as the RKK Energia; when the Vostok space vehicle was being developed, this research center was designated as NII-88 or POB 989.

Russian Mission Control Center is also located in Korolyov. Though the real control is decentralized due to security reasons and all space aircraft may be controlled from many different locations across Russia, the historic center of control is still in Korolyov, and is called FCC – Flights Control Center.

In July 1996, the city was renamed in commemoration of Sergei Korolev, the father of the Soviet/Russian space program, who died in 1966. Since 1997, Korolyov has hosted the International Space Olympics, an annual competition for young people to promote space related research.

== History ==
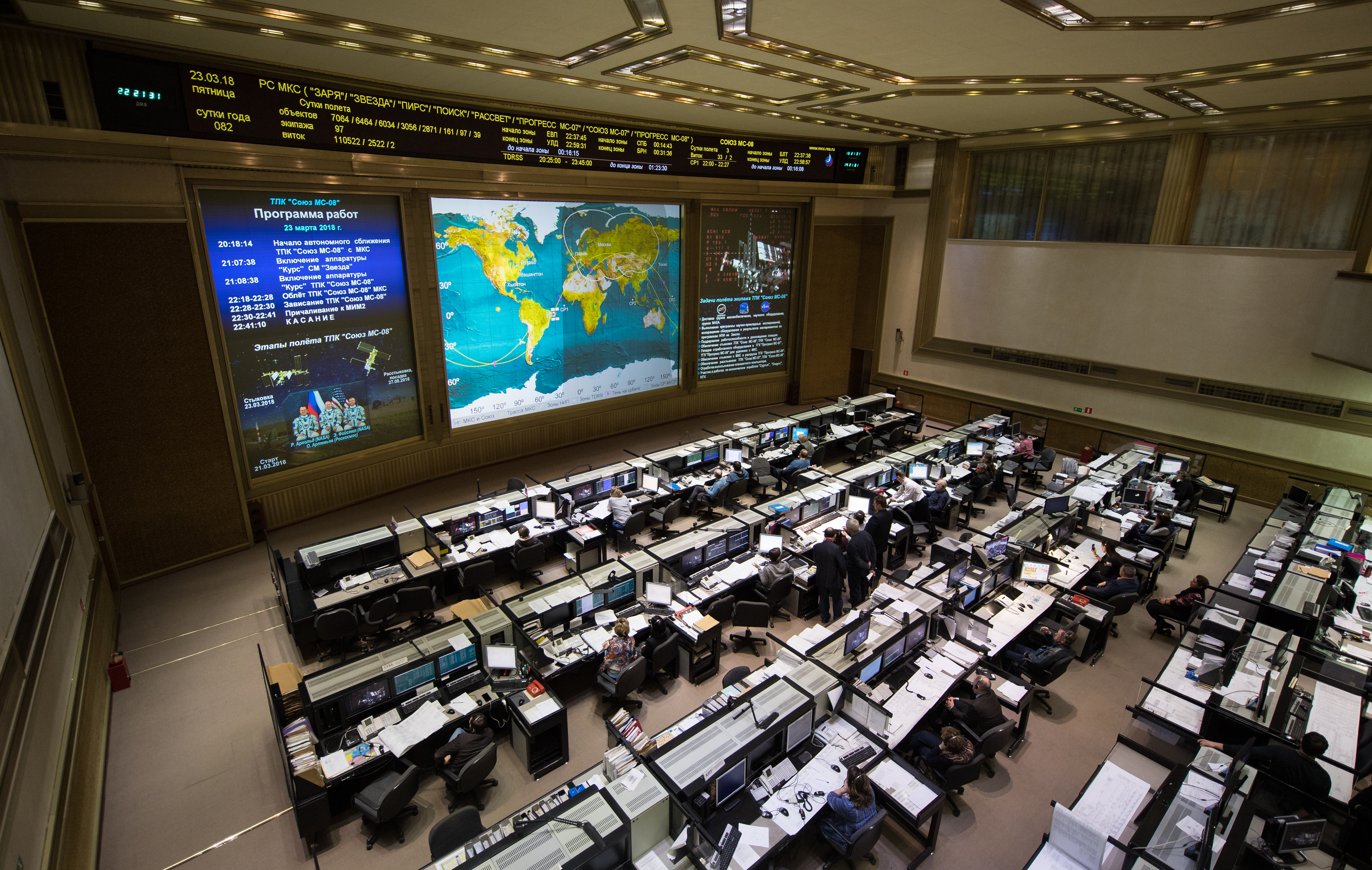
The Mission control center "ЦУП" ("TsUP") of the Russian Federal Space Agency

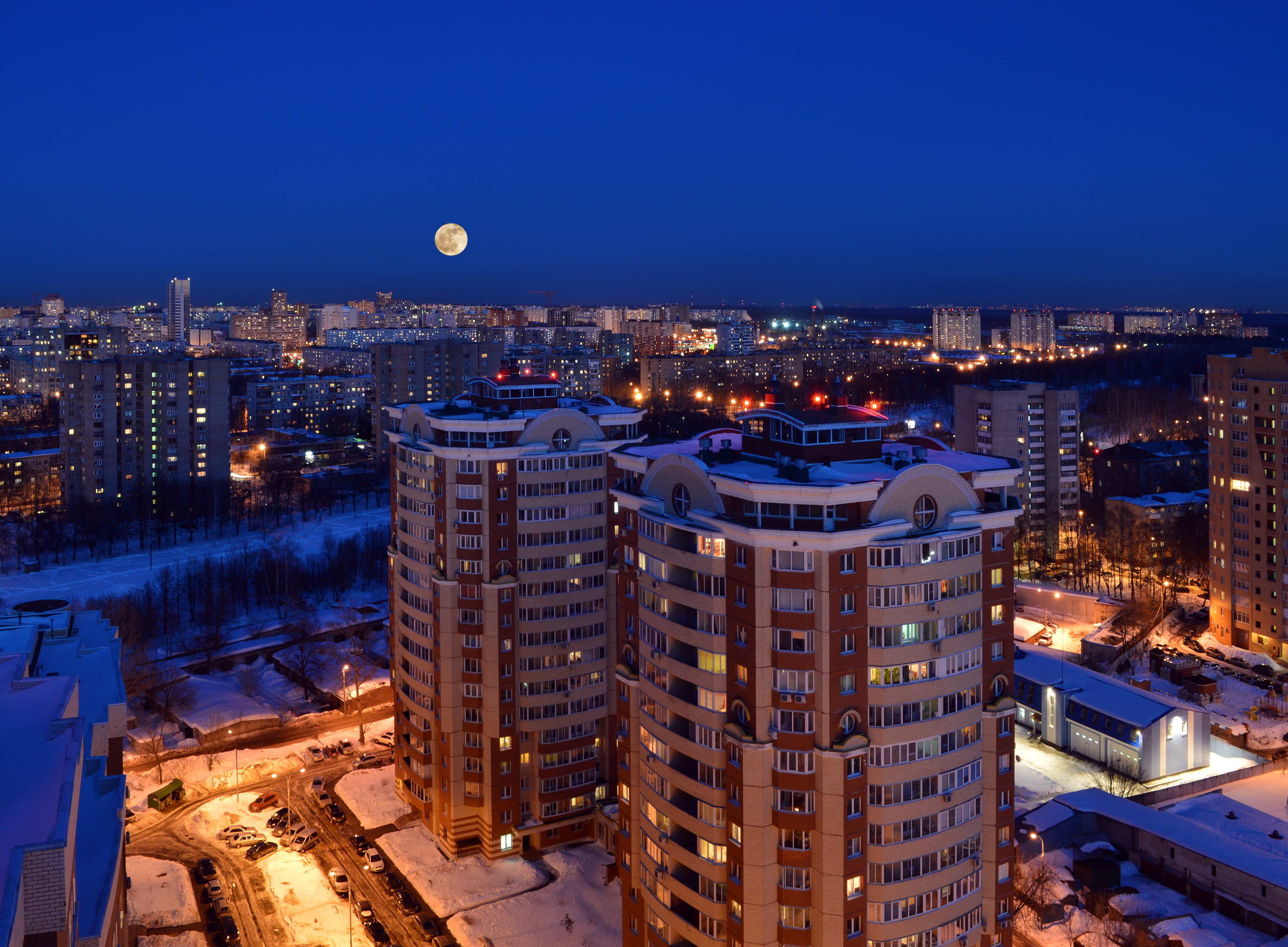
Springtime evening panorama towards the central part of the city

In the 12th century, a Slavic settlement was located on the site of modern Korolyov. The settlement stood on a junction of trade routes between the Moscow and Vladimir-Suzdal principalities. After the Mongol conquests in the 13th century, the region was in decline.

The village of Podlipki had formed on the site by the 18th century, when one of the first textile factories in Russia was established there.

From the late 19 century, Podlipki was also known as a dacha village frequented by many literali, as can be witnessed by the name of Podlipki-Dachnye railway station. They later moved their dachas to Peredelkino in Moscow's southwestern suburb, when Podlipki became a closed city of the Russian SFSR.

In 1924, the first OGPU working commune in the Soviet Union was established at Podlipki. In 1938, the Kalininsky settlement near an artillery plant (which had previously been relocated from Leningrad to better protect it in case of any future war) was granted town status and named Kaliningrad (meaning Kalinin City, after Bolshevik leader Mikhail Kalinin; not to be confused with the Baltic port city also renamed Kaliningrad after Mikhail Kalinin in 1946). Over the next three decades the town expanded greatly as a home of rocket manufacturing for both military missiles and the Soviet space program. As such it was a closed city to foreigners, who could not travel there.

== Administrative and municipal status ==
Within the framework of administrative divisions, it is incorporated as Korolyov City Under Oblast Jurisdiction—an administrative unit with the status equal to that of the districts. As a municipal division, Korolyov City Under Oblast Jurisdiction is incorporated as Korolyov Urban Okrug.

In June 2014, Yubileyny, Moscow Oblast Town Under Oblast Jurisdiction was merged into Korolyov City Under Oblast Jurisdiction and on the municipal side, Yubileyny Urban Okrug was merged into Korolyov Urban Okrug. The town of Yubileyny ceased to exist as an independent entity.

== Demographics ==
Historical population
Year	Pop.	±%
1939	28,122	—
1959	41,427	+47.3%
1970	105,945	+155.7%
1979	133,470	+26.0%
1989	159,363	+19.4%
2002	142,568	−10.5%
2010	183,402	+28.6%
2021	228,095	+24.4%
Source: Census data

As of 1 January 2016, Korolyov was in 93 place out of 1112 cities in Russia based on demographics.

On 2 June 2014, the city of Yubileniy officially became a part of Korolyov. With a total population of 220 thousand people, Korolyov became the third largest city in Moscow Oblast based on population after Balashikha (428,400) and Khimki (239 967).

== Politics ==
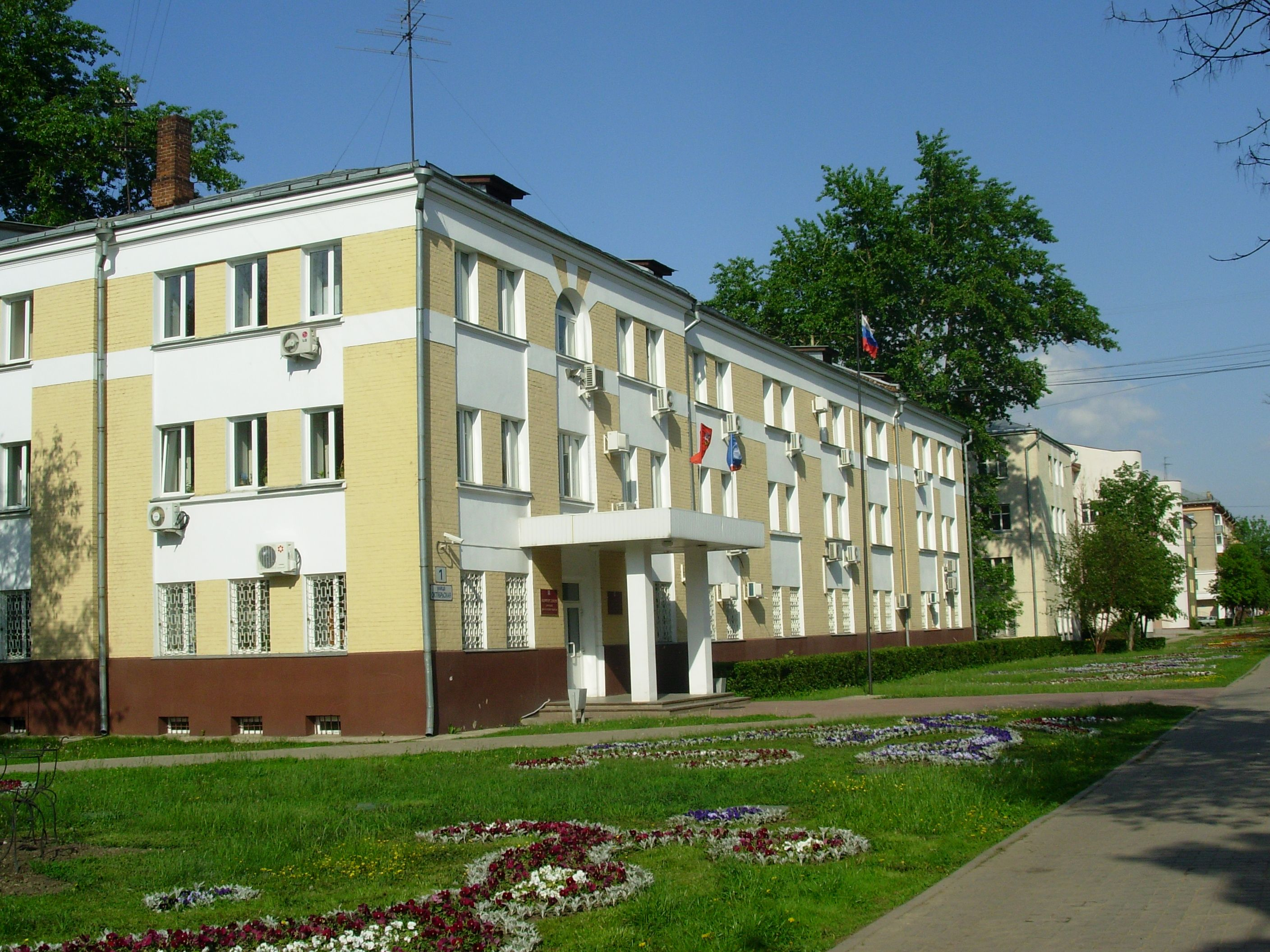
City administration building

During the implementation of the municipal reform, by 1 January 2006, Korolyov was granted the status of the Korolyov urban district as the only settlement within it.

=== Authorities ===
On 14 September 2014, the candidate from the United Russia party, Alexander Khodyrev, was elected head of Korolyov.

== Economy ==
The main enterprise of the city is the RKK Energia, but there are several kinds of industry in the city. This naukograd (science city) is the place in which the first Youth Residential Complex in the Soviet Union was built. Another notable company located in the city is OAO Kompozit, which is engaged in the field of materials science.

Today the city is prosperous overall. But in the Soviet-era economy, the city typified the wide contrasts and ironic juxtapositions that arose as some aspects of life were heavily funded by the government while others remained chronically underfunded. Yuri Krotkov described in his 1967 memoir how, at the same time that advanced technology was being built for space rockets, the textile plants of old Podlipki went on for decades with nearly no improvement on their 1920s equipment, and starkly impoverished workers in various hard and glamourless jobs of prerevolutionary days crossed paths, sometimes resentfully, with the skilled technicians and scientists, who were substantially better paid despite the slogans of Soviet ideology around the equal dignity of manual labourers.

== Sports ==
The bandy club Vympel has played in the Russian Bandy Supreme League, which is the second-highest division. Their home arena has a capacity of 10 000. A plan existed to equip the stadium with artificial ice, but the project has been abandoned. Although an indoor ice hockey-sized arena entered the plans instead, the official reason given was financial problems. Now Vympel only plays in the amateur league of Moscow Oblast. In 2014 a bandy federation for the city was founded.

== Notable people ==
The area was a place of elite dachas at the end of the 19th century and beginning of the 20th century. Many famous people, such as Konstantin Stanislavsky, Anton Chekhov, Valery Bryusov, Boris Pasternak, Anna Akhmatova, Isaac Levitan, Pavel Tretyakov, Marina Tsvetaeva and Vladimir Lenin, lived here.

== Twin towns and sister cities ==
Korolyov is twinned with:

- Zhukovsky, Russia
- Moscow, Russia
- Khimki, Russia
- Baikonur, Kazakhstan
