= Preger =

Preger is a surname, and may refer to:

- Andreja Preger (1912–2015), Serbian pianist
- Jack Preger (1930–2026), British doctor
- Marianne Preger-Simon (1929–2024), American dancer

== See also ==
- Prager, surname
