= Prager =

Prager (variants: Praeger, Preger) is a surname, which may refer to:

== Prager ==
- Alex Prager (born 1979), American art photographer and filmmaker
- David Prager (born 1977), American TV producer and blogger
- Dennis Prager (born 1948), U.S. conservative radio talk show host, columnist and public speaker
  - PragerU, a right-wing conservative non-profit organization that creates videos on various political, economic and philosophical topics
- Joshua P. Prager (born 1949), US physician
- Joshua Harris Prager, US journalist
- Mark Prager Lindo (1819–1879), Anglo-Dutch prose writer of English-Jewish descent
- Richard Prager (1883–1945), German-American astronomer
- Richard Prager (skier), West German para-alpine skier
- Stanley Prager (1917–1972), American actor and a television and theatre director
- Susan Westerberg Prager (born 1942), Association of American Law Schools Executive Vice President and executive director from 2008
- Walter Prager (1910–1984), Swiss alpine skier
- William Prager (1903–1980), German-born US physicist

=== Fictional characters ===
- Nick Prager, a character from Dead to Me, portrayed by Brandon Scott

== Präger ==
- Moses Präger (17th and 18th centuries), rabbi
- Roy Präger (b. 1971), German footballer

== Praeger ==
- Charles Praeger (1877–1940), architect
- Cheryl Praeger (born 1948), mathematician
- Emil Praeger (1882–1973), architect
- Ferdinand Praeger (1815–1891), composer and writer.
- Robert Lloyd Praeger (1865–1953), Irish naturalist and historian
- Rosamond Praeger (1867–1954), artist
- Sandy Praeger, Kansas Insurance Commissioner

== Preger, Preager ==
- Andreja Preger (1912–2015), Austro-Hungarian-born pianist
- Jack Preger (born 1930), British doctor working in the Indian city of Kolkata
- Lou Preager (1906–1978), British dance band leader

== See also ==
- Prager (crater), an impact crater on the Moon's far side
- Praeger Publishing, an imprint of the Greenwood Publishing Group
