= AG Virginis =

Eclipsing binary star in the constellation Virgo

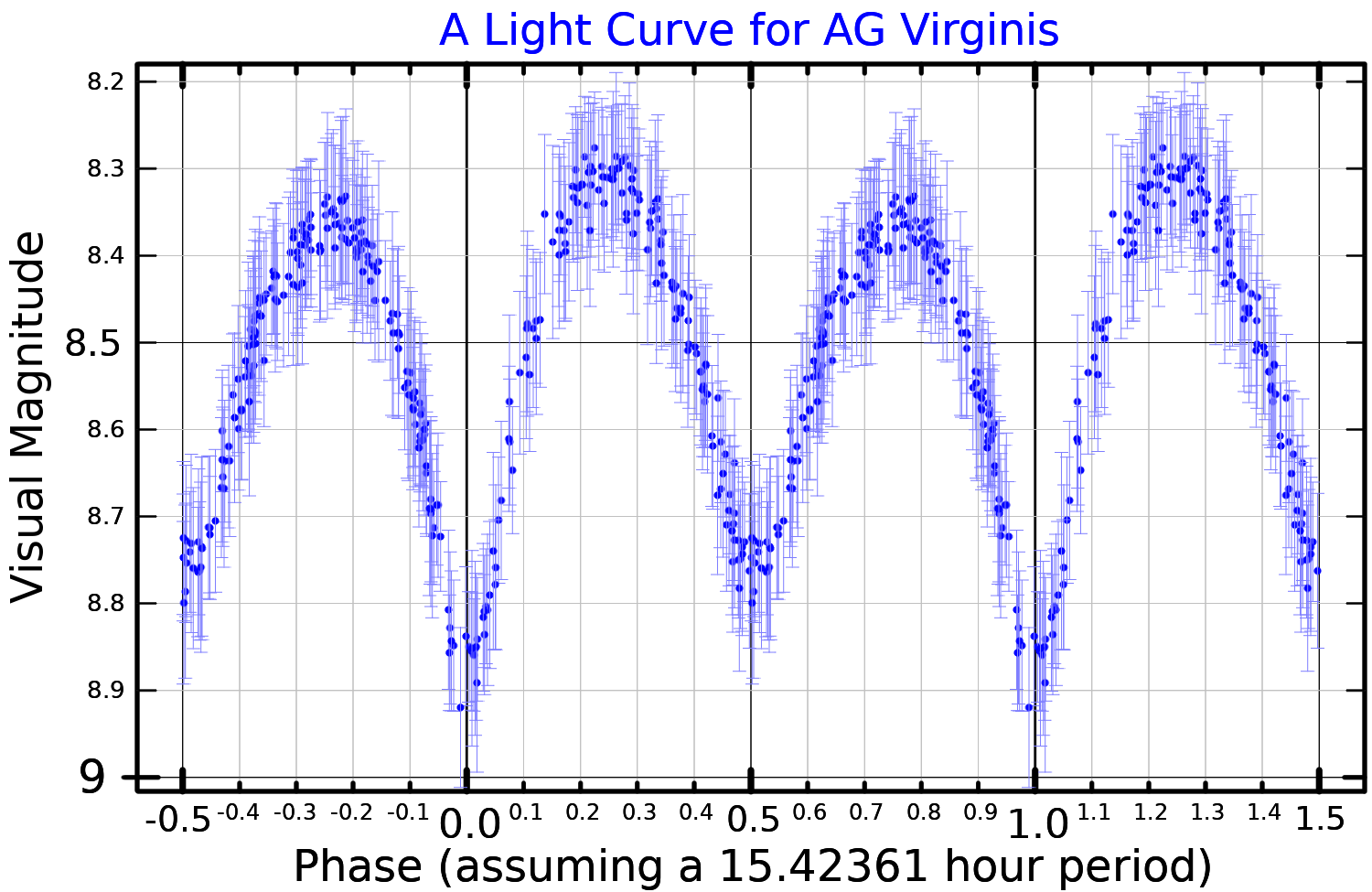
- A visual band light curve for AG Virginis, plotted from ASAS data

Observation data Epoch J2000.0 Equinox J2000.0
- Constellation: Virgo
- Right ascension: 12^{h} 01^{m} 03.504^{s}
- Declination: +13° 00′ 30.01″
- Apparent magnitude (V): 8.51

Characteristics
- Evolutionary stage: main sequence
- Spectral type: A7V-A9V
- B−V color index: 0.289±0.017
- Variable type: W UMa

Astrometry
Proper motion (μ)	RA: −2.740 mas/yr Dec.: −18.255 mas/yr
Parallax (π)	3.9564±0.0621 mas
Distance	820 ± 10 ly (253 ± 4 pc)

Orbit
Period (P)	0.6426507 d
Semi-major axis (a)	4.477 R_{☉}
Eccentricity (e)	0.00 (assumed)
Inclination (i)	84.40°
Periastron epoch (T)	53,501.5388±0.0013 MJD
Semi-amplitude (K_{1}) (primary)	93.39±1.06 km/s
Semi-amplitude (K_{2}) (secondary)	244.24±1.97 km/s

Details

Component 1
Mass	2.179 M_{☉}
Radius	2.185 R_{☉}
Luminosity	19.0 L_{☉}
Temperature	8,150 K
Metallicity [Fe/H]	−0.08±0.09 dex
Age	2.252 Gyr

Component 2
Mass	0.739 M_{☉}
Radius	1.356 R_{☉}
Luminosity	3.85 L_{☉}
Temperature	6,915 K

Other designations
- AG Vir, BD+13°2481, HD 104350, HIP 58605, SAO 99908, PPM 128717

Database references
SIMBAD	data

AG Virginis is an eclipsing binary star system in the equatorial constellation of Virgo. With a maximum apparent visual magnitude of 8.51 it is too faint to be visible to the naked eye. The system is located at a distance of approximately 820 light years from the Sun based on parallax measurements.

The variability of this system was first reported by P. Guthnick and R. Prager in 1929. R. S. Dugan determined the periodicity in 1933. C. Blanco and F. Catalano in 1970 proposed that this is a semidetached binary where the primary component has filled its Roche lobe, thereby allowing mass transfer. They noted that the orbital period appeared to vary slightly with a ~40 year cycle, which could be explained by a third component. In 1986, J. Kaluzny produced a model for the light curve which suggested this is instead a contact binary. Multiple observers noted a permanent asymmetry to the light curve, with the primary minimum appearing distorted. A localized "hot spot" hypothesis was proposed to explain this feature.

This is a close binary system with an orbital period of 15.4 hours. It is classified as a W Ursae Majoris variable, which means the components are in near contact with each other and their mutual gravitational influence is distorting their shapes. The components are separated by just 4.5 times the radius of the Sun, and the orbital plane is inclined at an angle of 84.4° to the line of sight from the Earth. This causes the two stars to eclipse each other during every orbit. The net visual brightness decreases by 0.58 in magnitude during the primary eclipse and by 0.45 during the secondary eclipse.

The combined spectrum of the system has a varying stellar classification in the range of A7V-A9V, matching an A-type main-sequence star. The primary component has 2.2 times the mass and radius of the Sun, while the secondary has 74% of the Sun's mass and 136% of the radius of the Sun.
