= AH Virginis =

Star in the constellation Virgo

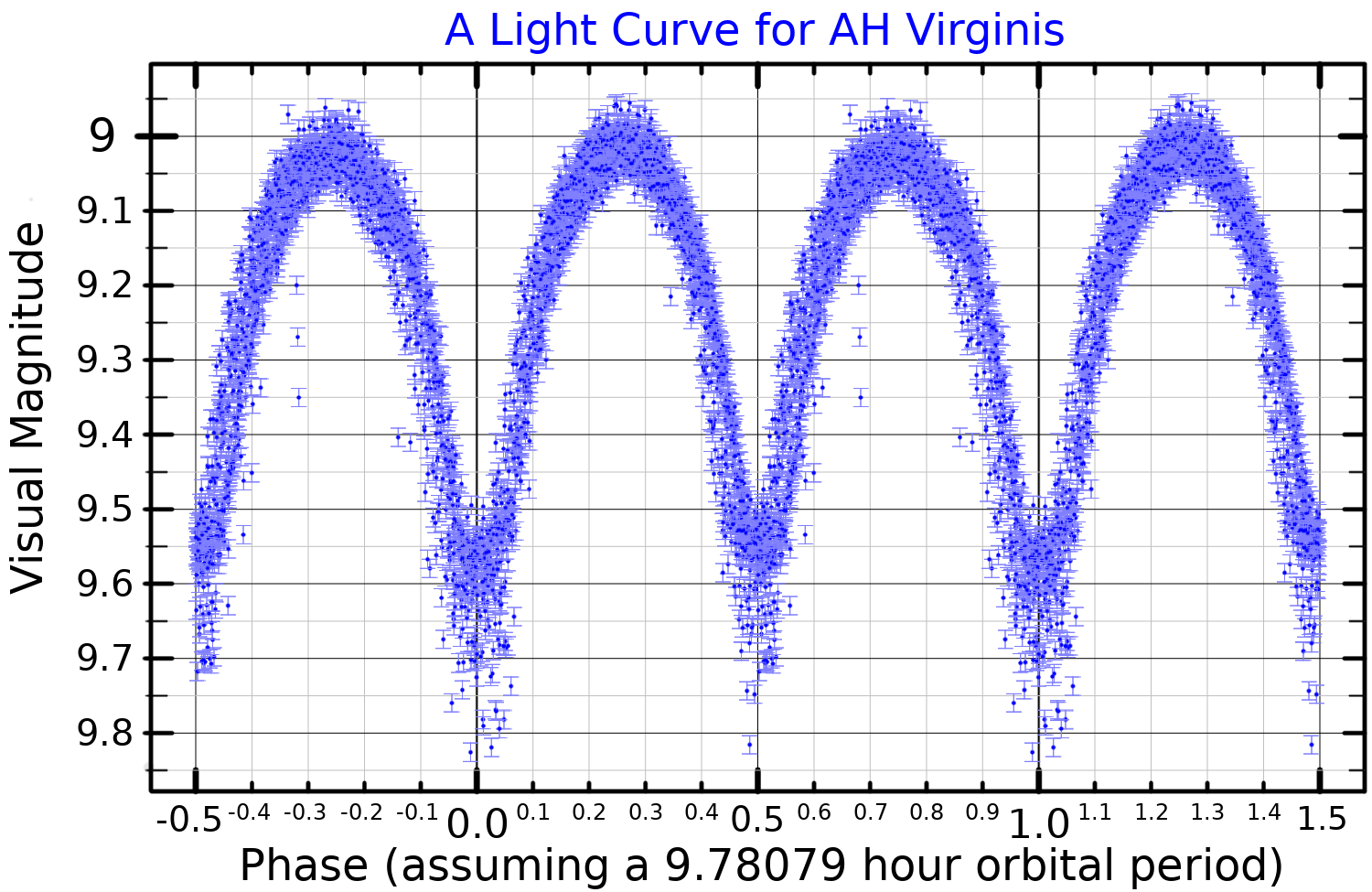
- A visual band light curve for AH Virginis, plotted from INTEGRAL-OMC data

Observation data Epoch J2000 Equinox ICRS
- Constellation: Virgo
- Right ascension: 12^{h} 14^{m} 20.996^{s}
- Declination: +11° 49′ 09.39″
- Apparent magnitude (V): 9.18

Characteristics
- Spectral type: G8V
- B−V color index: 0.81±0.25
- Variable type: Eclipsing W UMa

Astrometry
Radial velocity (R_{v})	6.6±0.9 km/s
Proper motion (μ)	RA: 47.828 mas/yr Dec.: −107.737 mas/yr
Parallax (π)	9.6552±0.0203 mas
Distance	337.8 ± 0.7 ly (103.6 ± 0.2 pc)
Absolute magnitude (M_{V})	4.25±0.16
Absolute bolometric magnitude (M_{bol})	4.07±0.16

Orbit
Period (P)	0.4075 d
Semi-major axis (a)	2.796±0.017 R_{☉}
Eccentricity (e)	0.0 (assumed)
Inclination (i)	85.2±1.2°
Periastron epoch (T)	2,448,765 JD
Argument of periastron (ω) (secondary)	0.0°
Semi-amplitude (K_{1}) (primary)	79.6±1.6 km/s
Semi-amplitude (K_{2}) (secondary)	263.5±1.9 km/s

Details

Primary
Mass	1.360 M_{☉}
Radius	1.397 R_{☉}
Luminosity	1.860 L_{☉}
Temperature	5,300 K
Age	4.622 Gyr

Secondary
Mass	0.412 M_{☉}
Radius	0.826 R_{☉}
Luminosity	0.634 L_{☉}
Temperature	5,671 K

Other designations
- AH Vir, BD+12°2437A, HD 106400A, HIP 59683A, SAO 100003A, WDS 12143+1149A

Database references
SIMBAD	data

AH Virginis is a contact binary star system in the equatorial constellation of Virgo, abbreviated AH Vir. It is a variable star with a brightness that peaks at an apparent visual magnitude of 9.18, making it too faint to be viewed with the naked eye. The distance to this system is approximately 338 light years based on parallax measurements, and it is drifting further away with a mean radial velocity of 7 km/s. O. J. Eggen in 1969 included this system as a probable member of the Wolf 630 group of co-moving stars.

In 1905, this source was identified as an optical double star by W. J. Hussey, with the pair showing an angular separation of 1.27″ along a position angle of 15.2°. Gaia Data Release 3 astrometry for the companion is flagged as potentially unreliable but shows a similar parallax and proper motion to AH Virginis.

The brighter visual component was found to be variable by P. Guthnick and R. Prager in 1929, and designated AH Vir. This component was determined to be a W Ursae Majoris variable, and an orbital period of 9.78 hours was found by F. Lause in 1934–1935. Y. C. Chang computed orbital elements of this close binary in 1948 and found the system is eclipsing.

In 1960, L. Binnendijk interpreted the particular shape of the light curve for AH Vir as being due to a sub-luminous region on the primary. Multiple observers noted frequent changes to the light curve and period over time, and in 1977 G. A. Bakos found emission in the calcium K line that suggested mass transfer is taking place. The amplitude of these changes compared to the overall brightness variation is among the largest known among W UMa-type variables. The primary eclipse is total with a duration of around 43 minutes. It was proposed in 1991 that the observed variations in the light curve may be caused by magnetic activity and magnetic interactions between the components.

There has been uncertainty as to whether the two stars are in direct contact with each other, or if the system is semi-detached with only the primary being close to its Roche lobe. The evidence now suggests that they are an overcontact system. The orbital period is showing an increase over time of (2.1869±0.0161)×10^{−7} d·yr^{−1}, combined with a cyclical variation with a period of 37.19 years. The system shows a strong level of magnetic activity, with the primary being the more active component. The mean magnetic field strength of the primary is estimated as 1.487 kG. The cyclical variation in orbital period may be related to the activity on the primary.
