= AC Andromedae =

Variable star in the constellation Andromeda

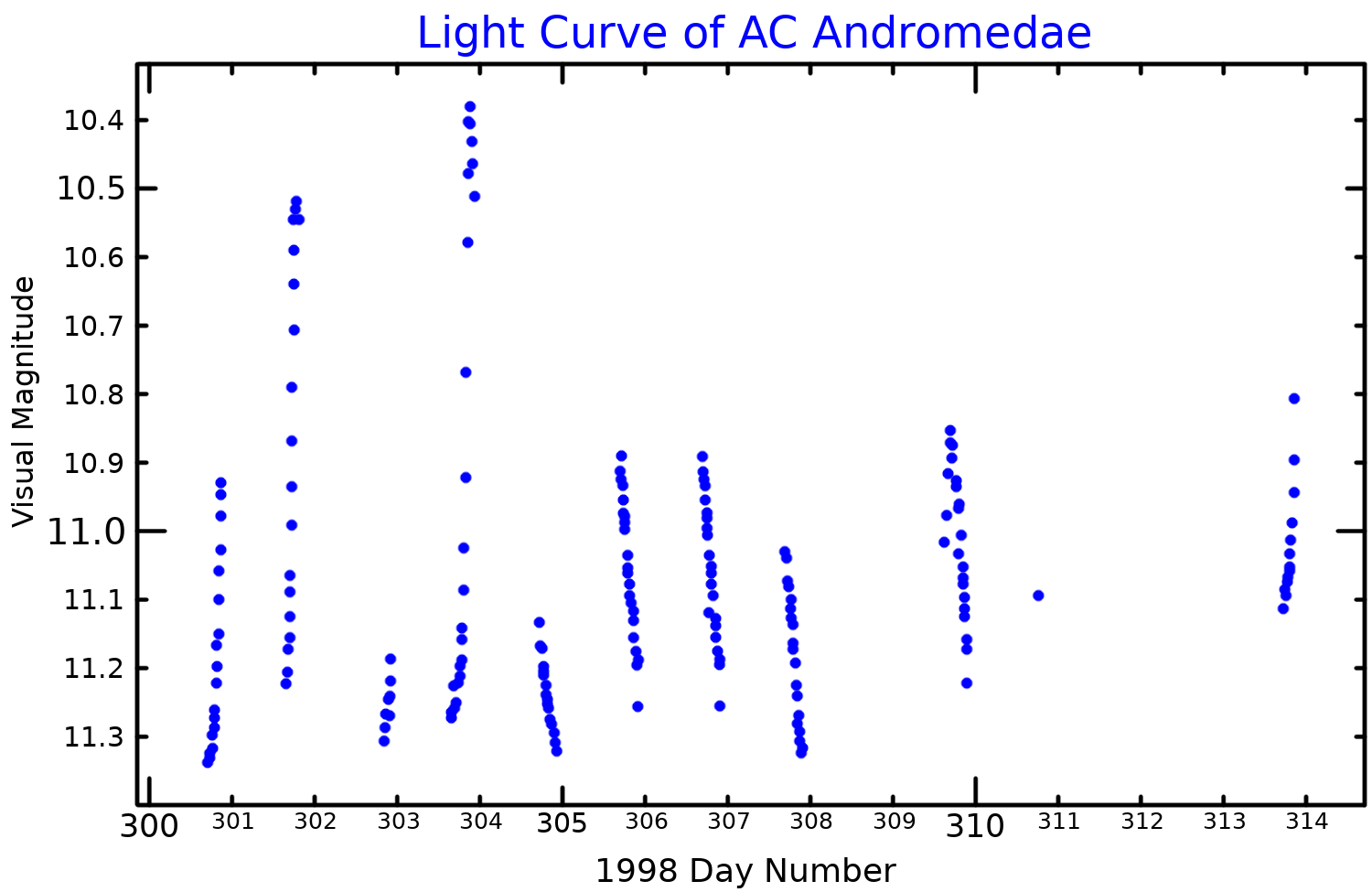
- A visual band light curve of AC Andromedae, from data presented by Peña et al.

Observation data Epoch J2000 Equinox ICRS
- Constellation: Andromeda
- Right ascension: 23^{h} 18^{m} 02.34605^{s}
- Declination: +48° 46′ 58.3403″
- Apparent magnitude (V): 10.7 – 11.9

Characteristics
- Spectral type: F5
- Apparent magnitude (B): 11.48
- Apparent magnitude (V): 10.90
- Apparent magnitude (G): 10.9002
- Apparent magnitude (J): 9.646
- Apparent magnitude (H): 9.483
- Apparent magnitude (K): 9.345
- B−V color index: 0.5389
- Variable type: Peculiar

Astrometry
Radial velocity (R_{v})	−50.0±2.8 km/s
Proper motion (μ)	RA: −2.160±0.012 mas/yr Dec.: −2.345±0.013 mas/yr
Parallax (π)	0.4948±0.0138 mas
Distance	6,600 ± 200 ly (2,020 ± 60 pc)
Absolute magnitude (M_{V})	−0.82

Details
Mass	3.4 M_{☉}
Radius	11 R_{☉}
Luminosity	170 L_{☉}
Surface gravity (log g)	2.76 cgs
Temperature	6,315 K
Metallicity [Fe/H]	−1.46 dex
Age	271 Myr

Other designations
- 2MASS J23180234+4846582, BD+47 4104, HIP 115046, TYC 3644-2114-1

Database references
SIMBAD	data

AC Andromedae (AC And) is a variable star in the constellation Andromeda. Its maximum apparent visual magnitude is 10.77, but can be seen fainter down to a magnitude of 11.9.

AC Andromedae was first reported to be a variable star by Paul Guthnick and Richard Prager in 1927. They noted that it varied in brightness rapidly, with no discernible period.

The nature of AC Andromedae is still not determined. Its light curve shows clearly three radial pulsation modes, the fundamental one with a period of 0.71 days, and the first two overtones of 0.525 and 0.421 days, respectively. It also displays the Blazhko effect with a modulation period of 2.11 days. It is unclear if it belongs to the class of RR Lyrae variables or to the one of Delta Scuti variables. Another study points at AC And as an intermediate object between classical Cepheids and Delta Scuti variables. The physical parameters of the star itself would be different depending on which class it belongs to.

By late 2018, the AC Andromedae was classified as rare "triple-mode" subtype of the dwarf cepheid (high-amplitude Delta Scuti variable).
