= Jonathan Reisman =

American physician (born 1981)

Jonathan Reisman (born 1981) is an American physician, author and public speaker. He has practiced medicine in remote and rural hospitals throughout the U.S. and around the world. He has written about the practice of medicine, human anatomy, nature, culture, travel and food for The New York Times, The Washington Post, Slate, and Discover, and is the author of the book The Unseen Body. He co-created the anatomy-based dinner series "Anatomy Eats."

== Early years and education ==
Reisman was born in 1981 in Englewood, New Jersey to Jewish parents. He grew up in northeastern New Jersey and attended Northern Valley Regional High School at Demarest in 1999.

Reisman earned a bachelor's degree in mathematics from New York University in 2001. After graduating, he worked and lived in Saint Petersburg, Russia as an intern with the Centre for Independent Social Research. He traveled throughout the country researching and writing about the Russian timber industry, nuclear pollution, and the international environmental movement. He also spent five months on the Kamchatka Peninsula studying the culture and subsistence practices of the region's indigenous peoples.

After returning from Russia, Reisman earned his Doctor of Medicine from Robert Wood Johnson Medical School in 2010. He completed a combined residency training in internal medicine and pediatrics at Harvard, at Massachusetts General Hospital, in 2014.

== Medical Career and Research ==
Since finishing his residency training, Reisman has worked in emergency departments throughout the U.S., including in Kotzebue, Alaska, Pine Ridge, South Dakota, and Pottsville, Pennsylvania. He also has experience in wilderness medicine, and has worked in Antarctica, on Wrangel Island, and at high-altitude in the Himalayas of Nepal. He has conducted global health research on neonatal resuscitation practices in India and Tanzania and infectious disease research among the Yupik of Alaska.

== Writing ==
Reisman's writing combines his interest in human anatomy and the practice of medicine with interests in the natural world, human culture, travel, food and prehistoric crafts. His first book 'The Unseen Body' is an exploration of the human body from the perspective of a naturalist and a traveler. It has been translated into six languages.

Jonathan has appeared on national and international radio programs and podcasts, including Fresh Air with Terry Gross, Science Friday, the Lex Fridman Podcast, and Meateater.

== Anatomy Eats ==
In 2018, Reisman co-founded Anatomy Eats, a dinner series where Reisman teams up with chefs to serve dishes containing offal, internal organs and other less commonly eaten body parts. As they eat, Reisman explains the anatomy and physiology of what guests are eating, tells stories from the practice of medicine, and sometimes dissects internal organs during the meal.

In January 2023, Reisman submitted an official petition to the USDA pushing to overturn the 1971 ban on selling animal lungs as human food. Reisman published an opinion essay in The New York Times laying out his argument.

== Charity ==
After volunteering for the charity Calcutta Rescue in [Kolkata], Reisman started a non-profit support group to raise money for them in the U.S. Called the "World Health and Education Network (WHEN)," Reisman's non-profit supports various medical and educational charities in the developing world.

== Bibliography ==
=== Book ===
- The Unseen Body: A Doctor's Journey Through the Hidden Wonders of Human Anatomy. (Flatiron, 2021)

=== Essays ===
- "Let Us Eat Lungs". The New York Times. February 14, 2023.
- "The Bodies That Guard Our Secrets". The New York Times. April 26, 2014.
- "Learning from Fungi". The New York Times. October 4, 2014.
- "Learning to love the secret language of urine". The Washington Post. November 23, 2016.
- "Some patients are in pain. Some just want drugs. How do I tell them apart?". The Washington Post. March 9, 2018.
- "The Fight for the Right to Eat Seal Blubber". Slate. October 9, 2017.
- "How I Learned to Love Liver". Slate. August 30, 2016.
- "A Common Mold, an Uncommon Killer" (PDF). Fungi. 2014.
- "A Poison Becomes a Means to a Cure" (PDF). Fungi. 2015.
- "The Mycobiome" (PDF). Fungi. 2016.
