= Praeger =

Praeger may refer to:

- The surname Praeger or its variants, see Prager (disambiguation)
- Praeger Publishing
