= Gamma Boötis =

Binary star system in the constellation Boötes

γ Boötis
- Location of γ Boötis (circled)

Observation data Epoch J2000 Equinox ICRS
- Constellation: Boötes
- Right ascension: 14^{h} 32^{m} 04.672^{s}
- Declination: +38° 18′ 29.69″
- Apparent magnitude (V): +3.03 +3.02 to +3.07

Characteristics
- Spectral type: A7 IV+(n) or A7 III
- U−B color index: +0.120
- B−V color index: +0.191
- Variable type: δ Sct

Astrometry
Radial velocity (R_{v})	−32.40±1.0 km/s
Proper motion (μ)	RA: −114.344 mas/yr Dec.: +151.788 mas/yr
Parallax (π)	37.9125±0.2550 mas
Distance	86.0 ± 0.6 ly (26.4 ± 0.2 pc)
Absolute magnitude (M_{V})	+0.93

Details

Aa
Mass	2.10 M_{☉}
Radius	4.03±0.04 R_{☉}
Luminosity	33.4 L_{☉}
Surface gravity (log g)	3.75±0.05 cgs
Temperature	7,800 K
Metallicity [Fe/H]	−0.08 dex
Rotational velocity (v sin i)	121 km/s
Age	0.9 or 1.0 Gyr

Other designations
- Seginus, Haris, Ceginus, Segin, Gamma Boo, 27 Boötis, BD+38°2565, FK5 535, GC 19607, HD 127762, HIP 71075, HR 5435, SAO 64203, PPM 77976, WDS J14321+3818A, BU 616

Database references
SIMBAD	data

Gamma Boötis is a binary star system in the northern constellation of Boötes the herdsman, forming the left shoulder of this asterism. Its name is a Bayer designation that is Latinised from γ Boötis, and abbreviated Gamma Boo or γ Boo. The primary component has the proper name Seginus, pronounced /sɪˈdʒaɪnəs/, the traditional name of the Gamma Bootis system. It has a white hue and is visible to the naked eye with a typical apparent visual magnitude of +3.03. Based on parallax measurements, it is located at a distance of 86 light-years, but is drifting closer to the Sun with a radial velocity of −32 km/s.

== Properties ==
The double nature of this system was discovered by American astronomer S. W. Burnham in 1878, and has the discovery code BU 616. The system is resolved into a pair separated by 33.4 arcseconds with a brightness difference of 9.7 magnitudes. The brighter primary is itself a close pair separated by 0.069″, as discovered by B. L. Morgan and associates in 1975. The primary or 'A' component of this double star system is designated WDS J14321+3818 ('B' is the star UCAC2 45176266) in the Washington Double Star Catalog. Parallax measurements for component B give a distance of approximately 1,879 light-years. Gamma Boötis' two components are themselves designated Gamma Boötis Aa (Seginus) and Ab.

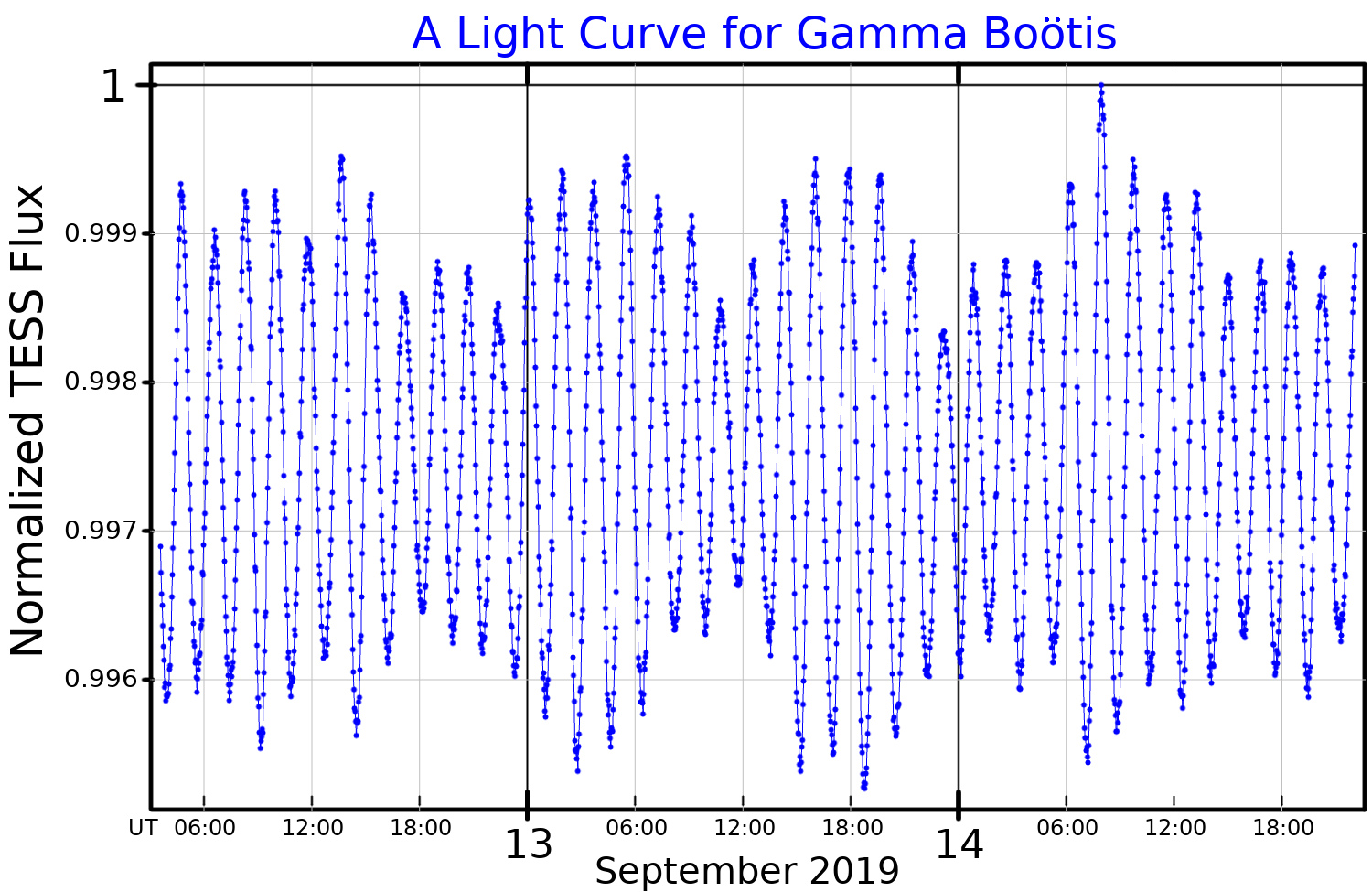
A light curve for Gamma Boötis, plotted from TESS data

The stellar classification of Gamma Boötis is A7IV+(n), matching an A-type star with somewhat "nebulous" lines due to rapid rotation. It was found to be a short-period variable star in 1914 by German astronomers P. Guthnick and R. Prager. Non-radial pulsations were detected in 1992 by Edward J. Kennelly and colleagues. It is a Delta Scuti-type variable star with a period of 6.96753 h that varies from magnitude +3.02 down to +3.07. This dominant mode is 21.28 cycles per day with an amplitude of 0.05 in magnitude. Additional pulsations occur at 18.09, 12.02, 11.70 and 5.06 cycles per day.

These types of stars are usually on the main sequence or slightly evolved. The primary is around one billion years old with 2.1 times the mass of the Sun and 4.65 times the Sun's radius. Measurements of the projected rotational velocity range from 115 to 145 km/s, suggesting a high rate of spin. On average, the star is radiating 33.4 times the luminosity of the Sun from its photosphere at an effective temperature of 7,800 K.

The system displays a statistically significant infrared excess due to a circumstellar disk. A model fit to the data indicates this material has a mean temperature of 85 K and is orbiting at a distance of 99±10 AU.

== Nomenclature ==
γ Boötis (Latinised to Gamma Boötis) is the binary's Bayer designation. WDS J14321+3818 is the wider system's designation in the Washington Double Star Catalog. The designations of the two constituents as WDS J14321+3818A and B, and those of A's components—WDS J14321+3818Aa and Ab—derive from the convention used by the Washington Multiplicity Catalog (WMC) for multiple star systems, and adopted by the International Astronomical Union (IAU).

Gamma Boötis bore the traditional name Ceginus (later Seginus), from cheguius or theguius, apparently Latin mistranscriptions of an Arabic rendering of Greek Boötes. Two possibilities have been suggested: from Arabic بوطس bwṭs, in one of the manuscripts of the Almagest, with undotted ب b mistaken for an undotted ث th, و w taken as w and spelled 'gu', and ط ṭ completely misread, or from Arabic بؤوتس bwʾwts, with undotted ب b mistaken for an undotted ث th, ؤ w-hamza mistaken for غ ġ, و w read as u, and undotted ن n misread as an undotted ى y and transcribed i—that is, as th-g-u-i-s with unwritten vowels (and the Latin grammatical ending -us) filled in for theguius.

In 2016, the IAU organized a Working Group on Star Names (WGSN) to catalogue and standardize proper names for stars. The WGSN decided to attribute proper names to individual stars rather than entire multiple systems. It approved the name Seginus for Gamma Boötis A on 21 August 2016 and it is now so included in the List of IAU-approved Star Names.

Gamma Boötis was listed as Haris in Bečvář, apparently derived from the Arabic name of the constellation of Boötes, Al-Haris Al-Sama meaning "the guard of the north".

In the catalogue of stars in the Calendarium of Al Achsasi al Mouakket, this star was designated Menkib al Aoua al Aisr (منكب العواء الأيسر – mankibu lʿawwaaʾi lʾaysar), which was translated into Latin as Humerus Sinister Latratoris, meaning 'the left shoulder of barker'.

In Chinese astronomy, Gamma Boötis is called 招搖, Pinyin: Zhāoyáo, meaning Twinkling Indicator, because this star is marking itself and standing alone in Twinkling Indicator asterism, Root mansion (see: Chinese constellation). 招搖 (Zhāoyáo), westernized into Chaou Yaou, but the name Chaou Yaou was designated for Beta Boötis (Nekkar) by R.H. Allen and the meaning is "to beckon, excite, or move."

=== Namesake ===
USS Seginus (AK-133) was a U.S. Navy Crater-class cargo ship named after the star.
