= Necho (crater) =

Crater on the Moon

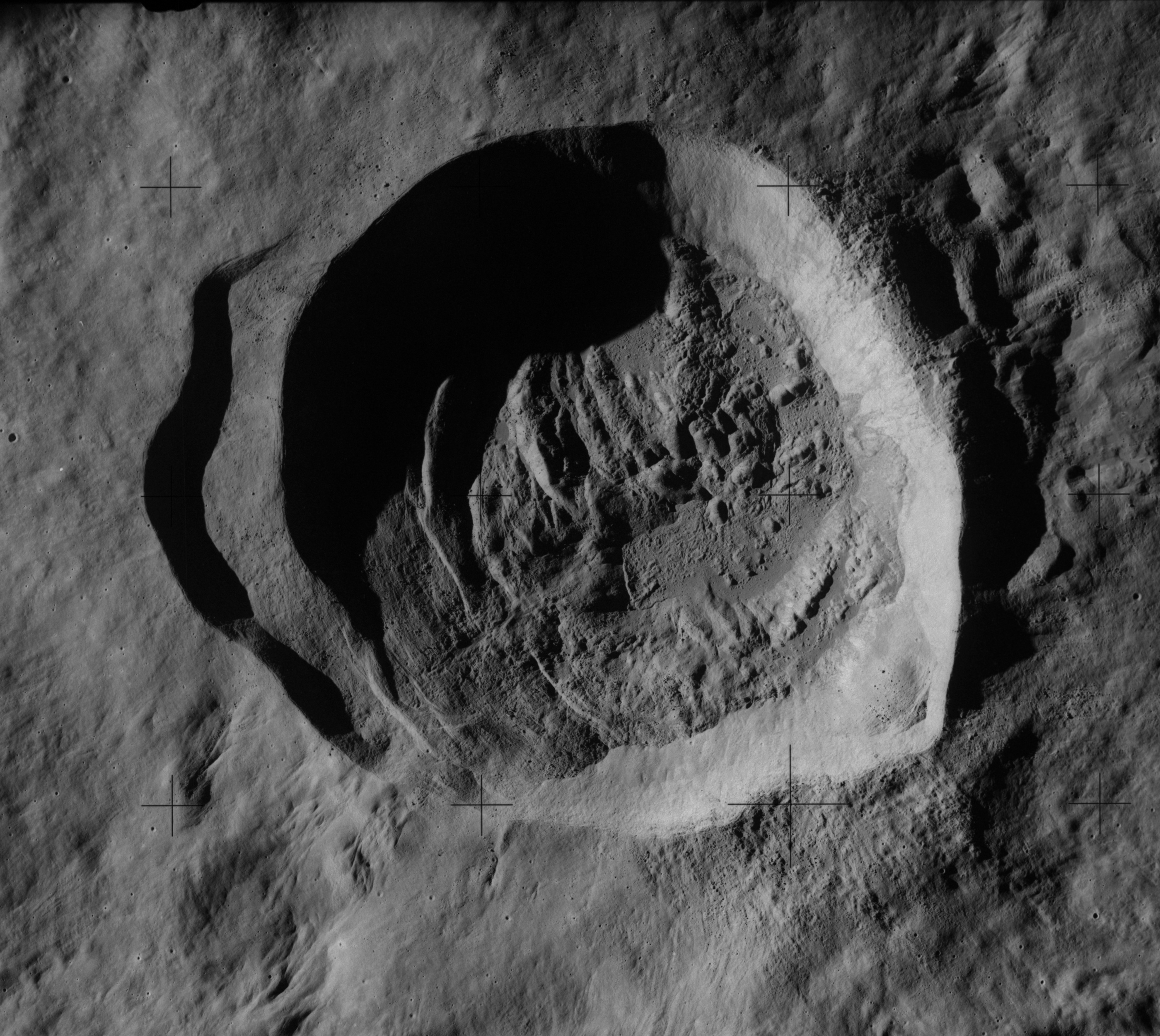
- Apollo 14 image
- Coordinates: 5.25°S 123.24°E
- Diameter: 36.87 km (22.91 mi)
- Depth: 3.8 km (2.4 mi)
- Colongitude: 237° at sunrise
- Formation: Copernican
- Eponym: Necho II

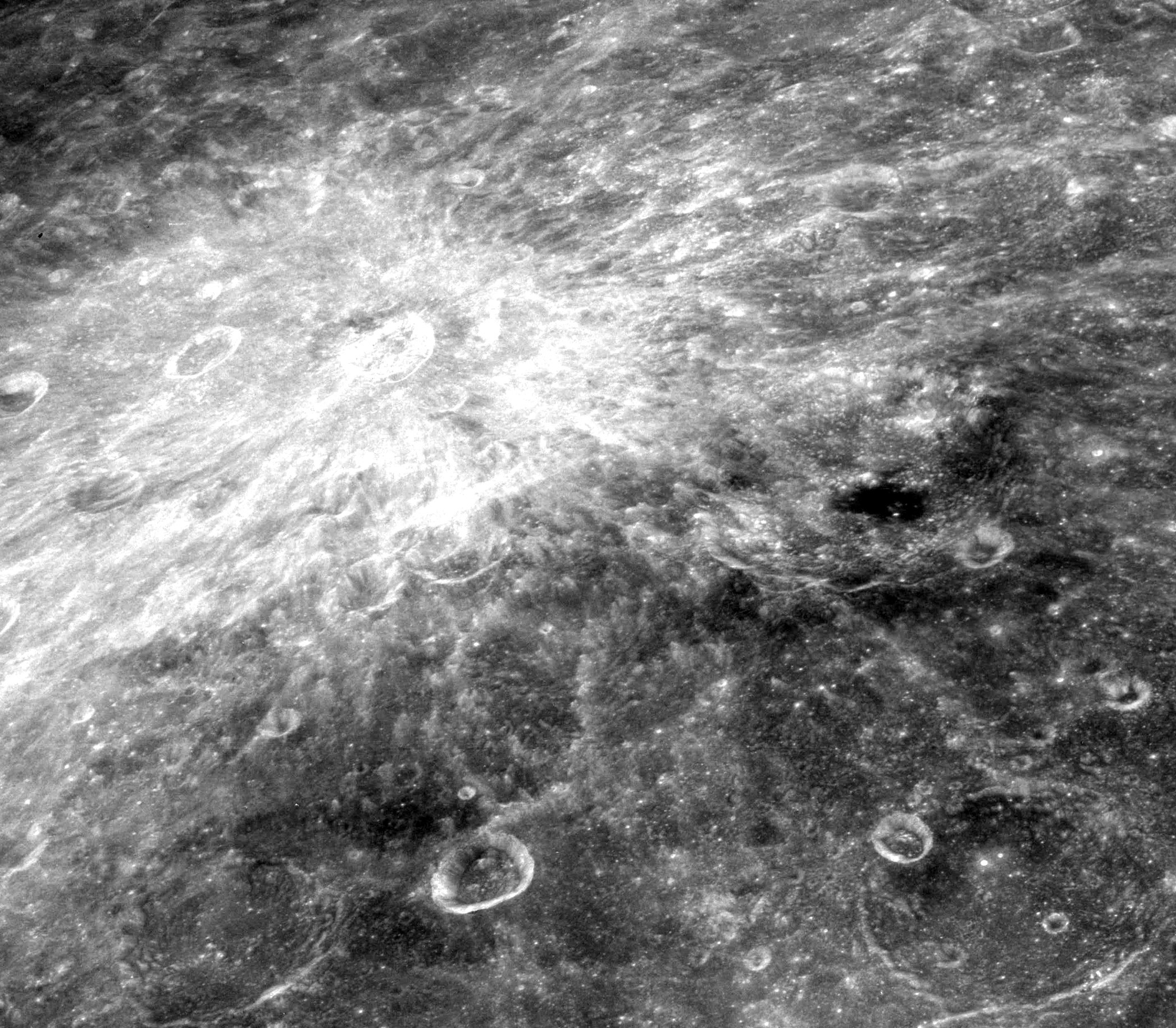
Necho's bright rays. Apollo 8 view facing east.

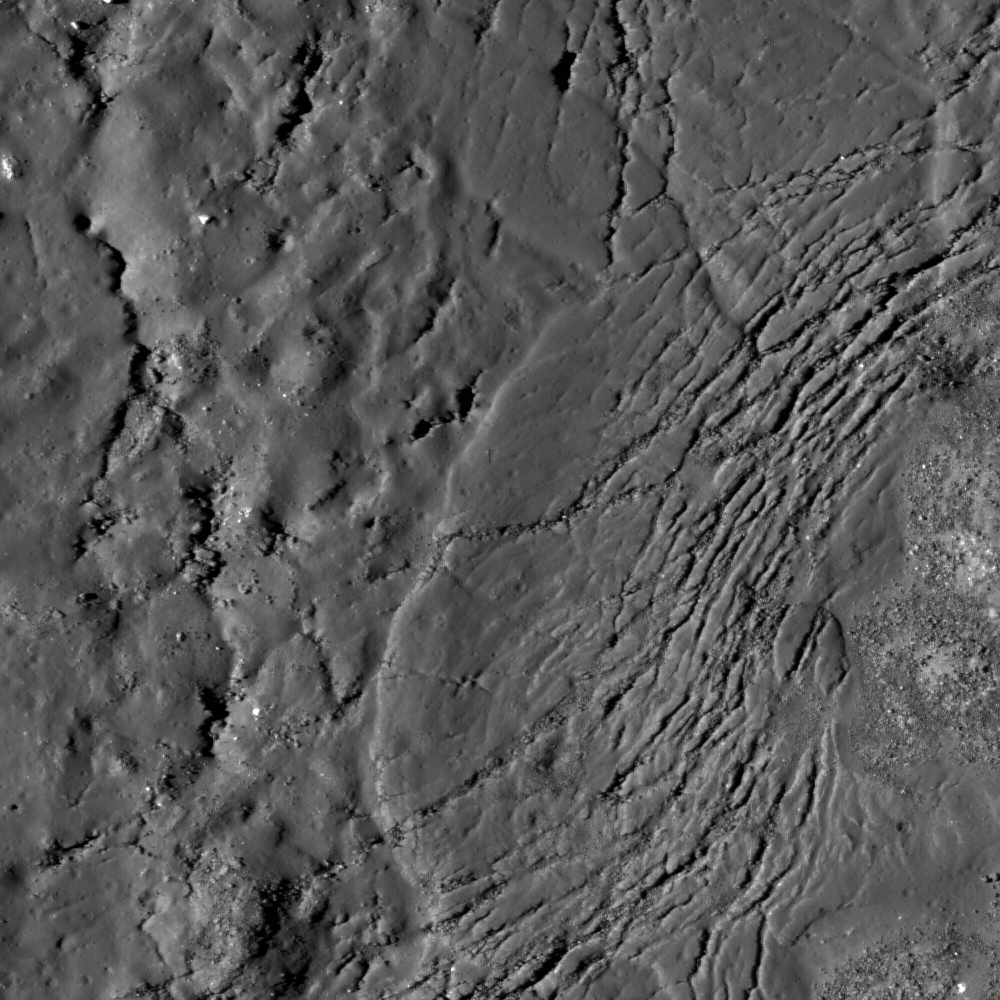
Cracks form in the impact melt sheet on the floor of Necho Crater, the southeast rim. Imaged by NASA's Lunar Reconnaissance Orbiter.

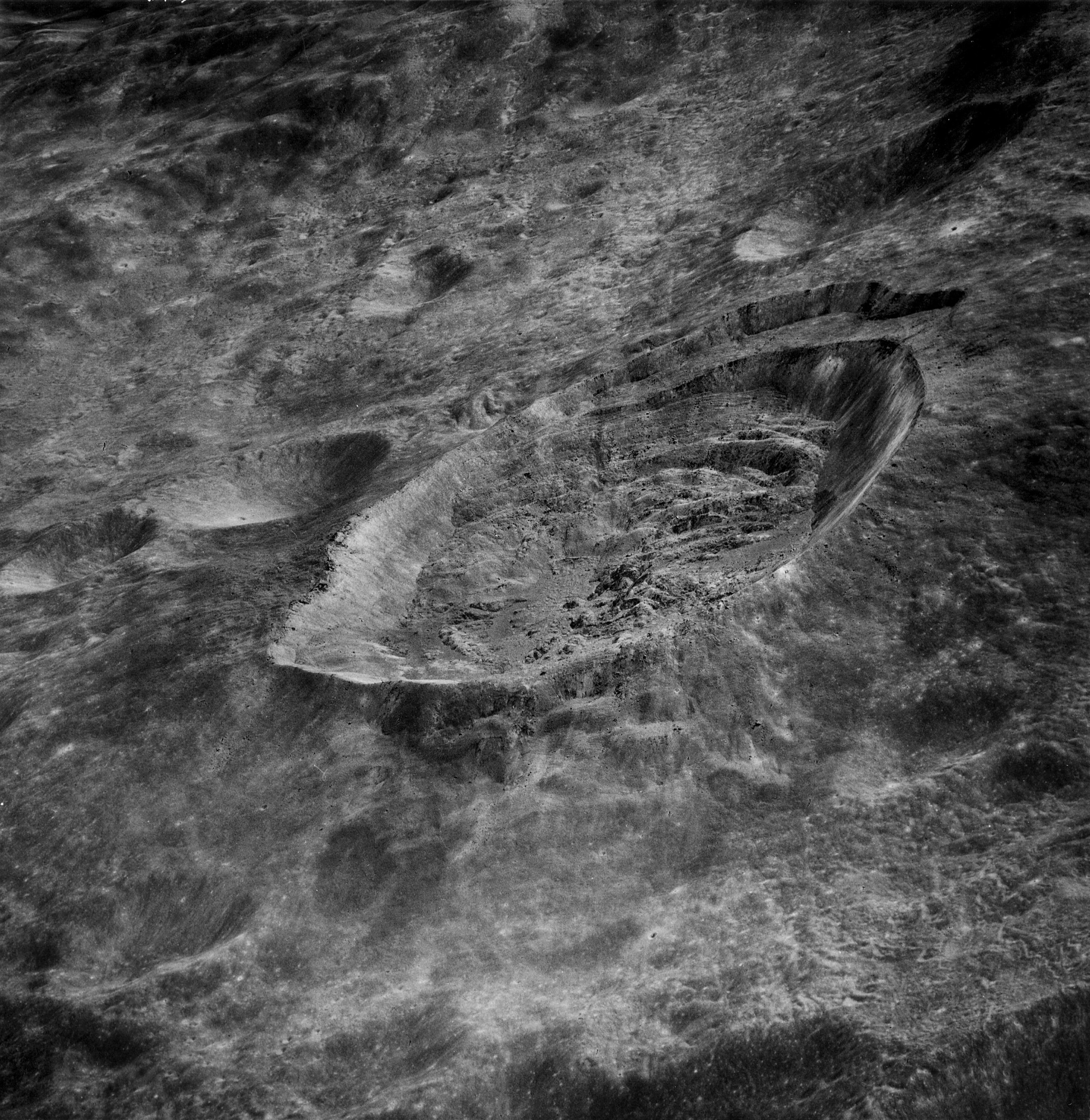
Oblique Apollo 10 image

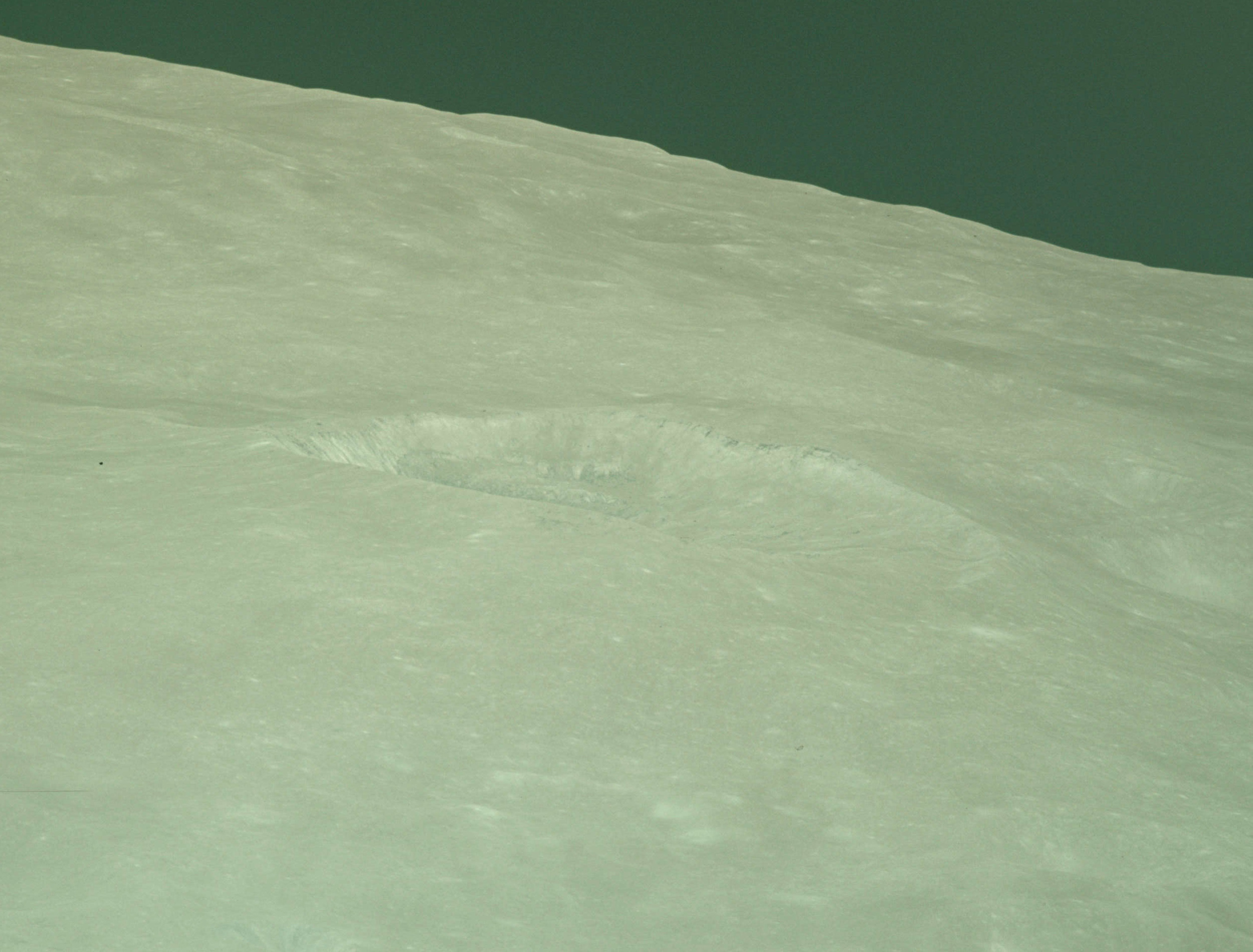
Highly oblique view also from Apollo 10

Necho is a lunar impact crater on the far side of the Moon, and therefore cannot be seen directly from the Earth. It lies to the northeast of the larger crater Langemak, about a crater diameter to the south-southwest of Bečvář and further east is Love.

== Description ==
This formation is less than 150 million years old, and so dates to the Copernican period of the lunar geologic timescale. It has a meteoritic iron-rich impact melt. The most distinctive aspect of this crater is the prominent ray system that surrounds the outer rim. This higher-albedo skirt of ejecta extends in a nearly continuous fashion out for several crater diameters, but is more extensive to the north and northeast than elsewhere. Beyond this continuous skirt, occasional rays and wisps of light material extend outwards for many more crater diameters.

The outer rim of Necho is somewhat uneven in form, particularly along the western side where it possesses two inner sides that overlap in almost spiral-like fashion. The rim has a slight outward bulge to the east, and is more uneven along that edge. The inner wall and floor has a high albedo, giving the crater a bright appearance. The inner side is generally wider on the western side, and the interior floor is offset to the eastern half.

The infrared spectrum of pure crystalline plagioclase has been identified on the interior floor. The mid-east and the middle part of the crater are mostly rough containing several hills.

== Naming ==
The crater is named after Necho II, the king of the Egyptian 26th Dynasty.

The crater was informally called "the Bright One" by the Apollo 14 crew. It was not formally named until 1976 by the IAU.

Necho lies at the south edge of an unnamed, highly subdued, 200 km diameter crater which was originally discovered during the Apollo 16 mission and reported by Farouk El-Baz. The name Necho was proposed for the unnamed crater, but the name was eventually adopted for this smaller crater.

== Satellite craters ==
By convention these features are identified on lunar maps by placing the letter on the side of the crater midpoint that is closest to Necho.

Necho	Latitude	Longitude	Diameter
M	6.0° S	123.1° E	12 km
P	6.8° S	122.0° E	75 km
R	5.6° S	122.0° E	18 km
V	4.3° S	120.6° E	16 km
