= CP Boötis =

Star in the constellation Boötes

Observation data Epoch J2000 Equinox J2000
- Constellation: Boötes
- Right ascension: 14^{h} 33^{m} 20.26330^{s}
- Declination: +36° 57′ 32.4483″
- Apparent magnitude (V): 6.40

Characteristics
- Evolutionary stage: subgiant
- Spectral type: F8 IVw
- U−B color index: 0.07
- B−V color index: 0.51
- Variable type: δ Sct

Astrometry
Radial velocity (R_{v})	+5.9 km/s
Proper motion (μ)	RA: +2.694 mas/yr Dec.: −73.096 mas/yr
Parallax (π)	12.9135±0.0244 mas
Distance	252.6 ± 0.5 ly (77.4 ± 0.1 pc)
Absolute magnitude (M_{V})	2.05

Details
Mass	1.77 M_{☉}
Luminosity	12.0+1.5 −1.3 L_{☉}
Surface gravity (log g)	3.67 cgs
Temperature	6,276 K
Metallicity [Fe/H]	0.25 dex
Rotational velocity (v sin i)	5.7 km/s
Age	1.70 Gyr

Other designations
- CP Boo, AAVSO 1429+37, BD+37°2545, HD 127986, HIP 71168, HR 5441, SAO 64212

Database references
SIMBAD	data

CP Boötis is a yellow-white hued star in the northern constellation of Boötes. With a baseline apparent visual magnitude of 6.40, it is at or near the lower limit for visibility with the typical naked eye in good viewing conditions. The distance to this star can be estimated from its annual parallax shift of 12.91 mas, which yields a range of 252.6 light years. It is moving further away with a heliocentric radial velocity of +5.9 km/s.

In May of 1977, Michel Auvergne et al. inadvertently discovered that the star is a variable star, when they used it as a comparison star for photometric observations of gamma Boötis. It was given its variable star designation, CP Boötis, in 1981.

This is an F-type subgiant star with a stellar classification of F8 IVw, which indicates it has nearly consumed the hydrogen at its core and is now evolving into a giant star. It is a low amplitude Delta Scuti variable that varies by 0.02 magnitude. At the age of 1.7 billion years it is spinning with a projected rotational velocity of 5.7 km/s. The star has 1.77 times the mass of the Sun and is radiating 12 times the Sun's luminosity from its photosphere at an effective temperature of 6,276 K.
