= Love (crater) =

Crater on the Moon

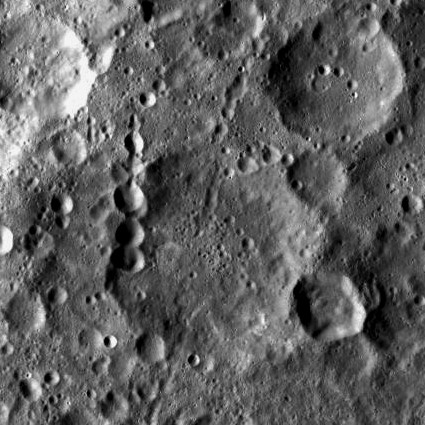
- LRO image
- Coordinates: 6.5°S 131.3°E
- Diameter: 90.1 km
- Depth: Unknown
- Colongitude: 228° at sunrise
- Eponym: Augustus E. H. Love

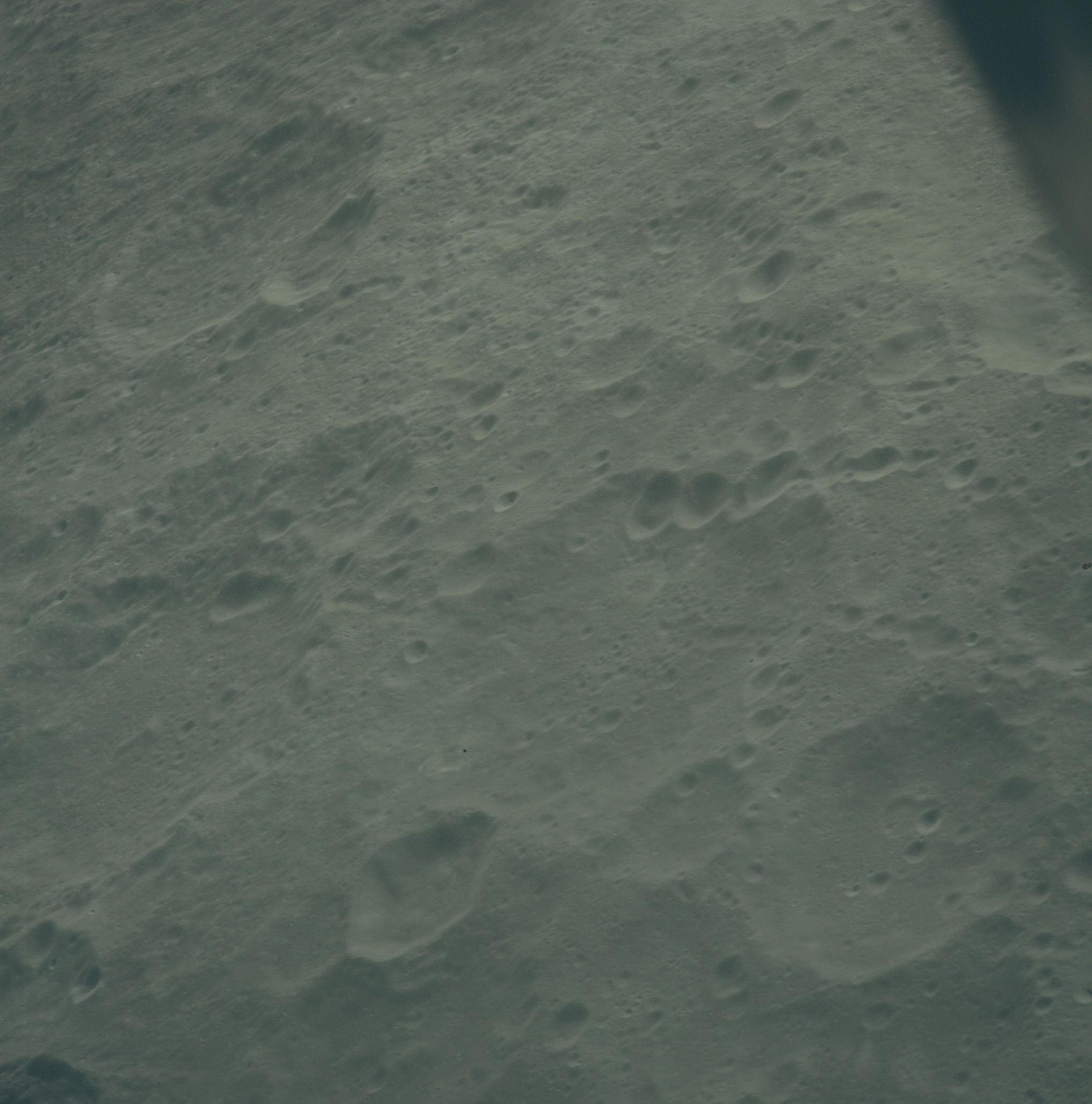
Oblique view from Apollo 13

Love is an impact crater on the far side of the Moon. It is located just to the north of the crater Perepelkin. Prager nearly touches the northeastern rim. To the northwest is Bečvář.

This is an eroded crater formation with several smaller craters along the rim. A chain of three small craters lies across the western rim and inner wall, and a crater cuts across the eastern rim. The inner walls have been worn and their features softened by impacts and possibly ejecta from other craters. The northern portion of the interior floor contains a considerable number of small craters that nearly form a continuous carpet in places. The southern floor is less impacted.

The crater was named after British mathematician and geophysicist Augustus Edward Hough Love by the International Astronomical Union in 1970. The crater was known as Crater 284 prior to naming.

== Satellite craters ==
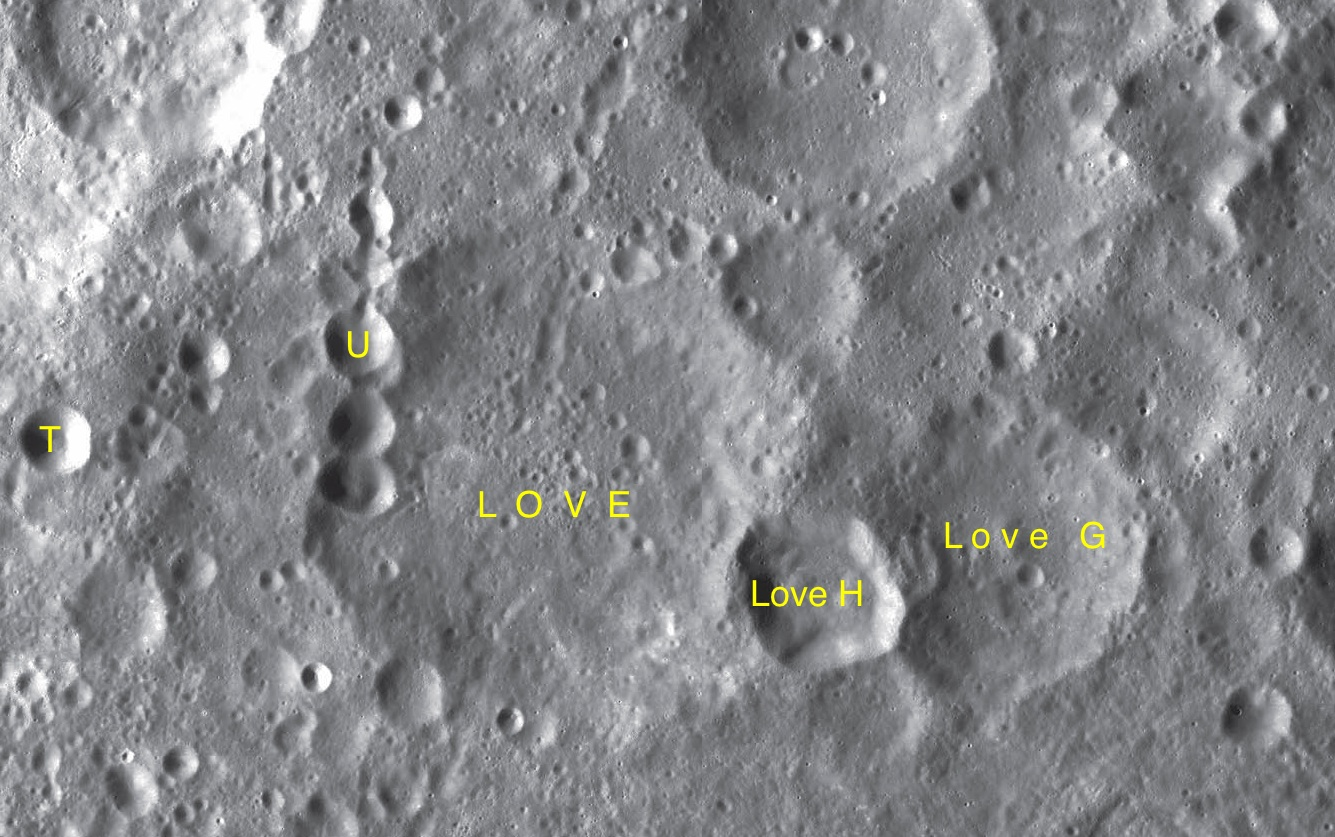
Love and its satellite craters

By convention these features are identified on lunar maps by placing the letter on the side of the crater midpoint that is closest to Love.

Love	Latitude	Longitude	Diameter
G	6.74° S	131.72° E	48.9 km
H	6.9° S	130.4° E	32.5 km
T	6.0° S	126.1° E	12.3 km
U	5.9° S	127.8° E	12.1 km
