= Merce Cunningham =

American dancer and choreographer (1919–2009)

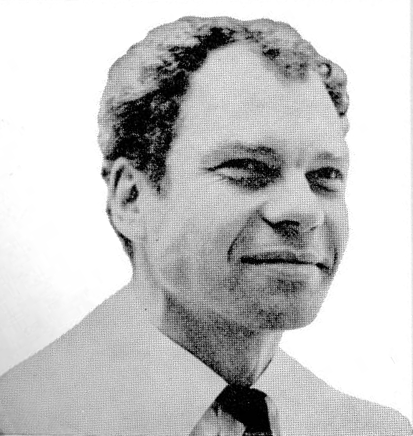
- Cunningham in 1961
- Born: Mercier Philip Cunningham; April 16, 1919; Centralia, Washington, U.S.
- Died: July 26, 2009 (aged 90); New York City, U.S.
- Occupations: Dancer; choreographer
- Years active: 1938–2009
- Partner: John Cage
- Website: mercecunningham.org

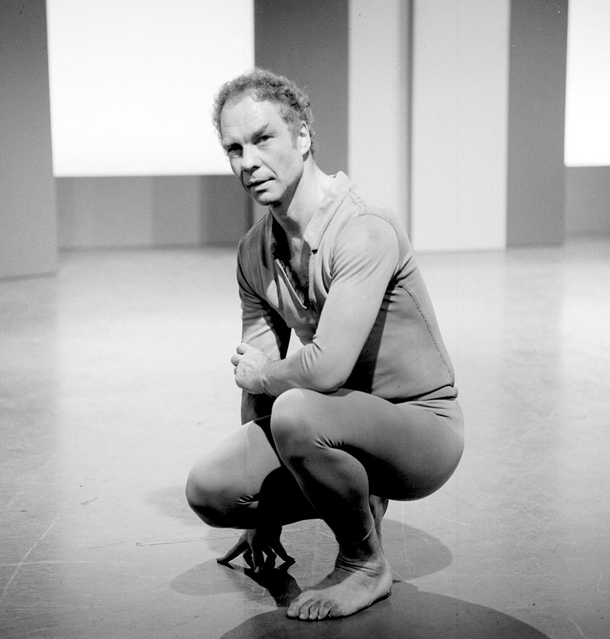
Merce Cunningham

Mercier "Merce" Philip Cunningham (April 16, 1919 – July 26, 2009) was an American dancer and choreographer who was at the forefront of American modern dance for over 70 years. He frequently collaborated with artists of other disciplines, including musicians John Cage, David Tudor, Brian Eno, and graphic artists Robert Rauschenberg, Bruce Nauman, Andy Warhol, Roy Lichtenstein, Frank Stella, and Jasper Johns; and fashion designer Rei Kawakubo. Works that he produced with these artists had a profound impact on avant-garde art beyond the world of dance.

As a choreographer, teacher, and leader of the Merce Cunningham Dance Company, Cunningham had a profound influence on modern dance. Many dancers who trained with Cunningham formed their own companies. They include Paul Taylor, Remy Charlip, Viola Farber, Charles Moulton, Karole Armitage, Deborah Hay, Robert Kovich, Foofwa d'Imobilité, Kimberly Bartosik, Flo Ankah, Jan Van Dyke, Jonah Bokaer, and Alice Reyes.

In 2009, the Cunningham Dance Foundation announced the Legacy Plan, a plan for the continuation of Cunningham's work and the celebration and preservation of his artistic legacy.

Cunningham earned some of the highest honours bestowed in the arts, including the National Medal of Arts and the MacArthur Fellowship. He also received Japan's Praemium Imperiale and a British Laurence Olivier Award, and was named Officier of the Légion d'honneur in France.

Cunningham's life and artistic vision have been the subject of numerous books, films, and exhibitions, and his works have been presented by groups including the Paris Opéra Ballet, New York City Ballet, American Ballet Theatre, White Oak Dance Project, and London's Rambert Dance Company.

== Biography ==
Merce Cunningham was born in Centralia, Washington, in 1919, the second of three sons. Both of his brothers followed their father, Clifford D. Cunningham, into the legal profession. Cunningham first experienced dance while living in Centralia. He took a tap dance class from a local teacher, Mrs Maude Barrett, whose energy and spirit taught him to love dance. Her emphasis on precise musical timing and rhythm provided him with a clear understanding of musicality that he implemented in his later dance pieces. He attended the Cornish College of the Arts in Seattle, headed by Nellie Cornish, from 1937 to 1939 to study acting, but found drama's reliance on text and miming too limiting and concrete. Cunningham preferred the ambiguous nature of dance, which gave him an outlet for exploration of movement. During this time, Martha Graham saw Cunningham dance and invited him to join her company. In 1939, Cunningham moved to New York City and danced as a soloist in the Martha Graham Dance Company for six years. He presented his first solo concert in New York in April 1944 with composer John Cage, who became his lifelong romantic partner and frequent collaborator until Cage's death in 1992.

In the summer of 1953, as a teacher in residence at Black Mountain College, Cunningham formed the Merce Cunningham Dance Company.

Throughout his career, Cunningham choreographed more than 200 dances and over 800 Events, or site-specific choreographic works. In 1963 he joined with Cage to create the Walker Art Center's first performance, instigating what would be a 25-year collaborative relationship with the Walker. In his performances, he often used the I Ching to determine the sequence of his dances and, often, dancers were not informed of the order until the night of the performance. In addition to his role as choreographer, Cunningham performed as a dancer in his company into the early 1990s.

In 1968 Cunningham published his book Changes: Notes on Choreography, edited by Francis Starr, containing various sketches of his choreography. A mural, located in Washington Hall on the campus of Centralia College, was created in honor of Cunningham.

Cunningham continued to live in New York City and lead his dance company as Artistic Director until his death. He presented his last work, a new work, Nearly Ninety, in April 2009, at the Brooklyn Academy of Music, New York, to mark his 90th birthday. Later that year he died in his home at the age of 90.

== Merce Cunningham Dance Company ==
Cunningham formed Merce Cunningham Dance Company (MCDC) at Black Mountain College in 1953. Guided by its leader's radical approach to space, time and technology, the company has forged a distinctive style, reflecting Cunningham's technique and illuminating the near limitless possibility for human movement.

The original company included dancers Carolyn Brown, Viola Farber, Marianne Preger-Simon, Paul Taylor, and Remy Charlip, and musicians John Cage and David Tudor. In 1964 the Cunningham Dance Foundation was established to support his work.

MCDC made its first international tour in 1964, visiting Europe and Asia.

From 1971 until its dissolution in 2012, the company was based in the Westbeth Artists Community in the West Village; for a time Cunningham himself lived a block away at 107 Bank Street, with John Cage.

On July 20, 1999, Merce Cunningham and Mikhail Baryshnikov performed together at the New York State Theater for Cunningham's 80th birthday.

In its later years, the company had a two-year residency at Dia Beacon, where MCDC performed Events, Cunningham's site-specific choreographic collages, in the galleries of Richard Serra, Dan Flavin, and Sol LeWitt, among others. In 2007, MCDC premiered XOVER, Cunningham's final collaboration with Rauschenberg, at Dartmouth College in New Hampshire. In 2009, MCDC premiered Cunningham's newest work, Nearly Ninety, at the Brooklyn Academy of Music. The company concluded its farewell tour on December 31, 2011, with a performance at the Park Avenue Armory.

== Artistic philosophy ==
=== Collaboration ===
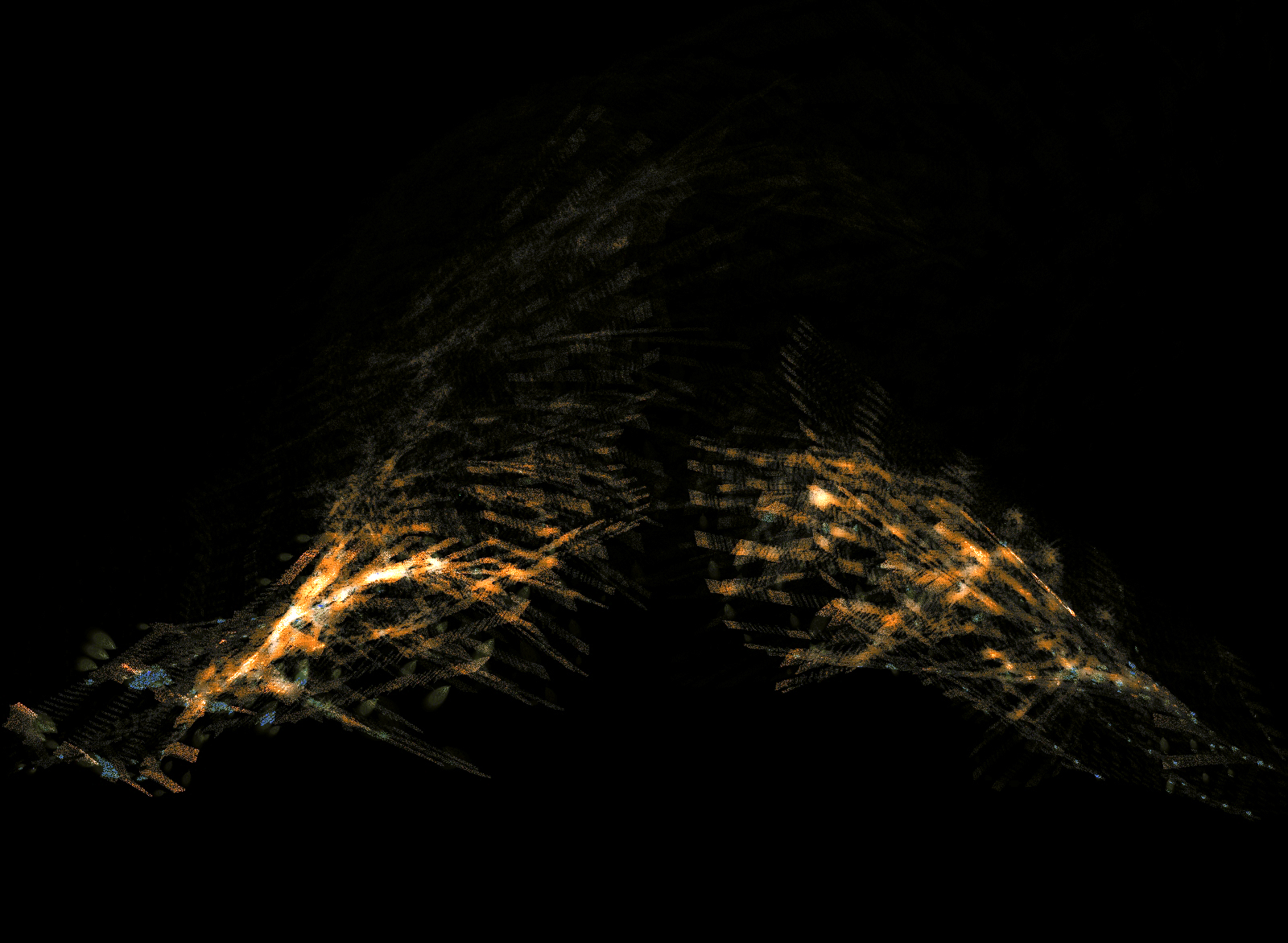
Still frame from Loops, a digital art collaboration with Cunningham and The OpenEnded Group that interprets Cunningham's motion-captured dance for the hands.

Merce Cunningham Dance Company frequently collaborated with visual artists, architects, designers, and musicians.

Many of Cunningham's most famous innovations were developed in collaboration with composer John Cage, his life partner. Cunningham and Cage used chance procedures to generate material, discarding many artistic traditions of narrative and form. Famously, they asserted that dance and its music should not be intentionally coordinated with one another.

John Cage, after his death, was succeeded in the role of music director by David Tudor. After 1995, MCDC's music director was Takehisa Kosugi. MCDC commissioned more work from contemporary composers than any other dance company. Its repertory included works by musicians ranging from Cage and Gordon Mumma to Gavin Bryars, as well as popular bands like Radiohead, Sigur Rós and Sonic Youth.

The company also collaborated with an array of visual artists and designers. Robert Rauschenberg, whose famous "Combines" reflect the approach he used to create décor for several MCDC's early works, served as the company's resident designer from 1954 through 1964. Jasper Johns followed as Artistic Advisor from 1967 until 1980, and Mark Lancaster from 1980 through 1984. The last Advisors to be appointed were William Anastasi and Dove Bradshaw in 1984. Other artists who have collaborated with MCDC include Daniel Arsham, Tacita Dean, Liz Phillips, Rei Kawakubo, Roy Lichtenstein, Bruce Nauman, Ernesto Neto, Frank Stella, Benedetta Tagliabue, and Andy Warhol.

=== Chance operations ===
John Cage and I became interested in the use of chance in the 50s. I think one of the very primary things that happened then was the publication of the "I Ching", the Chinese book of changes, from which you can cast your fortune: the hexagrams.

Cage took it to work in his way of making compositions then; and he used the idea of 64—the number of the hexagrams —to say that you had 64, for example, sounds; then you could cast, by chance, to find which sound first appeared, cast again, to say which sound came second, cast again, so that it's done by, in that sense, chance operations. Instead of finding out what you think should follow—say a particular sound—what did the I Ching suggest? Well, I took this also for dance.

I was working on a title called, "Untitled Solo", and I had made—using the chance operations—a series of movements written on scraps of paper for the legs and the arms, the head, all different. And it was done not to the music but with the music of Christian Wolff.

— Merce Cunningham, Merce Cunningham: A Lifetime of Dance, 2000

Cunningham valued the process of a work over the product. Because of his strong interest in the creation of the choreography he used chance procedures in his work. A chance procedure means that the order of the steps or sequence is unknown until the actual performance and is decided by chance. For instance in his work Suite by Chance he used the toss of a coin to determine how to put the choreographed sequences together. Indeterminacy was another part of Cunningham's work. Many of his pieces had sections or sequences that were rehearsed so that they could be put in any order and done at any time. Although the use of chance operations was considered an abrogation of artistic responsibility, Cunningham was thrilled by a process that arrives at works that could never have been created through traditional collaboration. This does not mean, however, that Cunningham considered every piece created in this fashion a masterpiece. Those dances that did not "work" were quickly dropped from the repertory, while those that did were celebrated as serendipitous discoveries.

Cunningham used "non-representational" choreography which simply emphasizes movement, and does not necessarily represent any historical narrative, emotional situation, or idea. Such non-representational dance appears in many styles throughout history, but was not commonly used by ballet or Martha Graham, Cunningham's primary influences. In the use of chance procedures, Cunningham abandoned the more traditional structured form of dance. He did not believe that dance needs a beginning, middle or end.

==== Examples in works ====
In Sixteen Dances for Soloist and Company of Three (1951), Cunningham used Indeterminacy for the first time in this piece; the changing element for each show was the sequence of the sections.

In Field Dances (1963), Cunningham experimented with giving the dancer more freedom. Each dancer was given a sequence of movements with which they could do as they pleased. This included exiting and entering at will, executing it in any order and as many times as desired.

In Story (1963), Cunningham experimented with the variables of costumes and sets. Before each performance dancers chose an outfit from a pile of second-hand clothes picked out by the designer, Robert Rauschenberg. Rauschenberg was also responsible for creating a new set for every show with items he found in the theatre.

Suite by Chance (1953) was his first work made entirely through chance procedures. Charts were created listing elements such as space, time, and positions. A coin was then tossed to determine each of these elements.

Canfield (1969) was created by using playing cards. Each movement was assigned a playing card and chosen randomly.

=== Use of technology ===
Cunningham's lifelong passion for exploration and innovation made him a leader in applying new technologies to the arts. He began investigating dance on film in the 1970s, and after 1991 choreographed using the computer program LifeForms, a software made by Zella Wolofsky, Tom Calvert, and Thecla Schiphorst. Cunningham explored motion capture technology with digital artists Paul Kaiser and Shelley Eshkar to create Hand-drawn Spaces, a three-screen animation that was commissioned by and premiered at SIGGRAPH in 1998. This led to a live dance for the stage, BIPED, for which Kaiser and Eshkar provided the projected decor. In 2008, Cunningham released his Loops choreography for the hands as motion-capture data under a Creative Commons license; this was the basis for the open-source collaboration of the same name with The OpenEnded Group.

Cunningham was one of the first choreographers to begin experimenting with film. He created an original work for the video Westbeth (1974) in collaboration with filmmaker Charles Atlas The computer program later became DanceForms and uses avatars of dancers with color-coded limbs as a platform for choreography.

In 2009, Cunningham's interest in new media led to the creation of the behind-the-scenes webcast Mondays with Merce.

=== Perspective ===
The use of stage space also changed in Cunningham's choreography. The "front and centre" spot traditionally coveted by soloists no longer exists in his works. Dance can take place on any part of the stage; it need not even be frontally oriented, but can be viewed from any angle (at performances in Cunningham's studio, for instance, audiences are seated in an L-shaped configuration). The viewer's focus is never directed to a particular spot; he must often decide among many centres of activity.

Merce Cunningham saw randomness and arbitrariness as positive qualities because they exist in real life. Most of Cunningham's choreographic process works to break the boundaries of "putting on a show", the removal of centre stage is an example of this—without a focal point for the audience, no one dancer or step holds the most value and can be seen as arbitrary ... or not.

== Legacy Plan ==
The Cunningham Dance Foundation announced the Legacy Plan in June 2009. The Plan provided a roadmap for the future of the Merce Cunningham Dance Company, as envisioned by Cunningham. The first of its kind in the dance world, the plan represented Cunningham's vision for continuing his work in the upcoming years, transitioning his company once he was no longer able to lead it, and preserving his oeuvre.

The Legacy Plan included a comprehensive digital documentation and preservation program, which ensures that pieces from his repertory can be studied, performed and enjoyed by future generations with knowledge of how they originally came to life. By other provisions of the plan, the Merce Cunningham Trust, established by Cunningham to serve as the custodian for his works, controls his dances for licensing purposes; Cunningham associates prepared detailed records of the dances so they could be licensed and given authentic productions by other companies. The Legacy Plan also outlined a final international tour for the company, and, ultimately, the closure of the Cunningham Dance Foundation and Merce Cunningham Dance Company and the transfer of all assets to the Merce Cunningham Trust. From Merce's death at age 90 through the Board's last meeting in 2012, the Legacy Plan implemented his wish that the company complete a worldwide legacy tour and then close. The final performance of the Merce Cunningham Dance Company was on December 31, 2011, at the Park Avenue Armory in New York City.

The final meeting of the board of directors for the Merce Cunningham Dance Company was held March 15, 2012, in Cunningham's studio at the top of the Westbeth building in the West Village.

== Exhibitions ==
There have been numerous exhibitions dedicated to Cunningham's work. Also, his visual art was represented by Margarete Roeder Gallery until her death on December 11, 2023.

The major exhibition Invention: Merce Cunningham & Collaborators at the New York Public Library for the Performing Arts closed on October 13, 2007.

Merce Cunningham: Dancing on the Cutting Edge, an exhibition of recent design for MCDC, opened at the Museum of Contemporary Art in North Miami in January 2007.

A trio of exhibitions devoted to John Cage, Robert Rauschenberg, and Merce Cunningham was curated by Ron Bishop and shown in the spring of 2002 at the Gallery of Fine Art at Edison College in Fort Myers, Florida.

A major exhibition about Cunningham and his collaborations, curated by Germano Celant, was first seen at the Fundació Antoni Tàpies in Barcelona in 1999, and subsequently at the Fundação de Serralves in Porto, Portugal in 1999; the Museum Moderner Kunst Stiftung Ludwig in Vienna in 2000; and at the Museo d'Arte Contemporanea, Castello di Rivoli in Turin in 2000.

Five Friends: John Cage, Merce Cunningham, Jasper Johns, Robert Rauschenberg, Cy Twombly is an exhibition focused on their friendship and collaboration in different artistic genres. The exhibit was a collaboration between Museum Brandhorst and Museum Ludwig; it was displayed at the Brandhorst from April 10 to August 17, 2025 and at Ludwig from October 3, 2025 to January 11, 2026. The catalog was published in both English and German. ISBN 978-3-8296-1043-8

== Selected works ==
Cunningham choreographed almost 200 works for his company.

Year(s)	Title	Music	Costumes	Lighting	Decor	Notes	Ref
1956-1958	Suite for Five	John Cage's Music for Piano	Robert Rauschenberg	Beverly Emmons			
1960	Crises	Conlon Nancarrow's Rhythm Studies for Player Piano	Robert Rauschenberg	Robert Rauschenberg			
1968	Rainforest	David Tudor	Jasper Johns (uncredited)	Richard Nelson	Andy Warhol's Silver Clouds		
1970	Second Hand	John Cage's Cheap Imitation	Jasper Johns	Richard Nelson (1970); Christine Shallenberg (2008)	Jasper Johns		
1975	Sounddance	David Tudor's Toneburst & Untitled (1975/1994)	Mark Lancaster	Mark Lancaster	Mark Lancaster		
1987	Fabrications	Emanuel Dimas de Melo Pimenta's Short Waves & SBbr	Dove Bradshaw	Josh Johnson	Dove Bradshaw		
1993	CRWDSPCR	John King's blues 99	Mark Lancaster	Mark Lancaster	Mark Lancaster		
1994	Ocean	David Tudor's Soundings: Ocean Diary; Andrew Culver's Ocean 1–95	Marsha Skinner	Marsha Skinner	Marsha Skinner		
1999	BIPED	Gavin Bryars's Biped	Suzanne Gallo	Aaron Copp	Paul Kaiser, Shelley Eshkar		
2003	Split Sides	Radiohead & Sigur Rós	James Hall	James F. Ingalls	Robert Heishman, Catherine Yass		
2004	Views on Stage	John Cage's ASLSP & Music for Two	James Hall	Josh Johnson	Ernesto Neto, Other Animal		
2006	eyeSpace	Mikel Rouse's International Cloud Atlas	Henry Samelson	Josh Johnson	Henry Samelson's Blues Arrive Not Anticipating What Transpires Even Between Themselves		
2007	eyeSpace	David Behrman's Long Throw and/or Annea Lockwood's Jitterbug	Daniel Arsham	Josh Johnson	Daniel Arsham's ODE/EON		
2007	XOVER	John Cage's Aria (1958) & Fontana Mix (1958)	Robert Rauschenberg's Plank	Josh Johnson	Robert Rauschenberg's Plank		
2009	Nearly Ninety	John Paul Jones, Takehisa Kosugi, Sonic Youth	Romeo Gigli's io ipse idem	Brian MacDevitt	Benedetta Tagliabue	Video design by Franc Aleu	

== Honors and awards ==
Year	Award	Issuing body	Ref
1954	Guggenheim Fellowship	John Simon Guggenheim Memorial Foundation	
1959	Guggenheim Fellowship	John Simon Guggenheim Memorial Foundation	
1960	Dance Magazine Award	Dance Magazine	
1964	Medal	Society for the Advancement of Dancing in Sweden	
1966	Gold medal for Choreographic Innovation	International Festival of Dance	
1972	BITEF Award	Belgrade International Theatre Festival	
1972	Honorary degree	University of Illinois, Urbana-Champaign	
1975	New York State Award	New York	
1977	Capezio Dance Award	Capezio	
1982	Samuel H. Scripps American Dance Festival Award for Lifetime Achievement in Choreography	American Dance Festival	
1982	Commandeur	Ordre des Arts et des Lettres	
1983	Award of Honor for Arts and Culture	New York	
1984	Honorary membership	American Academy of Arts and Letters	
1985	Laurence Olivier Award for Best New Dance Production	Society of London Theatre	
1985	Kennedy Center Honors	John F. Kennedy Center for the Performing Arts	
1985	MacArthur Fellowship	MacArthur Foundation	
1987	Algur H. Meadows Award for Excellence in the Arts	Southern Methodist University	
1988	Dance/USA National Honor		
1989	Chevalier	Ordre national de la Légion d'honneur	
1990	National Medal of Arts	United States Congress	
1990	Porselli Prize		
1990	Digital Dance Premier Award		
1990	Award of Merit	Association of Performing Arts Presenters	
1993	Induction	National Museum of Dance and Hall of Fame	
1993	Dance and Performance Award for Best Performance by a Visiting Artist		
1993	Medal of Honor	Complutense University of Madrid	
1993	Wexner Prize (with John Cage)	Wexner Center for the Arts	
1993	Bessie Awards	Dance Theater Workshop	
1993	Tiffany Award	International Society of Performing Arts Administrators	
1995	Honorary degree	Wesleyan University	
1995	Carina Ari Award Grand Prix Video Danse with Elliot Caplan		
1995	Golden Lion	Venice Biennale	
1995	Nellie Cornish Arts Achievement Award	Cornish College of the Arts	
1997	Medal of Distinction	Barnard College	
1997	Grand Prix	Société des Auteurs et Compositeurs Dramatiques	
1998	Established Artists Award	Bagley Wright Fund	
1999	Gino Tani Prize for the Art of Dance		
1999	Handel Medallion	New York City	
1999	Isadora Duncan Dance Award for Lifetime Achievement		
1999	Fellow	Hong Kong Academy for Performing Arts	
1999	Key to the City	Montpellier, France	
2000	Nijinsky Special Prize		
2000	The Dorothy and Lillian Gish Prize	Dorothy and Lillian Gish Prize Trust	
2000	Living Legend	Library of Congress	
2001	Coat of Arms	Mulhouse, France	
2001	Medal of the City of Paris	Mayor of Paris	
2001	Award	Career Transition For Dancers	
2001	Herald Archangel Award		
2001	Village Award	Greenwich Village Society for Historic Preservation	
2001	Honorary degree	Edith Cowan University	
2002	Kitty Carlisle Hart Award for Outstanding Achievement in the Arts	Arts & Business Council	
2002	MATA Award	Music at the Anthology	
2002	Medal of the city	Dijon, France	
2003	Edward MacDowell Medal	MacDowell	
2004	Officier	Ordre national de la Légion d'honneur	
2005	Honorary doctorate of human letters	University of Minnesota	
2005	Praemium Imperiale	Japan Art Association	
2006	Honorary doctorate of Fine Arts	Cornish College of the Arts	
2007	Nelson A. Rockefeller Award	Purchase College School of the Arts	
2007	Montgomery Fellow	Dartmouth College	
2008	Honorary doctorate of Fine Arts	Bard College	
2009	Dance Award	Jacob's Pillow Dance	
2009	Skowhegan Medal for Performance		

== See also ==
- List of dancers

== Sources ==
- Bredow, Moritz von. 2012. "Rebellische Pianistin. Das Leben der Grete Sultan zwischen Berlin und New York." (Biography, 368 pp, in German). Schott Music, Mainz, Germany. ISBN 978-3-7957-0800-9 (Biography on pianist Grete Sultan, John Cages's and Merce Cunningham's close friend. Many aspects regarding Cage and Cunningham!)
- Bremser, M. (Ed) (1999), Fifty Contemporary Choreographers. Routledge. ISBN 0-415-10364-9
- Cunningham, Merce (1968), Changes/Notes on Choreography. Something Else Press.
- Cunningham, M. and Lesschaeve, J. (1992), The Dancer and the Dance. Marion Boyars Publishers. ISBN 0-7145-2931-1
- Vaughan, David (1999), Merce Cunningham: Fifty Years. Aperture. ISBN 0-89381-863-1
- Vaughan, D. and Cunningham, M. (2002), Other Animals. Aperture. ISBN 978-0-89381-946-0
- Kostelanetz, R. (1998), Merce Cunningham: Dancing in Space and Time. Da Capo Press. ISBN 0-306-80877-3
- Brown, Carolyn (2007), Chance and Circumstance: Twenty Years with Cage and Cunningham. Alfred A. Knopf. ISBN 978-0-394-40191-1 Biography 53750
