= The OpenEnded Group =

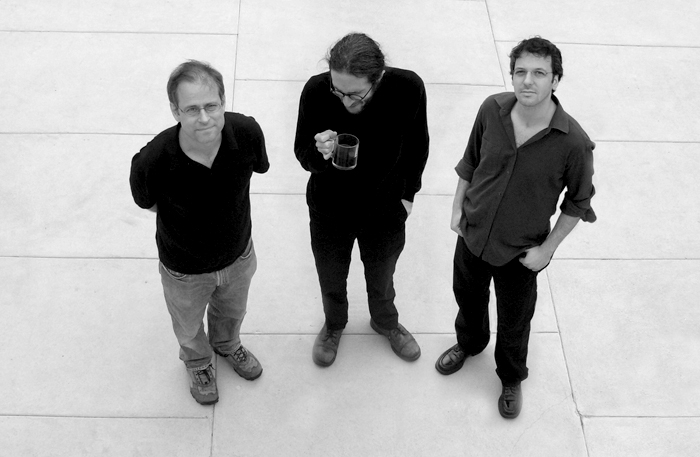
The OpenEnded Group.

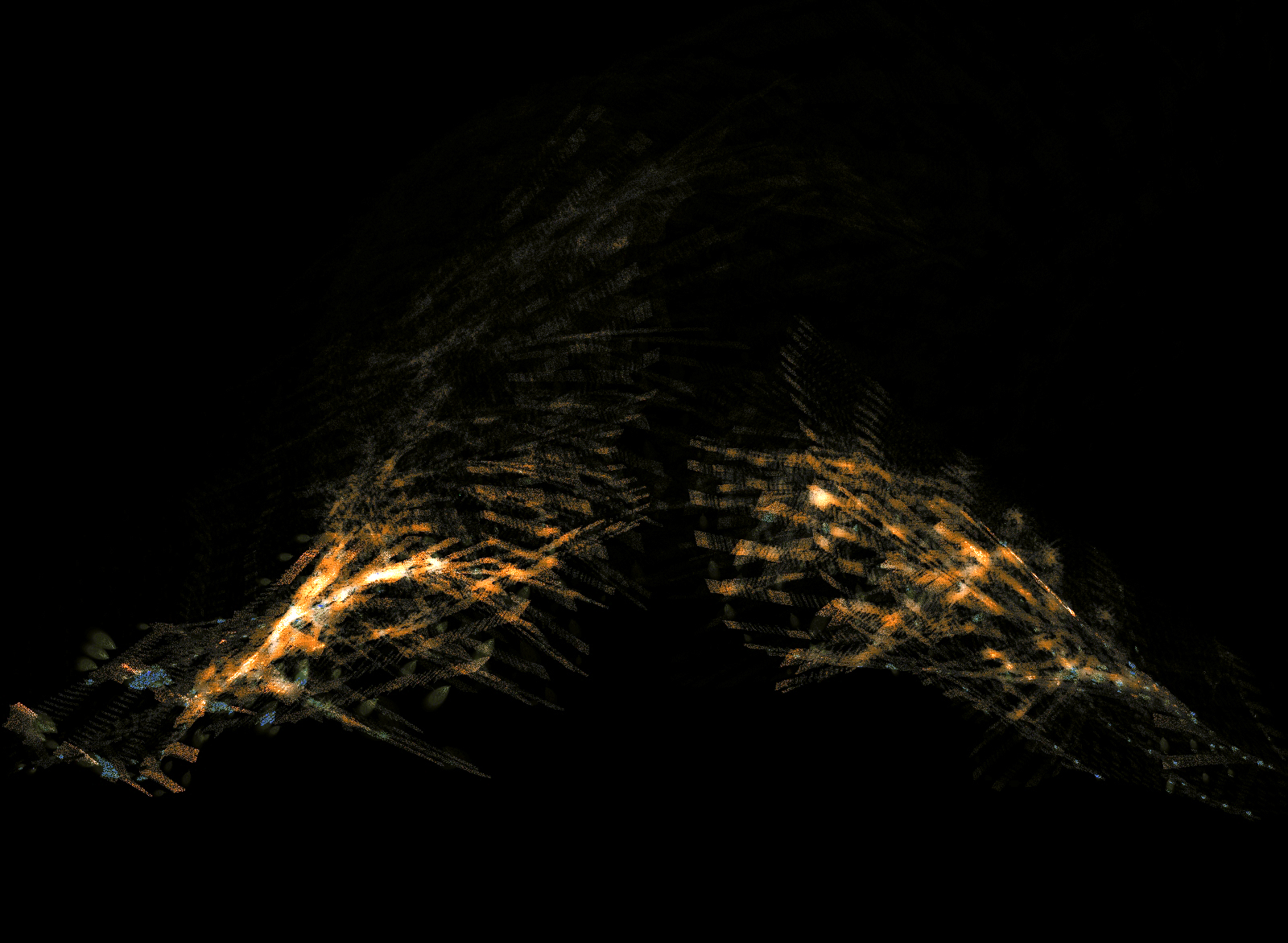
Loops (still frame).

The OpenEnded Group is a digital art collective comprising Marc Downie, Shelley Eshkar, and Paul Kaiser. They are known for their 3D visualizations, advances in dance technology (especially motion-capture), non-photorealistic rendering, and the use of artificial intelligence in art. Their work has been displayed by the Museum of the Modern Image, the Sundance Film Festival, the New York Film Festival, and the Sadler's Wells Theatre among other venues.

In dance, the OpenEnded Group has collaborated with prominent choreographers to create both installation art and stage pieces. With Merce Cunningham, they created Hand-drawn Spaces, which was fully restored in 2009 to a higher resolution (thanks to new funding) (1998), BIPED (1999), and Loops (2001–2008); with Bill T. Jones, they created Ghostcatching (1999) 22 (2005), and "After Ghostcatching" (2011); and with Trisha Brown, they created how long does the subject linger on the edge of the volume...(2005).

The OpenEnded Group has also created many large public art installations. Pedestrian (2002) projected virtual figures directly on city sidewalks. Successive commissions by the Mostly Mozart Festival of Lincoln Center placed two works outside Avery Fisher Hall: Enlightenment (2006) and Breath (2007). Recovered Light (2007) illuminated the eastern facade of the York Minster with live reconstructions of the underlying stained glass.

In 2008, The OpenEnded Group initiated the Field project, an open source integrated development environment for making digital artworks. Concurrently it released the code base for its collaboration with Merce Cunningham, Loops, as open source, with Cunningham issuing a Creative Commons license for the underlying motion-capture data of his performance.

The OpenEnded Group is supported by the National Science Foundation and the Office of Digital Humanities at the National Endowment for the Humanities.
