= Marianne Preger-Simon =

American dancer (1929–2024)

- Marianne Preger-Simon in 2019
- Born: Marianne Preger; March 6, 1929; New York City, U.S.
- Died: November 22, 2024 (aged 95); Addison, Vermont, U.S.
- Education: Cornell University; Black Mountain College; University of Massachusetts at Amherst
- Known for: Dance
- Movement: Modern dance

Marianne Preger-Simon (March 6, 1929 – November 22, 2024) was an American dancer, choreographer, writer, and psychotherapist. She was best known for her work as a founding member of the Merce Cunningham Dance Company.

== Early life and education ==
Marianne Preger was born in Brooklyn, New York, on March 6, 1929.

She attended Cornell University for two years before moving to Paris in 1948, where she attended Éducation par le Jeu Dramatique (ÉPJD—Education through Dramatic Play) founded by Jean-Louis Barrault. In 1949 she met Merce Cunningham, shortly after watching him perform at a dance concert in French painter Jean Hélion's Paris studio.

After meeting Cunningham, Preger-Simon moved to New York City to study with him one-on-one. From 1949, she was his first student.

== Merce Cunningham Dance Company ==
In the summer of 1953, Merce Cunningham taught at Black Mountain College in North Carolina. Preger-Simon was one of the seven dancers from his studio that he brought with him, supporting their stay by forgoing payment during his residency. The other students were Jo Anne Melsher, Remy Charlip, Carolyn Brown, Paul Taylor, Anita Dencks, and Viola Farber. This was the beginning of the troupe that would become the Merce Cunningham Dance Company (MCDC).

Preger-Simon danced with the company until 1958, including in the company's first two appearances at Jacob's Pillow. She performed in repertory including Dime-a-Dance, Banjo, Minutiae, Suite for Five, and Septet.

During those years, she also taught dance, drama, and world literature at the New Lincoln School in Manhattan.

In 1958, Preger-Simon retired from her career as a dancer in order to raise children. However, her close association with Merce Cunningham continued until his death in 2009.

In 2019, she released her memoir, Dancing With Merce Cunningham, which offers an intimate look at her friendship with Cunningham, the formative years and evolution of the company, and her career as a dancer. Her photographs and drawings from her time as an early dancer with the MCDC have been collected by and featured in several exhibitions at the Asheville Art Museum and Black Mountain College Museum + Arts Center.

== Later career ==
After retiring from dance, Preger-Simon received her Ed.D from the University of Massachusetts at Amherst and began a forty-year career as a psychotherapist.

== Personal life ==
Preger-Simon lived in Whately, Massachusetts. She died in November 2024, at the age of 95.

== Books ==
- Preger-Simon, Marianne; Hodes, Stuart; Macaulay, Alastair (2019). Dancing with Merce Cunningham. Gainesville: University Press of Florida. ISBN 978-0-8130-6485-7. OCLC 1050133531.
