= Calcutta Rescue =

Indian charity

Calcutta Rescue is a charity based in Kolkata, India, founded by Jack Preger and registered under the West Bengal societies act. It runs medical, educational and support services to disadvantaged people in West Bengal. It also imparts vocational training to ex-patients and underprivileged people.

== Healthcare ==
Calcutta Rescue provides completely free healthcare and health education to thousands of poorest individuals in Kolkata and around West Bengal who are suffering from a wide range of conditions and would not otherwise be able to access treatment elsewhere.

Calcutta Rescue has 4 clinics.

Tala Park Clinic Tala Park is Calcutta Rescue’s largest clinic and the heart and soul of its medical operations. Most of the patients who visit have chronic illnesses like asthma and diabetes or require expensive drug therapy for cancer, cardiac disease and HIV.The clinic also provides physiotherapy, speech therapy, counselling and support for children with disabilities along with the family.Every patient also attends a health education session covering wide range of topics each time they visit.

Nimtala Clinic Nimtala clinic is the clinic for wounded patients. Most patients with large non-healing wounds, gangrenes and abrasions come to this clinic. It has a separate wound dressing room facility for these patients. The clinic is situated in an area of great poverty, adjacent to a railway track with a slum. Most of the patients are destitute or live in tiny shacks along the adjacent railway line.

Chitpur Clinic Known as the Leprosy Clinic of Calcutta Rescue. It treats a wide range of conditions and also provides physiotherapy. In addition to free treatment for a range of diseases including tuberculosis, leprosy and diabetes, treatment is also provided for thalassaemia and malnutrition by a wide range of professional volunteers.

It also manages a clinic for people marginalised by HIV/AIDS and has established relationships with the Calcutta School of Tropical Medicine and the Medical College Hospital for referrals including counselling, diagnosis, treatment and institution-based care.The charity also runs targeted initiatives to deal with medical conditions which are often present in slum communities including treatment for scabies, worms, lice infestation and Vitamin A deficiency.

== Education ==
Aimed at slum and street children, the charity runs two education centres and one computer school for nearly 650 children covering basic literacy and numeracy and provides free meals and health screening services. It also supports children going through formal schooling by funding attendance fees, school uniforms and travel allowances.

Calcutta Rescue not only provides academic training but also emphasizes on extracurricular activities. Basic computer education is mandatory. Singing, dancing, acting, creative arts are highly valued and students are encouraged to pursue them. Sports is highly regarded. Students take part in various sports championships. Also, every student is provided with mental health care and sex education by Calcutta Rescue mental health counsellor and social worker. Additionally, they are also provided with vocational training until they are independent on their own.

== Street Medicine ==
Two street medicine ambulances roam around the slums of Kolkata, Howrah and also remote villages of far districts providing healthcare, immunisation, mother and child health treatment to the slum dwellers who are not able to visit the clinics.

== Handicrafts ==
A fair trade accredited handicrafts unit provides employment to former patients without any employment, drop-out students, domestic abuse survivors.

== Volunteers ==
Clinical and non-clinical volunteers from India and abroad share their skills and assist in skill development of the local staff.

Calcutta Rescue has established supporter groups in The Netherlands, Germany, Switzerland, United Kingdom, Norway, France, Canada and the United States.
