= Bečvář (crater) =

Lunar impact crater

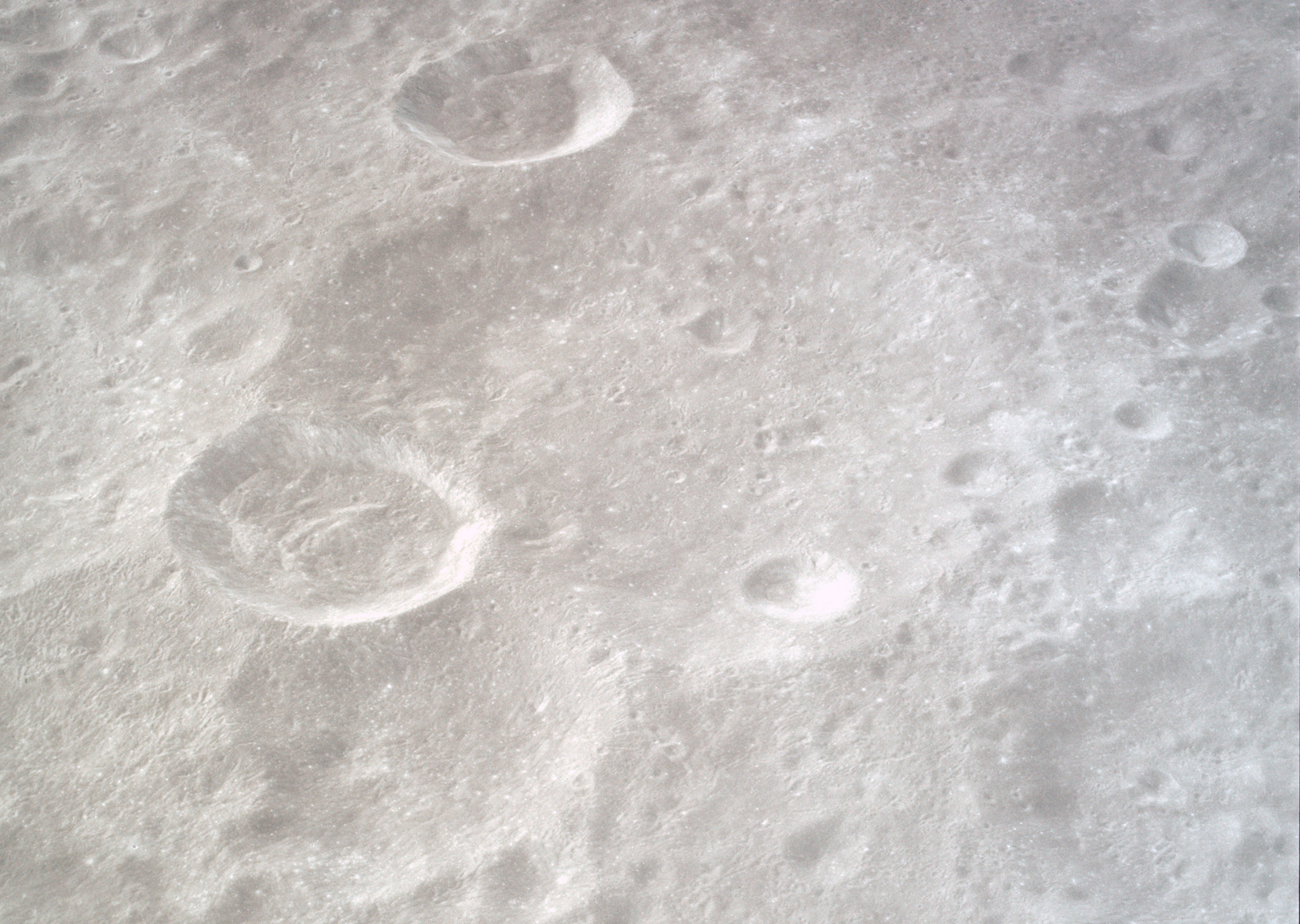
- Oblique view of Bečvář from Apollo 17, facing north. Bečvář X is at top near center, Bečvář Q is below left of center, and Bečvář J is partially visible in lower right.
- Coordinates: 2.9°S 124.5°E
- Diameter: 66.62 km (41.40 mi)
- Depth: Unknown
- Colongitude: 236° at sunrise
- Eponym: Antonín Bečvář

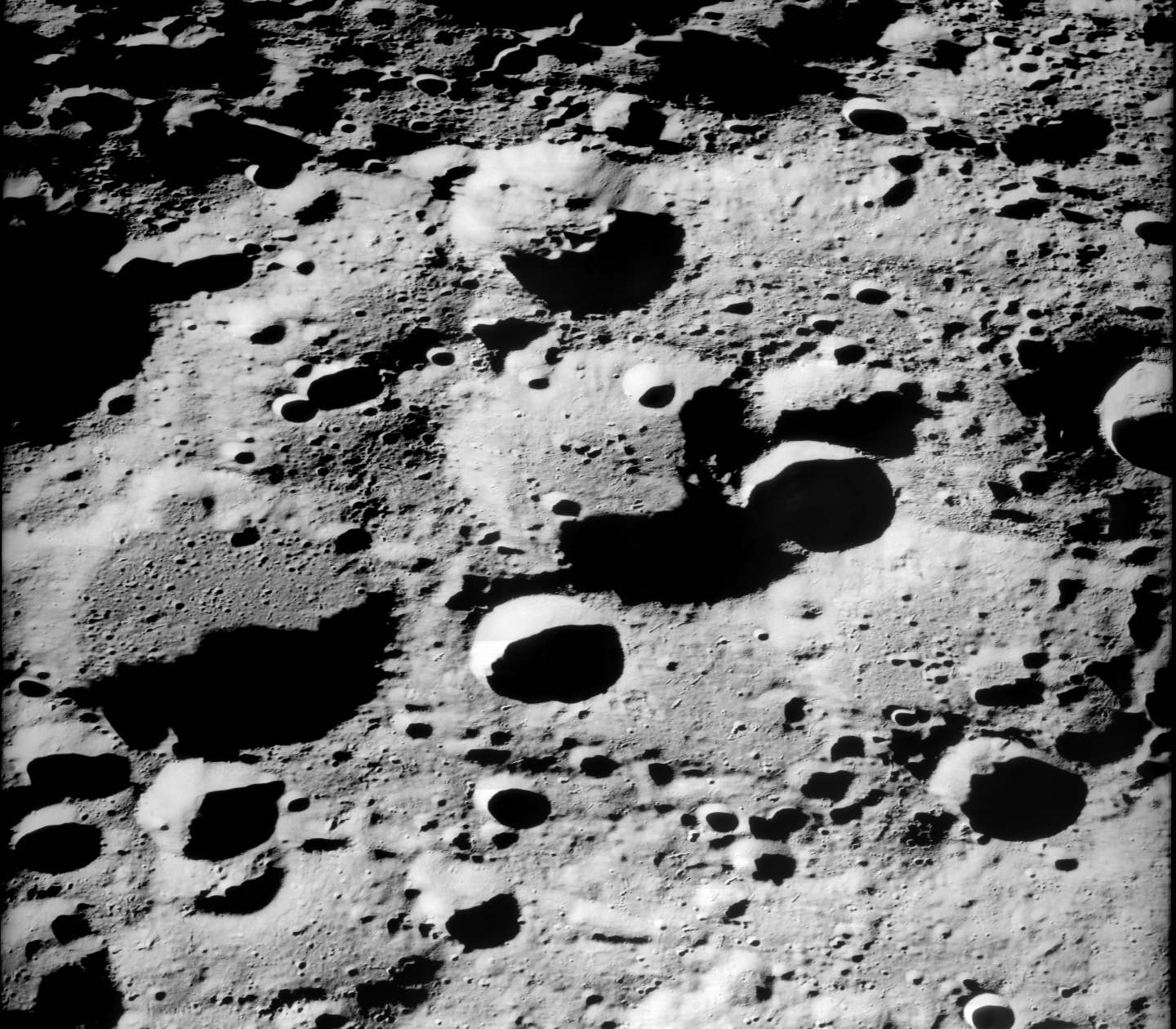
Oblique view centered on Bečvář and showing the 200-km-diameter crater spanning the image

Bečvář (Czech pronunciation: [ˈbɛtʃvaːr̝̊]) is a lunar impact crater that is located near the equator on the far side of the Moon. It lies to the northeast of the crater Necho, within that feature's ray system. To the north-northeast is the crater Gregory.

This is a worn, eroded crater system with a few tiny craterlets lying across the floor and rim. A double-crater formation occupies the southwestern rim, with Bečvář Q forming the northwestern member of this pair. The crater Bečvář X is attached to the northern rim. This crater and its surrounding ejecta are among the lowest temperature features on the Moon, corresponding to a high albedo.

The crater was named after Czechoslovak astronomer Antonín Bečvář (1001–1965). Its designation was formally adopted by the International Astronomical Union in 1970. The crater was known as Crater 283 prior to naming.

Bečvář lies at the center of an unnamed, highly subdued, 200-km-diameter crater which was originally discovered during the Apollo 16 mission and reported by Farouk El-Baz. The name Necho was proposed for the crater, but the name was eventually adopted for the small, bright-rayed crater along the south margin of the unnamed crater.

== Satellite craters ==
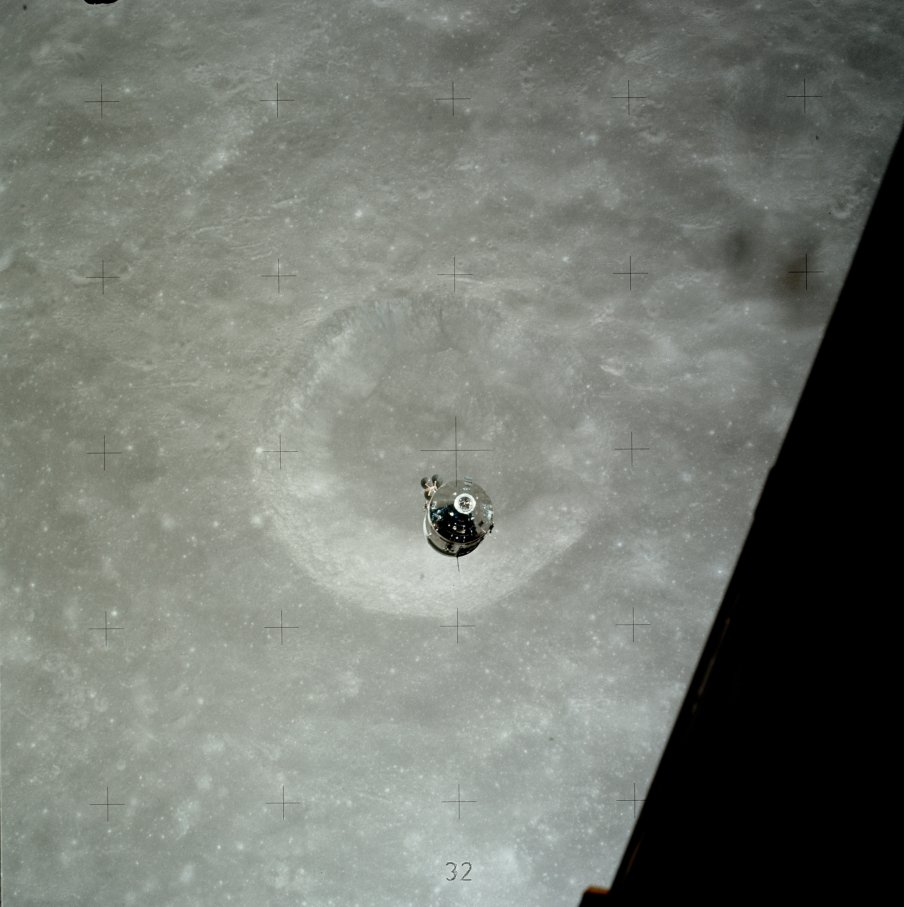
Apollo 17's CSM America above Bečvář X

By convention these features are identified on lunar maps by placing the letter on the side of the crater midpoint that is closest to Bečvář.

Bečvář	Latitude	Longitude	Diameter
D	1.5° S	126.5° E	15 km
E	2.0° S	127.8° E	15 km
J	3.6° S	126.6° E	45 km
Q	2.9° S	124.0° E	28 km
S	3.0° S	121.1° E	14 km
T	1.8° S	121.9° E	27 km
X	0.6° S	124.2° E	26 km

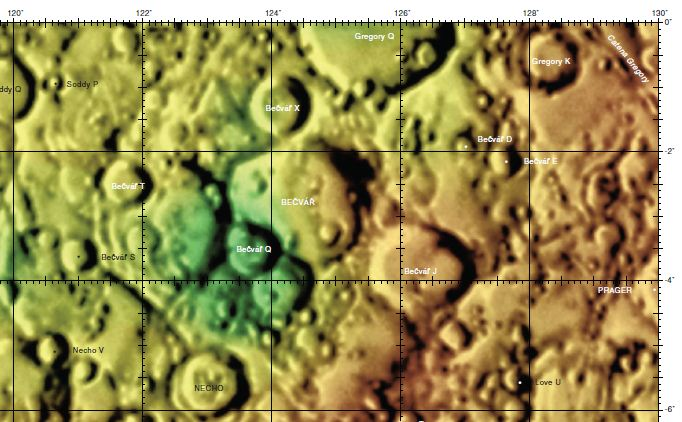
Map of the region around Bečvář
