= Moses ben Menahem =

Rabbi from Prague (17th and 18th centuries)

Moses ben Menahem (Präger) (Hebrew: משה בן מנחם) was a rabbi and kabbalist who lived in Prague in the seventeenth and eighteenth centuries.

He was a disciple of Rabbi David Oppenheim.

== Works ==
- "Wa-Yaḳhel Mosheh" (Hebrew: ויקהל משה), kabbalistic treatises on various passages of the Zohar, with a double commentary ("Masweh Mosheh" (Hebrew: מסוה משה) and "Tiḳḳune ha-Parẓufim" (Hebrew: תיקוני הפרצופים); Dessau, 1699; Zolkiev, 1741-1775);
- "Zera' Ḳodesh" (Hebrew: זרע קודש), on asceticism in a kabbalistic sense (to this is appended the story of a young man in Nikolsburg who was possessed by an evil spirit, which Moses ben Menahem drove out [Fürth, 1696 and, with this story omitted, 1712]). This story was published in Amsterdam, in 1696, in Judæo-German. Another edition of "Zera'Ḳodesh," with the "Bat Melek" (Hebrew: בת מלך) of Simeon ben David Abiob, was published in Venice in 1712.
