= Prager (crater) =

Crater on the Moon

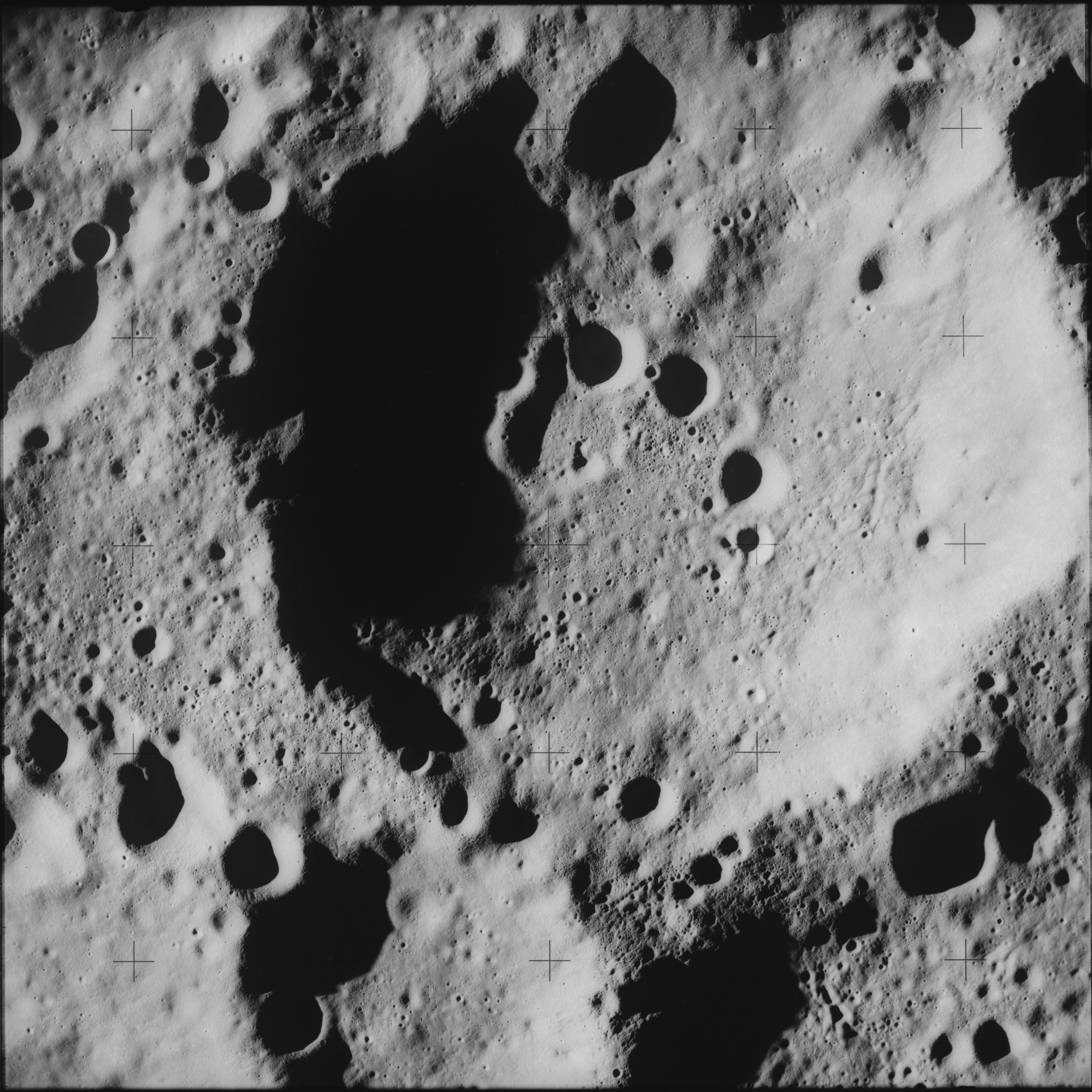
- Apollo 14 image
- Coordinates: 3.99°S 130.78°E
- Diameter: 53.9 km
- Colongitude: 230° at sunrise
- Eponym: Richard Prager

Prager is an impact crater on the Moon's far side. It is located just to the northeast of the crater Love. Farther to the south-southeast lies Lane. To the north of this crater and leading away to the northwest is a crater chain that has been designated Catena Gregory.

This is an eroded crater formation, particularly along the northern rim which is cut across by several small craters associated with the Catena Gregory. There is a worn and somewhat elongated crater attached to the southern outer rim. The remainder of the rim is pitted by small and tiny craterlets. The interior floor is also marked by several small craters, including a grouping of three near the midpoint.

The crater was named after German-American astronomer Richard Prager by the IAU in 1971. The crater was known as Crater 286 prior to naming.

== Satellite craters ==
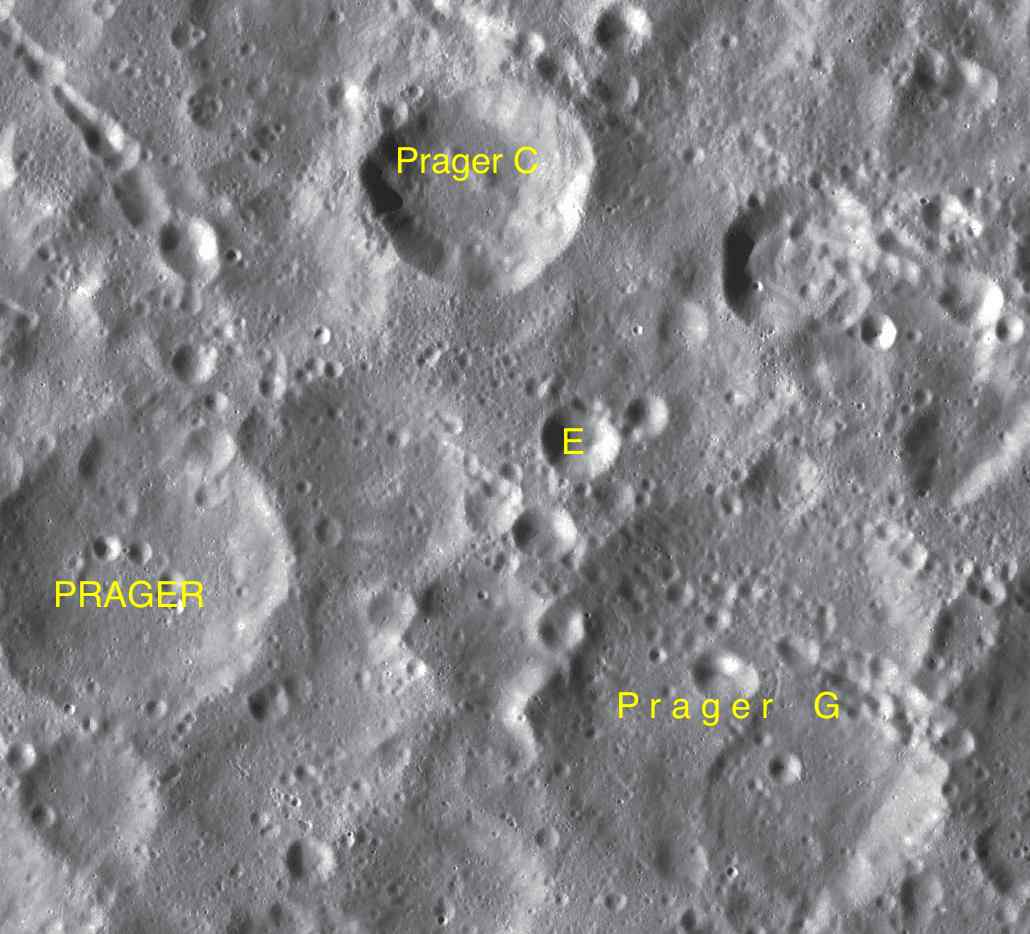
Satellite craters of Prager

By convention these features are identified on lunar maps by placing the letter on the side of the crater midpoint that is closest to Prager.

Prager	Latitude	Longitude	Diameter
C	1.4° S	132.4° E	40 km
E	3.0° S	133.1° E	14 km
G	4.6° S	134.0° E	76 km
