= Andreja Preger =

Serbian pianist (1912–2015)

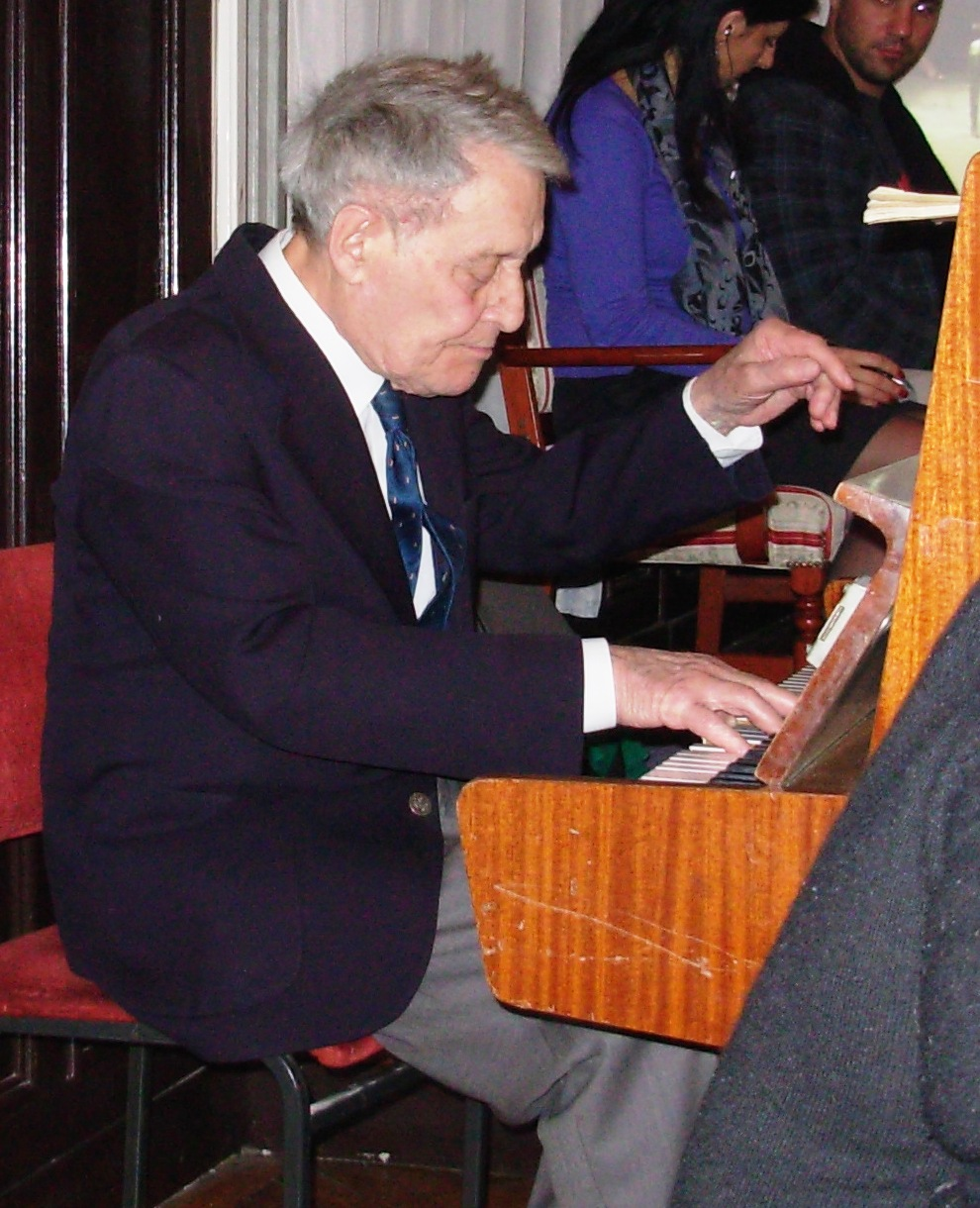
Andreja Preger

Andreja Preger (20 March 1912 – 18 December 2015) was an Austro-Hungarian-born Yugoslav and Serbian pianist and Holocaust survivor. Preger, who was Jewish, survived the Holocaust by joining the Yugoslav Partisans, led by Josip Broz Tito, during the Nazi German occupation of Yugoslavia. He became a noted concert pianist and piano teacher after the war.

== Biography ==
=== Early life ===
Andreja Preger was born in 1912 in Pécs, Austro-Hungary, in present-day Hungary. He was raised in Zagreb, present-day Croatia, where he enrolled in a Jewish school. Preger, who was a member of Hashomer Hatzair as a teenager, studied both music and law.

=== WWII ===
Preger, a reservist in the Royal Yugoslav Army, was called to active duty following the invasion of Yugoslavia by Nazi Germany in April 1941. The Kingdom of Yugoslavia surrendered to the Germans on 18 April 1941. The Independent State of Croatia, a German puppet state encompassing Preger's home city of Zagreb, was established by the Germans and the fascist Ustaše, was established on 10 April 1941. Preger, who was both Jewish and a member of the Yugoslav army, went into hiding in Zagreb. He later fled to Split, which was under Italian occupation. Preger's father and uncle were both captured and killed in the Ustaše's Jasenovac concentration camp.

Preger had been a member of the National Liberation Theatre in neighboring Bosnia-Herzegovina before the war. In 1943, he joined the Yugoslav Partisans at their headquarters in Jajce, central Bosnia. He fought against the Nazis for the rest of World War II and survived the Holocaust.

=== Later life ===
He moved to Belgrade, Yugoslavia (present-day Serbia), after the war, where he pursued music and Jewish cultural activities. He served as the long-time leader of the Federation of Jewish Communities's cultural department. He also participated in Jewish summer camps, which attracted campers from throughout the former Yugoslavia.

Preger performed throughout as a pianist throughout Europe, the former Soviet Union and the United States as a member of the Belgrade Trio, which he had established. He also taught piano at several music schools. By 2014, Preger, then 103, was the oldest member of the Serbia's Baruch Brothers Choir, one of the world's oldest Jewish choirs.

=== Death ===
Andreja Preger died in Belgrade, Serbia, on 18 December 2015, at the age of 104.
