= Jack Preger =

British doctor (1930–2026)

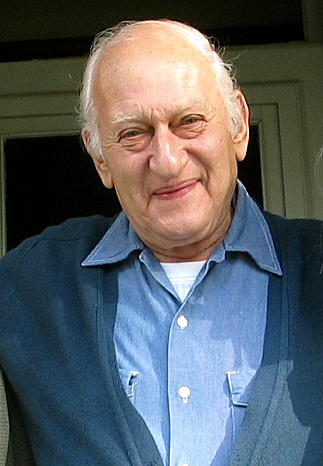
Dr. Jack Preger, founder of Calcutta Rescue

Jack Preger (25 July 1930 – 31 October 2026) was a British doctor known for offering medical treatment as well as vocational training to the poor in the Indian city of Kolkata and in other parts of West Bengal since 1972. He established the relief agency Calcutta Rescue.

Preger graduated from St Edmund Hall, Oxford with a post-graduate degree in economics and political science. He worked for a few years as a farmer in Wales before selling his farm and deciding to become a doctor instead. In 1965, he was admitted into the Royal College of Surgeons in Dublin, at the age of 35.

== Work in Bangladesh ==
In 1972, when he had just finished his internship, although his plans had been to dedicate his life to the poor in South or Central America, and he had prepared himself by learning Spanish, he answered a call over the radio for doctors to help the people of then newly independent Bangladesh. He was soon in Dhaka, where he worked, under squalid conditions, in refugee camps filled with Urdu-speaking people who intended to return to Pakistan. He learnt Urdu and later Bengali. In 1975, he set up a 90-bed clinic in Dhaka and two farms on the outskirts of the city.

However, his work in Dhaka came to an abrupt end when he discovered that Dutch non-government organisation Terre des Hommes was operating a child-smuggling racket, and exposed it despite the Bangladesh government warning him not to. He was deported to Bangkok in 1979.

== Work in Kolkata ==
After being deported from Bangladesh, he went to India the same year and worked in Kolkata for six months under Mother Teresa's Missionaries of Charity. However, Preger criticized the inadequate conditions in Mother Teresa's charities, saying "If one wants to give love, understanding and care, one uses sterile needles. This is probably the richest order in the world. Many of the dying there do not have to be dying in a strictly medical sense."

Preger thought that he would be able to do more if he operated independently, and started a clinic for the poor below the flyover connecting the Howrah Bridge. He also requested a work permit, which ultimately was not given.

When carrying medical supplies to and from the bridge proved impractical, Preger moved to Middleton Row located off Park Street where he was offered free storage facilities at a Presbytery. With medicines and equipment now at hand, he set up a clinic on the pavement flanking the Presbytery's exterior wall.

The result was a basic but structured medical facility operating illegally at the side of the road. Partially covered by tarpaulins, it comprised several departments. Preger sat in a central consultation area assisted by local doctors willing to work for a small fee. Medical records were stored here in metal boxes. Physical examinations were conducted behind held-up cloth sheets. An adjoining pharmacy section dispensed medicines. Patients were sent for diagnostic procedures, including radiology and laboratory tests. A treatment area was staffed by volunteers, including several nurses. Many of these were overland travellers who postponed their travel plans to help Preger. This section provided first aid and wound care for ulcers, burns, infections and other conditions.

A welfare department gave out vitamins and maternal supplies, plus small sums of money to cover travel costs for patients from rural areas. Serious cases, including cancer and heart disease, were referred to local hospitals for surgery, radiotherapy, or other medical procedures. The clinic was erected at daybreak and dismantled every day at dusk, leaving the sidewalk empty. Supported by donations, all treatment was provided free. Defying threats and demands from street mafia, and conflict with the authorities, Preger operated this clinic six days a week for fourteen years from 1979 to 1993, often treating several hundred patients a day. When Preger received official registration as Calcutta Rescue, he was able to set up legal, permanent clinics.

An American doctor called Jim Withers who met Preger on a trip to India in 1993, was inspired to introduce the concept in his home town of Pittsburgh, USA. Withers went on to found the Street Medicine Institute in 2009. As a result, Street Medicine programmes now operate in over 85 cities in 15 countries. Preger became known as "The Pavement Doctor of Calcutta" and today is widely regarded as the founder of street medicine.

Today, Calcutta Rescue operates three clinics, two schools and two vocational centres. It employs 150 locally hired staff and international support groups. Support groups for the work of Preger have been formed in several countries, mostly spurred on by tourists returning home, who had witnessed his selfless work : England, Switzerland, France, Germany, Norway, The Netherlands, Canada, the US.

=== Intervention by the government ===
In 1980, the Foreigners' Registration Office (FRO) of the West Bengal government noted that Preger had accepted a donation from a missionary organisation based in the United States, and demanded that he declare himself as a missionary worker, in addition to being a doctor. He resolved this only after explaining to New Delhi officials that he was not a missionary worker. (Calcutta Rescue is entirely secular), and was permitted to stay in Kolkata without a visa. In 1981, the FRO charged him with entering India without a missionary visa, but he was released on bail. The FRO dropped the charge in 1989 after intervention by the then high commissioner of New Zealand to India, Sir Edmund Hillary.

After Preger registered Calcutta Rescue as a charity in 1991, he started two more clinics in Kolkata and donations came in from eight European countries. He also obtained a resident's permit. However, the government refused to grant him the clearance needed to accept foreign donations. Preger then sued the government in Kolkata's courts. Eventually the courts struck down the government's rejection, and Preger was allowed to accept 1.5 million rupees per month in donations.

As of 1999, Preger had to apply for a re-entry visa from the FRO before he left India for any reason. Most of these applications have required legal intervention to succeed. On 23 February that year, the FRO suddenly asked Preger to leave India within seven days. The Calcutta High Court intervened by ordering the government to speedily grant him a return visa.

Aged 88 and in declining health, Preger retired in January 2019 and returned to the United Kingdom after 40 years of service to the poor in Kolkata. The work continues in his absence.

== Death ==
Preger died in Diss, Norfolk, on 31 October 2026, aged 96.

== Awards ==
In 1993, Preger was named a Member of the Order of the British Empire for his "continued perseverance and incredible selflessness".

In 2017, Preger was named "Philanthropist of the Year" by The Asian Awards at a ceremony in London, England on 5 May 2017.
