= Paul Guthnick =

German astronomer

Paul Guthnick (January 12, 1879 – September 6, 1947) was a German astronomer.

Born in Hitdorf am Rhein, he studied at the University of Bonn receiving his doctorate in 1901 under Friedrich Küstner. He worked from 1901 at the Royal Observatory of Berlin and studied variable stars and specifically Mira. As Berlin expanded, it became less possible to conduct astronomical observations there and Guthnick used, from 1906 onward, the local park known as Babelsberg. An observatory was later built there after approval by the government. He was appointed professor of astrophysics at the University of Berlin in 1916. In 1921, he became director of the Babelsberg Observatory.

He conducted observations of the stars of the Southern Hemisphere on an expedition to Windhoek in 1929. After the seizure of power by the Nazis in 1933, Guthnick adapted himself to new conditions under the regime, although he opposed the pseudoscientific "World Ice Theory" favored by Himmler.

He died in Berlin. According to his obituary in the Monthly Notices of the Royal Astronomical Society, he was a devoted Catholic.

The lunar crater Guthnick is named after him.
