= Richard Prager =

German-American astronomer

Richard A. Prager (November 30, 1883 – July 20, 1945) was a German-American astronomer.

== Career ==
Prager was born in Hannover, Germany. He became an assistant in the German Academy of Sciences in 1908. The following year he became division head of the Observatorio Nacional in Santiago, Chile, where he remained until 1913. He then returned to Berlin, becoming an observer at the Berlin-Babelsberg Observatory. In 1916 he became a professor.

He was an early pioneer of stellar photoelectric photometry. He is noted for his work in the field of variable stars, and he made numerous contributions to Astronomische Nachrichten on this topic.

In 1938 he was imprisoned by the German Nazis. His friends in England obtained his release in 1939, and he moved to the United States where he accepted a position at the Harvard Observatory. However his health had suffered from his imprisonment and from his separation from his family, and he died only six years later.

The crater Prager on the Moon is named in his honor.
