= List of lunar craters named for space explorers =

Fourteen craters on the Moon have been named after astronauts and cosmonauts who have died as part of a space mission. Most craters are on the far side of the Moon.

Four craters were named after the Apollo 1 astronauts and a Soviet cosmonaut of the Soyuz 1 mission, all four of whom died in 1967:

- Gus Grissom
- Ed White
- Roger B. Chaffee
- Vladimir Komarov

Subsequently, three craters were named after the Soyuz 11 cosmonauts, who died June 30, 1971:

- Vladislav Volkov
- Georgi Dobrovolski
- Viktor Patsayev

Since then, seven craters have been named after the Space Shuttle Challenger astronauts who died on the January 28, 1986 launch of that orbiter.

- Dick Scobee
- Gregory Jarvis
- Ronald McNair
- Ellison Onizuka
- Judith Resnik
- Michael J. Smith
- Christa McAuliffe

The astronauts of the Space Shuttle Columbia disaster are memorialized in the Columbia Hills on the planet Mars, with names expected to be approved by the IAU. Several of the internal craters in the Apollo crater have been named after the crew.

- Rick Husband
- William C. McCool
- Michael P. Anderson
- Kalpana Chawla
- David M. Brown
- Laurel Clark
- Ilan Ramon

== See also ==
- List of people with craters of the Moon named after them
