= 1789 Dobrovolsky =

Main-belt asteroid

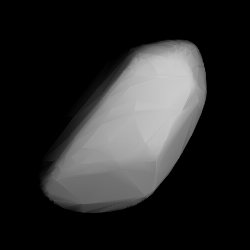
- Shape model of Dobrovolsky from its lightcurve

Discovery
- Discovered by: L. Chernykh
- Discovery site: Crimean Astrophysical Obs.
- Discovery date: 19 August 1966

Designations
- Named after: Georgy Dobrovolsky (cosmonaut)
- Alternative designations: 1966 QC · 1936 KK; 1939 GR · 1943 SG; 1946 NA · 1953 TC_{2} 1953 VX_{3} · 1955 EJ; 1956 PD · 1956 RT; 1969 OF
- Minor planet category: main-belt · Flora

Orbital characteristics
- Epoch 4 September 2017 (JD 2458000.5)
- Uncertainty parameter 0
- Observation arc: 73.51 yr (26,850 days)
- Aphelion: 2.6309 AU
- Perihelion: 1.7952 AU
- Semi-major axis: 2.2131 AU
- Eccentricity: 0.1888
- Orbital period (sidereal): 3.29 yr (1,203 days)
- Mean anomaly: 195.44°
- Mean motion: 0° 17^{m} 57.84^{s} / day
- Inclination: 1.9761°
- Longitude of ascending node: 102.09°
- Argument of perihelion: 214.93°

Physical characteristics
- Dimensions: 7.809±0.077 km 7.922±0.099; 9.85 km (calculated); 11.23±0.37 km
- Synodic rotation period: 4.800±0.020 h 4.811096±0.000005 h 4.8111±0.0025 h 4.812±0.001 h (Note: Skiff, B.A. (2011) web: rotation period 4.812±0.001 hours with a brightness amplitude of 0.13 mag. Summary figures at Collaborative Asteroid Lightcurve Link (CALL) for (1746) Brouwer); 5.8 h
- Geometric albedo: 0.1825±0.0243; 0.185±0.031; 0.24 (assumed)
- Spectral type: S
- Absolute magnitude (H): 11.05±1.53 · 11.800±0.080 (R) · 11.922±0.001 (R) · 12.2 · 13.0

1789 Dobrovolsky (prov. designation: 1966 QC) is a Flora asteroid from the inner regions of the asteroid belt, approximately 8 kilometers in diameter. It was discovered on 19 August 1966, by Russian astronomer Lyudmila Chernykh at the Crimean Astrophysical Observatory in Nauchnyj on the Crimean peninsula. The asteroid was named after cosmonaut Georgy Dobrovolsky.

== Orbit and classification ==
Dobrovolsky is a member of the Flora family, a large group of stony S-type asteroids in the inner main-belt. It orbits the Sun in the inner main-belt at a distance of 1.8–2.6 AU once every 3 years and 3 months (1,203 days). Its orbit has an eccentricity of 0.19 and an inclination of 2° with respect to the ecliptic. First identified as 1936 KK at Johannesburg, the body's first used observation was taken at Nice Observatory in 1943, when Dobrovolsky was identified as 1943 SG, extending its observation arc by 23 years prior to its official discovery observation.

== Naming ==
This minor planet was named in honor of Ukrainian–Soviet cosmonaut Georgy Dobrovolsky, commander of the Soyuz 11 spacecraft, who died on 30 June 1971 during the vehicle's return to Earth after completing the flight program of the first crewed orbital station, Salyut. The subsequently numbered minor planets 1790 Volkov and 1791 Patsayev were named in honour of his dead crew members.

The names of all three cosmonauts are also engraved on the plaque next to the sculpture of the Fallen Astronaut on the Moon, which was placed there during the Apollo 15 mission, containing the names of eight American astronauts and six Soviet cosmonauts, who had all died in service. The official naming citation was published by the Minor Planet Center on 1 July 1972 (M.P.C. 3296).

== Physical characteristics ==
=== Rotation period ===
The so-far best rated rotational lightcurve of Dobrovolsky was obtained from photometric observations by American astronomer Brian A. Skiff in March 2011. It gave a rotation period of 4.812 hours with a brightness variation of 0.13 magnitude (U=3). Other lightcurves were obtained by Claes-Ingvar Lagerkvist (in 1973) and at the Palomar Transient Factory (in 2014), giving a period of 5.8, 4.800 and 4.8111 hours, respectively (U=2/2/2). An international study from February 2016, published a modeled period of 4.811096 hours (U=n.a.).

=== Diameter and albedo ===
According to the survey carried out by NASA's Wide-field Infrared Survey Explorer with its subsequent NEOWISE mission, Dobrovolsky measures 7.92 kilometers in diameter and its surface has an albedo of 0.185 (best result), while the Collaborative Asteroid Lightcurve Link assumes an albedo of 0.24 – derived from 8 Flora, the largest member and namesake of its family – and calculates a diameter of 9.85 kilometers with an absolute magnitude of 12.2.
