= 1790 Volkov =

16 kilometre wide asteroid in the inner regions of the Asteroid Belt

Discovery
- Discovered by: L. Chernykh
- Discovery site: Crimean Astrophysical Obs.
- Discovery date: 9 March 1967

Designations
- Named after: Vladislav Volkov (cosmonaut)
- Alternative designations: 1967 ER · 1926 AB; 1950 BU_{1} · 1955 SV_{2} 1957 FB
- Minor planet category: main-belt · Flora

Orbital characteristics
- Epoch 4 September 2017 (JD 2458000.5)
- Uncertainty parameter 0
- Observation arc: 91.42 yr (33,392 days)
- Aphelion: 2.4644 AU
- Perihelion: 2.0126 AU
- Semi-major axis: 2.2385 AU
- Eccentricity: 0.1009
- Orbital period (sidereal): 3.35 yr (1,223 days)
- Mean anomaly: 45.470°
- Mean motion: 0° 17^{m} 39.48^{s} / day
- Inclination: 5.1103°
- Longitude of ascending node: 2.0099°
- Argument of perihelion: 147.74°

Physical characteristics
- Dimensions: 7.087±0.093 km 8.057±0.059 km 8.67±0.35 km 8.98 km (calculated)
- Synodic rotation period: 10.7419±0.0002 h 21.455±0.005 h
- Geometric albedo: 0.24 (assumed); 0.241±0.021; 0.2790±0.0288; 0.511±0.057
- Spectral type: S
- Absolute magnitude (H): 12.4 · 12.50

1790 Volkov, provisional designation 1967 ER, is a stony Florian asteroid from the inner regions of the asteroid belt, approximately 8 kilometers in diameter.

It was discovered on 9 March 1967, by Russian astronomer Lyudmila Chernykh at Crimean Astrophysical Observatory in Nauchnyj, on the Crimean peninsula, and named after cosmonaut Vladislav Volkov.

== Orbit and classification ==
Volkov is a stony S-type asteroid and member of the Flora family, one of the largest populations of inner main-belt asteroids. It orbits the Sun in the inner main-belt at a distance of 2.0–2.5 AU once every 3 years and 4 months (1,223 days). Its orbit has an eccentricity of 0.10 and an inclination of 5° with respect to the ecliptic. First identified as 1926 AB at Heidelberg Observatory, Volkov's observation arc is extended by 41 years prior to its official discovery observation.

== Physical characteristics ==
=== Rotation period ===
Two rotational lightcurves of Volkov were obtained from photometric observations by Robert Stephens and by French amateur astronomer Pierre Antonini in early 2007. The lightcurves gave a rotation period of 10.7419 and 21.455 hours with a brightness variation of 0.09 and 0.14 magnitude, respectively (U=3/2).

=== Diameter and albedo ===
According to the surveys carried out by the Japanese Akari satellite and NASA's Wide-field Infrared Survey Explorer with its subsequent NEOWISE mission, Volkov measures between 7.08 and 8.67 kilometers in diameter, and its surface has an albedo between 0.241 and 0.511. The Collaborative Asteroid Lightcurve Link assumes an albedo of 0.24 – derived from 8 Flora, the largest member and namesake of its family – and calculates a diameter of 8.98 kilometers with an absolute magnitude of 12.4.

== Naming ==
This minor planet was named in honor of Russian–Soviet cosmonaut Vladislav Volkov, flight engineer of the Soyuz 11 spacecraft, who died at the age of 35 during the vehicle's return to Earth after completing the flight program of the Salyut station on 30 June 1971. The lunar crater Volkov is also named after him. The minor planets 1789 Dobrovolsky and 1791 Patsayev were named in honour of his dead crew members.

The names of all three cosmonauts are also engraved on the plaque next to the sculpture of the Fallen Astronaut on the Moon, which was placed there during the Apollo 15 mission, containing the names of eight American astronauts and six Soviet cosmonauts, who had all died in service. The official naming citation was published by the Minor Planet Center on 1 July 1972 (M.P.C. 3296).
