= 1791 Patsayev =

Main-belt asteroid

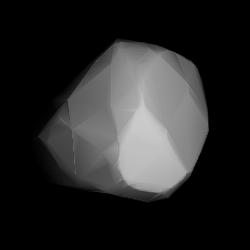
- Shape model of Patsayev from its lightcurve

Discovery
- Discovered by: T. Smirnova
- Discovery site: Crimean Astrophysical Obs.
- Discovery date: 4 September 1967

Designations
- Named after: Viktor Patsayev (cosmonaut)
- Alternative designations: 1967 RE · 1931 TW_{3} 1943 GS · 1943 GZ; 1948 JO · 1948 KA; 1957 JG · 1957 KS; 1958 RC
- Minor planet category: main-belt · (middle)

Orbital characteristics
- Epoch 4 September 2017 (JD 2458000.5)
- Uncertainty parameter 0
- Observation arc: 84.79 yr (30,970 days)
- Aphelion: 3.1351 AU
- Perihelion: 2.3603 AU
- Semi-major axis: 2.7477 AU
- Eccentricity: 0.1410
- Orbital period (sidereal): 4.55 yr (1,664 days)
- Mean anomaly: 48.980°
- Mean motion: 0° 12^{m} 59.04^{s} / day
- Inclination: 5.3689°
- Longitude of ascending node: 198.89°
- Argument of perihelion: 74.431°

Physical characteristics
- Dimensions: 25.69 km (derived); 29.394±0.114 km 29.446±0.287 km 31.50±0.37 km
- Synodic rotation period: 19.809±0.013 h
- Geometric albedo: 0.030±0.004; 0.034±0.006; 0.0390±0.0076; 0.0465 (derived)
- Spectral type: C
- Absolute magnitude (H): 11.8 · 11.9

1791 Patsayev (prov. designation: 1967 RE) is a dark background asteroid from the central region of the asteroid belt, approximately 26 kilometers in diameter. It was discovered on 4 September 1967, by Russian astronomer Tamara Smirnova at the Crimean Astrophysical Observatory in Nauchnyj, on the Crimean peninsula. The asteroid was named after cosmonaut Viktor Patsayev.

== Orbit and classification ==
The dark C-type asteroid orbits the Sun in the central main-belt at a distance of 2.4–3.1 AU once every 4 years and 7 months (1,664 days). Its orbit has an eccentricity of 0.14 and an inclination of 5° with respect to the ecliptic. Patsayev was first identified as 1931 TW_{3} at Lowell Observatory in 1931, extending the body's observation arc by 36 years prior to its official discovery observation.

== Physical characteristics ==
=== Rotation period ===
In April 2016, a rotational lightcurve of Patsayev was obtained from photometric observations taken by Sydney Black at the Oakley Southern Sky Observatory in Coonabarabran, Australia. It gave a well-defined rotation period of 19.809 hours with a brightness variation of 0.28 in magnitude (U=3).

=== Diameter and albedo ===
According to the survey carried out by NASA's Wide-field Infrared Survey Explorer with its subsequent NEOWISE mission, Patsayev measures between 29.39 and 31.50 kilometers in diameter, and its surface has a high albedo between 0.030 and 0.039. The Collaborative Asteroid Lightcurve Link (CALL) disagrees with the results found by WISE. CALL derives a much lower carbonaceous albedo of 0.046, and calculates a diameter of 25.69 kilometers with an absolute magnitude of 11.9.

== Naming ==
This minor planet was named in honor of Russian–Soviet cosmonaut Viktor Patsayev (1933–1971), test Engineer of the Soyuz 11 spacecraft, who died on his first spaceflight on 30 June 1971 during the vehicle's return to Earth after completing the flight program of the first crewed orbital station, Salyut. The lunar crater Patsaev is also named after him. The precedingly numbered minor planets 1789 Dobrovolsky and 1790 Volkov were named in honour of his dead crew members.

The names of all three cosmonauts are also engraved on the plaque next to the sculpture of the Fallen Astronaut on the Moon, which was placed there during the Apollo 15 mission, containing the names of eight American astronauts and six Soviet cosmonauts, who had all died in service. The official naming citation was published by the Minor Planet Center on 1 July 1972 (M.P.C. 3296).
