= List of spaceflight-related accidents and incidents =

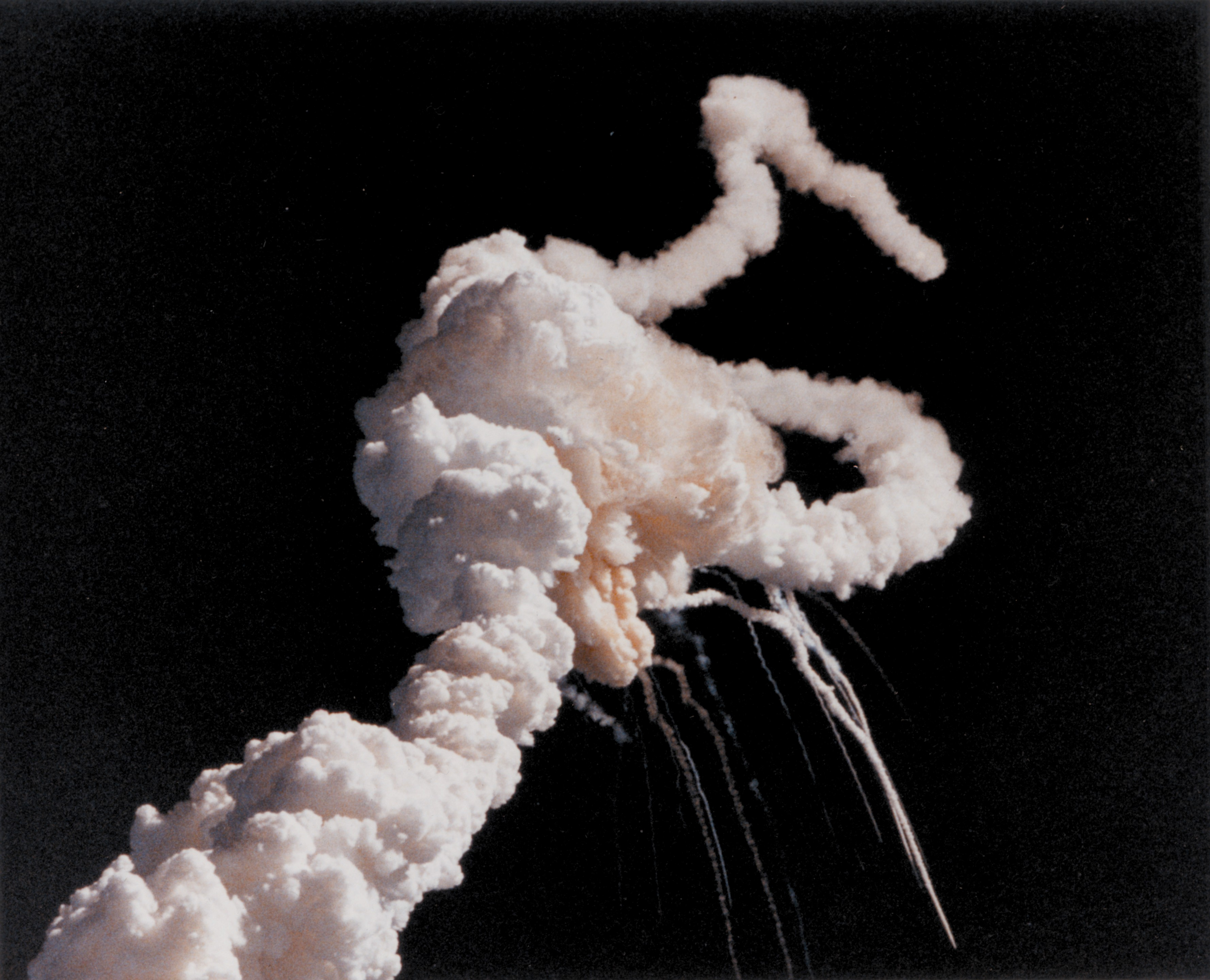
Space Shuttle Challenger breaks up during its 1986 launch resulting in the death of all seven crew members.

This article lists verifiable spaceflight-related accidents and incidents resulting in human death or serious injury. These include incidents during flight or training for crewed space missions and testing, assembly, preparation, or flight of crewed and robotic spacecraft. Not included are accidents or incidents associated with intercontinental ballistic missile (ICBM) tests, death or injury to test animals, uncrewed space flights, rocket-powered aircraft projects of World War II, or conspiracy theories about alleged unreported Soviet space accidents.

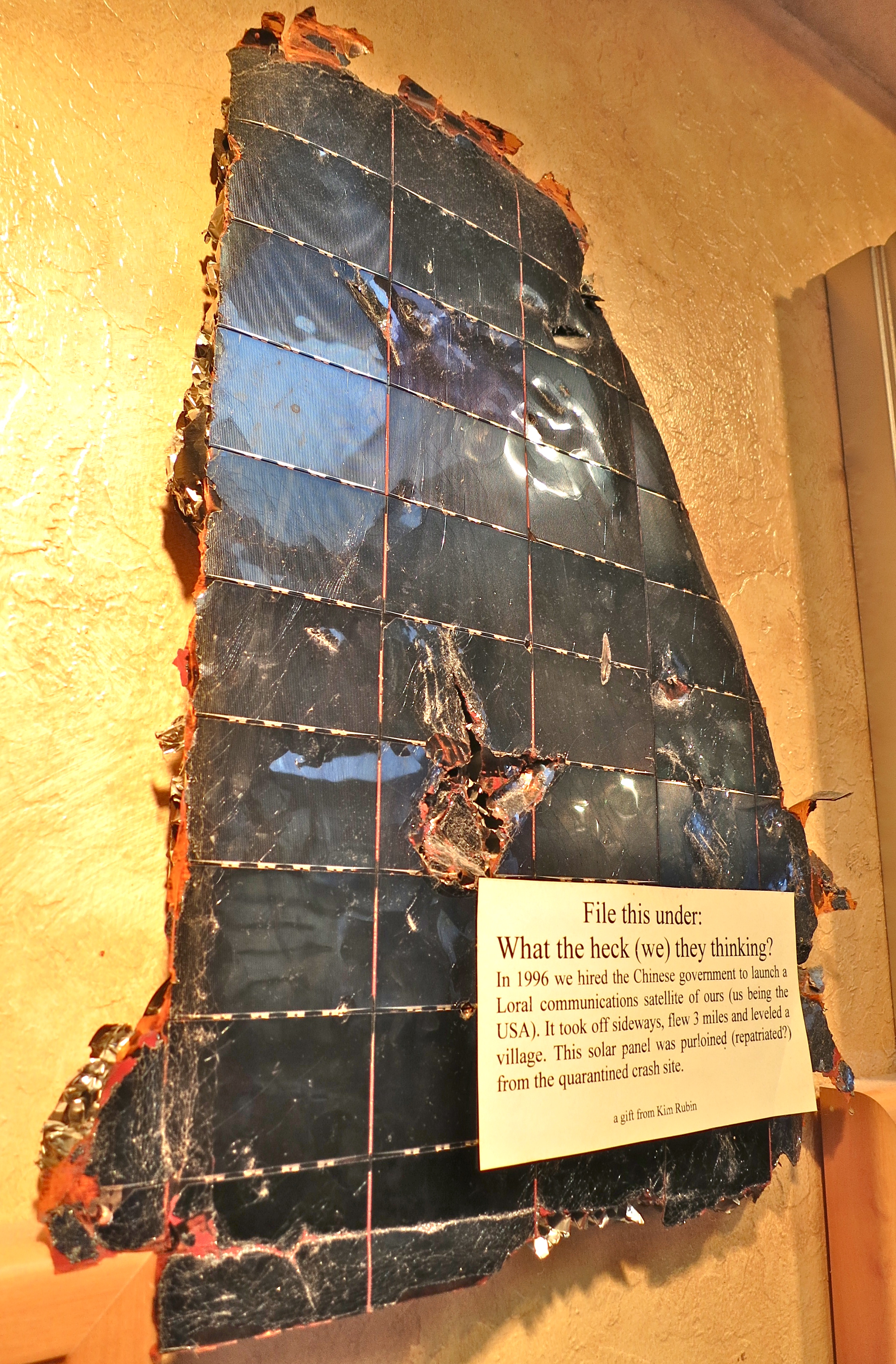
A piece of the Intelsat 708 satellite in Buck's restaurant.

As of April 2026, 19 people have died during spaceflights that crossed or were intended to cross the boundary of space as defined by the United States, that being 50 mi (80 km) above sea level. Astronauts have also died while training for space missions, such as the Apollo 1 launch pad fire that killed an entire crew of three. There have also been some non-astronaut deaths during spaceflight-related activities.

As of April 2026, more than 188 people have died in spaceflight-related incidents. In addition, astronaut Peter Siebold is the only person in human history to survive an in-flight spacecraft breakup; on 31 October 2014, Siebold survived a 15 kilometer (50,000 ft) fall without supplemental oxygen in only a thin flight suit, unbuckling from his ejection seat and deploying his parachute at 17,000 feet. From the breakup, Siebold suffered serious injuries to his eyes, face, right arm and the right side of his chest, which required multiple surgeries in the weeks following the crash. Despite his injuries, Siebold made a full recovery.

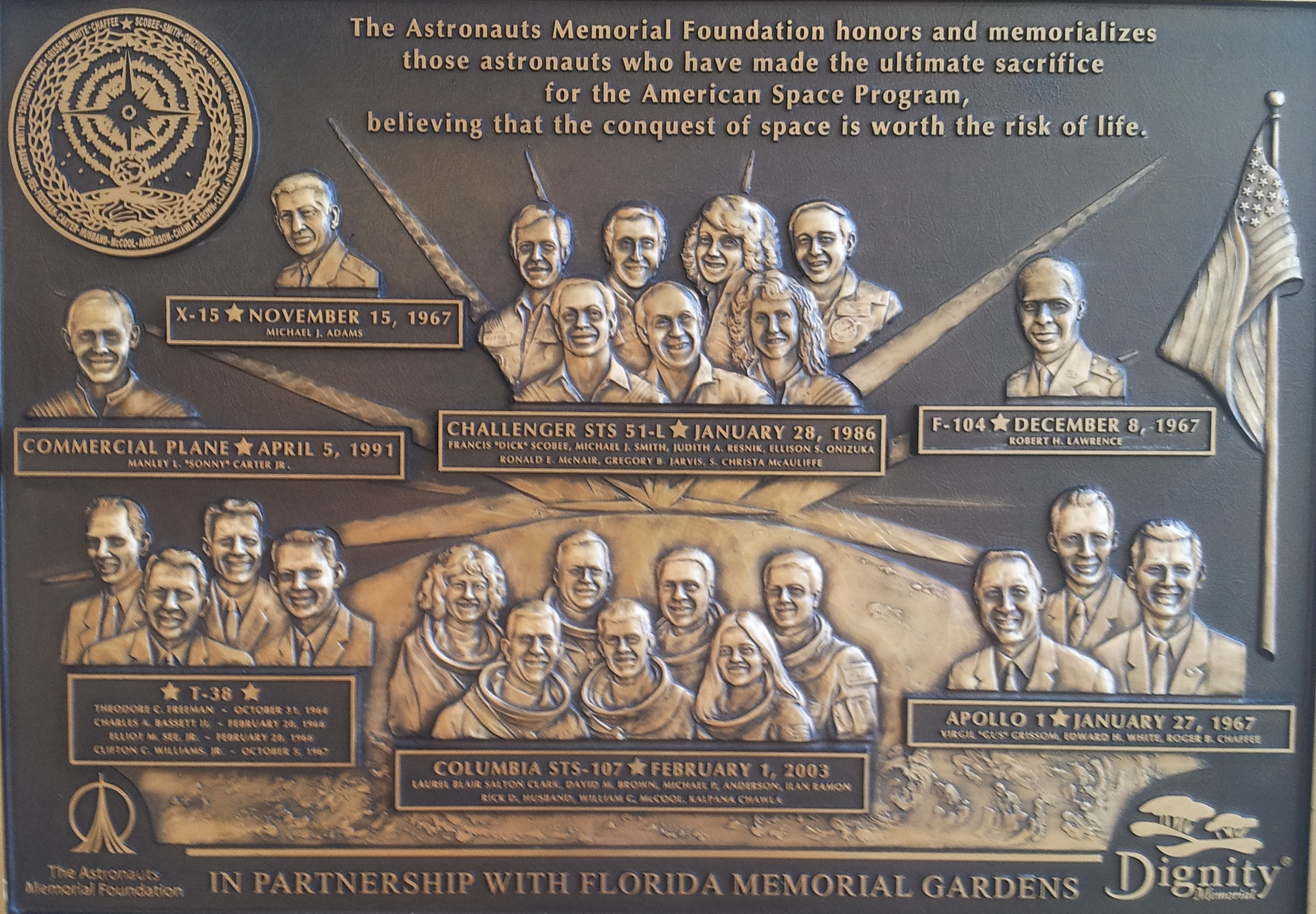
Astronauts Memorial Plaque at Cape Canaveral (2015)

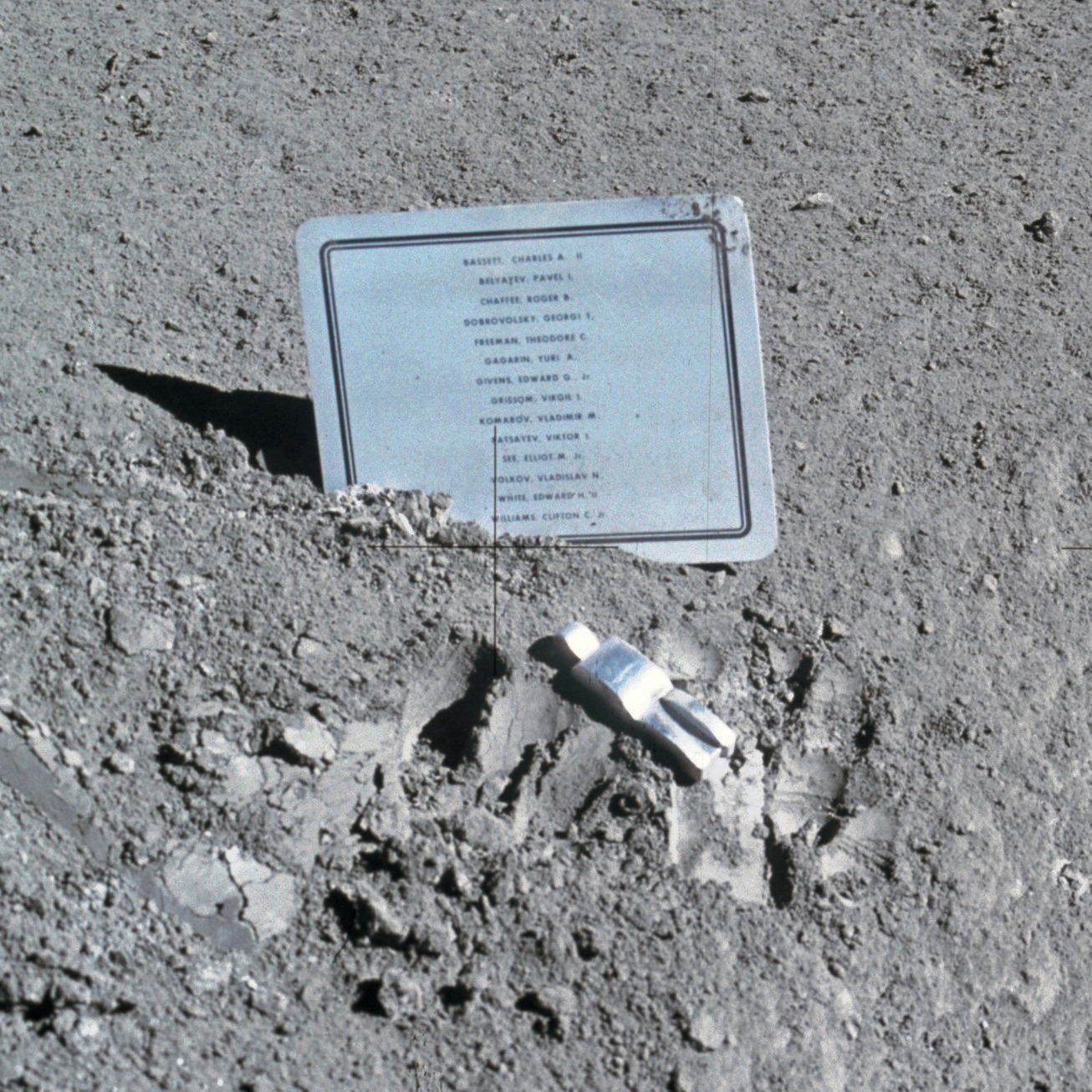
The Fallen Astronaut memorial on the Moon includes the names of most of the known astronauts and cosmonauts who were killed before 1971

== Astronaut fatalities ==
=== During spaceflight ===
As of 17 April 2026, there have been five incidents in which a spacecraft in flight suffered crew fatalities, killing a total of 15 astronauts and 4 cosmonauts. Of these, two had reached the internationally recognized edge of space (100 km or 62 mi above sea level) when or before the incident occurred, one had reached the U.S. definition of space at 266,000 ft, and one was planned to do so. In each of these accidents, the entire crew was killed. As of April 2026, a total of 791 people have flown into space and 19 of them have died in related incidents. This sets the current statistical fatality rate at 2.4 percent.

NASA astronauts who died on duty are memorialized at the Space Mirror Memorial at the Kennedy Space Center Visitor Complex in Merritt Island, Florida. Cosmonauts who died on duty under the Soviet Union were generally honored by burial at the Kremlin Wall Necropolis in Moscow. No Soviet or Russian cosmonauts have died during spaceflight since 1971.

Spaceflight fatalities above the Kármán line
Date	Incident	Mission	Fatalities
30 June 1971	Decompression in space	Soyuz 11	(Soviet Union) Georgy Dobrovolsky (Soviet Union) Viktor Patsayev (Soviet Union) Vladislav Volkov
30 June 1971	The crew of Soyuz 11 died after undocking from space station Salyut 1 after a three-week stay. A cabin vent valve construction defect caused it to open at service module separation. After the capsule landed, the recovery team found the crew dead. The Soyuz 11 landing coordinates are 47.35663°N 70.12142°E, 90 kilometers (56 mi; 49 nmi) southwest of Karazhal, Karaganda, Kazakhstan, and about 550 kilometers (340 mi; 300 nmi) northeast of Baikonur, in open flat country far from any populated area. In a small circular fenced area at the site is a memorial monument in the form of a three-sided metallic column. Near the top of the column on each side is the engraved image of the face of a crew member set into a stylized triangle. As of January 2026, these three are the only humans to die outside of Earth, as their deaths occurred about 170 kilometers (560,000 ft) above the planet, above the Kármán line which is 100 kilometers (328,084 ft) above the surface, meaning their deaths occurred in space.		

Spaceflight fatalities below the Kármán line
Date	Incident	Mission	Fatalities
24 April 1967	Parachute failure	Soyuz 1	(Soviet Union) Vladimir Komarov
24 April 1967	The one-day mission was plagued by a series of mishaps with the new spacecraft type, culminating with its parachute not opening properly after atmospheric reentry. Komarov was killed when the capsule hit the ground at high velocity. The Soyuz 1 crash site coordinates are 51.3615°N 59.5622°E, 3 kilometers (1.9 mi) west of Karabutak, Province of Orenburg in the Russian Federation, about 275 kilometers (171 mi; 148 nmi) east-southeast of Orenburg. In a small park on the side of the road is a memorial monument: a black column with a bust of Komarov at the top.		
15 November 1967	Control failure	X-15 Flight 3-65-97	(United States) Michael J. Adams
15 November 1967	During X-15 Flight 191, Adams' seventh flight, the plane had an electrical problem followed by control problems at the apogee of its flight. The pilot may also have become disoriented. During reentry from a 266,000 ft (50.4 mile, 81.1 km) apogee, the X-15 yawed and went into a spin at Mach 5. The pilot recovered, but went into a Mach 4.7 inverted dive. Excessive loading led to structural breakup at about 65,000 feet (19.8 km). Adams was posthumously awarded astronaut wings, as his flight had passed an altitude of 50 miles (80.5 km).		
28 January 1986	Launch booster failure, vehicle disintegration during launch – Space Shuttle Challenger disaster	STS-51-L	(United States) Gregory Jarvis (United States) Christa McAuliffe (United States) Ronald McNair (United States) Ellison Onizuka (United States) Judith Resnik (United States) Michael J. Smith (United States) Dick Scobee
28 January 1986	The Space Shuttle Challenger was destroyed 73 seconds after lift-off on STS-51-L at an altitude of 15 kilometers (49,000 ft). The investigation found that cold weather conditions caused an O-ring seal to fail, allowing hot gases from the shuttle's solid rocket booster (SRB) to impinge on the external propellant tank and booster strut. The strut and aft end of the tank failed, allowing the top of the SRB to rotate into the top of the tank and causing it to explode. Challenger was thrown sideways into the Mach 1.8 windstream and broke up with the loss of all seven crew members. NASA investigators determined they might have survived the spacecraft disintegration, possibly unconscious from hypoxia; some tried to activate their emergency oxygen. Any survivors of the breakup would have been killed, however, when the largely intact cockpit hit the water at 320 km/h (200 mph), about 32 km (20 miles) east of Cape Canaveral at 28.64 degrees north, 80.28 degrees west. About half of the vehicle's remains were never recovered, and fragments still washed ashore as late as a decade later on the coast of Brevard County, Florida.		
1 February 2003	Vehicle disintegration on re-entry – Space Shuttle Columbia disaster	STS-107	(United States) Rick D. Husband (United States) William C. McCool (United States) Michael P. Anderson (United States) David M. Brown (United States) Kalpana Chawla (United States) Laurel Clark (Israel) Ilan Ramon
1 February 2003	The Space Shuttle Columbia was lost as it returned from a two-week mission (STS-107) when previously detected damage to the shuttle's thermal protection system (TPS) resulted in the spacecraft breaking apart during reentry at an altitude of just under 65 km and a speed of about Mach 19. Investigation revealed that a piece of foam insulation had fallen off the external tank and hit the shuttle during launch, damaging the reinforced carbon-carbon leading edge of the left wing and allowing the extreme heat of reentry to cause structural failure. The vehicle began to break up over California and fell in fragments over eastern Texas and central Louisiana.		

=== During training or testing ===
In addition to accidents during spaceflights, 11 astronauts, test pilots, and other personnel have been killed during training or tests.

Fatalities during training or testing for spaceflight
Incident	Date	Mission (program)	Fatalities	Description
Fire in altitude chamber	23 March 1961	(Soviet Air Force Group 1)	(Soviet Union) Valentin Bondarenko	First space-related fatality. During a 15-day endurance experiment in a low-pressure altitude chamber with at least 50% oxygen atmosphere, Vostok cosmonaut trainee Bondarenko dropped an alcohol-soaked cloth onto an electric hotplate. He suffered third-degree burns over most of his body and face, and died in a hospital 16 hours later.
Training jet crash	31 October 1964	(NASA Astronaut Group 3)	(United States) Theodore Freeman	Freeman was flying a T-38 jet trainer on landing approach to Ellington AFB near Houston, Texas, when a goose struck the left side of the cockpit canopy. Shards of Plexiglas entered the engine intake and caused both engines to flame out. Freeman ejected too close to the ground for his parachute to open properly.
Training jet crash	28 February 1966	Gemini 9	(United States) Elliot See (United States) Charles Bassett	See and Bassett attempted to land their T-38 at Lambert Field in St. Louis, Missouri, in bad weather, and crashed into the adjacent McDonnell Aircraft factory, where they were going for simulator training for their Gemini 9 flight.
Fire during spacecraft test	27 January 1967	Apollo 1	(United States) Virgil "Gus" Grissom (United States) Ed White (United States) Roger B. Chaffee	An electrical fire spread quickly in the pure oxygen atmosphere of the cabin and claimed the lives of all three Apollo 1 crew members during a "plugs-out" test in preparation for their planned 21 February launch. The incident resulted in an extensive redesign of the Apollo Command Module, many changes to safety equipment and procedures, and a delay of over a year before a crewed Apollo launch.
Training jet crash	5 October 1967	(Apollo)	(United States) Clifton C. Williams	Williams, flying alone in a T-38 jet from Cape Kennedy, Florida to Houston, Texas, crashed due to an aileron control mechanical failure, about 15 miles (24 km) north of Tallahassee, Florida. Williams ejected too low for the parachute to open properly. Williams had been selected as lunar module pilot on an Apollo crew with commander Pete Conrad and command module pilot Richard Gordon.
Training jet crash	8 December 1967	(Manned Orbiting Laboratory)	(United States) Robert Henry Lawrence Jr.	The first African-American astronaut, selected for the Air Force Manned Orbiting Laboratory program, was killed when his F-104 Starfighter jet crashed at Edwards Air Force Base, California, while practicing a series of high speed, quick descent landings with Major Harvey Royer as pilot in command. Both crewmen ejected; Royer survived with injuries, but Lawrence, the instructor pilot, was found in his ejection seat, parachute not fully deployed.
Drowned during water recovery training	11 July 1993	(Soviet Air Force Cosmonaut Training Group 11)	(Russia) Sergei Vozovikov	Sergei Yuriyevich Vozovikov was a member of the Soviet Air Force Cosmonaut Training Group 11. His Cosmonaut training was from 1 October 1991 to 6 March 1992. He drowned 11 July 1993 during water recovery training in the Black Sea, near Anapa, Russia.
Spaceplane crash during test flight	31 October 2014	VSS Enterprise PF04	(United States) Michael Alsbury	Michael Alsbury was killed and Peter Siebold was seriously injured when SpaceShipTwo VSS Enterprise disintegrated during a powered atmospheric test flight over California due to premature deployment of the feathering system.

== Non-fatal incidents during spaceflight ==
Apart from actual disasters, various missions resulted in some very near misses and also some training accidents that nearly resulted in deaths.

Incident	Date	Mission	Description
Separation failure	12 April 1961	Vostok 1	After retrofire, the Vostok service module unexpectedly remained attached to the reentry module by a bundle of wires. The two halves of the craft were supposed to separate ten seconds after retrofire. But they did not separate until 10 minutes after retrofire, when the wire bundle finally burned through. The spacecraft went into wild gyrations at the beginning of reentry, before the wires burned through and the reentry module settled into the proper reentry attitude.
Landing capsule sank in water	21 July 1961	Mercury-Redstone 4	After splashdown in the Atlantic Ocean, the hatch malfunctioned and blew prematurely, filling the capsule with water and almost drowning Gus Grissom, who managed to escape before it sank. Grissom then had to deal with a spacesuit that was rapidly filling with water, but managed to get into the helicopter's retrieval collar and was lifted to safety. The spacecraft was recovered in 1999, having settled at the bottom of the Atlantic Ocean about 300 nmi (560 km; 350 mi) southeast of Cape Canaveral at a depth of about 15,000 ft (4,600 m). An unexploded SOFAR bomb, designed for sound fixing and ranging in case the craft sank, had failed and had to be dealt with when it was recovered from the ocean floor in 1999.
Space suit or airlock design fault	18 March 1965	Voskhod 2	The mission featured the world's first spacewalk, by Alexei Leonov. After his twelve minutes outside, Leonov's space suit inflated in the vacuum to the point where he could not reenter the airlock. He opened a valve to allow some of the suit's pressure to bleed off, and was barely able to get back inside the capsule after suffering side effects of the bends. Because the spacecraft was so cramped, the crew could not keep to their reentry schedule and landed 386 km (240 mi) off course in deep forest. They spent a night sheltering in the capsule from the cold, and a second night in a temporary hut built by rescuers before skiing with them to a clearing where a helicopter flew them to Perm.
Engine shutdown at launch	12 December 1965	Gemini 6A	The first on-pad shutdown in the U.S. human spaceflight program. Gemini 7 orbiting 185 miles (298 km) directly over Missile Row witnessed the event and reported they could clearly see the momentary exhaust plume before shutdown.
Equipment failure	17 March 1966	Gemini 8	A maneuvering thruster refused to shut down and put their capsule into an uncontrolled spin. After the Gemini spun up to one revolution per second, Neil Armstrong regained control by switching from the main attitude control system to the reentry system. Mission rules required a landing as soon as possible once the reentry thrusters were used, causing an early end to the flight.
Separation failure	18 January 1969	Soyuz 5	Harrowing reentry and landing when the capsule's service module initially refused to separate, causing the spacecraft to begin reentry faced the wrong way. The service module broke away before the capsule would have been destroyed, and so it made a rough but survivable landing far off course in the Ural Mountains.
Struck twice by lightning during launch	14 November 1969	Apollo 12	Two lightning strikes during launch. The first strike, at 36 seconds after liftoff, knocked the three fuel cells offline and the craft switched to battery power automatically. The second strike, at 52 seconds after liftoff, knocked the onboard guidance platform offline. Four temperature sensors on the outside of the Lunar Module were burnt out and four measuring devices in the reaction control system failed temporarily. Fuel cell power was restored about four minutes later. The astronauts spent additional time in Earth orbit to make sure the spacecraft was functional before firing their S-IVB third stage engine and departing for the Moon.
Struck by camera during splashdown	24 November 1969	Apollo 12	Astronaut Alan Bean was struck above the right eyebrow by a 16 mm movie camera when the spacecraft splashed down in the ocean. The camera broke free from its storage place. Bean suffered a concussion, and a 1.25 cm cut above the eyebrow that required stitches.
Premature engine shutdown	11 April 1970	Apollo 13	During launch, the Saturn V second stage experienced a potentially serious malfunction when the center of its five engines shut down two minutes early. The remaining engines on the second and third stages were burned a total of 34 seconds longer to compensate, and parking orbit and translunar injection were successfully achieved. It was later determined that the shutdown was caused by pogo oscillation of the engine.
Liquid oxygen tank explosion	13 April 1970	Apollo 13	The crew came home safely after a violent rupture of a liquid oxygen tank deprived the Service Module of its ability to produce electrical power, crippling their spacecraft en route to the Moon. They survived the loss of use of their command ship by relying on the Lunar Module as a "life boat" to provide life support and power for the trip home.
One of three main parachutes failed	7 August 1971	Apollo 15	During descent, the three main parachutes opened successfully. However, when the remaining reaction control system fuel was jettisoned, one parachute was damaged by the discarded fuel causing it to collapse. Spacecraft and crew still splashed down safely, at a slightly higher than normal velocity, on the two remaining main parachutes. If a second parachute had failed, the spacecraft would probably have been crushed on impact with the ocean, according to a NASA official.
Separation failure	5 April 1975	Soyuz 18a	The mission nearly ended in disaster when the rocket suffered a second-stage separation failure during launch. This also interrupted the craft's attitude, causing the vehicle to accelerate towards the Earth and triggering an emergency reentry sequence. Due to the downward acceleration, the crew experienced an acceleration of 21.3 g rather than the nominal 15 g for an abort. Upon landing, the vehicle rolled down a hill and stopped just short of a high cliff. The crew survived, but Lazarev, the mission commander, suffered internal injuries due to the severe G-forces and was never able to fly again.
Chemical poisoning	24 July 1975	Apollo–Soyuz	During final descent and parachute deployment, the U.S. crew were exposed to 300 μL/L of toxic nitrogen tetroxide (Reaction Control System oxidizer) fumes venting from the spacecraft and reentering a cabin air intake, because a switch was left in the wrong position. 400 μL/L is fatal. Vance Brand lost consciousness for a short time. The crew members suffered from burning sensations of their eyes, faces, noses, throats and lungs. Thomas Stafford quickly broke out emergency oxygen masks and put one on Brand and gave one to Deke Slayton. The crew were exposed to the toxic fumes from 24,000 ft (7.3 km) down to landing. About an hour after landing the crew developed chemical-induced pneumonia and their lungs had edema. They experienced shortness of breath and were hospitalized in Hawaii. The crew spent five days in the hospital, followed by a week of observation in semi-isolation. By 30 July, their chest X-rays appeared to return to normal except for Slayton; he was diagnosed with a benign lesion, unrelated to the gas exposure, which was later removed.
Landing capsule sank in water	16 October 1976	Soyuz 23	The capsule broke through the surface of a frozen lake and was dragged underwater by its parachute. The crew was saved after a very difficult rescue operation.
Engine malfunction	12 April 1979	Soyuz 33	Engine failure forced the mission to be aborted. It was the first failure of a Soyuz engine during orbital operations. The crew, commander Nikolai Rukavishnikov and Bulgarian cosmonaut Georgi Ivanov, suffered a steep ballistic re-entry, but were safely recovered.
SRB ignition shock wave overpressure reached design limits of orbiter structure	12 April 1981	STS-1	During launch, the Solid Rocket Booster ignition shock wave overpressure was four times greater than expected (2.0 psi or 14 kPa measured vs 0.5 psi or 3.4 kPa predicted). Some of the aft structures on Space Shuttle Columbia reached their design limits (2.0 psi) from the overpressure. The overpressure bent four struts that supported two RCS fuel tanks in the nose of Columbia and the orbiter's locked body flap was pushed up and down 6 in (15 cm) by the shock wave. John Young and Robert Crippen in the crew cabin received a 3-G jolt from the shock wave. An improved water spray shock wave damping system had to be installed on the launch pad prior to launch.
Fire in launch vehicle	26 September 1983	Soyuz T-10-1	A fuel spillage before the planned liftoff caused the vehicle to be engulfed in flames. The crew was narrowly saved by the activation of their launch escape system, with the rocket exploding two seconds later.
Leaked hydrazine fuel fire and explosion	8 December 1983	STS-9	In the last two minutes of the mission, during Space Shuttle Columbia's final approach to the Edwards AFB runway, hydrazine fuel leaked onto hot surfaces of two of the three onboard auxiliary power units (APU) in the aft compartment of the shuttle and caught fire. About 15 minutes after landing, hydrazine fuel trapped in the APU control valves exploded, destroying the valves in both APUs. The fire also damaged nearby wiring. The fire stopped when the supply of leaked fuel was exhausted. All of this was discovered the next day when technicians removed an access panel and discovered the area blackened and scorched. It is believed that hydrazine leaked in orbit and froze, stopping the leak. After returning, the leak restarted and ignited when combined with oxygen from the atmosphere. There were no injuries during the incident.
Space Shuttle in-flight engine failure	29 July 1985	STS-51-F	Five minutes and 45 seconds into ascent, one of three main engines aboard Challenger shut down prematurely due to a spurious high temperature reading. At about the same time, a second main engine almost shut down from a similar problem, but this was observed and inhibited by a fast acting flight controller. The failed SSME resulted in an Abort To Orbit (ATO) trajectory, whereby the shuttle achieves a lower than planned orbital altitude. Had the second engine failed within about 20 seconds of the first, a Transoceanic Abort Landing (TAL) abort might have been necessary. No bailout option existed until after mission STS-51-L, the Challenger disaster. But even with that option, a bailout (a "contingency abort") would never be considered when an "intact abort" option exists, and after five minutes of normal flight it would always exist unless a serious flight control failure or some other major problem beyond engine shutdown occurred.
Sensor failure	6 September 1988	Mir EP-3	At the end of the mission, Soviet cosmonaut Vladimir Lyakhov and Afghan cosmonaut Abdul Ahad Mohmand undocked from Mir in the spacecraft Soyuz TM-5. During descent they suffered a computer software problem combined with a sensor problem. The deorbit engine on the TM-5 spacecraft that was to propel them into atmospheric reentry, did not behave as expected. During an attempted burn, the computer shut off the engines prematurely, believing the spacecraft was out of alignment. Lyakhov determined that they were not, in fact, out of alignment, and asserted that the problem was caused by conflicting signals picked up by the alignment sensors caused by solar glare. With the problem apparently solved, two orbits later he restarted to deorbit engines. But the engines shut off again. The flight director decided that they would have to remain in orbit an extra day (a full revolution of the Earth), so they could determine what the problem was. During this time it was realised that during the second attempted engine burn, the computer had tried to execute the program that was used to dock with Mir several months earlier during EP-2. After reprogramming the computer, the next attempt was successful, and the crew safely landed on 7 September.
Thermal tile damage	6 December 1988	STS-27	Space Shuttle Atlantis' Thermal Protection System tiles sustained unusually severe damage during this flight. Ablative insulating material from the right-hand solid rocket booster nose cap had hit the orbiter about 85 seconds into the flight, as seen in footage of the ascent. The crew made an inspection of the Shuttle's impacted starboard side using the Shuttle's Canadarm robot arm, but the limited resolution and range of the cameras made it impossible to determine the full extent of the tile damage. Following reentry, more than 700 tiles were found to be damaged including one that was missing entirely. STS-27 was the most heavily damaged Shuttle to return to Earth safely.
Space suit puncture	8 April 1991	STS-37	During an extravehicular activity, a small stainless steel bar (palm bar) in a glove of EV2 astronaut Jay Apt's extravehicular mobility unit punctured the suit. The suit's pressure bladder and thin comfort glove conformed to the puncture and sealed it, preventing any detectable depressurization. Apt was unaware of the failure during the EVA, learning of it only when the suit manager phoned him the evening after he returned to Houston. During post-flight debriefings, Apt said after the second EVA, when he removed the gloves, his right hand had an abrasion behind the knuckle of the index finger. A postflight inspection of the right hand glove found the palm bar of the glove penetrating a restraint and glove bladder into the index finger side of the glove. NASA found air leakage with the bar in place was 3.8 SCCM, well within the specification of 8.0 SCCM. They said if the bar had come out of the hole, the leak still would not have been great enough to activate the secondary oxygen pack. The suit would, however, have shown a high oxygen rate indication.
Explosive release device punctured cargo bay bulkhead	12 September 1993	STS-51	While releasing the Advanced Communications Technology Satellite from the payload bay, both the primary and backup explosive release devices detonated. Only the primary device was supposed to have detonated. Large metal bands holding the satellite in place were ripped away, causing flying debris. The debris punctured the orbiter's payload bay bulkhead leading to the main engine compartment, damaging wiring trays and payload bay thermal insulation blankets. The puncture in the bulkhead was 3 mm by 13 mm in size. The crew was uninjured and the damage was not great enough to endanger the shuttle. The satellite was undamaged.
Collision in space	27 August 1994	Mir	At Mir, during the 2nd docking attempt the Progress M-24 cargo freighter, the Progress freighter collided with the space station causing minor damage to the space station that was crewed at that time.
Eye injury from Mir exercise equipment	18 May 1995	Mir	While exercising on the EO-18/NASA 1/Soyuz TM-21 mission, astronaut Norman E. Thagard suffered an eye injury. He was using an exercise device, doing deep knee bends, with elastic straps. One of the straps slipped off of his foot, flew up, and hit him in the eye. Later, even a small amount of light caused pain in his eye. He said using the eye was, "like looking at the world through gauze." An ophthalmologist at Mission Control-Moscow prescribed steroid drops and the eye healed.
Fire on board	23 February 1997	Mir	There was a fire on board the Mir space station when a lithium perchlorate canister used to generate oxygen leaked. The fire was extinguished after about 90 seconds, but smoke did not clear for several minutes.
Fuel cell failure	8 April 1997	STS-83	Fuel cell #2 aboard Space Shuttle Columbia unexpectedly failed on Day 4 in orbit, forcing an early end to the flight. The mission touched down safely, and the crew was reflown with the same mission plan on STS-94.
Collision in space	25 June 1997	Mir	At Mir, during a re-docking test with the Progress M-34 cargo freighter, the Progress freighter collided with the Spektr module and solar arrays of the Mir space station. This damaged the solar arrays and the collision punctured a hole in the Spektr module and the space station began depressurizing. The onboard crew of two Russians and one visiting NASA astronaut were able to close off the Spektr module from the rest of Mir after quickly cutting cables and hoses blocking the hatch closure.
Main engine electrical short and hydrogen leak	23 July 1999	STS-93	Five seconds after liftoff, an electrical short knocked out controllers for two shuttle main engines. The engines automatically switched to their backup controllers. Had a further short shut down two engines, Columbia would have ditched in the ocean, although the crew could have possibly bailed out. Concurrently a pin came loose inside one engine and ruptured a cooling line, allowing a hydrogen fuel leak. This caused premature fuel exhaustion, but the vehicle safely achieved a slightly lower orbit. Had the failure propagated further, a risky transatlantic or RTLS abort would have been required.
Toxic ammonia leak during EVA	10 February 2001	ISS/STS-98	During EVA 1 on the mission, NASA astronauts Robert L. Curbeam and Thomas D. Jones were connecting cooling lines on the International Space Station while working to install the Destiny laboratory module. A defective quick-disconnect valve allowed 5% of the ammonia cooling supply to escape into space. The escaping ammonia froze on the spacesuit of astronaut Curbeam as he struggled to close the valve. His helmet and suit were coated in ammonia crystals an inch thick. Mission Control instructed Curbeam to remain outside for an entire orbit to allow the Sun to evaporate the frozen ammonia from his spacesuit. When they returned to the airlock, the astronauts pressurized, vented and then repressurized the air lock to purge any remaining toxic ammonia. After they removed their spacesuits, the crew wore oxygen masks for another 20 minutes to allow life-support systems in the airlock to further filter the air. No injuries resulted from the incident.
Ballistic reentry, injured shoulder	3 May 2003	Soyuz TMA-1	The capsule had a malfunction during its return to Earth from the ISS Expedition 6 mission and performed a ballistic reentry. The crew was subjected to about 8 to 9 Gs during reentry. The capsule landed 500 kilometres (310 mi; 270 nmi) from the intended landing target. In addition, after landing the capsule was dragged about 15 metres (49 ft) by its parachute and ended up on its side in a hard landing. Astronaut Don Pettit injured his shoulder and was placed on a stretcher in a rescue helicopter and did not take part in post-landing ceremonies.
Unplanned rolls during ascent	29 September 2004	SpaceShipOne-16P	On suborbital flight 16P, the first of two flights that won the X-Prize for exceeding 100 km (62 mi) in altitude, astronaut Mike Melvill experienced 29 unplanned rolls during and after powered ascent. The rolls began at 50 seconds into the engine burn. The burn was stopped 11 seconds early after burning a total of 76 seconds. After engine cutoff, the craft continued rolling while coasting to apogee. The roll was finally brought under control after apogee using the craft's reaction jets. SpaceShipOne landed safely and Mike Melvill was uninjured.
Separation failure	19 April 2008	Soyuz TMA-11	Reentry mishap similar to that suffered by Soyuz 5 in 1969. The service module failed to completely separate from the reentry vehicle and caused it to face the wrong way during the early portion of aerobraking. As with Soyuz 5, the service module eventually separated and the reentry vehicle completed a rough but survivable landing. Following the Russian news agency Interfax's report, this was widely reported as life-threatening while NASA urged caution pending an investigation of the vehicle. South Korean astronaut Yi So-yeon was hospitalized after her return to South Korea due to injuries caused by the rough return voyage in the Soyuz TMA-11 spacecraft. The South Korean Science Ministry said that the astronaut had a minor injury to her neck muscles and had bruised her spinal column.
Aborted spacewalk after water leak in suit	16 July 2013	ISS Expedition 36	During EVA-23, European Space Agency astronaut Luca Parmitano reported that water was steadily leaking into his helmet. Flight controllers elected to abort the EVA immediately, and Parmitano made his way back to the Quest airlock, followed by fellow astronaut Chris Cassidy. The airlock began repressurizing after a 1-hour and 32 minute spacewalk, and by this time Parmitano was having difficulty seeing, hearing, and speaking due to the amount of water in his suit. After repressurization, Expedition 36 commander Pavel Vinogradov and crewmembers Fyodor Yurchikhin and Karen Nyberg quickly removed Parmitano's helmet and soaked up the water with towels. Despite the incident, Parmitano was reported to be in good spirits and suffered no injury. By December 2013, NASA had determined the leak to have been caused by a design flaw in the Portable Life Support System liquid coolant. The designers failed to take into account the physics of water in zero-g, which unintentionally allowed coolant water to mix with the air supply.
Hole detected in spacecraft	30 August 2018	Soyuz MS-09	Ground controllers detected a dip in cabin pressure, which astronauts traced to a 2-millimeter hole in Soyuz MS-09, which was quickly patched up by Soyuz commander Sergey Prokopyev with epoxy.
Launch booster failure, ballistic re-entry	11 October 2018	Soyuz MS-10	The crew reported feeling weightless; mission control declared a rocket had failed. An emergency was declared and the spacecraft carrying the crew was separated from the rocket. It returned to Earth in a ballistic descent (sharper than normal angle), and the crew experienced 6.7 G during the landing. The crew did not need immediate medical care when recovered. Investigation determined the ball joint supporting one of the side boosters had been deformed during assembly; the damaged joint prevented proper separation despite proper activation of the separation motors; the booster re-contacted the core stage, inflicting further damage.
Air leak in space station	August 2020	Expedition 63	NASA reported an air leak from the International Space Station during Expedition 63. The source of the leak was traced to the Zvezda module, but its exact location was unknown.
Uncontrolled spin of Space Station	29 July 2021	Expedition 65	NASA reported an uncontrolled spin event after docking of the Russian Nauka module that replaced Pirs. It appears that the module's onboard computers incorrectly determined that it was still in open space rather than docked and fired its thrusters. Controllers had to fire the thrusters on Progress to counteract the (270 degree) spin and bring the station back into its correct orientation complicated by the module being out of range of Russian ground control stations, eventually however its propellant depleted and the situation was resolved.
Coolant Leak	December 2022 – January 2023	Expedition 68 Soyuz MS-22	On December 14, 2022, Cosmonauts Dmitry Petelin and Sergey Prokopyev were preparing for a spacewalk when a leak was detected on the Soyuz MS-22 spacecraft. After inspection by Canadarm2 and the European Robotic Arm, NASA announced on December 19, 2022, "A small hole was observed, and the surface of the radiator around the hole showed discoloration". Roscosmos said that there was a hole about 0.8 millimetres in diameter that caused the temperatures in MS-22 to go above 30 degrees Celsius. The cause of the hole and leak is under investigation however Roscosmos suspects micrometeoroids to be a potential cause. In January 2023 it was decided by NASA and Roscosmos to replace MS-22 with Soyuz MS-23. As an interim measure in case of an emergency evacuation is required, the seat of NASA Astronaut Frank Rubio will be moved to Crew Dragon Endurance with SpaceX Crew-5 while Prokopyev and Petelin would return to earth on MS-22. Once MS-23 arrives, the seats of Prokopyev, Petelin and Rubio would be moved to MS-23. As well, Sergei Krikalev of Roscosmos stated that the crew of MS-22 would have their mission extended by "at least, several more months" to allow the preparation of Soyuz MS-24.
Spacecraft attitude control compromised	June 2024	Boeing Crew Flight Test	Third flight of Starliner and the first one to carry crew, intended to dock with the ISS for about one week. As the spacecraft was approaching the ISS, multiple thrusters malfunctioned, resulting in the loss of six degrees of freedom control. While the spacecraft still managed to dock with the ISS, NASA concluded that it was too unsafe to return its crew. The capsule returned uncrewed in September while the crew returned on a Dragon capsule in March 2025.
Spacecraft struck by space debris	November 2025	Shenzhou 20	China Manned Space Agency (CMSA) reported a suspected strike on the Shenzhou 20 by “tiny space debris” has delayed the return of the Chinese spaceship Shenzhou-20 and three taikonauts Chen Dong, Chen Zhongrui and Wang Jie originally scheduled for November 5, 2025 from the Tiangong Space Station.
Launchpad service tower collapsed during launch	27 November 2025	Soyuz MS-28	Roscosmos reported that the launch pad at Site 31 was damaged during the launch, with the mobile service platform beneath the pad appearing to have collapsed into the flame trench. The extent of the damage temporarily rendered Russia's only operational crewed launch facility unusable. The status of the next planned launch from the site, the Progress MS-33 cargo mission scheduled for late December, was not immediately clear. In the hours following the incident, Roscosmos issued a statement saying it was assessing the situation, had the necessary spare parts, and expected repairs to be completed soon. After repairs were completed, Progress MS-33 launched on 22 March 2026.

== Non-fatal training accidents ==
Spaceflight-related accidents and incidents during assembly, testing, and preparation for flight of crewed and uncrewed spacecraft have occasionally resulted in injuries or the loss of craft since the earliest days of space programs. 35 accidents since 2009.

== Non-astronaut fatalities ==
=== Fatalities caused by rocket explosions ===
This list excludes deaths caused by military operations, either by deliberate detonations, or accidental during production – for example German V-2 rockets reportedly caused on average an estimated 6 deaths per operational rocket just during its production stages.

Date	Place	Dead	Rocket	Description
17 May 1930	Berlin, Weimar Germany	1		Max Valier, "first casualty of the modern space age", killed by rocket engine explosion.
2 February 1931	Mount Redoria near Milan, Italy	1		A liquid fueled, 132-pound (60 kg) meteorological rocket, that was constructed by American physicist, Dr. Darwin Lyon, exploded during tests, killing a mechanic and injuring three others. Dr. Lyon was not present when the explosion occurred.
10 October 1933	Nazi Germany	3		Explosion in rocket manufacturing room of Reinhold Tiling.
16 July 1934	Kummersdorf, Germany	3	A1	Research project under the supervision of Walter Dornberger killed Kurt Wahmke and two assistants as part of the Aggregat rocket development, during a fuel test of a premixed hydrogen peroxide/alcohol propellant when the fuel tank exploded.
24 October 1960	Baikonur Cosmodrome, USSR	54–300	R-16	Nedelin catastrophe: A launch pad explosion of an unmanned rocket killed Soviet Air Force official Marshal Mitrofan Nedelin, and a disputed number of other personnel.
24 October 1963	Baikonur Cosmodrome, USSR	7	R-9 Desna	An R-9 missile was being prepared for launch in a silo from Site 70 at Baikonur Cosmodrome. The 11-man launch crew did not realize that an oxygen leak from the missile's fuel system had raised the partial oxygen pressure to 32% (the maximum allowed was 21%). The crew was descending to the eighth level in a lift when a spark from an electrical panel started a fire in the nearly pure oxygen atmosphere, killing seven and destroying the silo.
14 April 1964	Cape Canaveral, US	3	Delta rocket	The third stage of a Delta rocket had just been joined to the Orbiting Solar Observatory satellite in the spin test facility building at Cape Kennedy. Eleven workers were in the room when the 205 kg (452 lb) of solid fuel in the third stage ignited. Sidney Dagle, 29; Lot D. Gabel, 51, and John Fassett, 30, were severely burned and later died of their injuries. Eight others were injured, but survived. The ignition was caused by a spark of static electricity.
7 May 1964	Braunlage, West Germany	3	Mail rocket	Mail rocket built by Gerhard Zucker exploded and debris hit crowd of spectators.
14 December 1966	Baikonur Cosmodrome, USSR	1	Soyuz 7K-OK	Soyuz 7K-OK No.1: Second uncrewed Soyuz test flight. Launch escape system fired 27 minutes after an aborted launch causing a fire and subsequent explosion when pad workers had already returned to the launch pad.
14 July 1968	Baikonur Cosmodrome, USSR	1	Soyuz 7K-L1 launch vehicle	Soyuz 7K-L1 No. 8L: An oxygen tank in the Blok D stage exploded while the rocket was being prepared for launch. Captain Ivan Khridin is gravely injured by flying debris and later dies. It was found that stray electric current in the defective cabling network triggered a false command to pressurize the oxygen tank until it eventually ruptured. Despite the explosion, both the rocket and spacecraft only suffered minor damage.
26 June 1973	Plesetsk Cosmodrome, USSR	9	Kosmos-3M launch vehicle	Launch explosion of Kosmos-3M rocket
18 March 1980	Plesetsk Cosmodrome, USSR	48	Vostok-2M launch vehicle	1980 Plesetsk launch pad disaster: A Vostok-2M rocket carrying a Tselina-D satellite exploded during fueling due to lead solder in fuel filter reacting with hydrogen peroxide, killing 44 people in the initial fire, and 4 more in the hospital from burns.
7 September 1990	Edwards AFB, US	1	Titan IV	A Titan IV launch vehicle solid rocket booster was being hoisted by a crane into a rocket test stand at Edwards AFB, California. The bottom section of the booster broke free, hit the ground and ignited. One person, Alan M. Quimby, 27, a civilian employee of Wyle Laboratories, was killed and nine others were injured in the accident.
9 August 1991	Komaki, Aichi, Japan	1	H-II launch vehicle	Engineer Arihiro Kanaya, 23, was conducting a high pressure endurance test on a pipe used in the first stage rocket engine of the H-2 (H-II) launch vehicle when it exploded. The explosion caused a 14 cm (5.5 in) thick door in the testing room to fall on Kanaya and fracture his skull, killing him. The accident happened at the Nagoya Guidance and Propulsion Systems Works Of Mitsubishi Heavy Industries in Komaki, Aichi, Japan.
27 February 1993	Esrange, Sweden	1	Nike-Orion	Bror Thornéus, a technician from Sweden was killed when a sounding rocket ignited during testing of its ignition system at the European Sounding Rocket Range (Esrange), in northern Sweden.
26 January 1995	Xichang, China	6+	Long March 2E	Long March 2E Rocket with the Apstar 2 satellite veered off course after launch and exploded in the air, 6 people perished from fallen debris. Payload collapsed mid-air due to structural deficiency.
15 February 1996	Xichang, China	6–100	Long March 3B	A Long March rocket carrying the Intelsat 708 Satellite veered off course immediately after launch, crashing in the nearby village 22 seconds later, destroying 80 houses. According to official Chinese reports there were 6 fatalities and 57 injuries resulting from the incident, but a US source estimated 100 fatalities.
15 October 2002	Plesetsk Cosmodrome, Russia	1	Soyuz-U	Foton-M No.1, aboard a Soyuz-U, exploded 29 seconds after launch, killing a soldier, Ivan Marchenko, and injuring 8 others. Fragments of the rocket started a forest fire nearby, and a Blok D strap-on booster caused damage to the launchpad.
22 August 2003	Alcântara Launch Center, Brazil	21	VLS-1	VLS-1 V03: Explosion of an uncrewed rocket during launch preparations.
26 July 2007	Mojave Spaceport, California	3	engine test for SpaceShipTwo	Explosion during a test of rocket systems by Scaled Composites during a nitrous oxide injector test.

=== Other non-astronaut fatalities ===
48 fatalities.

Incident date	Place	Dead	Associated mission/vehicle	Description
16 May 1968	Kennedy Space Center, US	1		Pad worker William B. Estes, 46, was killed while hooking up an 8-inch (20 cm) high-pressure water line, which should not have been pressurized at the time, to the mobile Service structure on Kennedy Space Center Launch Complex 39A. The cap blew off with 180 psi pressure, striking him in the chest and killing him.
2 March 1978	Florida, US	1		Robert E. "Champ" Murphy was injured in an incident involving a Halon cylinder. He lost his foot and died on 8 June 1985 as a result of Halon exposure.
19 March 1981	Kennedy Space Center, US	3	STS-1	Anoxia due to nitrogen atmosphere in the aft engine compartment of Columbia during a countdown demonstration test for STS-1. Five workers were involved in the incident. John Bjornstad died at the scene; Forrest Cole went into a coma and died two weeks later, and Nick Mullon died 14 years later from complications of injuries sustained.
5 May 1981	Kennedy Space Center, US	1		Construction worker Anthony E. Hill, 22, fell more than 100 feet (30 m) from the Kennedy Space Center Launch Complex 39B Service structure.
10 June 1981	Merritt Island National Wildlife Refuge / Kennedy Space Center, US	2		US Fish and Wildlife Service (USFWS) firefighters Scott Maness and Beau Sauselein died while fighting a fire on refuge grounds at Kennedy Space Center. The incident prompted improvements in the USFWS wildfire program to support spaceport operations.
4 December 1985	Vandenberg AFB, US	1		Carl Reich, 49, of Lompoc, CA, an iron worker employed by Hensel Phelps Construction of Greeley, CO, fell 252 feet (77 m) from the mobile service structure of the SLC-6 Space Shuttle launch complex, while bolting a platform onto the structure.
30 January 1986	Titusville, FL, US	1	STS-51-L	NASA engineer Elmer Andrew Thomas, 69, of Titusville, FL suffered a heart attack while watching the Challenger disaster from a NASA viewing room. He died in the hospital two days later.
24 March 1986	Kennedy Space Center, US	1		Joseph L. Tyre, a construction worker employed by Cherokee Steel Erectors, died from injuries sustained in a 90-foot (27 m) fall at the Kennedy Space Center.
4 May 1988	Henderson, Nevada, US	2	Space Shuttle and other solid-fuel vehicles	Bruce Halker and Roy Westerfield lost their lives in the PEPCON disaster, an explosion of a factory that produced ammonium perchlorate for solid-fuel rocket boosters of the Space Shuttle and other launchers.
27 July 1989	Kennedy Space Center, US	1	Space Shuttle	Electrical worker Clarence E. Halley, an employee of EG&G, fell 20 feet (6.1 m) to his death at the Vehicle Assembly Building.
22 December 1989	Cape Canaveral, US	1		A worker refurbishing the 11th level of the Cape Canaveral, Atlas Launch Complex 36B launch tower was killed when an air hose he was using was caught by the pad elevator. The hose wrapped around the worker and pulled him into the elevator shaft, crushing him to death. The pad was being refurbished for commercial satellite launches by General Dynamics starting in 1990.
5 May 1995	Guiana Space Centre, French Guiana	2	Ariane 5	Two technicians, Luc Celle and Jean-Claude Dhainaut, died from anoxia due to major nitrogen leak in confined area of umbilical mast at Ariane 5 launch area during cryogenic M1 main stage testing.
8 July 2001	Cape Canaveral, US	1		Worker disconnecting a coupling on a temporary pipe used to purge a liquid oxygen system near Launch Complex 37. Unexpected buildup of pressure caused the coupling to break loose and strike the employee in the head killing him.
24 August 2001	Cape Canaveral, US	1		Painter Constantine "Gus" Valantasis died after a fall at Cape Canaveral Air Force Station.
1 October 2001	Cape Canaveral, US	1		Crane operator Bill Brooks was killed in an industrial accident at Launch Complex 37.
12 May 2002	Baikonur Cosmodrome, Kazakhstan	8	Buran	Workers repairing the roof of the Baikonur Cosmodrome N-1/Energia vehicle assembly building died when the roof suffered a total structural collapse and crashed 80 meters (260 ft) to the ground. Buran Shuttle was destroyed.
27 March 2003	Angelina National Forest, US	2	STS-107	During debris recovery efforts following the Space Shuttle Columbia disaster, Forest Service employee Charles Krenek of Lufkin, Texas and Pilot Jules F. 'Buzz' Mier Jr. of Arizona were killed when their Bell 407 search chopper crashed in San Augustine County, Texas near the town of Broaddus. Also injured were Matt Tschacher, U.S. Forest Service, South Dakota; Richard Lange, United Space Alliance at Kennedy Space Center in Florida; and Ronnie Dale, NASA's Kennedy Space Center in Florida.
13 September 2003	South Bay, California	1		One contract worker was killed in a "small" explosion during maintenance modifications at a solid rocket fuel mixing facility.
24 February 2004	Satish Dhawan Space Centre, India	6		After curing process of an experimental solid propellant segment weighing 14.5 tonnes, during removal of bottom plate from casting assembly, propellant within segment caught fire resulting in death of four engineers and two assistants. Three workers escaped the inferno with burn injuries. Cast Cure facility building suffered extensive damage.
17 March 2006	Kennedy Space Center, US	1		Steven Owens, a roofer employed by a subcontractor for Kennedy Space Center base operations contractor Space Gateway Company, died after falling from the roof of the Space Life Sciences Lab.
5 May 2010	Redstone Arsenal, US	2		Jim Hawke and Jerry Grimes, employees of Amtec Corp, died after an Ammonium perchlorate explosion in a solid rocket fuel test area.
14 March 2011	Launch Pad 39A, US	1	STS-134	James D. Vanover, a swing-arm contractor for United Space Alliance, fell to his death during preparations for a Space Shuttle mission. The death was later ruled a suicide.
9 November 2013	Plesetsk, Russia	2		Two workers cleaning out a propellant tank died when exposed to poisonous nitrogen tetroxide gases within the tank.
25 June 2014	McGregor, TX, US	1	Falcon 9	Lonnie LeBlanc died from head trauma after a gust of wind blew him off a trailer transporting insulation, while he was holding down its contents with his body.
14 June 2017	Baikonur Cosmodrome, Kazakhstan	2	Progress MS-06	An ISS resupply mission, debris from the launch caused a wildfire that killed Yuri Khatyushin, who was employed to recover rocket debris. Vyacheslav Tyts was injured and died a few days afterward in hospital.
22 February 2020	Barstow, California	1		Daredevil Mike Hughes was killed after a rocket he was in crashed after the parachute was torn away during launch. The launch was being filmed for the Science Channel series Homemade Astronauts.
15 May 2026	Starbase, TX, US	1	Starship	Jose Luis Bautista Jr., 25, a contractor working for Delta Fabrication & Machine Inc., died after an improperly secured beam he was harnessed to collapsed, pulling him down to the ground and resulting in multiple blunt force trauma.

== See also ==
- Criticism of the Space Shuttle program
- Effect of spaceflight on the human body
- Fallen Astronaut
- International Association for the Advancement of Space Safety
- Laika
- Maintenance of the International Space Station
- Skylab 4
