= Viktor Patsayev =

Soviet cosmonaut (1933–1971)

- Виктор Пацаев
- Born: 19 June 1933; Aktyubinsk, Kazakh ASSR, Soviet Union
- Died: 30 June 1971 (aged 38); Outer space
- Resting place: Kremlin Wall Necropolis
- Occupation: Engineer
- Awards: Hero of the Soviet Union
- Space career

Cosmonaut
- Time in space: 23d 18h 21m
- Selection: 1968 USSR Civilian Specialist Group 3
- Mission: Soyuz 11

Viktor Ivanovich Patsayev (Russian: Виктор Иванович Пацаев; 19 June 1933 – 30 June 1971) was a Soviet cosmonaut who flew on the Soyuz 11 mission and was part of the third space crew in human history to die during a space flight.

== Early life ==
Patsayev was born on 19 June 1933 in Aktyubinsk (now Aktobe) in the Kazakh ASSR. His family moved to Alga, also in Kazakhstan, when he was four, and moved again to Nesterov, Kaliningrad, when he was fifteen. He graduated from Penza Polytechnical Institute in 1955, and went on to become an engineer for the Central Aerological Observatory. He joined Sergei Korolev's spacecraft design bureau in 1957, and assisted in the design of the world's first space station, Salyut 1. He was accepted into the Roscosmos Cosmonaut Corps in 1969.

== Soyuz 11 ==
Patsayev, alongside Georgy Dobrovolsky and Vladislav Volkov, was selected as the backup crew for Soyuz 11, scheduled to complete the aborted mission left by Soyuz 10 when it failed to dock with the space station Salyut 1. The primary crew, consisting of Alexei Leonov, Valery Kubasov, and Pyotr Kolodin, were disqualified for the Soyuz 11 mission when a routine medical check showed what appeared to be a lung infection in Kolodin; thus, the backup crew took their place.

The Soyuz 11 crew launched on 19 April, and successfully docked with the Salyut 1, becoming its first crew. Aboard Salyut 1, Patsayev operated the Orion 1 Space Observatory, obtaining spectrograph data for Beta Centauri and Vega, and consequently became the first person to operate a telescope outside the Earth's atmosphere. As part of the Soyuz 11 crew, he spent more than 23 days in orbit before departing for Earth on 29 June due to a small fire on the station.

After a normal re-entry, the capsule was opened and the crew was found dead. Following recovery, it was determined that a valve had opened just prior to leaving orbit that had allowed the capsule's atmosphere to vent away into space, suffocating the crew. Due to the position of Patsayev's body following recovery, he may have been trying to shut the valve manually at the time he lost consciousness.

The incident made Patsayev and his crewmates the only humans in history to have died in space.

== Legacy ==
Patsayev's ashes were interred in the Kremlin Wall on Red Square in Moscow. He was posthumously awarded the title of Hero of the Soviet Union, the Order of Lenin and the title of Pilot-Cosmonaut of the USSR. The lunar crater Patsaev and the minor planet 1791 Patsayev are named for him. A commemorative plaque bearing his name also sits in front of his former school in Alga. A plaque accompanying the Fallen Astronaut sculpture by Paul Van Hoeydonck, placed on the Moon by David Scott during the 1971 Apollo 15 mission, lists Patsayev's name.
