= Patsaev =

Lunar impact crater

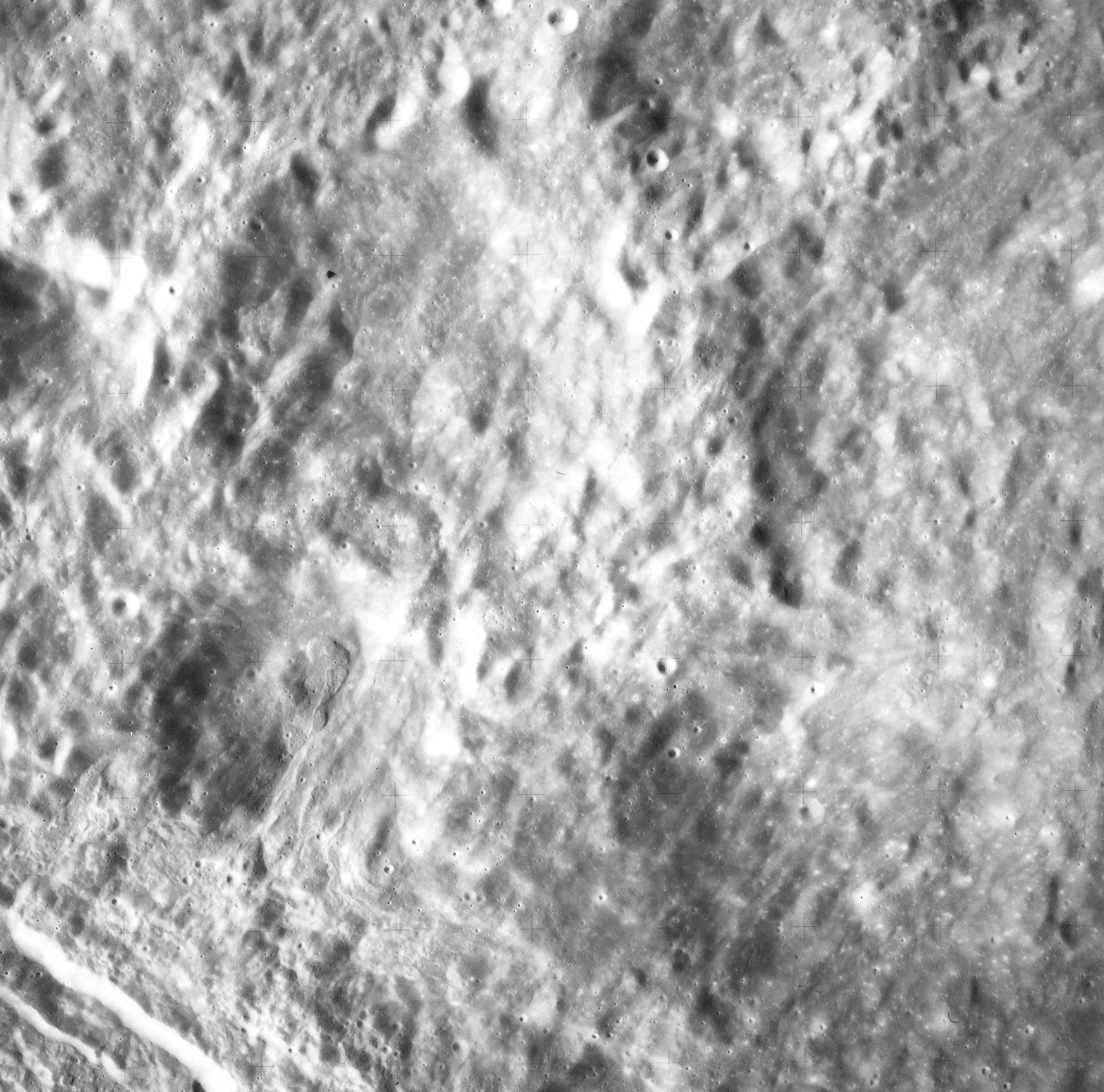
- Patsaev (upper left of center) with Patsaev Q (below left of Patsaev) and Patsaev K (lower right), on the far side of the moon. The rim of Tsiolkovskiy is in lower left corner. (Apollo 15 Mapping Camera image)
- Coordinates: 16.77°S 133.60°E
- Diameter: 55.25 km (34.33 mi)
- Depth: 3.8 km (2.4 mi)
- Colongitude: 227° at sunrise
- Eponym: Viktor I. Patsayev

Patsaev is a lunar impact crater that lies on the far side of the Moon, to the northeast of the prominent crater Tsiolkovskiy. To the northwest is the smaller crater Lander.

This is a heavily damaged crater that now appears as little more than an irregular depression in the surface. Both the outer rim and interior floor are streaked by jumbled ridges of material that are radial to Tsiolkovskiy. Most likely this is ejecta deposited during Tsiolkovskiy's formation.

It was named in 1973 by the IAU after cosmonaut Viktor Patsayev who died in the Soyuz 11 mission.

== Kira ==
Within Patsaev Q is a tiny crater that was officially designated Kira by the International Astronomical Union (IAU). Kira is a Russian feminine name – the crater is named after Kira B. Shingareva, a Russian Geographer known for her work in mapping the far side of the moon. The selenographic coordinates of this feature are 17.6° S, 132.8° E, and the diameter is 3 km.

== Satellite craters ==
By convention these features are identified on lunar maps by placing the letter on the side of the crater midpoint that is closest to Patsaev.

Patsaev	Latitude	Longitude	Diameter
Patsaev K	18.8° S	134.5° E	53 km
Patsaev Q	17.8° S	132.7° E	34 km

The satellite crater Patsaev Q is located just to the southwest of Patsaev. In the past it was suggested that this feature be renamed Chenier, in honor of André Marie Chénier the French poet, but this was never adopted by the IAU.

The crater now known as Bondarenko was formerly known as Patsaev G crater.

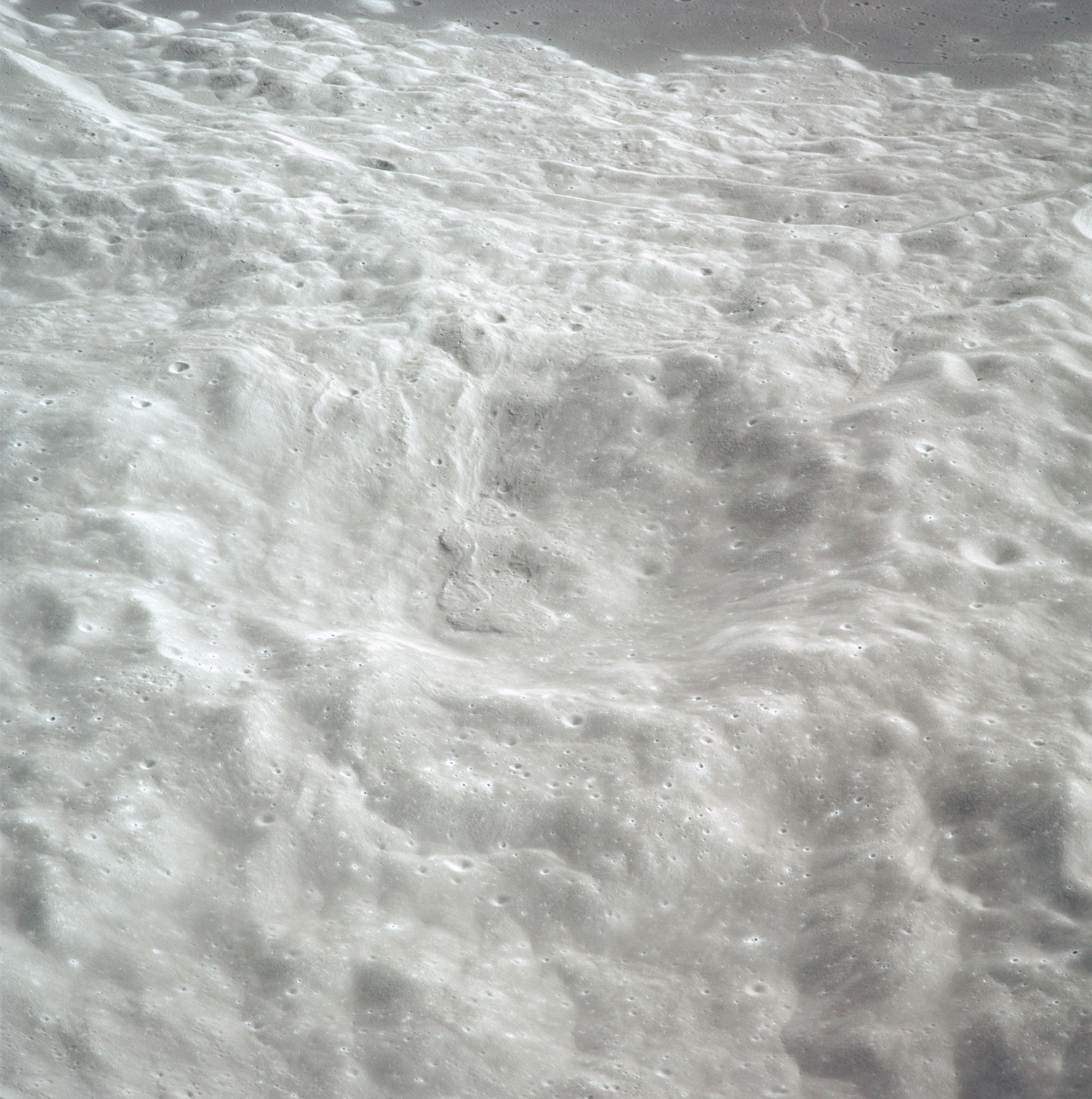
Oblique view facing southwest of Patsaev Q (and Kira) from Apollo 17

== See also ==
- 1791 Patsayev, outer main-belt asteroid
