= Vladislav Volkov =

Soviet cosmonaut (1935–1971)

- Владислав Волков
- Volkov in 1969
- Born: 23 November 1935; Moscow, Soviet Union
- Died: 30 June 1971 (aged 35); Outer space
- Resting place: Kremlin Wall Necropolis
- Occupation: Engineer
- Awards: Hero of the Soviet Union (twice)
- Space career

Cosmonaut
- Time in space: 28d 17h 01m
- Selection: Civilian Specialist Group 2, 1966
- Mission: Soyuz 7, Soyuz 11

Vladislav Nikolayevich Volkov (Russian: Владислав Николаевич Волков; 23 November 1935 – 30 June 1971) was a Soviet cosmonaut who flew on the Soyuz 7 and Soyuz 11 missions. The second mission terminated fatally. Volkov and the two other crew members were asphyxiated on reentry, the only three people to have died in outer space.

== Biography ==
Volkov graduated from the Moscow Aviation Institute in 1959. As an aviation engineer at Korolyov Design Bureau, he was involved in the development of the Vostok and Voskhod spacecraft prior to his selection as a cosmonaut. He flew aboard Soyuz 7 in 1969.

On his second space mission in 1971, Volkov was assigned to Soyuz 11 along with Georgy Dobrovolsky and Viktor Patsayev. The three cosmonauts on this flight spent 23 days on Salyut 1, the world's first space station. After three relatively placid weeks in orbit, however, Soyuz 11 became the second Soviet space flight to terminate fatally, after Soyuz 1.

After a normal re-entry, the Soyuz 11 capsule was opened and the corpses of the three crew members were found inside. It was discovered that a valve had opened just before leaving orbit that had allowed the capsule's atmosphere to vent away into space, causing Volkov and his two flight companions to suffer fatal hypoxia as their cabin descended toward the Earth's atmosphere.

== Awards and remembrance ==
Vladislav Volkov was decorated twice as the Hero of the Soviet Union (first on 22 October 1969 and posthumously on 30 June 1971). He was also awarded the two Orders of Lenin and the title of Pilot-Cosmonaut of the USSR. His ashes were interred in the Kremlin Wall on Red Square in Moscow.

The lunar crater Volkov and the minor planet 1790 Volkov are named in his honor. A street in Moscow is named after him.

Volkov is named on a plaque accompanying the Fallen Astronaut sculpture by Paul Van Hoeydonck which was placed on the Moon by David Scott during the 1971 Apollo 15 mission.

The "Yeniseyles" Soviet research/survey ship was renamed "Kosmonavt Vladislav Volkov" in his honor in 1974.

A tomato variety from Ukraine was named Cosmonaut Volkov in his memory by his friend the space scientist and gardener Mikhailovich Maslov.

Volkov is an honorary citizen of Kaluga and Kirov.

1973 to 2015, the Pilotcosmonaut-Volkov-Award (later Volkov-Cup) was given for the best sports acrobatics since 2016 called Zolotov-Cup; while alive, Volkov became the first chairman of the Soviet Society of Sportsacrobatics in 1970.

In Russia in Space, Brian Harvey described a fleet of communication vessels or "comships", used to track Soviet space missions. The fleet included a ship known as the Vladislav Volkov, built during the 1970s. Following the dissolution of the Soviet Union, several of the fleet's ships were either sold to other governments, or left idle in harbor.

An account of Volkov's life and space career appears in the 2003 book Fallen Astronauts: Heroes Who Died Reaching for the Moon by Colin Burgess.

=== In popular culture ===
In the 1999 film Virus, an alien intelligence infects the research vessel "Akademic Vladislav Volkov" 's computer system via a space transmission. The USNS General Hoyt S. Vandenberg (T-AGM-10) was redecorated for the film.
