= Kira B. Shingareva =

Russian scientist

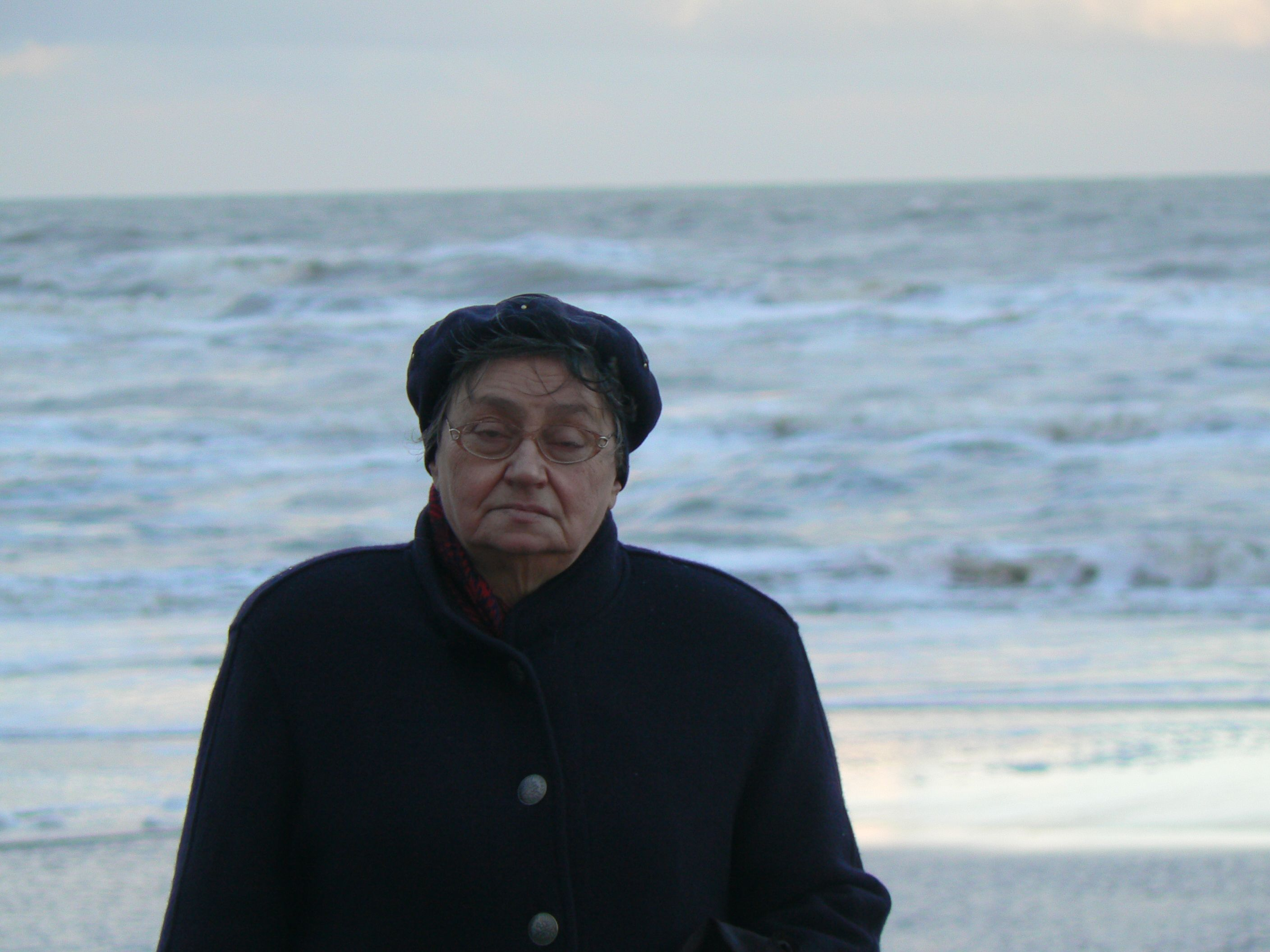
- Born: January 9, 1938; Soviet Union
- Died: September 15, 2013, (age 75 years)
- Other names: Kira Borisovna Shingareva
- Education: Astronomo-geodesist (1959 - Moscow State University for Geodesy and Cartography), Technical University of Dresden (1961), PhD (1974), Economics ( 1978 - Lomonosov Moscow State University)
- Alma mater: Moscow State University for Geodesy and Cartography (MIIGAiK), Technical University of Dresden
- Occupations: Moscow State University for Geodesy and Cartography (professor), Planetary Cartography Laboratory and the Laboratory of Comparative Planetology at the Institute of Space Researches at the Academy of Science (principal scientist)
- Employer(s): Laboratory of Comparative Planetology at the Space Research Institute at the Academy of Science (Principle Scientist - 1977), Department of Economics and Business of MIIGAiK, Planetary Cartography Laboratory of MIIGAiK
- Known for: Mapping the Moon, Mars, Phobos, and Venus

Kira B. Shingareva (January 9, 1938 – September 15, 2013) was a Russian scientist who was involved in the development of updated planetary nomenclature, and mapping regions of the Moon, Mars, Phobos and Venus. She is one of the top cartographers for mapping planetary bodies in the world.

== Early life ==
Shingareva was born in the Soviet Union (now Russia) in 1938 and her mother died when she was five years old. As a chemical engineer, her father was a big influence in her eventual pursuit of mathematics and astronomy. Later on, Shingareva said "she is forever grateful to him for that".

== Education ==
Shingareva has extensive education and experience in astronomy, geography, and economics.

=== Moscow State University for Geodesy and Cartography (MIIGAiK) ===
- Astronomo-geodesist (1959)

=== Technical University of Dresden, Germany ===
- Graduated (1961)
- PhD (1974)
- Obtained a Doctor of Science (1992)

=== Lomonosov Moscow State University ===
- Economics (1976 - 1978)

== Mapping Moons and Planets ==
Some of Shingareva's most notable accomplishments involve the mapping of planetary and celestial bodies. While working for the Russian National Space program, she mapped areas of the Moon, Mars, Phobos and Venus, and assisted with locating potential landing sites for Moon probes. She is one of the first people to map the dark side of the Moon.

Shingareva is also known for contributions to the development of geographic and cartographic names. In 1967 she presented nomenclature for regions that are located on the far side of the Moon, which was a starting point to redeveloping planetary naming schemas.

== Recognition ==
In honor of her accomplishments and contributions, there are a lunar crater and an asteroid that have been named after Shingareva.

- A region of the Patsaev lunar impact crater has been named Kira.

== Notable works ==
- Presentation on Lunar Nomenclature. Proceedings of the Thirteenth General Assembly, 17. Commission de la Lune. Section 2 on Lunar Nomenclature. IAU, Prague.
- Cartographic study of the Lunar surface (картографическая изученность лунной поверхности in: серия исследование космического пространства том 5 москва 1973) Space Research Series Volume 5 Moscow.
- Marov MYa, Krasnopevtseva BV, Shingareva KB (scientific editors), Bolshakov VD, Kremnev RS (editors) (1992) Atlas of Terrestrial Planets and their Moons (Атлас планет Земной группы и их спутников). Miigaik, Moscow.
- Multilingual Maps of the Terrestrial Planets and their Moons
- Geography of extraterrestrial territories. 2009; co-author

== Publications ==
Shingareva has written, collaborated, and co-authored over 150 publications.

- Karachevtseva I., Oberst J., Scholten F., Konopikhin А., Shingareva K., Cherepanova E., Gusakova E., Haase I., Peters O., Plescia J., Robinson M. (2013) Cartography of the Lunokhod-1 Landing Site and Traverse from LRO Image and Stereo Topographic Data. Planetary and Space Science, Vol. 85, p. 175–187. http://dx.doi.org/10.1016/j.pss.2013.06.002 (published September 1, 2013)
- Wählisch M., Stooke P.J., Karachevtseva I.P., Kirk R., Oberst J., Willner K., Nadejdina I.A., Zubarev A.E., Konopikhin A.A., Shingareva K.B. Phobos and Deimos cartography, (2013) Phobos and Deimos cartography. Planetary and Space Science, http://dx.doi.org/10.1016/j.pss.2013.05.012
- IN PRINT: Hargitai, H., Li C., Zhang Z., Zuo W., Mu L., Li H., K.B. Shingareva, and V.V. Shevchenko. (2013, accepted) Chinese and Russian Language Equivalents of the IAU Gazetteer of Planetary Nomenclature: An Overview of Planetary Toponym Localization Methods. Cartographic Journal. http://dx.doi.org/10.1179/1743277413Y.0000000051
