= Karazhal =

Town in Ulytau Region, Kazakhstan

Karazhal Қаражал
- Town
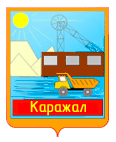
- Coat of arms

- Location in Kazakhstan
- Coordinates: 48°00′16″N 70°47′35″E
- Country: Kazakhstan
- Region: Ulytau Region

Area
  - Total: 8 km^{2} (3.1 sq mi)
- Elevation: 468 m (1,537 ft)

Population (2009)
  - Total: 10,027
- Time zone: UTC+05:00 (Kazakhstan Time)

Karazhal (Kazakh: Қаражал, Qarajal) is a town of regional significance in Ulytau Region of central Kazakhstan. Population: 10,027 (2009 census results); 12,658 (1999 census results).

== Geography ==
Karazhal lies near the Atasu river, a tributary of the Sarysu. Built at the time of the Kazakh SSR, the Kylysh (Қылыш) reservoir lies close to Kylysh village, 17 km (11 mi) to the ESE of the town.

== History ==
It is the town closest to where the Soyuz 11 mission landed. The crew members of Soyuz 11 were the first three people to die outside the Earth's atmosphere.
