= Pyotr Kolodin =

Soviet cosmonaut (1930–2021)

- Пётр Колодин
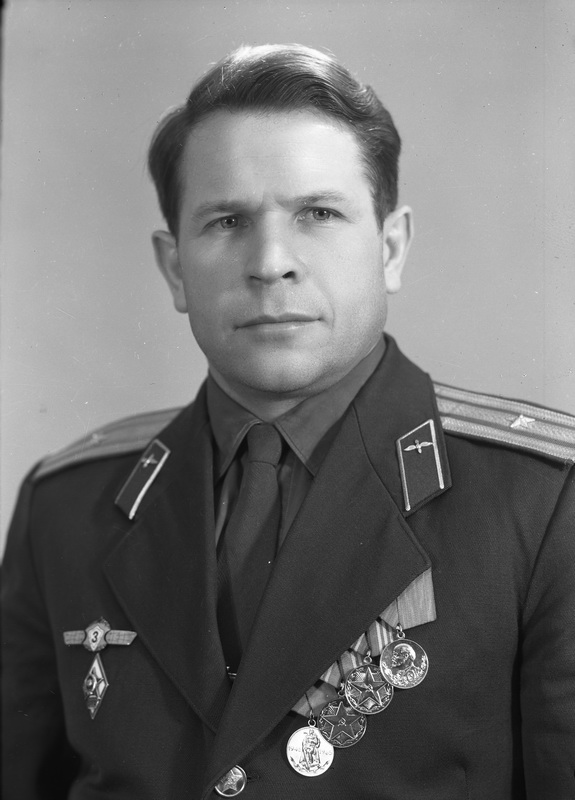
- Born: 23 September 1930; Novovasilyevka, Soviet Union (now Ukraine)
- Died: 4 February 2021 (aged 90)
- Occupation: Engineer
- Space career

Cosmonaut
- Status: Retired
- Selection: TsPK Group 2
- Mission: None

Pyotr Ivanovich Kolodin (Russian: Пётр Иванович Колодин; 23 September 1930 – 4 February 2021) was a Soviet cosmonaut. Although he retired in 1983 without flying in space, Kolodin served non-flying assignments on several spaceflights.

== Biography ==
Kolodin was born in Novovasilyevka, Soviet Union (now in Zaporizhia Oblast, Ukraine). In 1959, he graduated from the Military Academy of Engineering and Radioengineering with a gold medal. Kolodin then became an engineer-officer in the Soviet Armed Forces until his selection as a cosmonaut.

He was selected as a Soviet cosmonaut as part of the TsPK Group 2 in 1963. He entered cosmonaut training in January 1963 and completed training in January 1966. After completing his training, Kolodin served non-flight (backup) roles on the Voskhod 2, Soyuz 5, Soyuz 7, Soyuz 11, and Soyuz 12 spaceflights. He trained as test engineer of the 1st crew to fly on Soyuz 11 to 1st visit the Salyut 1 space station, but the entire crew was bumped when it was suspected that flight engineer Valeri Kubasov had contracted tuberculosis. The crew that replaced them perished during their mission when their capsule depressurized during preparations for re-entry.

Then he was assigned to what was to be the first visitation mission to the Salyut 6 space station, with Vladimir Dzhanibekov as commander (future Soyuz 27). But after the unsuccessful mission of Soyuz 25, it was decided that at least one cosmonaut had to have flight experience (this was also Dzhanibekov's first mission), so he was replaced by Oleg Makarov.

Kolodin later worked as a flight controller until his retirement on 20 April 1983. He was married and has one son.

He died in 2021.
