= Georgy Dobrovolsky =

Soviet cosmonaut (1928–1971)

- Георгий Добровольский
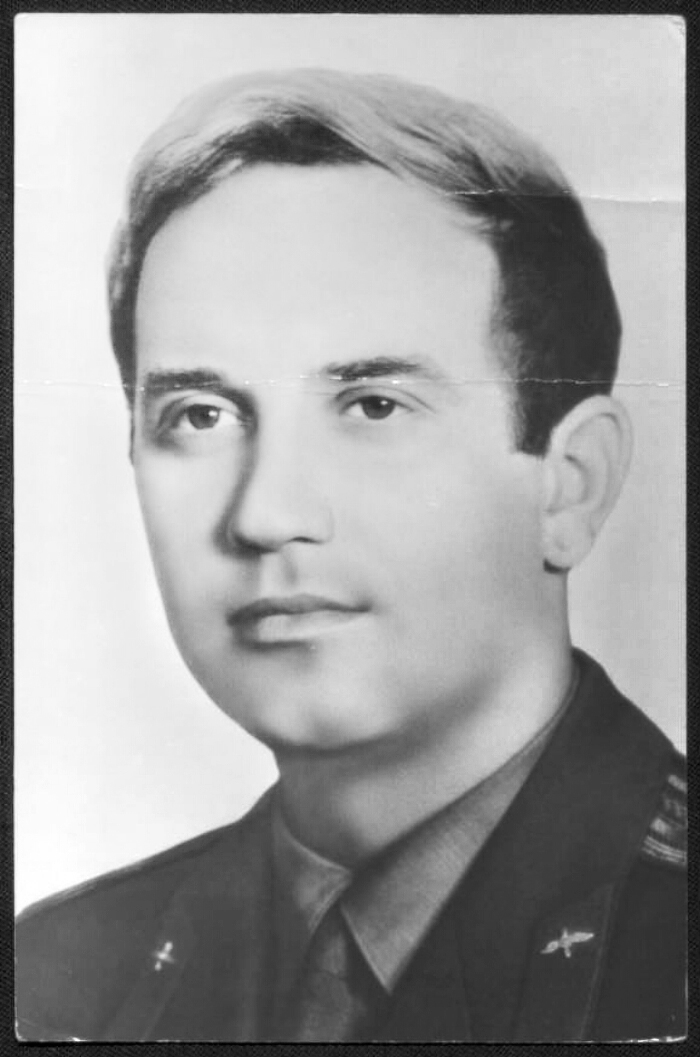
- Born: 1 June 1928; Odessa, Soviet Union
- Died: 30 June 1971 (aged 43); Outer space
- Cause of death: Asphyxiation after Capsule Depressurised During Re-entry
- Resting place: Kremlin Wall Necropolis
- Occupation: Pilot
- Awards: Hero of the Soviet Union; Order of Lenin
- Space career
- Rank: Podpolkovnik, Soviet Air Force
- Time in space: 23d 18h 21m
- Selection: Air Force Group 2
- Missions: Soyuz 11

Georgy Timofeyevich Dobrovolsky (Russian: Георгий Тимофеевич Добровольский; 1 June 1928 – 30 June 1971) was a Soviet cosmonaut who commanded the three-man crew of the Soyuz 11 spacecraft. They became the world's first space station crew aboard Salyut 1, but died of asphyxiation because of an accidentally opened valve. They were the first and only humans to have died in space.

== Biography ==
Dobrovolsky, Viktor Patsayev and Vladislav Volkov flew on the Soyuz 11 mission. The three became the world's first—and so far only—crew to die in outer space during a space flight.

After a normal re-entry, the capsule was opened and the crew was found dead. It was discovered that a valve had opened just prior to leaving orbit that had allowed the capsule's atmosphere to vent away into space, suffocating the crew.

Dobrovolsky's ashes were placed in an urn in the Kremlin Wall Necropolis on Red Square in Moscow. Among the pallbearers were Alexei Leonov (who had been the prime-crew commander scheduled to launch on Soyuz 11), Vladimir Shatalov, Andriyan Nikolayev, and American astronaut Thomas P. Stafford. Dobrovolsky was posthumously awarded the title of Hero of the Soviet Union, the Order of Lenin, and the title of Pilot-Cosmonaut of the USSR.

A plaque listing Dobrovolsky's name accompanied the Fallen Astronaut sculpture by Paul Van Hoeydonck which was placed on the Moon by David Scott of the Apollo 15 mission.
