= Soyuz 11 =

1971 Soviet spaceflight, first spaceflight to visit a space station, and fatal disaster

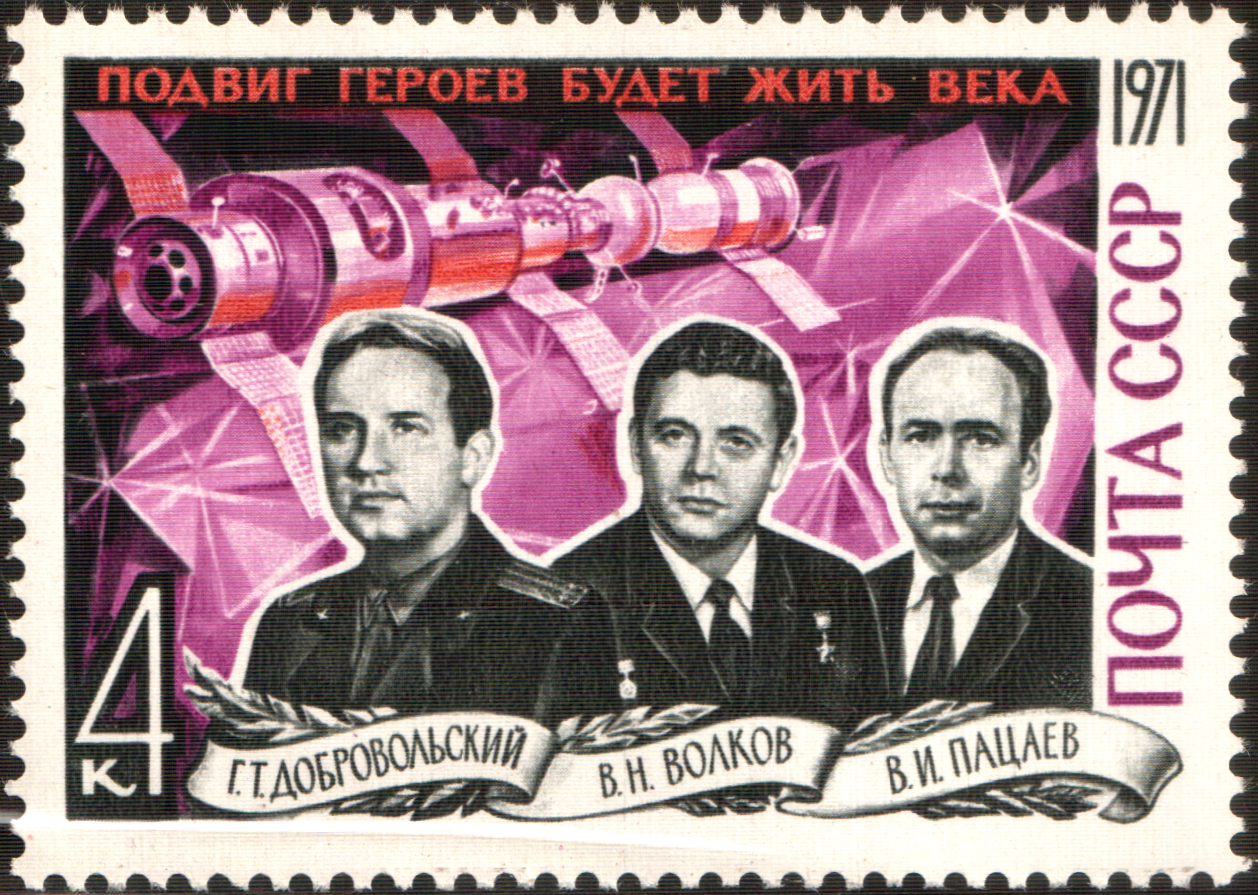
- Soyuz 11 on a 1971 commemorative stamp of the Soviet Union
- Mission type: Dock with Salyut 1
- Operator: Soviet space program
- COSPAR ID: 1971-053A
- SATCAT no.: 05283
- Mission duration: 23 days, 18 hours, 21 minutes, 43 seconds
- Orbits completed: 383

Spacecraft properties
- Spacecraft: Soyuz, 7K-T No. 32
- Spacecraft type: Soyuz 7K-OKS
- Manufacturer: OKB-1
- Launch mass: 6,565 kg (14,473 lb)
- Landing mass: 1,200 kg (2,600 lb)

Crew
- Crew size: 3
- Members: Georgy Dobrovolsky; Vladislav Volkov; Viktor Patsayev
- Callsign: Янтарь (Yantar – "Amber")

Start of mission
- Launch date: 04:55:09, 6 June 1971 (UTC)
- Rocket: Soyuz
- Launch site: Baikonur, Site 1/5

End of mission
- Landing date: 23:16:52, 29 June 1971 (UTC)
- Landing site: 90 km (56 mi) southwest of Karazhal, Karaganda Oblast, Kazakh SSR, Soviet Union (47°21′23″N 70°07′16″E)

Orbital parameters
- Reference system: Geocentric orbit
- Regime: Low Earth orbit
- Perigee altitude: 185 km (100 nmi; 115 mi)
- Apogee altitude: 217 km (117 nmi; 135 mi)
- Inclination: 51.6°
- Period: 88.3 minutes

Docking with Salyut 1
- Docking date: 7 June 1971
- Undocking date: 29 June 1971, 18:28 UTC
- Time docked: 22 days
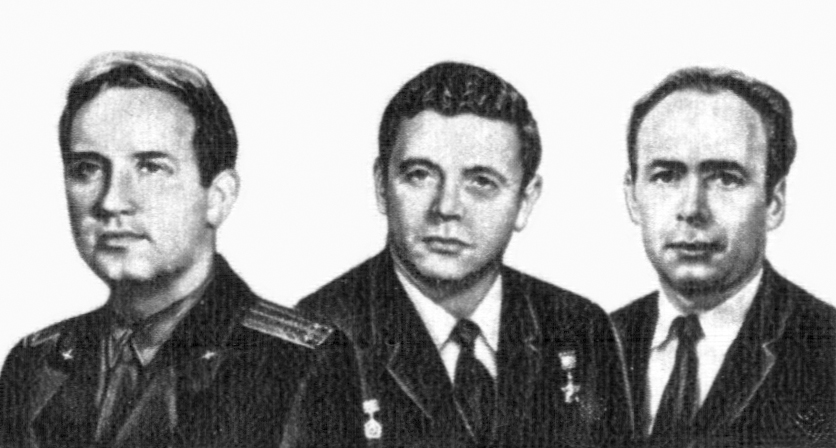
- Zvezda Rocket Left to right: Dobrovolsky, Volkov and Patsayev Soyuz programme

Soyuz 11 (Russian: Союз 11, lit. 'Union 11') was the only crewed mission (but failed) to board the world's first space station, Salyut 1. (Note: Soyuz 10 had soft-docked, but had not been able to enter due to latching problems.) The crew – Georgy Dobrovolsky, Vladislav Volkov, and Viktor Patsayev – arrived at the space station on 7 June 1971, and departed on 29 June 1971. The mission ended in disaster when the crew capsule depressurised during preparations for re-entry, killing the three-person crew. The crew members of Soyuz 11 are the only humans to have died in space (i.e. above the Kármán line). (Note: STS-107 had re-entered the atmosphere when its accident occurred.)

== Crew ==
Position	Cosmonaut
Commander	Georgy Dobrovolsky; Only spaceflight
Flight engineer	Vladislav Volkov; Second spaceflight
Research engineer	Viktor Patsayev; Only spaceflight

=== Backup crew ===
Position	Cosmonaut
Commander	Aleksei Gubarev
Flight engineer	Vitaly Sevastyanov
Research engineer	Anatoly Voronov

=== Original crew ===
Position	Cosmonaut
Commander	Alexei Leonov
Flight engineer	Valery Kubasov
Research engineer	Pyotr Kolodin

=== Crew notes ===
The original prime crew for Soyuz 11 consisted of Alexei Leonov, Valery Kubasov, and Pyotr Kolodin. A medical X-ray examination four days before launch suggested that Kubasov might have tuberculosis, and according to the mission rules, the prime crew was replaced with the backup crew. For Dobrovolsky and Patsayev, this was to be their first space mission. After the failure of Salyut 2 to orbit, Kubasov and Leonov were reassigned to Soyuz 19 for the Apollo-Soyuz Test Project in 1975.

== Mission ==
=== Parameters ===
- Mass: 6,565 kg (14,473 lb)
- Perigee: 185.0 km (115.0 mi; 99.9 nmi)
- Apogee: 217.0 km (134.8 mi; 117.2 nmi)
- Inclination: 51.6°
- Period: 88.3 minutes

=== Flight ===
The Soyuz 7K-OKS spacecraft was launched on 6 June 1971, from the Baikonur Cosmodrome in the central Kazakh Soviet Socialist Republic, and used the callsign Yantar (Amber). Several months earlier, the first mission to the Salyut, Soyuz 10, had failed to dock successfully with the station. During the first day of the flight, maneuvers were made to effect a rendezvous with the uncrewed Salyut (1971-032A). When Soyuz 11 was 6 to 7 kilometres (3.7 to 4.3 mi; 3.2 to 3.8 nmi) from Salyut, automatic devices took over, and in 24 minutes closed the gap between the two ships to 9 metres (30 ft) and reduced the relative speed difference to 0.2 metres per second (0.66 ft/s). Control of the ships went from automatic back to manual at 100 metres (330 ft). Docking took 3 hours 19 minutes to complete and involved making the connection mechanically rigid, engaging various electrical and hydraulic links, and establishing air-tight seals before locks could be opened. When the pressure was equalized between the ships, the locks were opened and all three members of the crew passed into Salyut 1. Soyuz 11 successfully docked with Salyut 1 on 7 June 1971 and the cosmonauts remained on board for 22 days, setting space endurance records that would hold until the American Skylab 2 mission in May and June 1973.

Upon first entering the station, the crew encountered a smoky and burnt atmosphere, and after replacing part of the ventilation system, spent the next day back in their Soyuz until the air cleared. Their stay in Salyut was productive, including live television broadcasts. A fire broke out on day 11 of their stay, causing mission planners to consider abandoning the station. The planned highlight of the mission was to have been the observation of an N1 rocket launch, but the launch was postponed. The crew also found that using the exercise treadmill, as they were required to twice a day, caused the whole station to vibrate. Pravda released news of the mission and regular updates while it was in progress.

=== Re-entry and death ===
On 29 June 1971, the three cosmonauts loaded scientific specimens, films, tapes, and other gear into Soyuz 11, then transferred manual control back from Salyut 1 to Soyuz 11 and returned to their ferry craft, with undocking occurring at 18:28 GMT. Soyuz 11 flew co-orbit for a while before it retro-fired at 22:35 GMT in preparation for re-entry. Before re-entering Earth's atmosphere, both the work compartment and the service module were jettisoned. This occurred at about 22:47 GMT. Radio communications abruptly ended when the work compartment separated, well before the normal ionospheric blackout.

Almost 25 minutes later, Soyuz 11's automatic systems landed the craft at 23:16:52 GMT (04:16 local time), 90 kilometres (56 mi; 49 nmi) southwest of Karazhal in Kazakhstan, after an abnormally silent return to Earth. The total flight duration of the crew had been 570.22 hours and involved 383 orbits—18 prior to docking, 362 docked, and 3 after undocking. When the recovery team opened the capsule of the Soyuz 11, they found all three men dead.

Kerim Kerimov, chair of the State Commission, recalled: "Outwardly, there was no damage whatsoever. They knocked on the side, but there was no response from within. On opening the hatch, they found all three men in their couches, motionless, with dark-blue patches on their faces and trails of blood from their noses and ears. They removed them from the descent module. Dobrovolsky was still warm. The doctors gave artificial respiration. Based on their reports, the cause of death was suffocation".

=== Cause of death ===
It quickly became apparent that the cosmonauts had asphyxiated. The fault was traced to a breathing ventilation valve, located between the orbital module and the descent module, that had been jolted open as the descent module separated from the service module, 12 minutes and 3 seconds after retrofire. The two modules were held together by explosive bolts designed to fire sequentially; in fact, they had fired simultaneously. The explosive force of the simultaneous bolt firing caused the internal mechanism of the pressure equalisation valve to loosen a seal that was usually discarded later and which normally allowed for automatic adjustment of the cabin pressure. The valve opened at an altitude of 168 kilometres (104 mi; 91 nmi), and the resultant loss of pressure was fatal in less than a minute. The valve was located beneath the seats and was impossible to find and block before the air was lost. Flight recorder data from the single cosmonaut outfitted with biomedical sensors showed cardiac arrest occurred within 40 seconds of pressure loss. By 15 minutes 35 seconds after retrofire, the cabin pressure was zero, and remained there until the capsule entered the Earth's atmosphere. Patsayev's body was found positioned near the valve, and he may have been attempting to close or block the valve at the time he lost consciousness. An extensive investigation was conducted to study all components and systems of Soyuz 11 that could have caused the accident, although doctors quickly concluded that the cosmonauts had died of asphyxiation.

The autopsies at Burdenko Main Military Clinical Hospital found that the cause of death for the cosmonauts was haemorrhaging of the blood vessels in their brains, with lesser amounts of bleeding under their skin, in their inner ears, and in their nasal cavities, all of which occurred as exposure to a vacuum environment caused the oxygen and nitrogen in their bloodstreams to bubble and rupture vessels. Their blood was also found to contain heavy concentrations of lactic acid; lactic acid buildup (in tissues and blood) is a sign of inadequate mitochondrial oxygenation, which may be due to hypoxemia (low blood oxygen), poor blood flow (e.g., decompression) or a combination of both. Although they could have remained conscious for almost 40 seconds after decompression began, less than 20 seconds would have passed before the effects of oxygen starvation made it impossible for them to function.

== Aftermath ==
Alexei Leonov, who would have originally commanded Soyuz 11, had advised the cosmonauts before the flight that they should manually close the valves between the orbital and descent modules, as he did not trust them to shut automatically, a procedure he thought up during extensive time in the Soyuz simulator. However, it appears that the crew did not do this. After the flight, Leonov went back and tried closing one of the valves himself, and found that it took nearly a minute to do so, too long in an emergency situation with the spacecraft's atmosphere escaping quickly.

Soviet television did not announce the deaths for six hours after they occurred. State media attempted to downplay the tragic end of the mission, and instead emphasized its accomplishments during the crew's stay aboard Salyut 1. Since they did not publicly announce the exact cause of the cosmonauts' deaths for almost two years afterwards, United States space planners were extremely worried about the upcoming Skylab program, as they could not be certain whether prolonged time in a micro-g environment had turned out to be fatal. However, NASA doctor Charles Berry maintained a firm conviction that the cosmonauts could not have died from spending too many weeks in weightlessness. Until the Soviets finally disclosed what had really happened, Berry theorized that the crew had died from inhaling toxic substances.

A film that was later declassified showed support crews attempting cardiopulmonary resuscitation (CPR) on the cosmonauts. (Note: This footage was shown during the 1994 TV adaptation of the documentary Moon Shot by Alan Shepard and Deke Slayton.) Until autopsy, they were not known to have died because of a capsule depressurisation. The ground crew had lost audio contact with the crew before re-entry began, and had already begun preparations for contingencies in case the crew had been lost.

The cosmonauts were given a large state funeral and buried in the Kremlin Wall Necropolis at Red Square, Moscow, near the remains of Yuri Gagarin. They were also each posthumously awarded the Hero of the Soviet Union medal.

The United States sent Tom Stafford, then NASA's chief astronaut, to represent President Richard Nixon at the funeral, where the Soviets asked him to be one of the pallbearers. It came at the beginning of a period of more cordial relations between the two nations that would lead to the joint Apollo–Soyuz mission. President Nixon also issued an official statement following the accident:

The American people join in expressing to you and the Soviet people our deepest sympathy on the tragic deaths of the three Soviet cosmonauts. The whole world followed the exploits of these courageous explorers of the unknown and shares the anguish of their tragedy. But the achievements of cosmonauts Dobrovolsky, Volkov and Patsayev remain. It will, I am sure, prove to have contributed greatly to the further achievements of the Soviet program for the exploration of space and thus to the widening of man's horizons.

The Soyuz spacecraft was extensively redesigned after this incident to carry only two cosmonauts. The extra room meant that the crew could wear Sokol space suits during launch and landing. The Sokol was a lightweight pressure suit intended for emergency use; updated versions of the suit remain in use.

== Memorials ==
The Soyuz 11 landed 90 kilometres (56 mi; 49 nmi) south-west of Karazhal, Karagandy, Kazakhstan, and about 550 kilometres (340 mi; 300 nmi) north-east of Baikonur. A memorial monument in the form of a three-sided metallic column, with the engraved image of the face of each crew member set into a stylized triangle on each of the three sides, was placed at the site. The memorial is in open, flat country, far from any populated area, within a small, circular fence.

In 2012, the memorial was found to have been vandalized beyond repair, with only the base of the metallic column remaining and any roads leading to it overgrown.

In 2013, Russian space agency Roscosmos restored the site with a redesigned monument, reflecting the three-sided form of the original, but this time constructed from brick. Also placed at the site was a sign explaining the history of the location and the fate of the original monument.

Craters on the Moon were named after the three cosmonauts: Dobrovolʹskiy, Volkov, and Patsaev. The names of the three cosmonauts are included on the Fallen Astronaut commemorative plaque placed on the Moon during the Apollo 15 mission in August 1971. To honour the loss of the Soyuz 11 crew, a group of hills on Pluto is also named Soyuz Colles.

In the city of Penza, Russia, near the school gymnasium No. 39, in honour of the dead cosmonauts, a memorial stele was made with quotes from the poem by the poet Yevgeny Yevtushenko "Between our Motherland and you is a two-way eternal connection" (Russian: "Между Родиной нашей и вами – двусторонняя вечная связь").

In addition to the Soviet postage stamp depicted above, a series of postage stamps of the Emirate of Ajman and Bulgaria was issued in memory of the cosmonauts in 1971. Equatorial Guinea also released a series of stamps depicting the entire Soyuz 11 mission.

== See also ==
- List of spaceflight-related accidents and incidents
- Soyuz 1, another fatal accident in the Soyuz program
- Apollo 1
- Space Shuttle Challenger disaster
- Space Shuttle Columbia disaster
- Timeline of longest spaceflights

== Bibliography ==
- Burgess, Colin; Doolan, Kate; Vis, Bert (2003). Fallen Astronauts: Heroes Who Died Reaching for the Moon. Lincoln: University of Nebraska Press. ISBN 0-8032-6212-4.
- Ivanovich, Grujica S. (2008). Salyut – The First Space Station: Triumph and Tragedy. Praxis. ISBN 978-0-387-73585-6.
- Office of Technology Assessment, United States Congress (2005). Salyut: Soviet Steps Toward Permanent Human Presence in Space – A Technical Memorandum. Seattle: University Press of the Pacific. ISBN 1-4102-2138-5.
