= Fallen Astronaut =

Sculpture by Paul Van Hoeydonck placed on the Moon

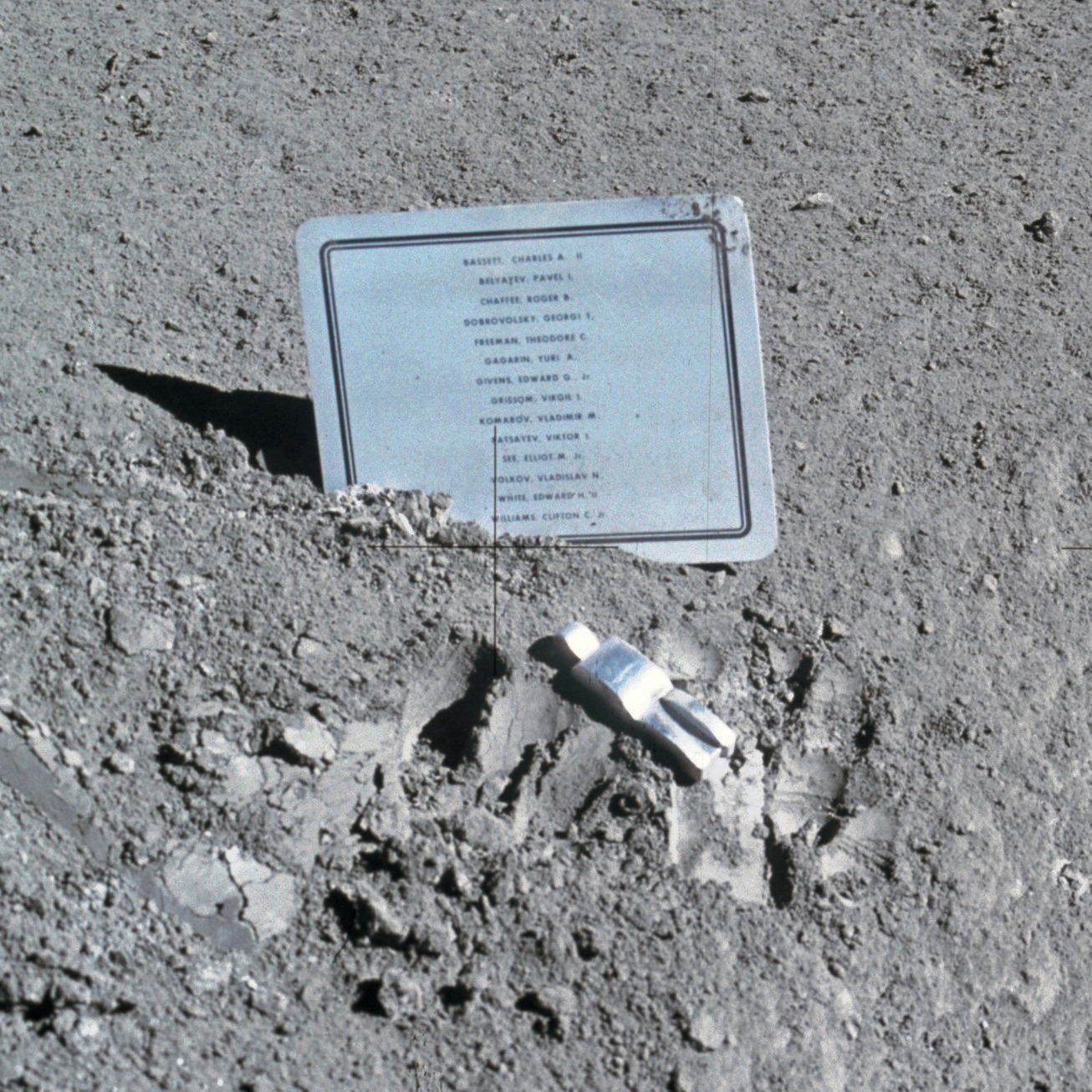
- Fallen Astronaut statue and a name plaque on the surface of the Moon
- Artist: Paul Van Hoeydonck
- Year: 1971
- Medium: Aluminum
- Dimensions: 8.9 cm (3.5 in)
- Location: Hadley Rille, Moon
- Coordinates: 26.13222°N 3.63386°E

Fallen Astronaut is a 3.5-inch (8.9 cm) aluminum sculpture created by Belgian artist Paul Van Hoeydonck. It is a stylized figure of an astronaut in a spacesuit, intended to commemorate the astronauts and cosmonauts who have died in the advancement of space exploration. It was commissioned and placed on the Moon by the crew of Apollo 15 at Hadley Rille on August 2, 1971, UTC, next to a plaque listing 14 names of those who had died up to that time. The statue lies on the ground among several footprints.

The crew kept the memorial's existence a secret until after completing their mission. After public disclosure, the National Air and Space Museum requested a replica of the statue. Controversy soon followed, as Van Hoeydonck claimed a different understanding of the agreement with the astronauts and attempted to sell up to 950 copies of the figure. He finally relented under pressure from NASA, which had a strict policy against commercial exploitation of the US government space program.

== Commission ==
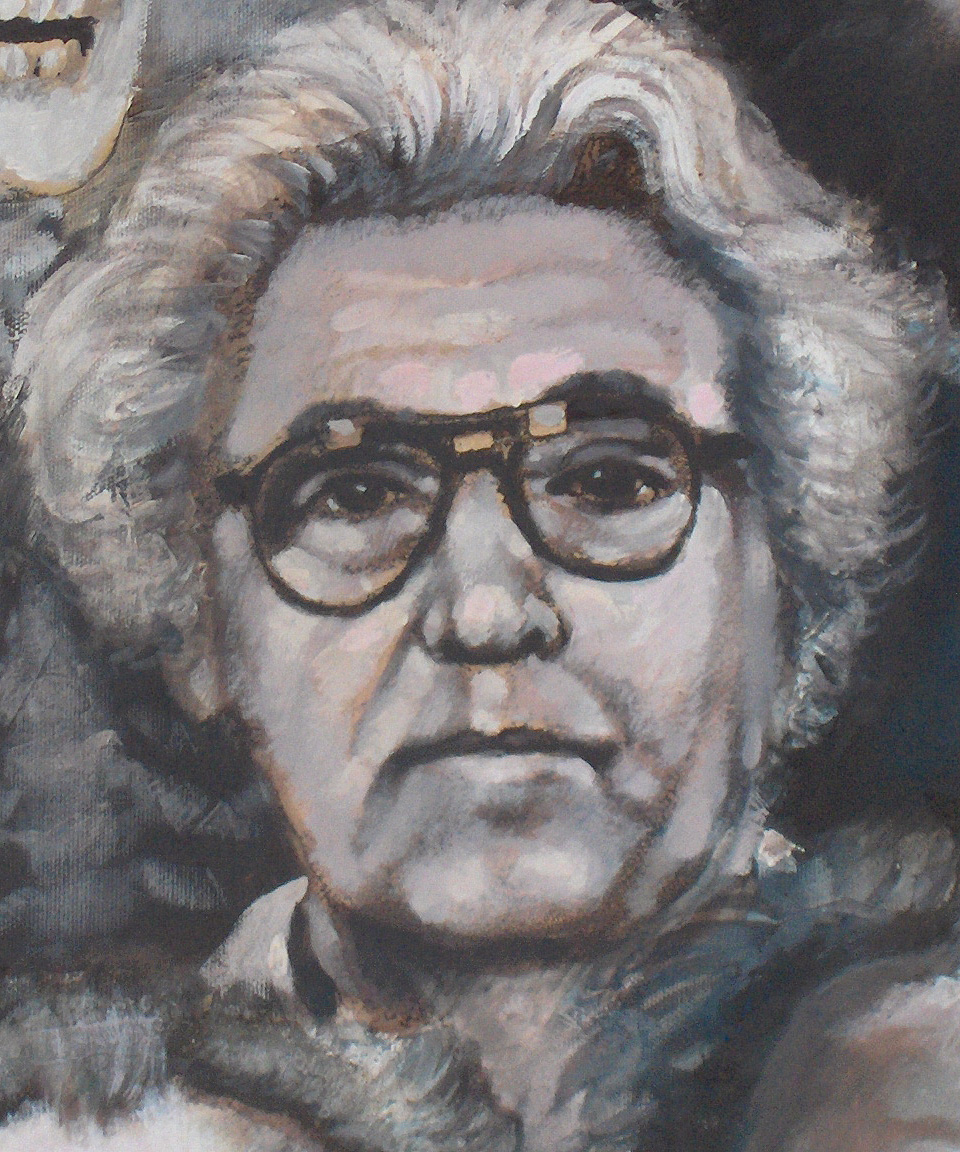
Portrait of Van Hoeydonck by Willy Bosschem

Before his Apollo 15 lunar mission, astronaut David Scott met Belgian painter and printmaker Paul Van Hoeydonck at a dinner party. They agreed that Van Hoeydonck would create a small statuette for Scott to place on the Moon, though their recollections of the details differ. Scott's purpose was to commemorate those astronauts and cosmonauts who had died in the furtherance of space exploration. He designed and separately made a plaque listing 14 American and Soviet names. Van Hoeydonck was given a set of design specifications: the sculpture was to be lightweight but sturdy, capable of withstanding the temperature extremes of the Moon; it could not be identifiably male or female, nor of any identifiable ethnic group. According to Scott, it was agreed Van Hoeydonck's name would not be made public to avoid the commercial exploitation of the US government's space program. Scott got permission from top NASA management before the mission to take the statue aboard his spacecraft. Still, he only disclosed it publicly in a post-mission press conference.

Van Hoeydonck gives a different account of the agreement: according to an interview in the Belgian newspaper Le Soir, the statue was supposed to represent all mankind, not only fallen astronauts or cosmonauts. He claimed he did not know the statue would be used as a memorial for the fallen space-goers, and the name given to the work was neither chosen nor approved by him; he had intended the figure to be left standing upright. He also denies it was agreed he would remain anonymous. Both his and Scott's versions of events are given in an article in Slate magazine in 2013. In 2021, Scott wrote a document entitled "Memorandum for the Record", however, in which he stated that the figurine left on the Moon was designed and fabricated by NASA personnel, with the design based on stick figures used as location symbols of bathrooms.

== Placement on the Moon ==
Astronaut David Scott secretly placed the Fallen Astronaut statue on the Moon during the Apollo 15 mission, near the completion of his work on August 2, 1971, along with a plaque bearing the names of eight American astronauts and six Soviet cosmonauts who had died in service:

Astronauts and cosmonauts named on the Fallen Astronaut plaque
Name	Date	Cause
Theodore C. Freeman	October 31, 1964	Aircraft accident
Charles A. Bassett II	February 28, 1966	Aircraft accident
Elliot M. See Jr.	February 28, 1966	Aircraft accident
Virgil I. Grissom	January 27, 1967	Apollo 1 fire
Roger B. Chaffee	January 27, 1967	Apollo 1 fire
Edward H. White II	January 27, 1967	Apollo 1 fire
Vladimir M. Komarov	April 24, 1967	Soyuz 1 re-entry parachute failure
Edward G. Givens Jr.	June 6, 1967	Automobile accident
Clifton C. Williams Jr.	October 5, 1967	Aircraft accident
Yuri A. Gagarin	March 27, 1968	Aircraft accident
Pavel I. Belyayev	January 10, 1970	Illness
Georgiy T. Dobrovolsky	June 30, 1971	Soyuz 11 re-entry pressurization failure
Viktor I. Patsayev	June 30, 1971	Soyuz 11 re-entry pressurization failure
Vladislav N. Volkov	June 30, 1971	Soyuz 11 re-entry pressurization failure

Scott photographed the memorial but waited for a post-mission press conference to disclose its existence. He noted, "Sadly, two names are missing, those of Valentin Bondarenko and Grigori Nelyubov." He explained that the Western world was unaware of their deaths because of the secrecy surrounding the Soviet space program at the time. Also missing was Robert Henry Lawrence Jr., the first black astronaut and a U.S. Air Force officer selected for the Manned Orbiting Laboratory program who was killed in a training accident in 1967, and Michael J. Adams, one of twelve pilots who flew the North American X-15 operated by the Air Force and NASA who died during a 1967 test flight above 50 miles.

== Controversy ==
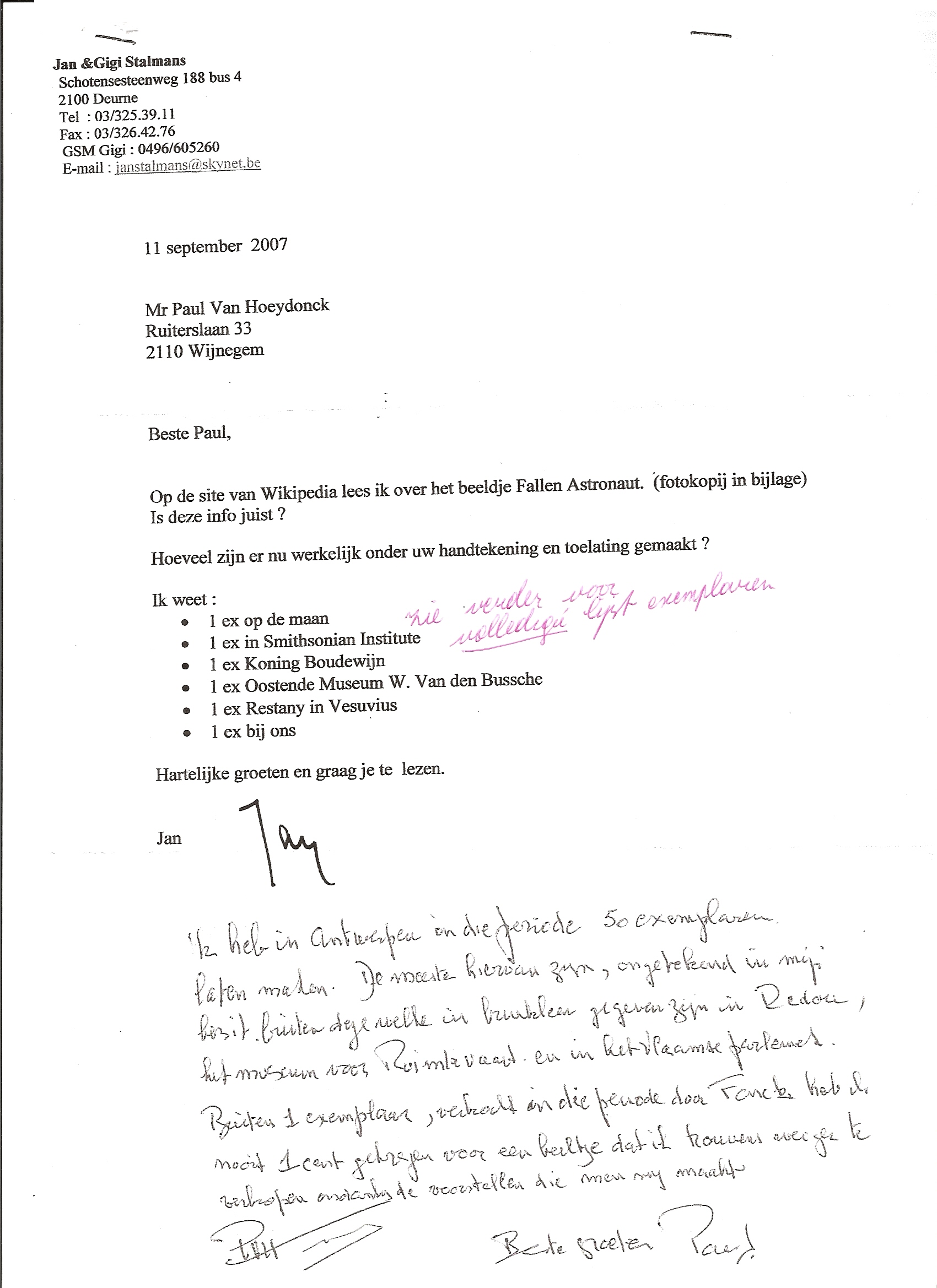
Query from Jan Stalmans to Van Hoeydonck about the number of outstanding replicas, with handwritten reply

During their press conference, the crew disclosed the statuette's existence and the National Air and Space Museum requested that a replica be made for public display. The crew agreed that it be displayed "with good taste and without publicity". They gave the replica to the Smithsonian Institution on April 17, 1972, the day after CBS anchorman Walter Cronkite referred to the Fallen Astronaut and plaque as the first art installation on the Moon during the broadcast of the Apollo 16 launch.

In May 1972, Scott learned that Van Hoeydonck planned to make and sell more replicas. He believed this would violate the spirit of their agreement and of NASA's policy against commercial exploitation of the space program, and he tried to persuade Van Hoeydonck to refrain. In July 1972, Van Hoeydonck placed a full-page advertisement in Art in America magazine offering 950 replicas of Fallen Astronaut signed by the sculptor, sold by the Waddell Gallery of New York for $750 each, a second edition at a lower, unspecified price, and a catalog edition at $5. Van Hoeydonck retracted his permission for the replicas after receiving complaints from NASA, but not before one was sold. Using a box numbered 200/950 and prepared for the limited edition, a sample figure was sold to a Morgan Stanley investment banker who collected space artifacts and works of art.

On September 11, 2007, art journalist Jan Stalmans asked Van Hoeydonck how many replicas existed. Van Hoeydonck returned a handwritten response on the letter that 50 copies had been made, most of which were still in his possession unsigned.

Van Hoeydonck verified the sale following an investigation that began in 2015 when the piece surfaced on eBay. It was bought by a collector living in the UK.

== Replicas ==
In January 2019, Van Hoeydonck and Apollo 15 Command Module Pilot Al Worden announced the sale of a limited edition replica inside a blue acrylic block, as Van Hoeydonck originally intended, which would have allowed the statue to be placed upright on the Moon to "symbolize humanity rising" via space travel. NASA had rejected the acrylic enclosure's inclusion on the flight as a fire hazard. A smaller number of enlarged sculptures are also to be sold.

== See also ==
- Space art#Art in space
- List of artificial objects on the Moon
- List of extraterrestrial memorials
- List of spaceflight-related accidents and incidents
- Space Mirror Memorial
