= Paul Van Hoeydonck =

Belgian sculptor and painter (1925–2025)

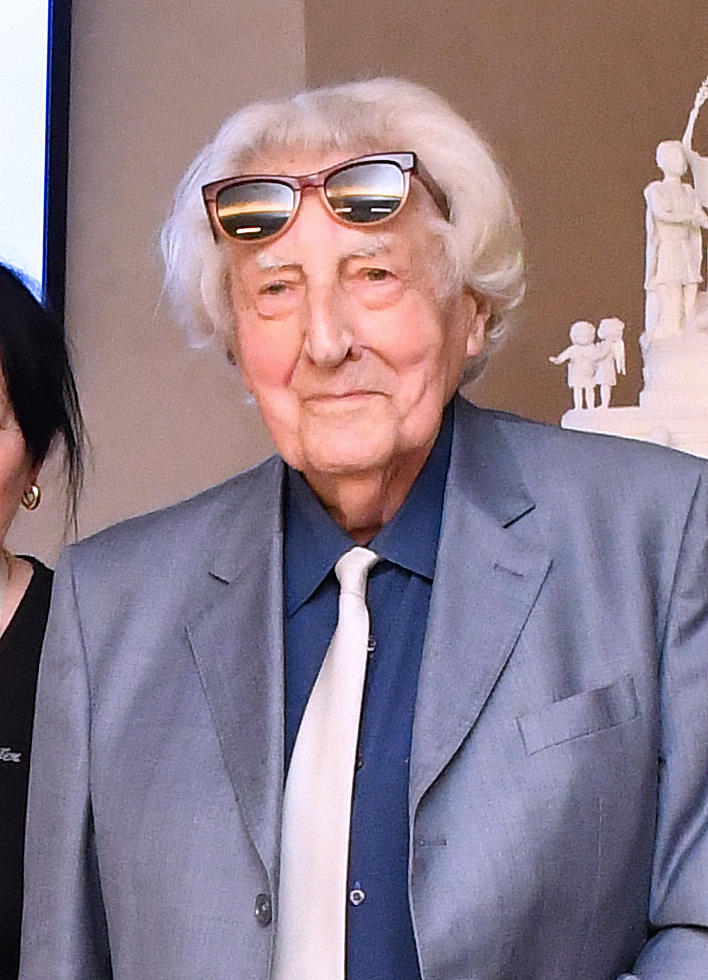
- Van Hoeydonck in 2019
- Born: 8 October 1925; Antwerp, Belgium
- Died: 3 May 2025 (aged 99); Wijnegem, Belgium
- Occupations: Sculptor; painter

Paul Van Hoeydonck (8 October 1925 – 3 May 2025) was a Belgian sculptor and painter.

Van Hoeydonck was best known for his 1971 sculpture Fallen Astronaut, which commemorated fallen astronauts and was placed on the Moon by the Apollo 15 crew, where it remains today. He also sculpted Spaceman, which is on display at the Royal Museum of Fine Arts Antwerp. From 2013 to 2014, he held a personal exhibition at Gembloux Agro-Bio Tech. In 2012, he received an honorary doctorate from the University of Liège.

Paul Van Hoeydonck died in Wijnegem on 3 May 2025, at the age of 99.
