= Perepelkin =

Perepelkin is an alternate transcription of the Russian name Perepyolkin.

It can refer to:

- Yevgeny Perepyolkin, astronomer
- Perepelkin (lunar crater)
- Perepelkin (Martian crater)
