= Danjon =

Danjon may refer to:

- André-Louis Danjon (1890–1967), French astronomer
- Danjon scale, used for measuring lunar eclipse brightness
- Danjon (crater), a lunar crater
