= Glaude =

Glaude is a surname. Notable people with the surname include:

- Donald Glaude, American house music artist, DJ, and remixer
- Eddie Glaude (born 1968), African-American Studies scholar
- Gerry Glaude (1927–2017), Canadian ice hockey player

== See also ==
- Claude (surname)
