= Sherrington (crater) =

Crater on the Moon

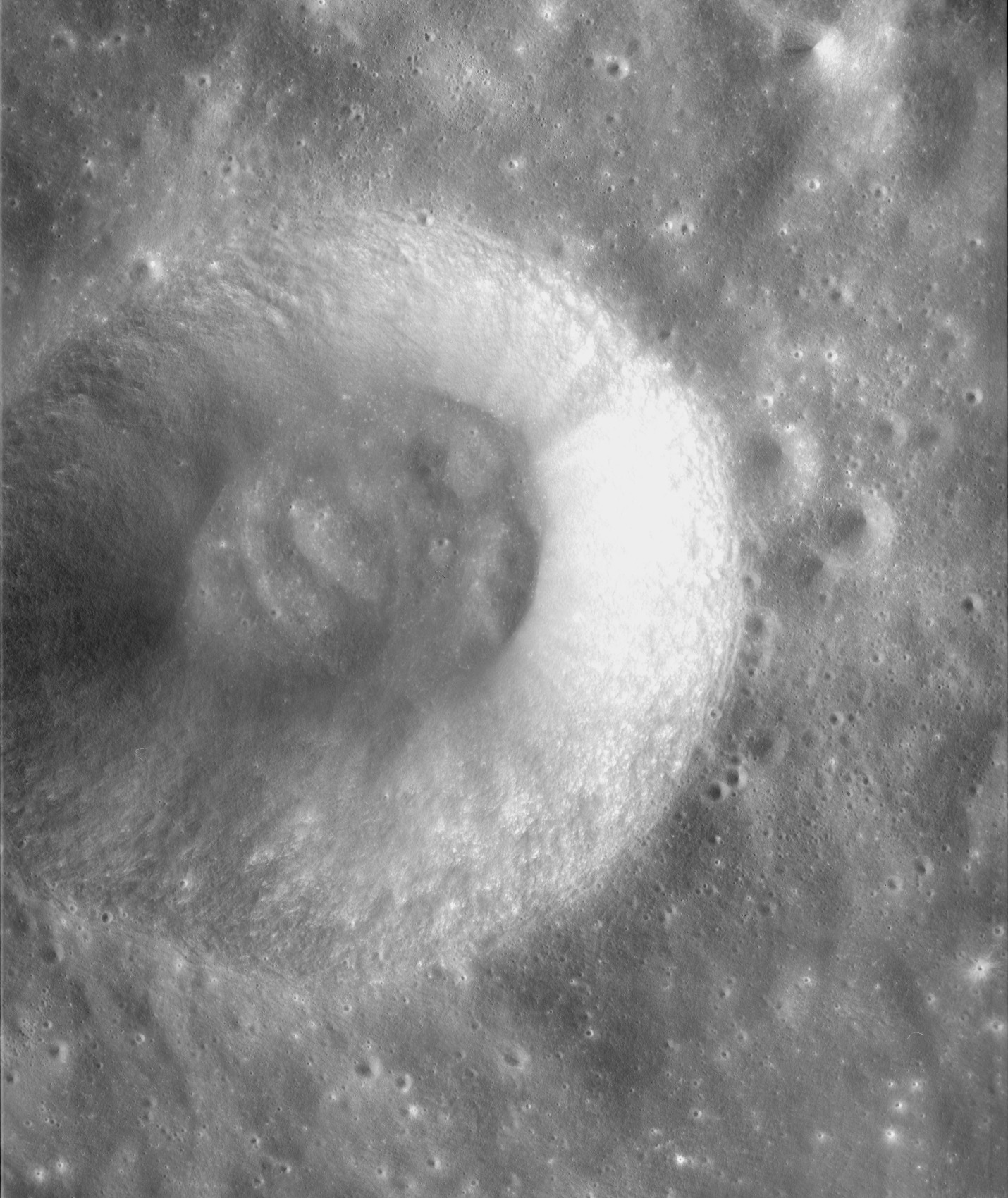
- Apollo 15 panoramic camera image
- Coordinates: 11.1°S 118.0°E
- Diameter: 18 km (11 mi)
- Depth: 1.5 km (0.93 mi)
- Colongitude: 242° at sunrise
- Eponym: Charles S. Sherrington

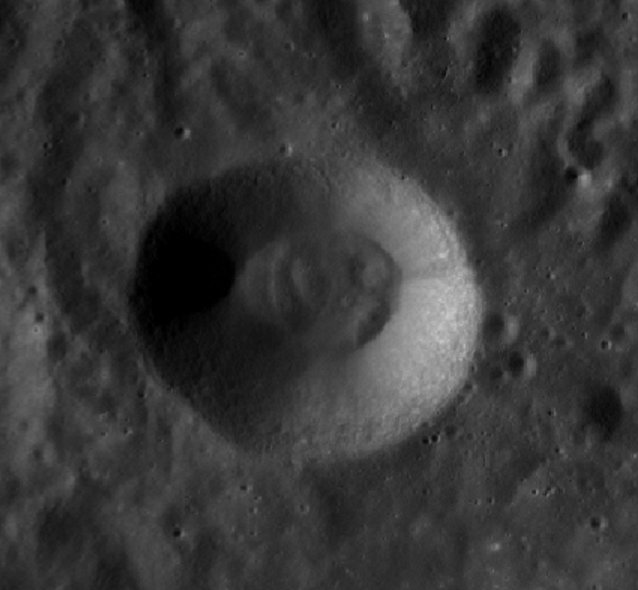
LRO image

Sherrington is a small lunar impact crater that intrudes into the southwest outer rim of the much larger crater Langemak. To the south-southwest is Kondratyuk. Sherrington is located on the Moon's far side and it cannot be viewed directly from the Earth.

The rim of this crater is elongated along the western side, giving it a slight tear-drop shape. The rim is free from significant wear and the inner walls slope down relatively sharply to the interior floor.
