= Dobrovolʹskiy (crater) =

Crater on the Moon

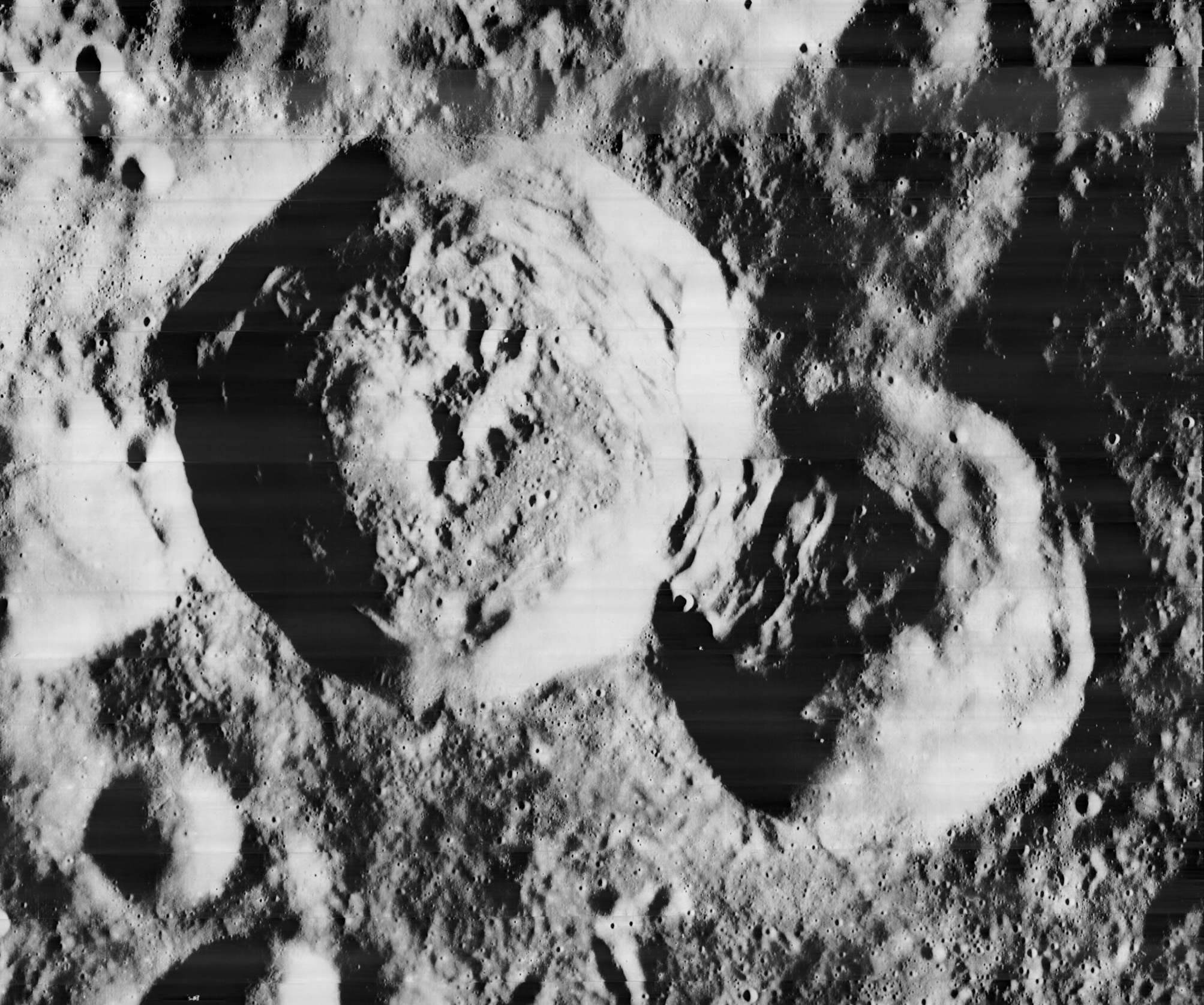
- Lunar Orbiter 1 image of Shirakatsi crater (left) and Dobrovolʹskiy crater (right)
- Coordinates: 12.83°S 129.68°E
- Diameter: 38.4 km (23.9 mi)
- Depth: 3.8 km (2.4 mi)
- Colongitude: 231° at sunrise
- Eponym: Georgiy T. Dobrovolʹskiy

Dobrovolʹskiy is a small lunar impact crater on the Moon's far side. The northwest part of its rim is intruded upon by the somewhat larger crater Shirakatsi, and the outer rampart of that feature covers most of the interior floor of Dobrovolʹskiy. Very little of the original floor now survives, with a small section near the southern inner wall. The remainder of the crater rim is somewhat circular and only mildly worn.

To the north the southern rim of the much larger crater Perepelkin is intruded upon by Shirakatsi, and the three form a brief, curving crater chain. To the southeast of Dobrovolʹskiy is the crater Volkov.

This crater is named after Soviet cosmonaut Georgiy T. Dobrovolskiy (1928-1971), who died during the Soyuz 11 mission. Its designation was officially adopted by the International Astronomical Union in 1973.

== Satellite craters ==
By convention these features are identified on lunar maps by placing the letter on the side of the crater midpoint that is closest to Dobrovolʹskiy.

Dobrovolʹskiy	Latitude	Longitude	Diameter
D	12.2° S	130.6° E	49 km
M	14.6° S	129.6° E	31 km
R	14.0° S	127.7° E	24 km

== Views ==
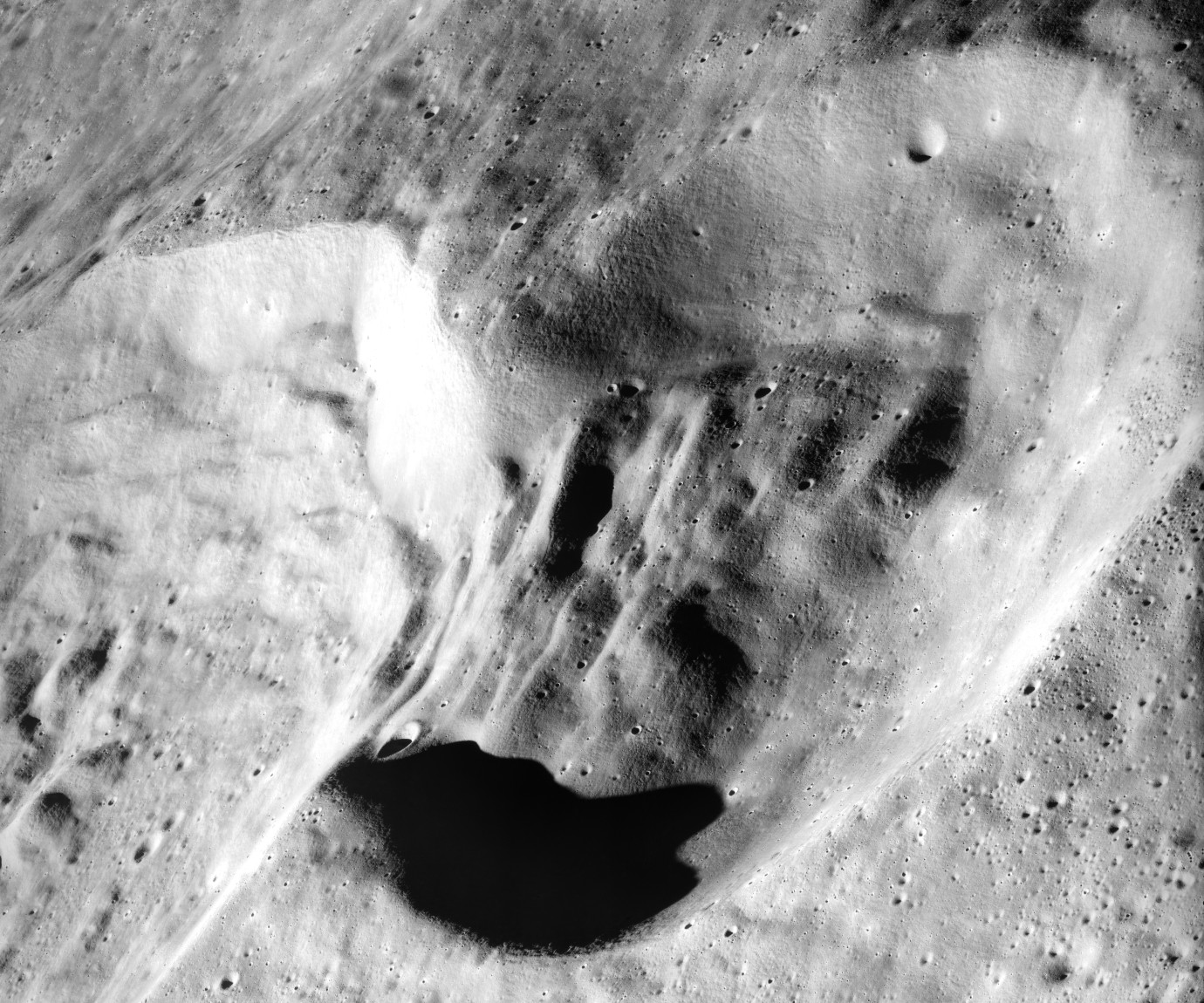
Oblique view of the collapsed wall between the craters (Apollo 17 panoramic camera)

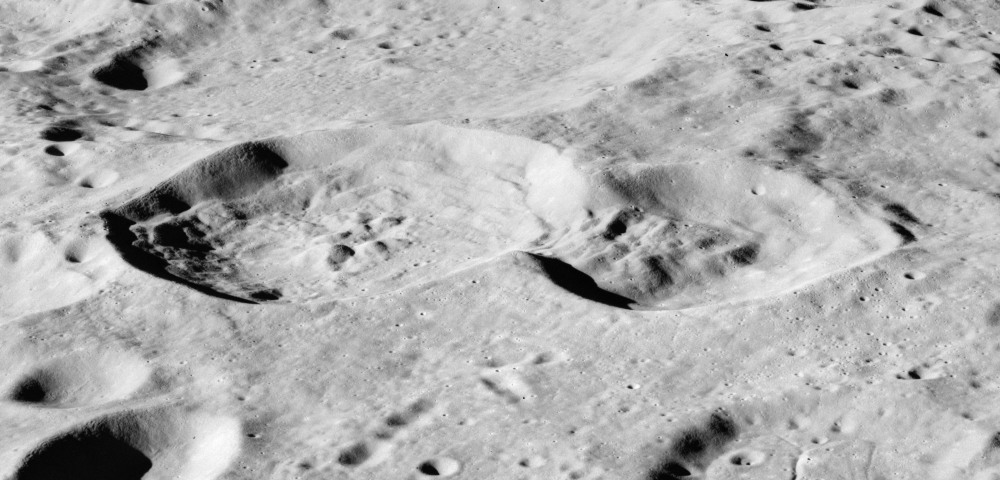
Oblique Apollo 15 Mapping camera image

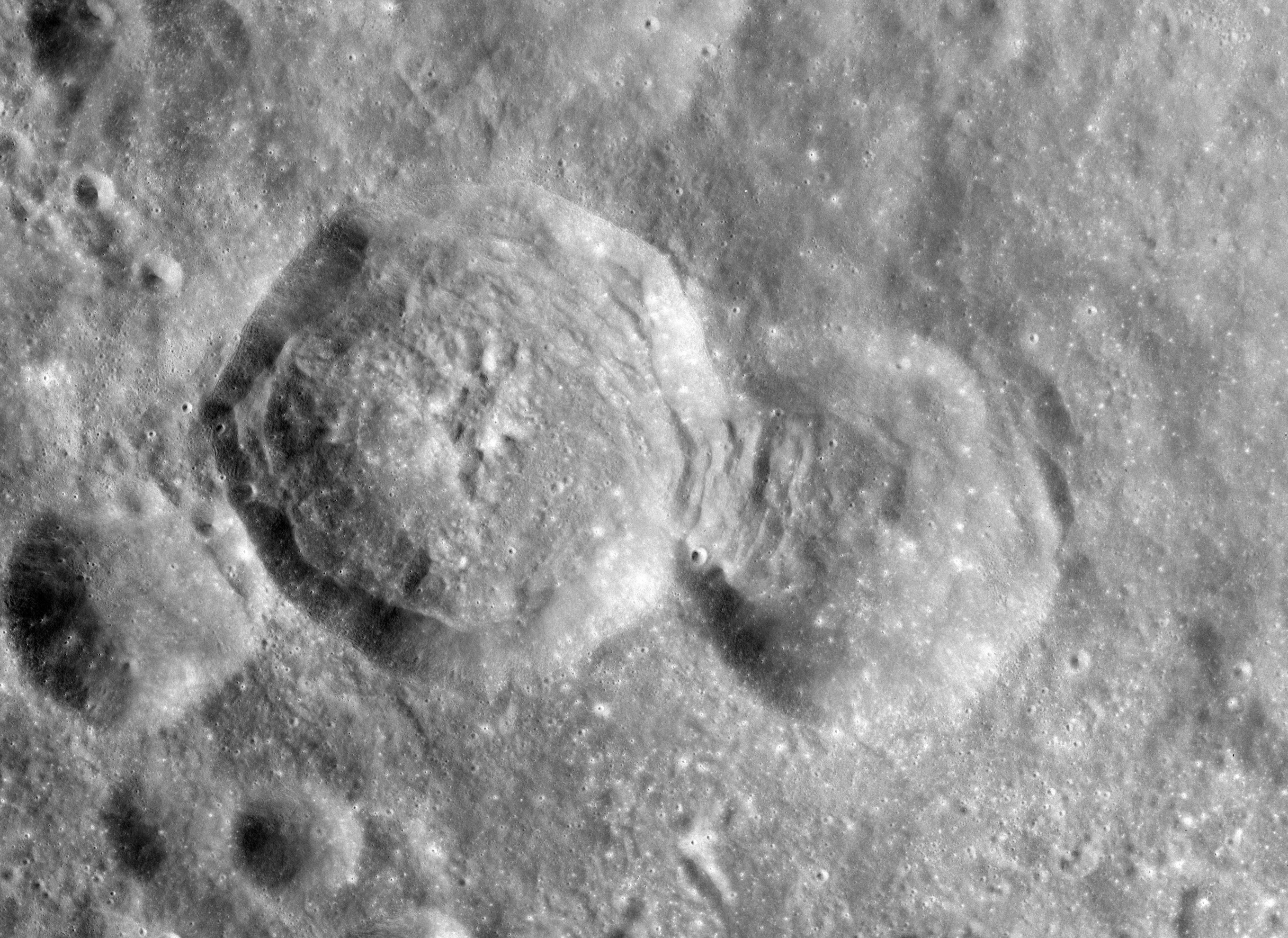
Apollo 17 Mapping camera image
