= D'Arsonval (crater) =

Lunar crater

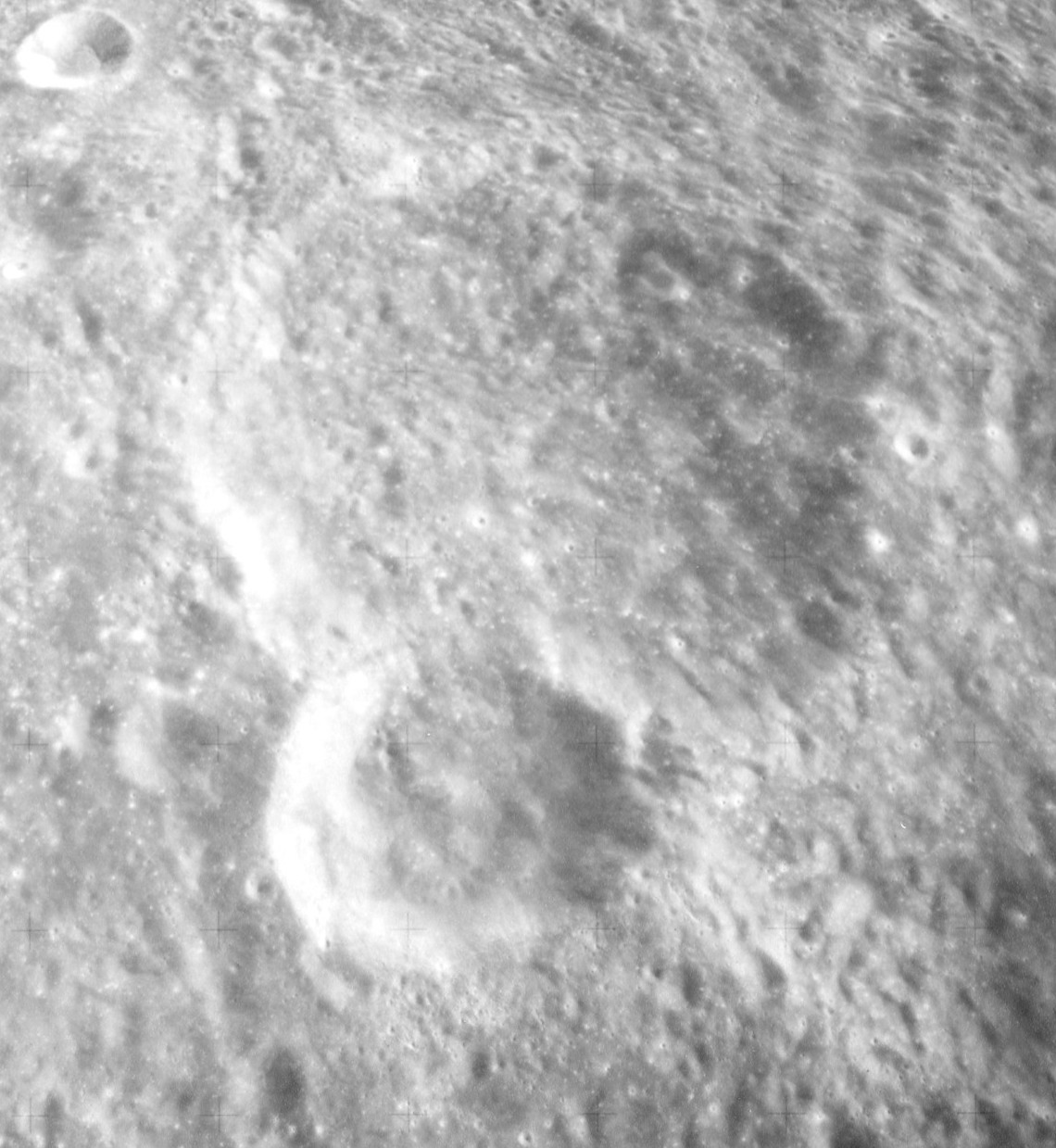
- Oblique Apollo 17 Mapping Camera image of Danjon crater (larger) and D'Arsonval crater (below center), facing south
- Coordinates: 10.31°S 124.59°E
- Diameter: 30.36 km (18.86 mi)
- Depth: 4.0 km (2.5 mi)
- Colongitude: 236° at sunrise
- Eponym: Jacques A. d'Arsonval

D'Arsonval is a small lunar impact crater on the far side of the Moon. It is situated across the northeastern rim of the older and larger crater Danjon. To the east of D'Arsonval is Perepelkin.

The rim of D'Arsonval is moderately worn and it has a low, elongated central ridge near the midpoint. The rim forms a saddle depression where it is joined with Danjon to the southwest. There is a cleft in the lunar surface beginning just to the east of the outer rim and running northward.

The crater was named after French physicist Jacques A. d'Arsonval (1851-1940). Its designation was officially adopted by the International Astronomical Union in 1976.

== Satellite craters ==
By convention these features are identified on lunar maps by placing the letter on the side of the crater midpoint that is closest to D'Arsonval.

D'Arsonval	Latitude	Longitude	Diameter
A	8.4° S	125.0° E	17 km
