= Lander (crater) =

Crater on the Moon

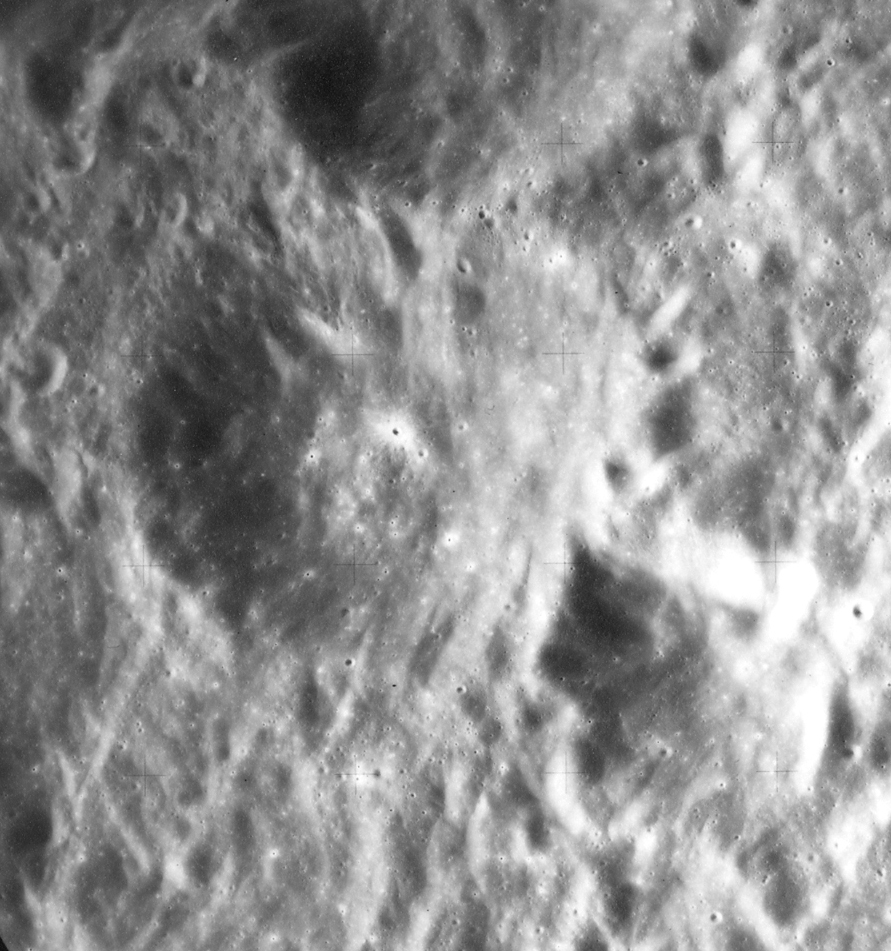
- Apollo 15 Mapping Camera image
- Coordinates: 15.34°S 131.81°E
- Diameter: 40.05 km (24.89 mi)
- Depth: 3.0 km
- Colongitude: 229° at sunrise
- Eponym: Richard L. Lander

Lander is a lunar impact crater that is located just to the north-northeast of the prominent Tsiolkovskiy, on the far side of the Moon. It was named by the IAU in 1976 for the British explorer Richard Lander.

Attached to the northeastern rim of Lander is Volkov J, which is joined with Volkov to the north. Just to the southeast of Lander is Patsaev. Lander cannot be seen directly from the Earth, and must be observed from orbit. This is a worn and eroded crater formation, with features that have become poorly defined and softened due to subsequent impacts and possibly some overlap of ejecta from Tsiolkovskiy and other sources. The inner rim is wider and has a gentler slope along the eastern side. The interior floor is relatively level, but contains some low rises.

== Satellite craters ==
By convention these features are identified on lunar maps by placing the letter on the side of the crater midpoint that is closest to Lander.

| Lander | Latitude | Longitude | Diameter |
|---|---|---|---|
| K | 16.2° S | 132.2° E | 23 km |
