= Claude (surname) =

Claude is a surname. It may refer to:

- Albert Claude (1899–1983), a Belgian Nobel Prize in Medicine recipient
- Bonivert Claude (born 1945), a former Bank of Haïti governor
- Catherine Claude (1924–2000), French writer, literary critic and Resistance member
- Desmond Claude (born 2003), American basketball player
- Fabien Claude (born 1994), French biathlete
- François Auguste Claude (1858–1938), French astronomer
- Georges Claude (1870–1960), a French engineer, chemist and inventor
- Jean Claude (1619–1687), a French Protestant theologian
- Marcel Claude (born 1957), a Chilean economist, politician, and candidate for President of his country
- Renée Claude (1939–2020), a Canadian actress and singer

== See also ==
- Claude (given name)
