= Volkov (crater) =

Crater on the Moon

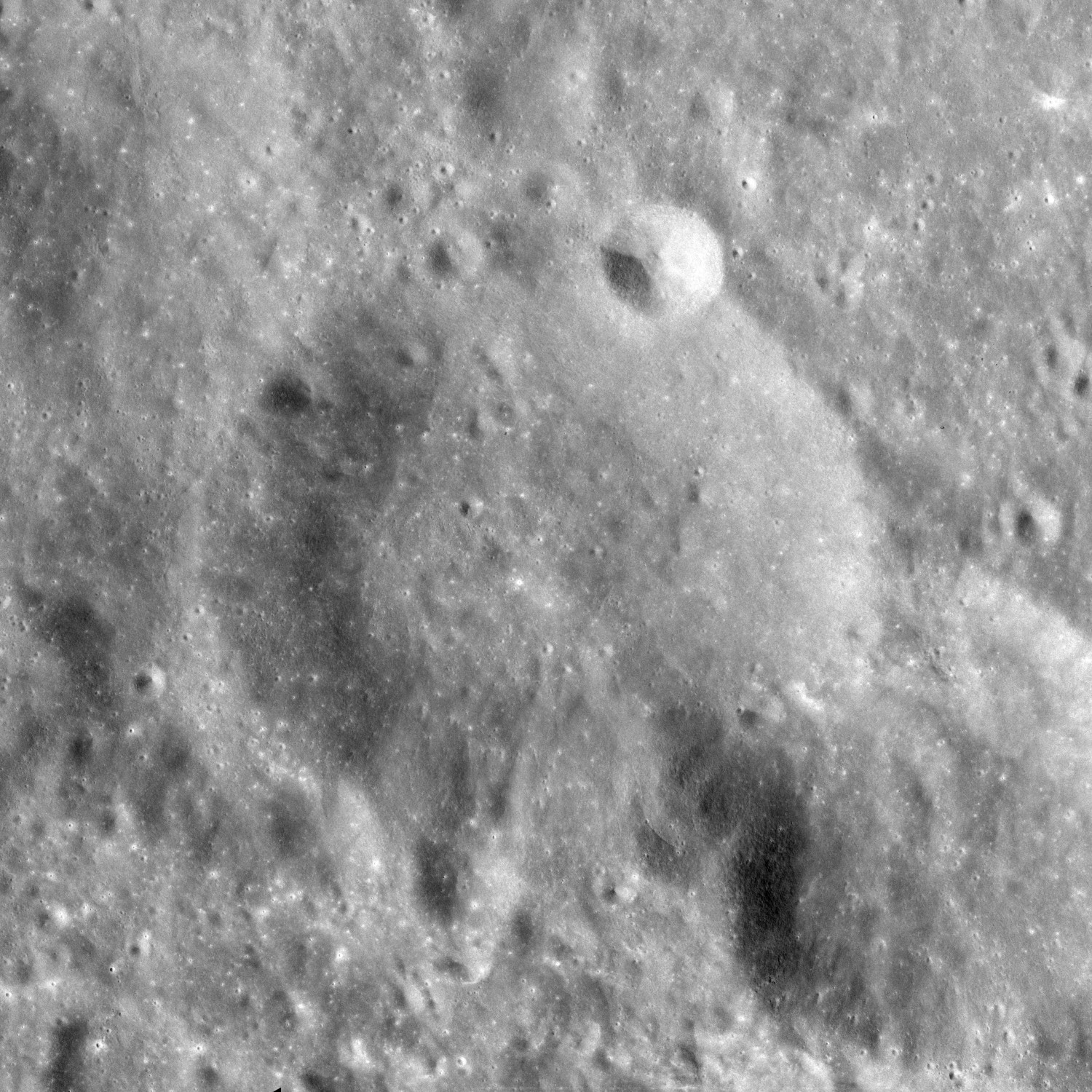
- Apollo 17 image
- Coordinates: 13.62°S 131.67°E
- Diameter: 40.84 km (25.38 mi)
- Depth: 2 km (1.2 mi)
- Colongitude: 229° at sunrise
- Eponym: Vladislav N. Volkov

Volkov is a lunar impact crater on the Moon's far side. It is located to the north of the prominent crater Tsiolkovskiy, and east-southeast of Dobrovol'skiy. Overlying the southeastern rim of Volkov is the satellite crater Volkov J, and the two have merged to form a figure-8 shape. The crater Lander is attached to the southwest rim of Volkov J, making this a triple-crater formation.

The outer rim of Volkov is moderately eroded, with a small crater across the northeast rim and a gap in the southeast where it joins Volkov J. The inner walls are relatively featureless, with a few tiny craterlets marking the surface. The interior floor of the crater is lumpy, with low hills and a few tiny craterlets.

It is named after Russian–Soviet cosmonaut Vladislav Volkov, who died in Soyuz 11 mission on 30 June 1971 during the vehicle's return to the Earth. The name was approved by the IAU in 1973.

== Satellite craters ==
By convention these features are identified on lunar maps by placing the letter on the side of the crater midpoint that is closest to Volkov.

| Volkov | Latitude | Longitude | Diameter |
|---|---|---|---|
| F | 13.5° S | 134.0° E | 10 km |
| J | 14.4° S | 132.4° E | 32 km |

The name Heine was proposed for Volkov J crater, but this was rejected by the IAU. The name was eventually used for a crater on Mercury in 1979.

== See also ==
- 1790 Volkov, minor planet
