= Shirakatsi (crater) =

Crater on the Moon

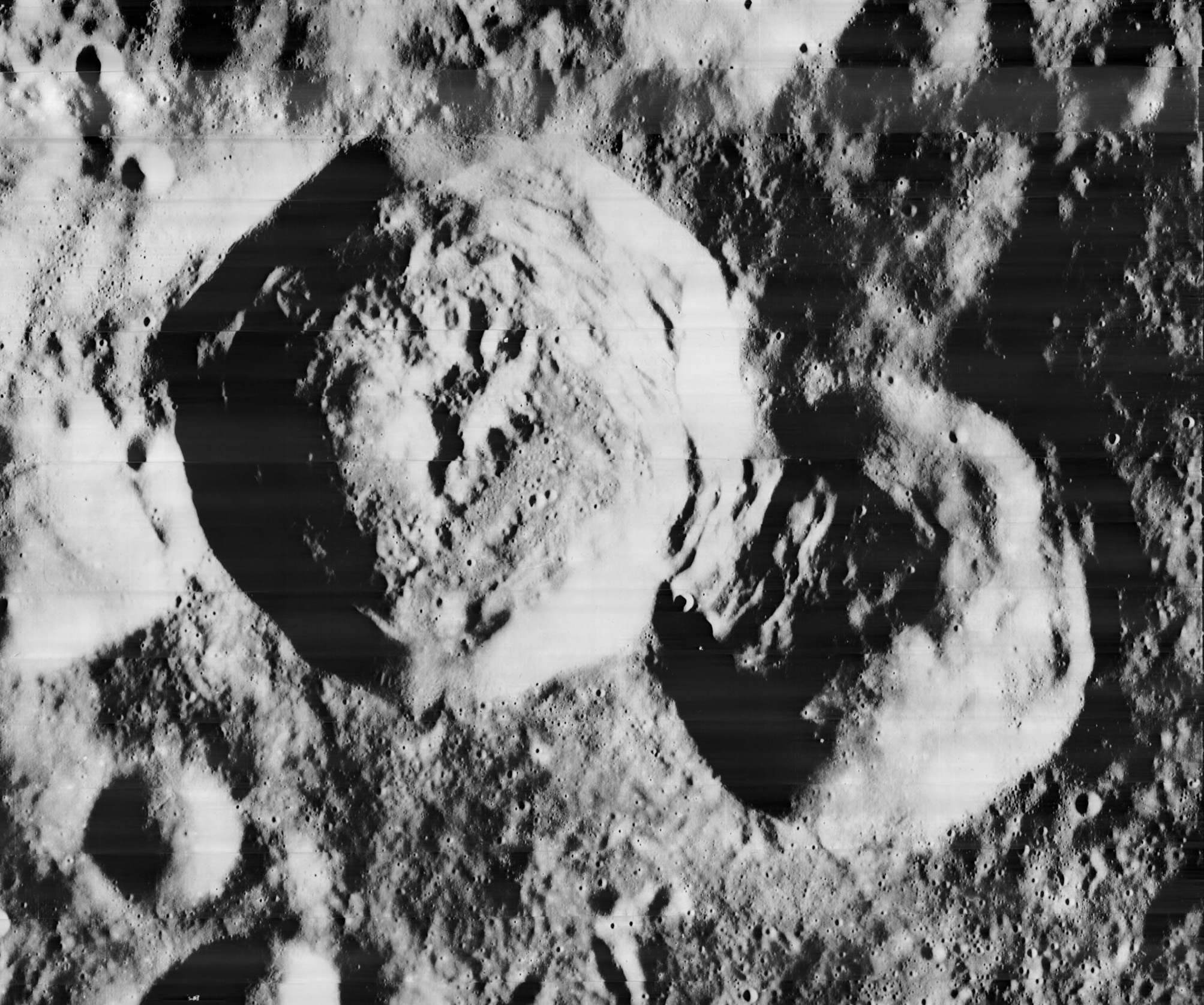
- Lunar Orbiter 1 image of Shirakatsi crater (left) and Dobrovol'skiy crater (right)
- Coordinates: 12.18°S 128.56°E
- Diameter: 48.13 km (29.91 mi)
- Depth: 4.2 km (2.6 mi)
- Colongitude: 231° at sunrise
- Eponym: Anania Shirakatsi

Shirakatsi is an impact crater that is located on the Moon's far side. It is attached to the southern exterior rim of the larger crater Perepelkin, and overlies the northwestern rim of Dobrovol'skiy.

This is a relatively fresh crater that has not been significantly eroded by subsequent impacts. The rim edge is well-defined, and there are some terrace structures along parts of the inner wall. The interior floor is uneven, particularly in the north, where it is covered by a complex of ridges. The only level section of floor is along the southern inner wall. The infrared spectrum of pure crystalline plagioclase has been identified on the central peak. The outer rampart of Shirakatsi has formed a mound of debris in the northwestern half of Dobrovol'skiy's interior.

In 1979, the crater was named after Armenian geographer Anania Shirakatsi.

== Views ==
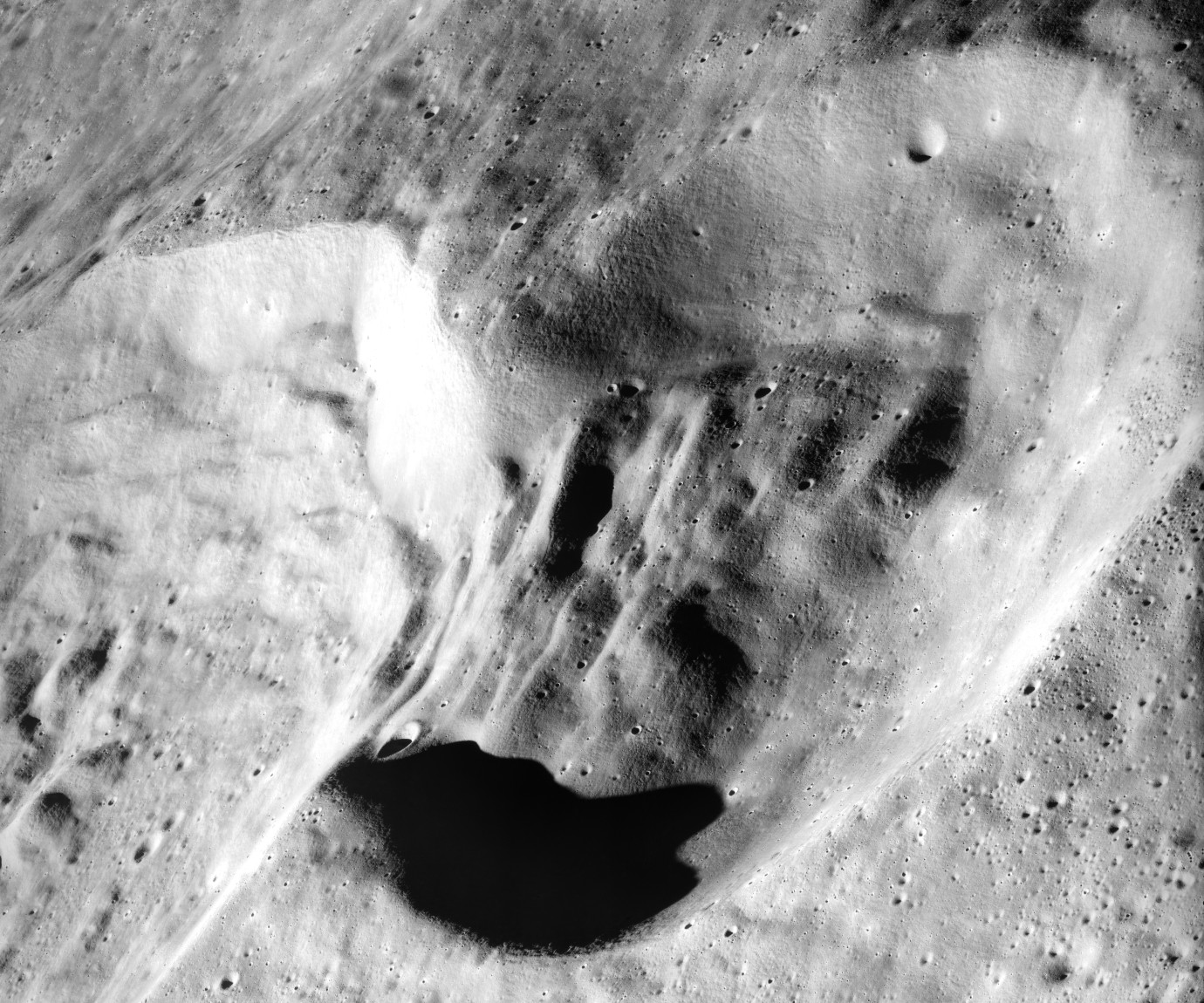
Oblique view of the collapsed wall between the craters (Apollo 17 panoramic camera)

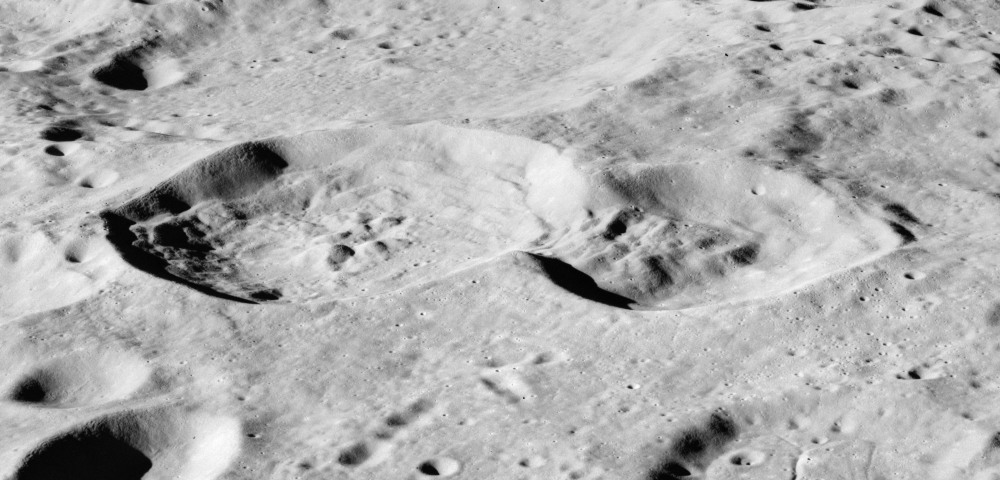
Oblique Apollo 15 Mapping camera image

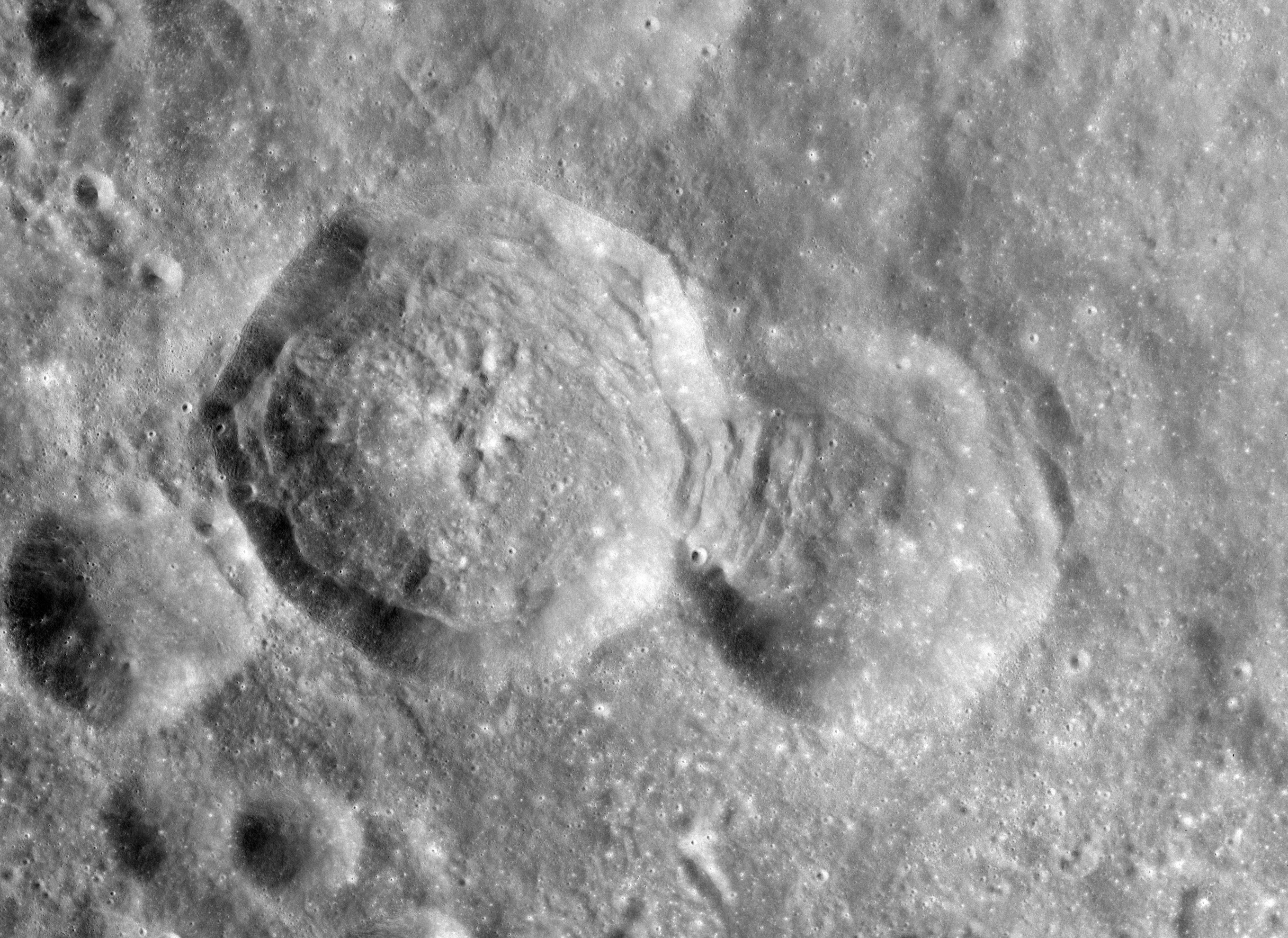
Apollo 17 Mapping camera image
