= Georgy Langemak =

Soviet rocket scientist (1898–1938)

- Георгий Лангемак
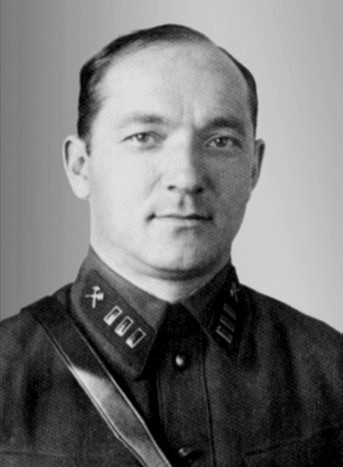
- Langemak in 1935
- Born: Georgy Erikhovich Langemak; 20 July 1898; Starobilsk, Kharkov Governorate, Russian Empire
- Died: 11 January 1938 (aged 39); Moscow, Russian SFSR, Soviet Union
- Military career
- Allegiance: Russian Empire; Russian SFSR; Soviet Union
- Branch: Imperial Russian Army; Soviet Red Army; Soviet Ground Forces
- Service years: 1916–1938
- Rank: military engineer 1st rank (1935-1938)
- Awards: Hero of the Socialist Labour

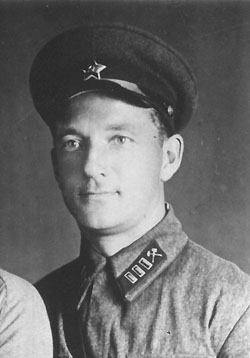
Langemak in 1935–1936

Georgy Erikhovich Langemak (Note: Russian: Георгий Эрихович Лангемак; Ukrainian: Георгій Еріхович Лангемак.) (8 July [O.S. 26 June] 1898 – 11 January 1938) was a Soviet engineer, working on rocket design applications. He is chiefly remembered for being the co-designer and directing the development of the aircraft unguided rockets, such as the RS-82 and RS-132, which were modified to be used with such success in the Katyusha rocket launchers of World War II. The crater Langemak on the Moon is named in his honor.

== Life ==
Beginning in 1928, he worked at the Soviet Gas Dynamics Laboratory along with several other notable Soviet rocket scientists, and they developed rocket projectiles that used smokeless powder. This group was later merged with another rocketry organization to become the Reactive Scientific Research Institute (RNII). Langemak became the deputy director of the RNII. In 1936 this group completed the technical specifications for a rocket-glider.

In 1937 during the Great Purge, he was fired and subsequently arrested by NKVD, along with RNII director Ivan Kleymyonov and engine designer Valentin Glushko, as a follow-up to a denunciation letter by the director of RNII liquid fuel engine laboratory, Andrei Kostikov (who subsequently took his position in the institute), in which he claimed Langemak was sabotaging the research and development progress of the new engine. Langemak was judged by a visiting session of Military Collegium of the Supreme Court of the Soviet Union on 11 January 1938, found guilty under the article 58-7, 58-8, and 58-11, and sentenced to death by shooting with property confiscation. The execution took place the same day.

== Exoneration ==
He was rehabilitated completely in November 1955.

Langemak and other participants in the creation of the Katyusha rocket launcher received official recognition only in 1991. By decree of President Mikhail Gorbachev, dated 21 June 1991, Kleymyonov, Langemak, Vasily Luzhin, Boris Petropavlovsky, Boris Slonimer, and Nikolai Tikhomirov were posthumously awarded the title of Hero of Socialist Labor.

== Bibliography ==
- Langemak, G. E. and Glushko, V. P., "The Missile, Its Device and Use", 1935.
- Лангемак Георгий Эрихович, Автор Александр Глушко. На основании документов из архивов ЦГАВМФ, ФСБ, Самарского филиала РГАНТД и личного архива А. В. Глушко.
