= Meitner (lunar crater) =

Crater on the Moon

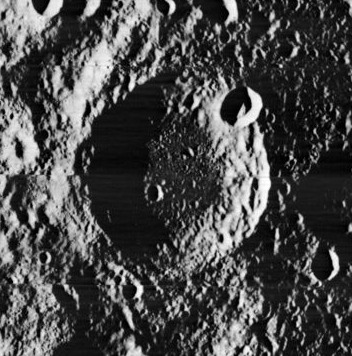
- Lunar Orbiter 2 image
- Coordinates: 10.5°S 112.7°E
- Diameter: 87 km
- Depth: Unknown
- Colongitude: 248° at sunrise
- Eponym: Lise Meitner

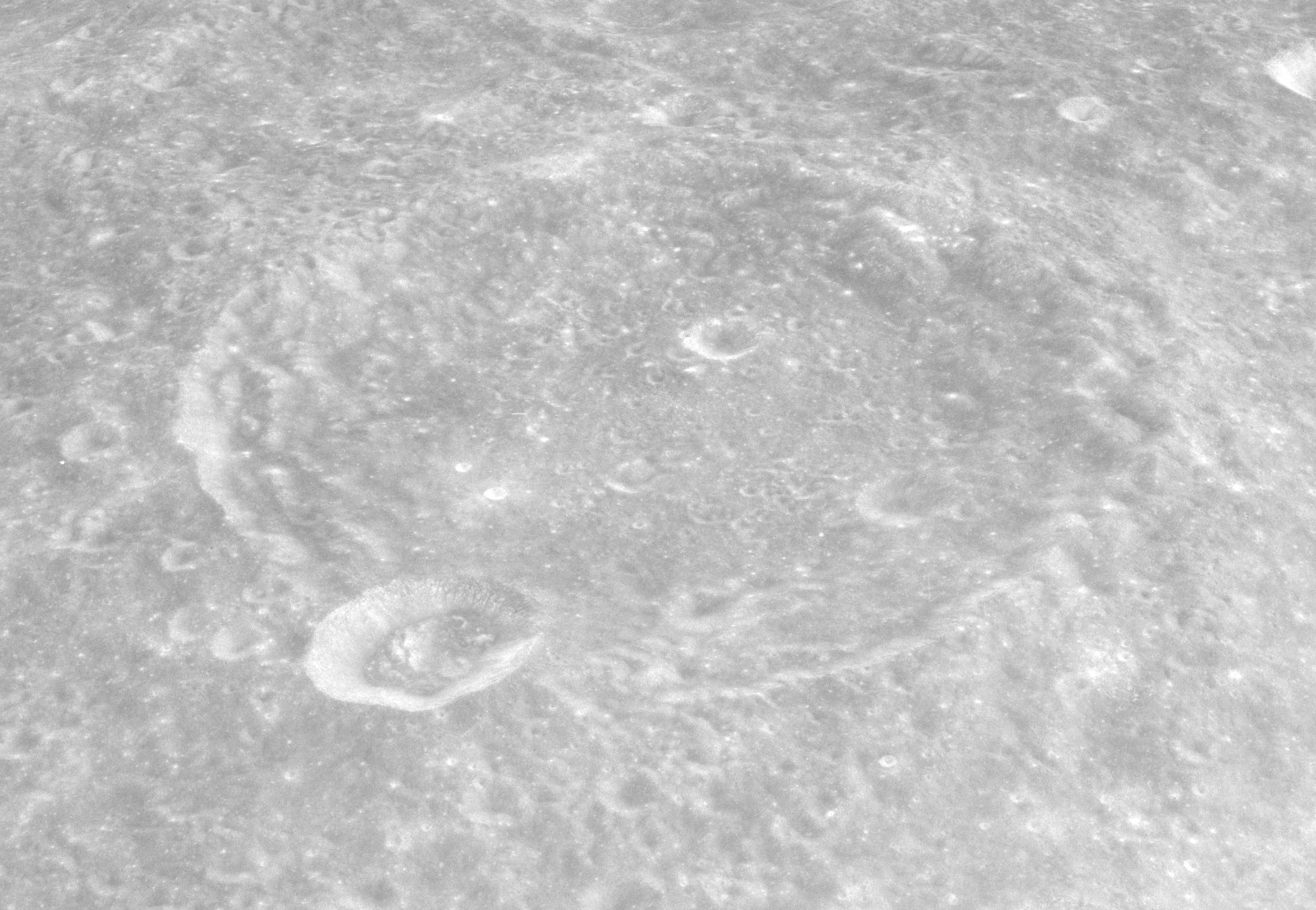
Oblique Apollo 17 Mapping Camera image, facing south

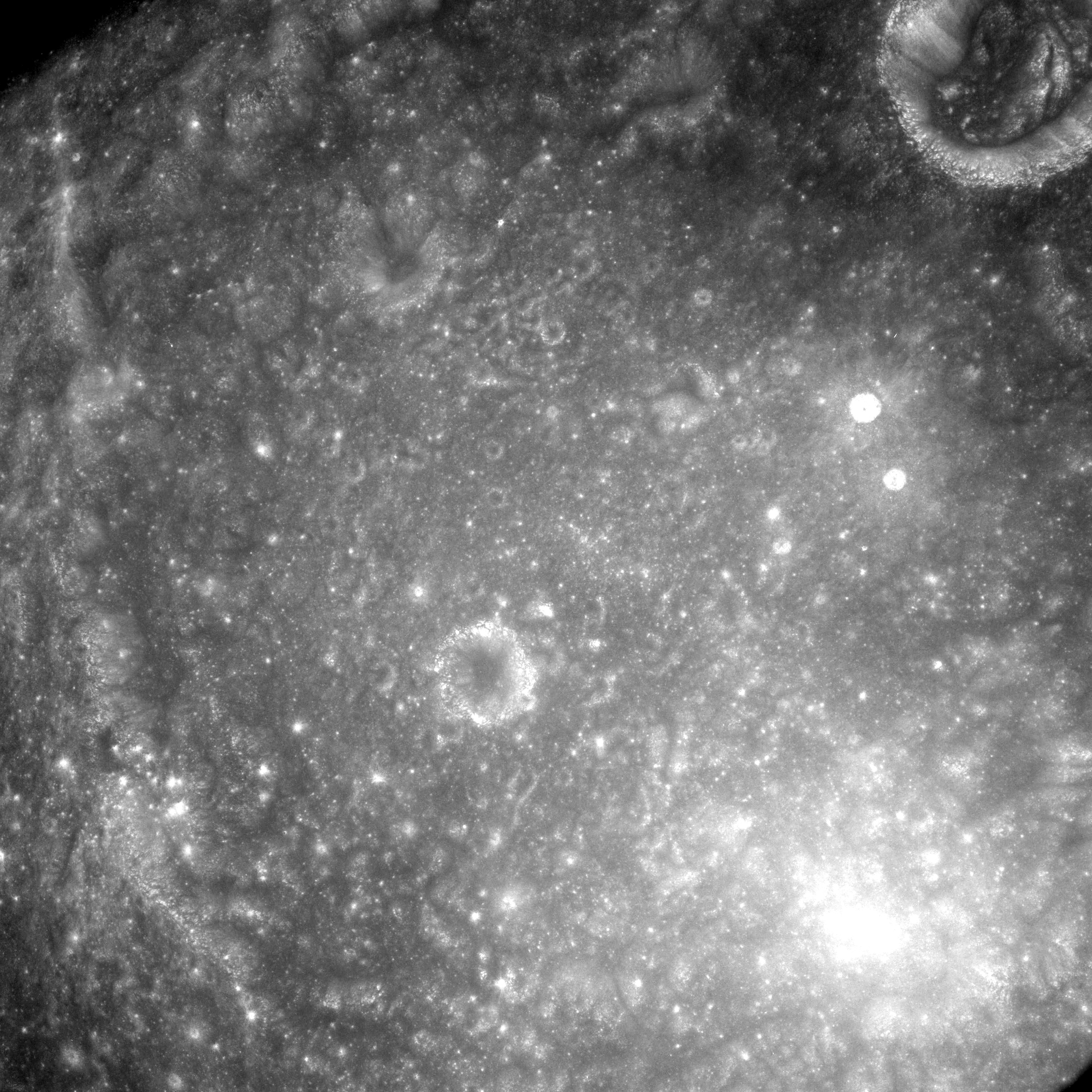
The interior of Meitner from Apollo 8

Meitner is an impact crater on the far side of the Moon, behind the eastern limb. It lies to the northwest of the crater Kondratyuk, and about a crater diameter to the west of Langemak.

This crater has relatively well-defined features that have not been significantly eroded by subsequent impacts. The rim edge is roughly circular, with a slight outward bulge along the southern edge. The small satellite crater Meitner C lies across the rim and inner wall to the northeast. Sections of the inner wall display terrace features. The interior floor of Meitner is relatively level, with a small craterlet just to the southwest of the midpoint and another along the northwest inner wall.

Apollo 8, the first crewed mission to orbit the Moon, happened to fly directly over Meitner (among many other craters) and obtained high-resolution photographs of the interior.

Prior to formal naming by the IAU in 1970, Meitner was called Crater 276.

== Satellite craters ==
By convention these features are identified on lunar maps by placing the letter on the side of the crater midpoint that is closest to Meitner.

Meitner	Latitude	Longitude	Diameter
A	8.1° S	113.5° E	17 km
C	9.7° S	113.7° E	19 km
H	11.9° S	116.0° E	13 km
J	12.1° S	115.1° E	15 km
R	12.0° S	109.4° E	16 km

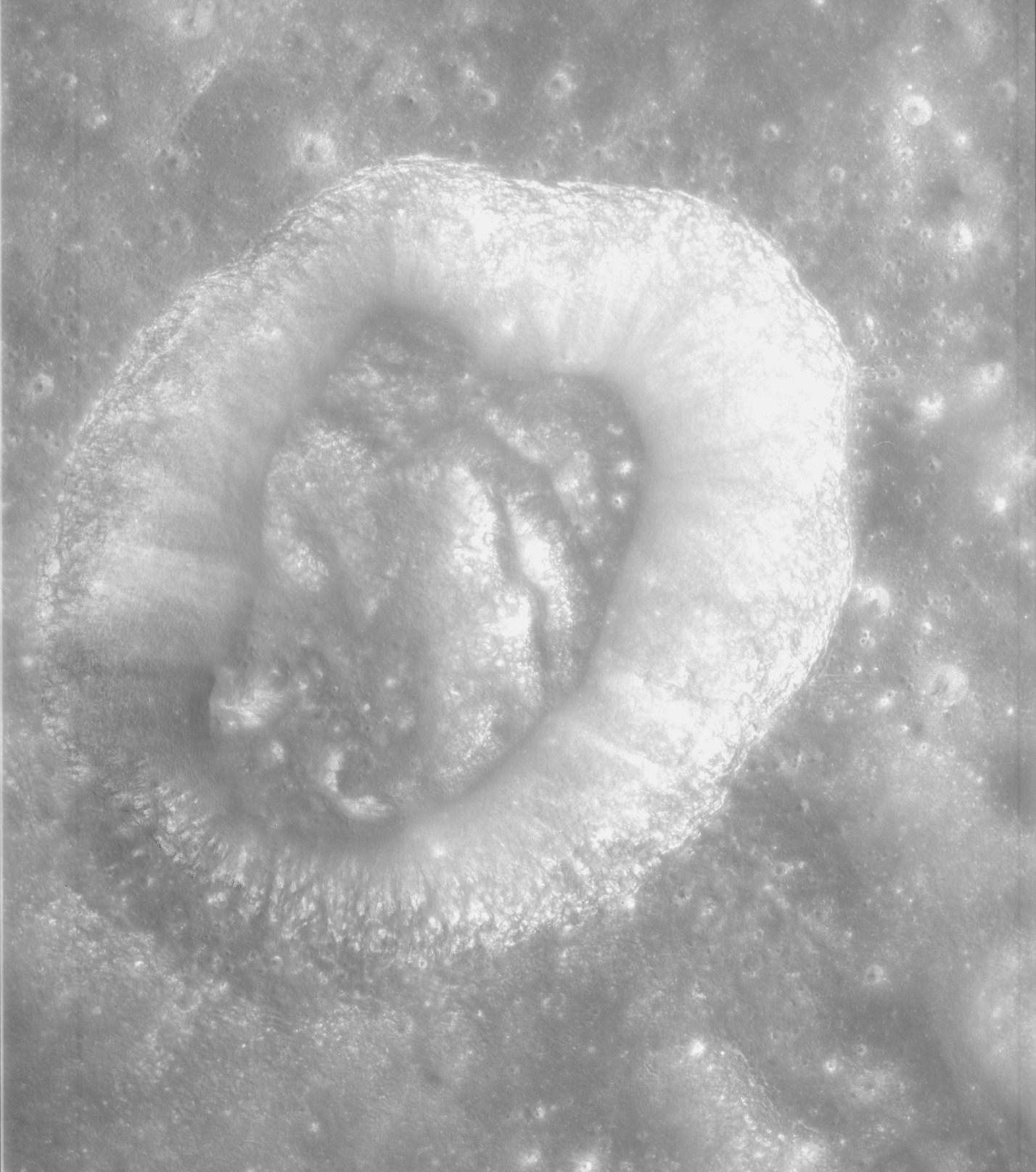
Apollo 15 image of Meitner C
