= Langemak (crater) =

Crater on the Moon

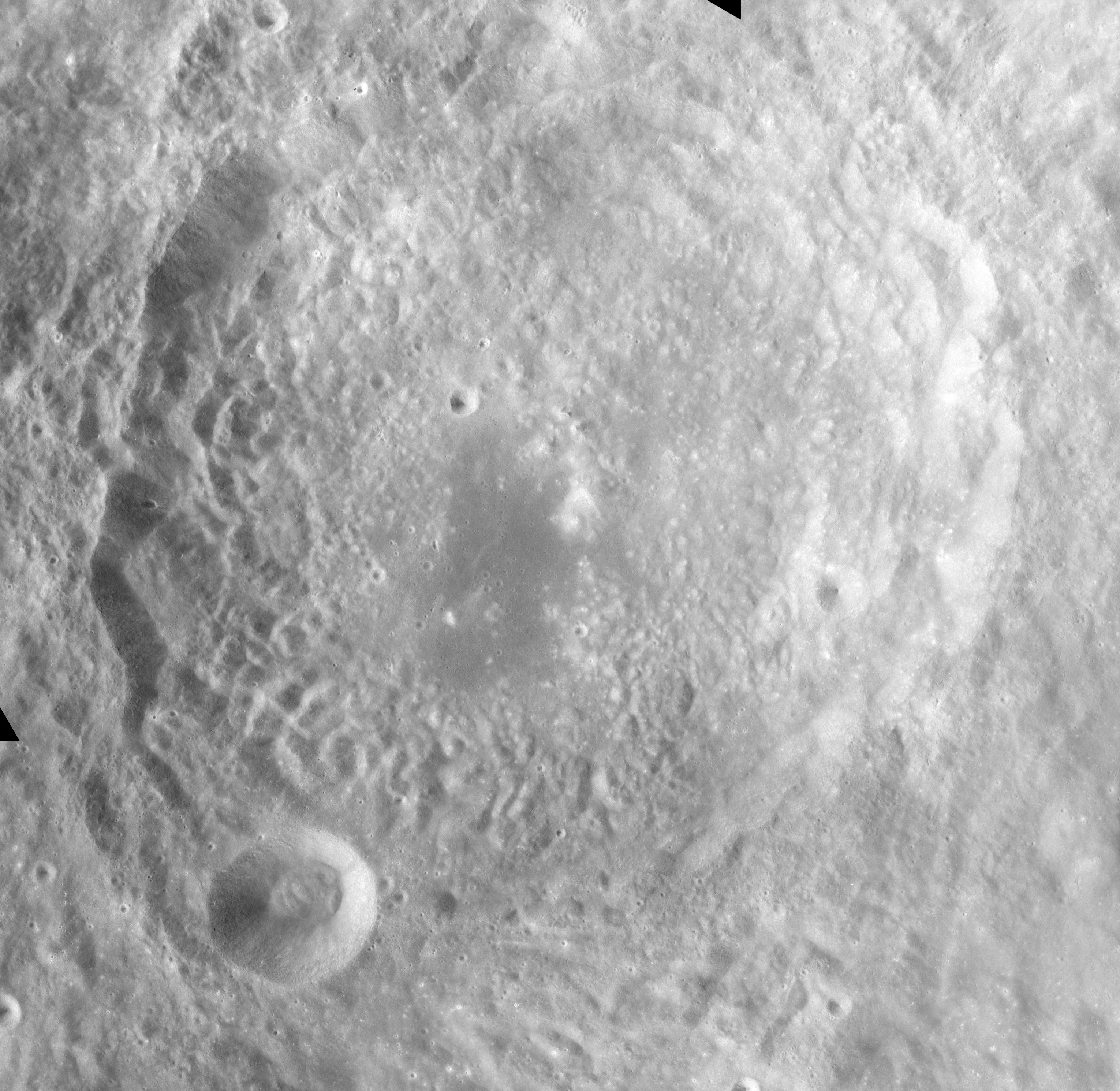
- Apollo 17 image
- Coordinates: 9.93°S 119.45°E
- Diameter: 104.76 km (65.09 mi)
- Depth: 5.0 km (3.1 mi)
- Colongitude: 242° at sunrise
- Eponym: Georgy E. Langemak

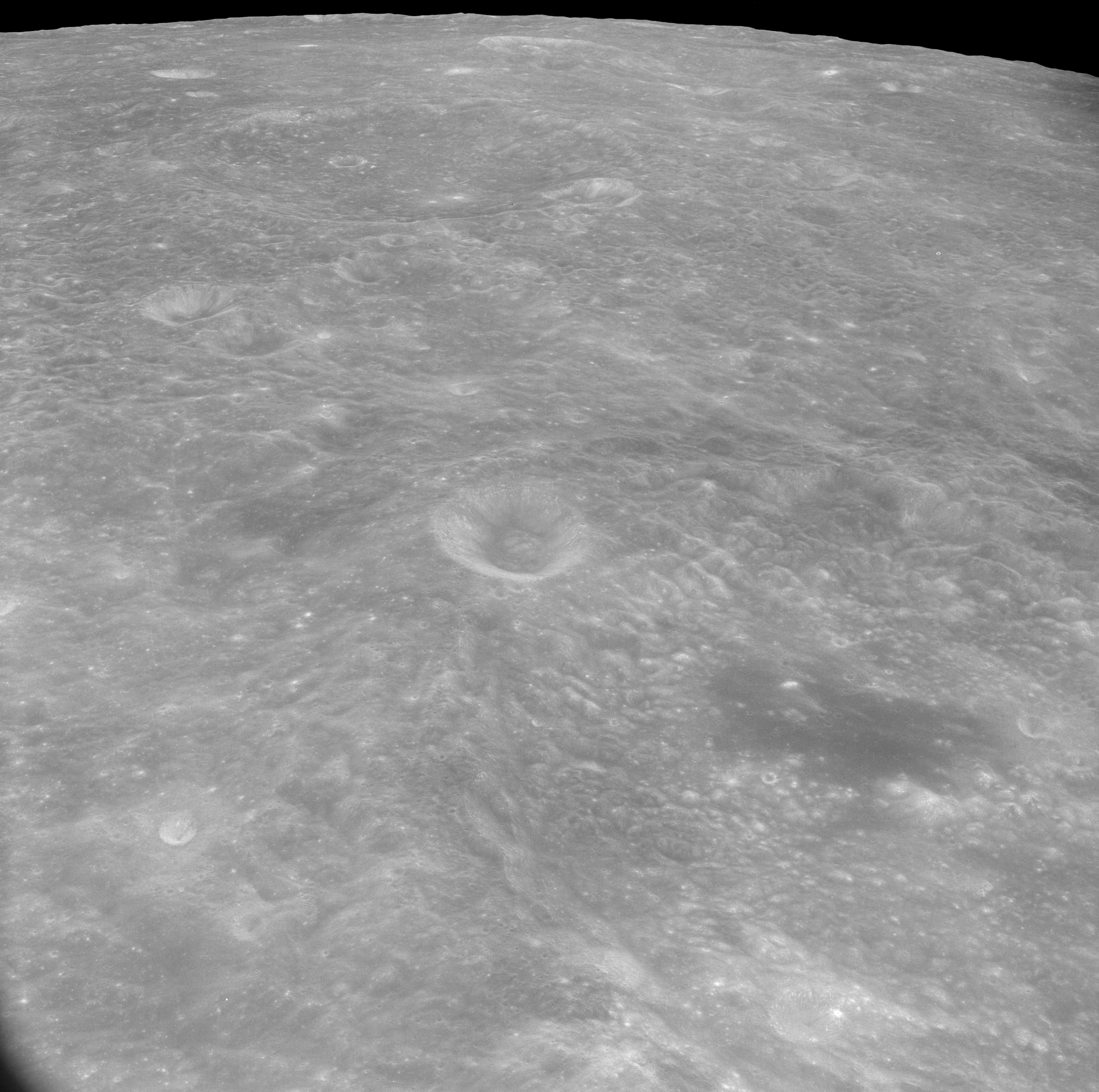
Oblique view of Langemak crater in lower right, with Meitner crater in the background, from Apollo 8

Langemak is a prominent impact crater on the far side of the Moon. It is located less than one crater diameter west-northwest of Danjon, and nearly due east of Meitner. To the southwest of Langemak is Kondratyuk. Langemak partly overlies the larger and older crater Langemak N. This feature is also attached to the northeastern rim of Kondratyuk.

To the northeast of Langemak is the crater Necho. Ray material from this impact lies across the rim and interior of Langemak, particularly along the northwest and eastern halves.

The outer rim of Langemak is relatively fresh and well-defined. The most notable impact along the rim is the small crater Sherrington along the southwestern edge. The remainder of the rim is roughly circular, but irregular with multiple small outward bulges. The inner wall is terraced in places, with the appearance of slumping along parts of the upper edge.

Within the interior is a low, curving central ridge near the midpoint. There is a patch of lower albedo material to the southwest of this ridge, extending to the edge of the inner wall.

Prior to formal naming by the IAU in 1970, Langemak was called Crater 279. Langemak N, to the south of Langemak, was called Crater 280.

The crater is named in honor of Georgy Langemak, a Soviet space program engineer executed during the Great Purge.

== Satellite craters ==
By convention these features are identified on lunar maps by placing the letter on the side of the crater midpoint that is closest to Langemak.

| Langemak | Latitude | Longitude | Diameter |
|---|---|---|---|
| N | 12.9° S | 119.0° E | 126 km |
| X | 6.6° S | 117.5° E | 47 km |
| Z | 5.6° S | 119.3° E | 27 km |
