= Perepelkin (Martian crater) =

Perepelkin Crater
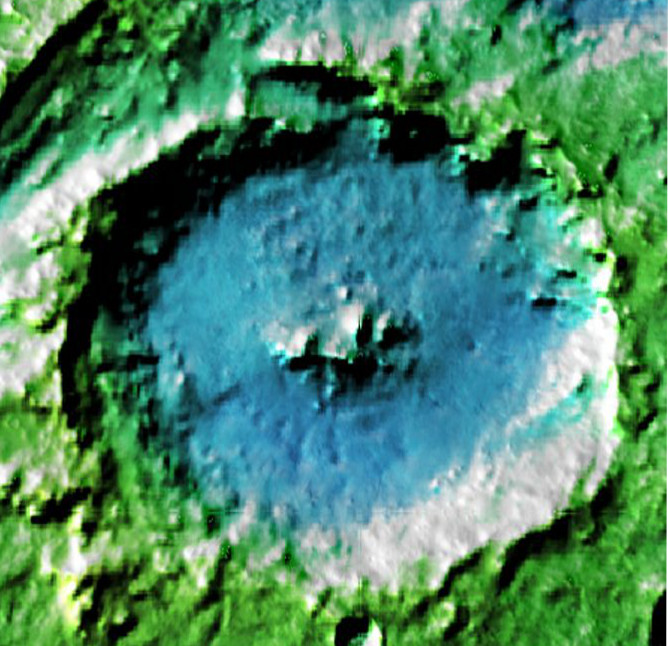
- Topographic image of Perepelkin Crater
- Planet: Mars
- Region: Arcadia quadrangle
- Coordinates: 52.8°N 64.6°W
- Quadrangle: Arcadia
- Diameter: 77 km
- Eponym: Yevgeny Perepyolkin

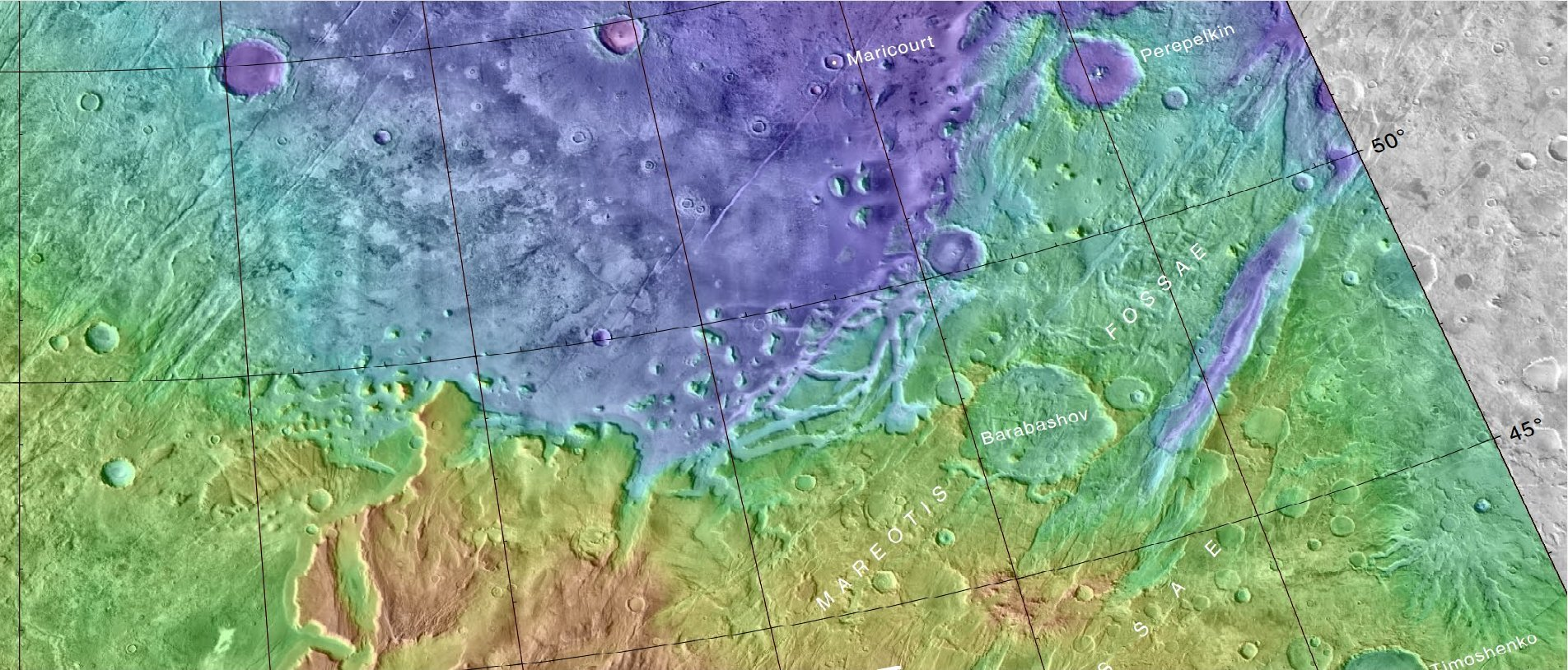
Map of Perepelkin Crater and other nearby craters

Perepelkin Crater is an impact crater in the Arcadia quadrangle of the planet Mars. It is located at 52.8°N latitude and 64.6°W longitude. It is 77 km in diameter. It was named after Russian astronomer Yevgeny Perepyolkin.

== Description ==
Much of the crater is covered with a mantle that is believed to be ice-rich and to have fallen from the atmosphere when the climate was different. In one of the images below mantle can be seen; also some places when the mantle has disappeared, channels are visible.

=== Mantle ===
Researchers have noticed a smooth mantle covering much of Mars. Some parts are eroded revealing rough surfaces while others possess layers. It's generally accepted that mantle is ice-rich dust that fell from the sky as snow and ice-coated dust grains during a different climate One evidence of its ice-rich nature is the presence of gullies which form when some of the ice melts. Only a few hours of flow can result in erosion . In higher latitudes, such as around Milankovic Crater, the mantle is thicker and may contain rounded shapes called scallops . These are thought to be caused by the sublimation of ice in the mantle. Several models have been advanced to explain them; some include a small amount of melting at times.

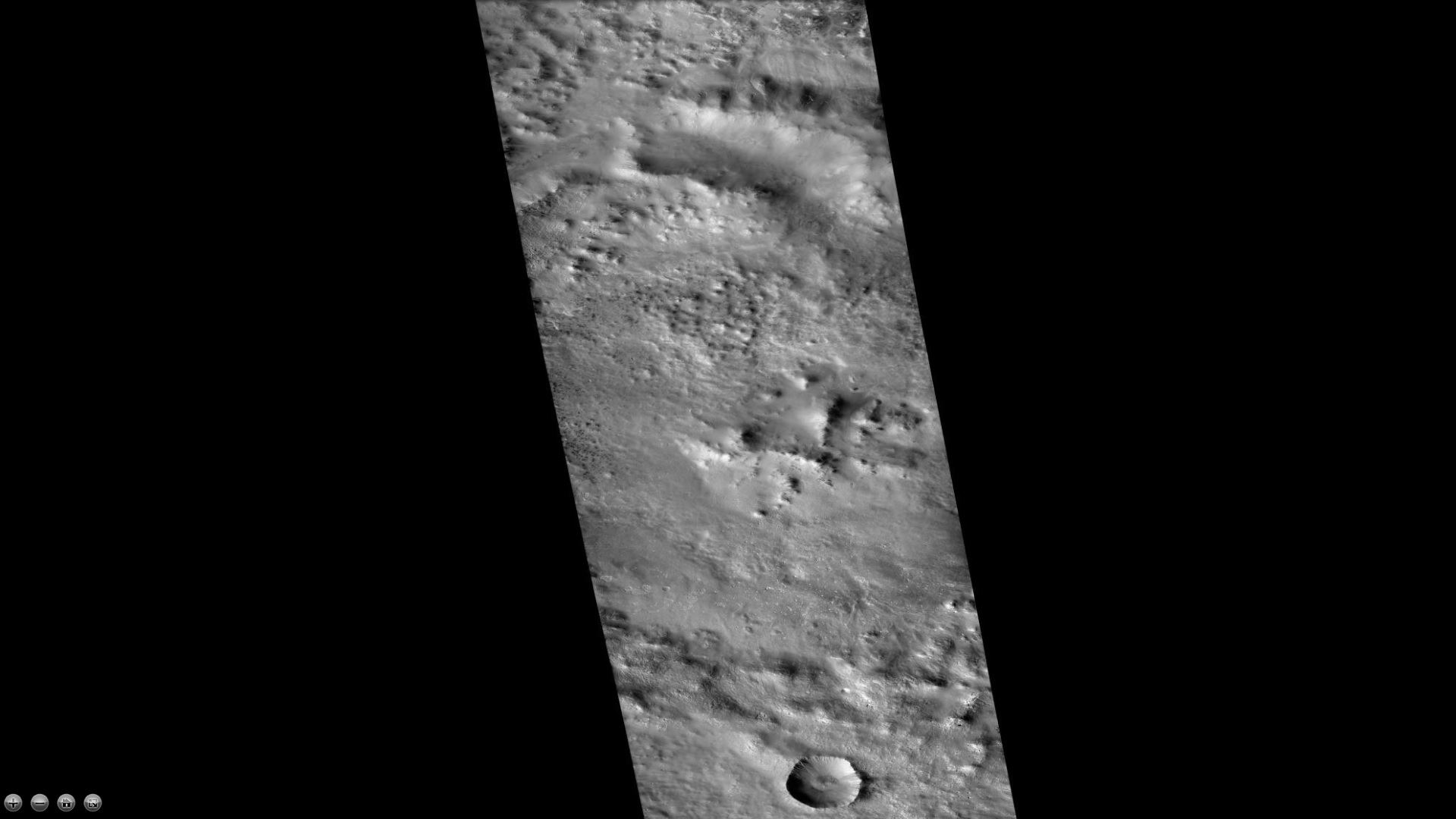
Perepelkin Crater, as seen by CTX camera (on Mars Reconnaissance Orbiter).

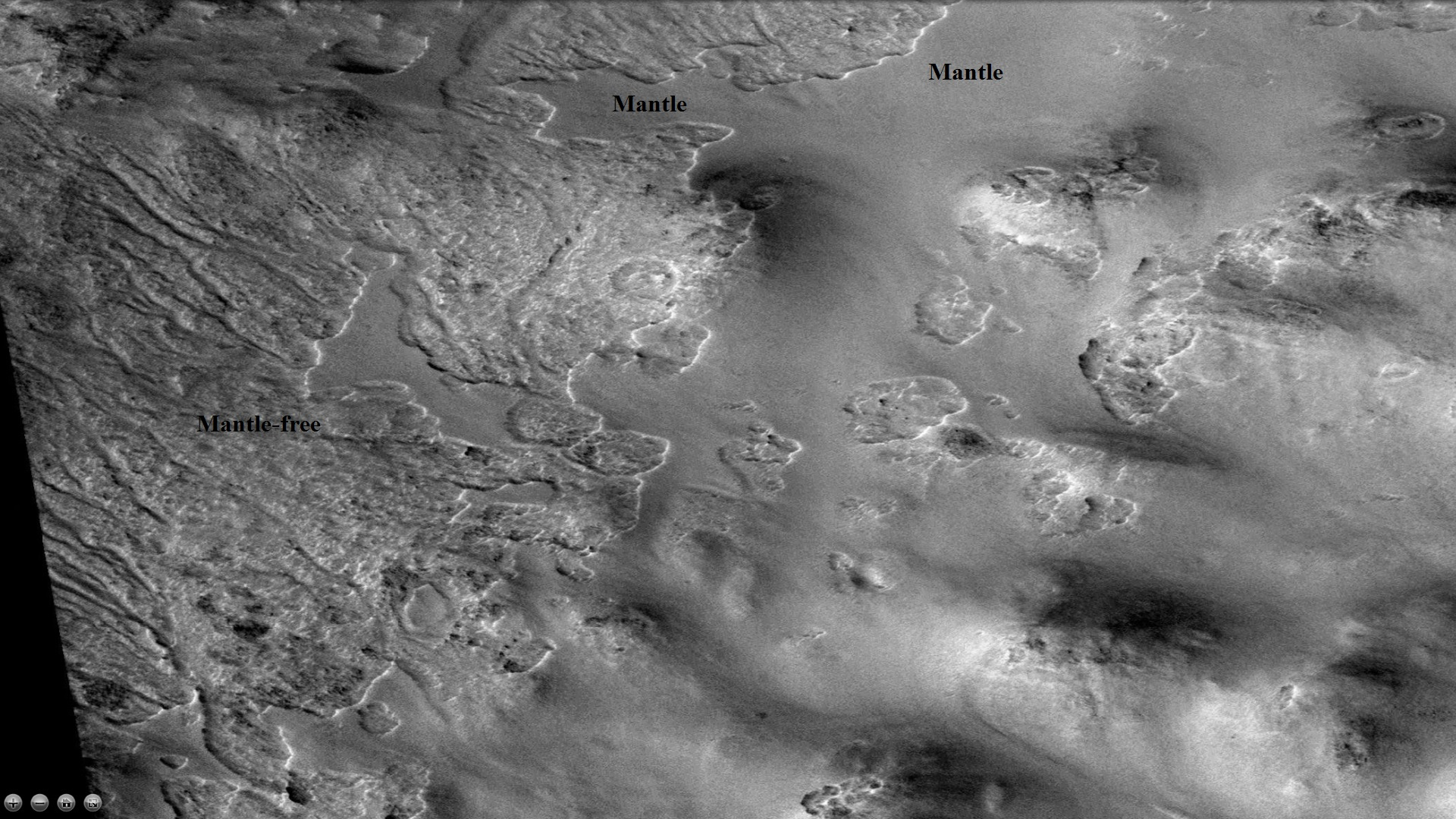
Channels and mantle, as seen by CTX camera (on Mars Reconnaissance Orbiter). Channels are exposed where the mantle has disappeared.

== See also ==
- List of craters on Mars
