= Yevgeny Perepyolkin =

Soviet astronomer

Yevgeny Yakovlevich Perepyolkin (Russian: Евге́ний Я́ковлевич Перепёлкин; 4 March 1906 – 13 January 1938) was a Soviet astronomer. He headed the astrophysics department of the Pulkovo Observatory until he was arrested on 11 May 1937 for counter-revolutionary agitation. He was sent to a penal labour camp in Krasnoyarsk Krai, and was executed on 13 January 1938.

He worked at the Pulkovo Observatory when he led the observation of the proper motion of stars with respect to extragalactic nebula.

A crater on Mars and another on the Moon were named in his honor.
