= Kondratyuk (crater) =

Crater on the Moon

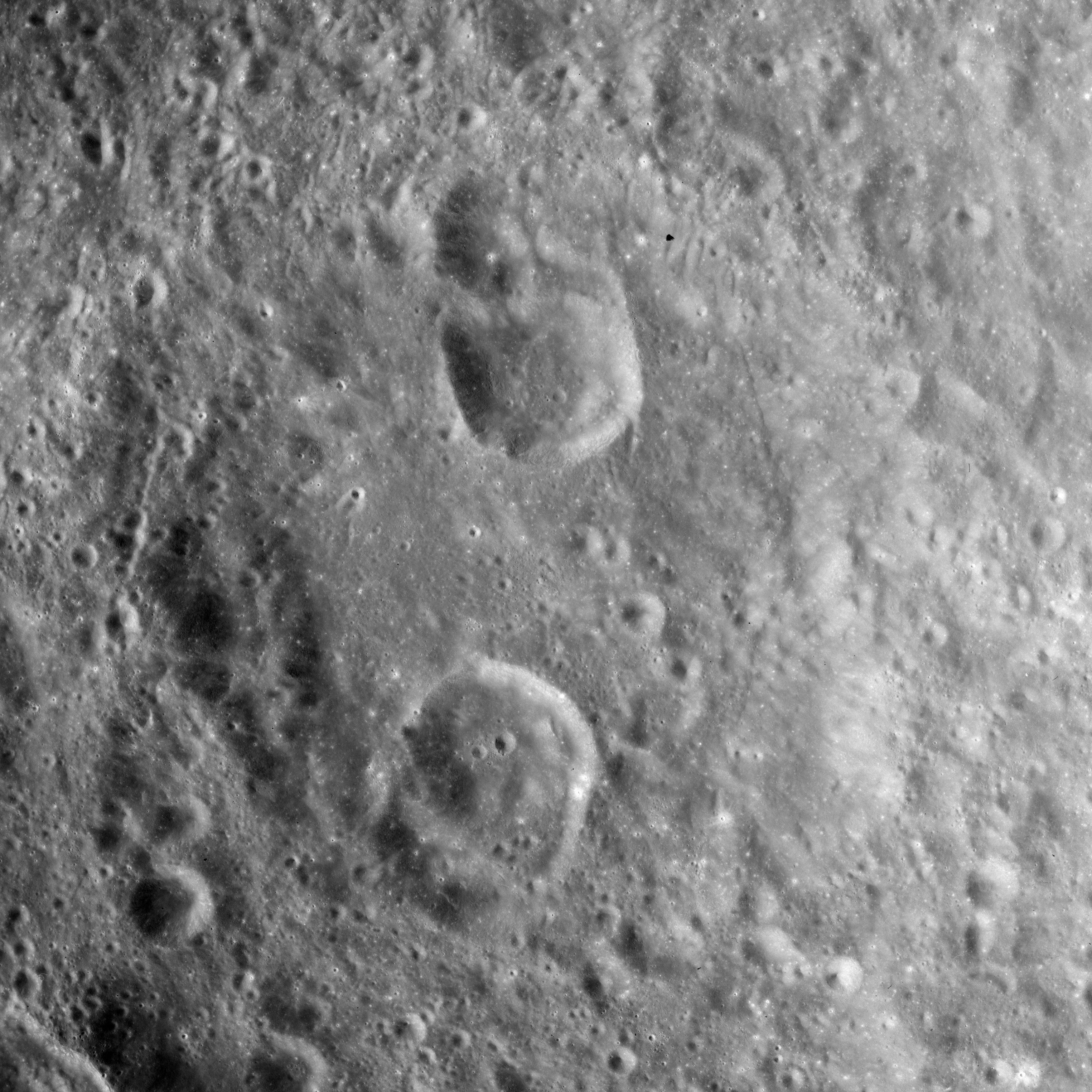
- Apollo 15 mapping camera image of Kondratyuk. North is in upper left. Kondratyuk A is at top, Kondratyuk Q at bottom.
- Coordinates: 15.33°S 115.80°E
- Diameter: 97.97 km (60.88 mi)
- Depth: Unknown
- Colongitude: 245° at sunrise
- Eponym: Yuri V. Kondratyuk

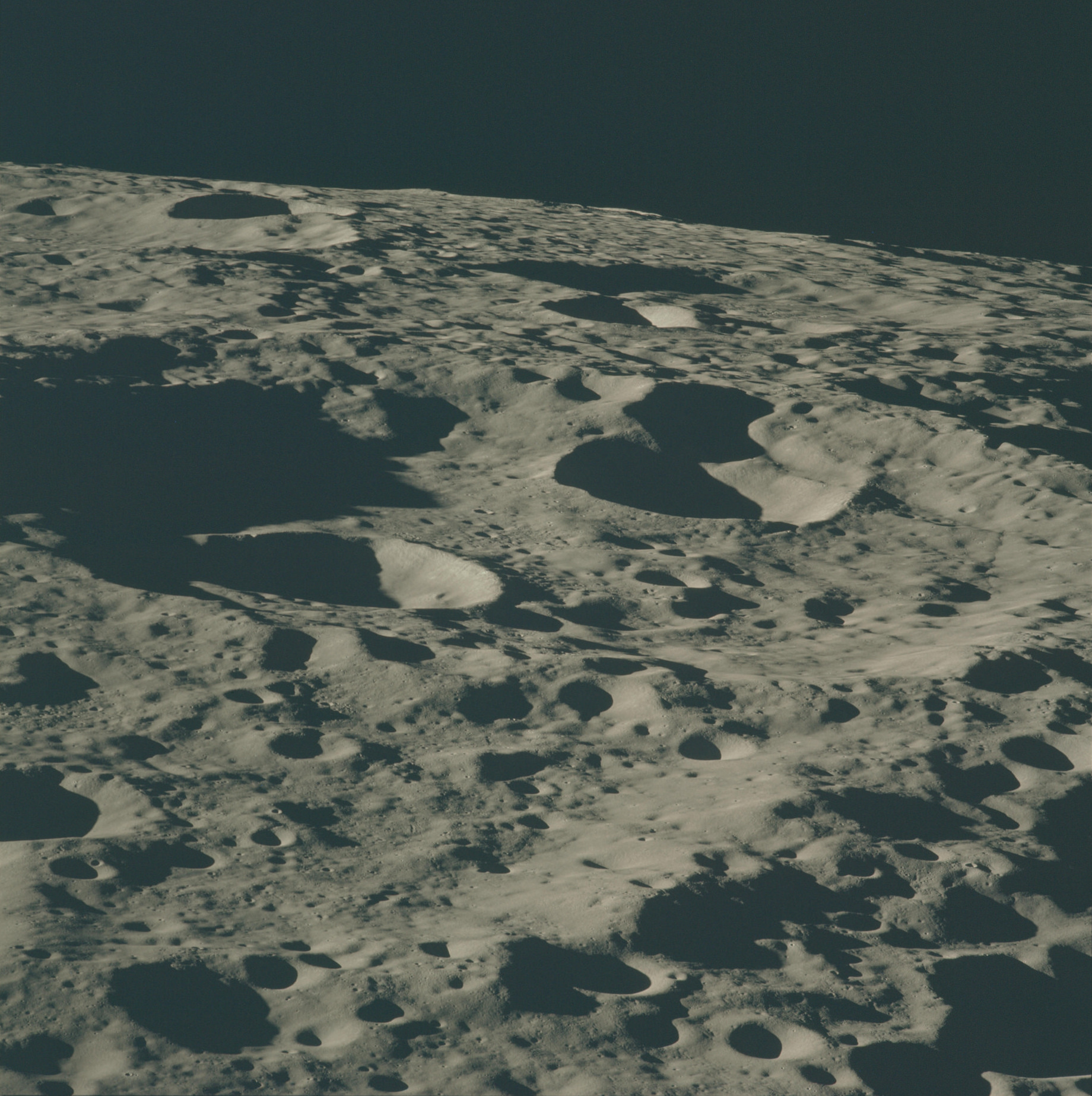
Oblique angle view of Kondratyuk from Apollo 15. NASA photo.

Kondratyuk is a worn crater on the Moon's far side. It is located to the west-northwest of a large walled plain named Fermi, and to the northeast of the crater Hilbert. To the north-northwest is Meitner, and to the northeast lies Langemak.

This is an eroded crater formation with a rim that has been partly damaged by subsequent impacts. It includes a 21.6-km long lobate scarp. The small, sharp-rimmed satellite crater Kondratyuk A lies on the interior floor, along the northeast inner wall. In the southwest part of the floor is Kondratyuk Q.

Prior to formal naming by the IAU in 1970, Kondratyuk was called Crater 278. It is named in honor of Yuri Kondratyuk, a Ukrainian and Soviet engineer and mathematician, who fought and died in World War II, as a volunteer of the Red Army.

== Satellite craters ==
By convention these features are identified on lunar maps by placing the letter on the side of the crater midpoint that is closest to Kondratyuk. In this case both satellite craters are within Kondratyuk itself.

Kondratyuk	Latitude	Longitude	Diameter
A	14.2° S	115.5° E	25 km
Q	15.7° S	114.7° E	28 km
