= Danjon scale =

Measurement of appearance of lunar eclipse

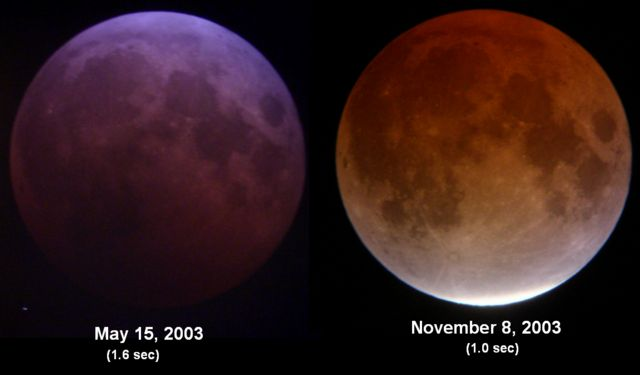
Two total lunar eclipses in 2003. Their ratings on the Danjon scale would be roughly 2 (left) and 4 (right).

The Danjon scale is a five-point scale useful for measuring the appearance and luminosity of the Moon during a total lunar eclipse. It was proposed by André-Louis Danjon in 1921, when postulating that the brightness of a lunar eclipse was related to the solar cycle. An eclipse's rating on the scale is traditionally denoted by the letter L.

== The scale ==
The Danjon scale is described in the following table:

L value	Description
0	Very dark eclipse. Moon almost invisible, especially at greatest eclipse.
1	Dark eclipse, grey or brownish in coloration. Details distinguishable only with difficulty.
2	Deep red or rust-colored eclipse. Very dark central shadow, while outer edge of umbra is relatively bright.
3	Brick-red eclipse. Umbral shadow usually has a bright or yellow rim.
4	Very bright, copper-red or orange eclipse. Umbral shadow has a bluish, very bright rim.

== Determining the value of L ==
Determination of the value of L for an eclipse is best done near mid-totality with the naked eye. The scale is subjective, and different observers may determine different values. In addition, different parts of the Moon may have different L values, depending on their distance from the center of the Earth's umbra.

== Factors affecting the value of L ==
Many factors can affect the appearance of the Moon during a lunar eclipse. The Moon's path through the Earth's umbra is important, but so too are the current conditions of the Earth's atmosphere. While the Earth's shadow blocks any direct light from striking the Moon during a lunar eclipse, some light is refracted through the Earth's atmosphere giving the Moon a red hue.

The amount of light refracted affects the brightness of the moon at mid-eclipse, and this depends on several factors. Volcanic eruptions are one of the most significant - eruptions which spew significant amounts of volcanic ash into the air are generally followed by several years of dark, deep red eclipses. The effect of the 1991 eruption of Mount Pinatubo on subsequent lunar eclipses was very noticeable, with the eclipse of 9 December 1992 rated 0 on the Danjon Scale by many observers.

It is also thought that the solar cycle has some effect on the darkness of lunar eclipses--indeed Danjon established the scale for this reason.
