= Danjon (crater) =

Crater on the Moon

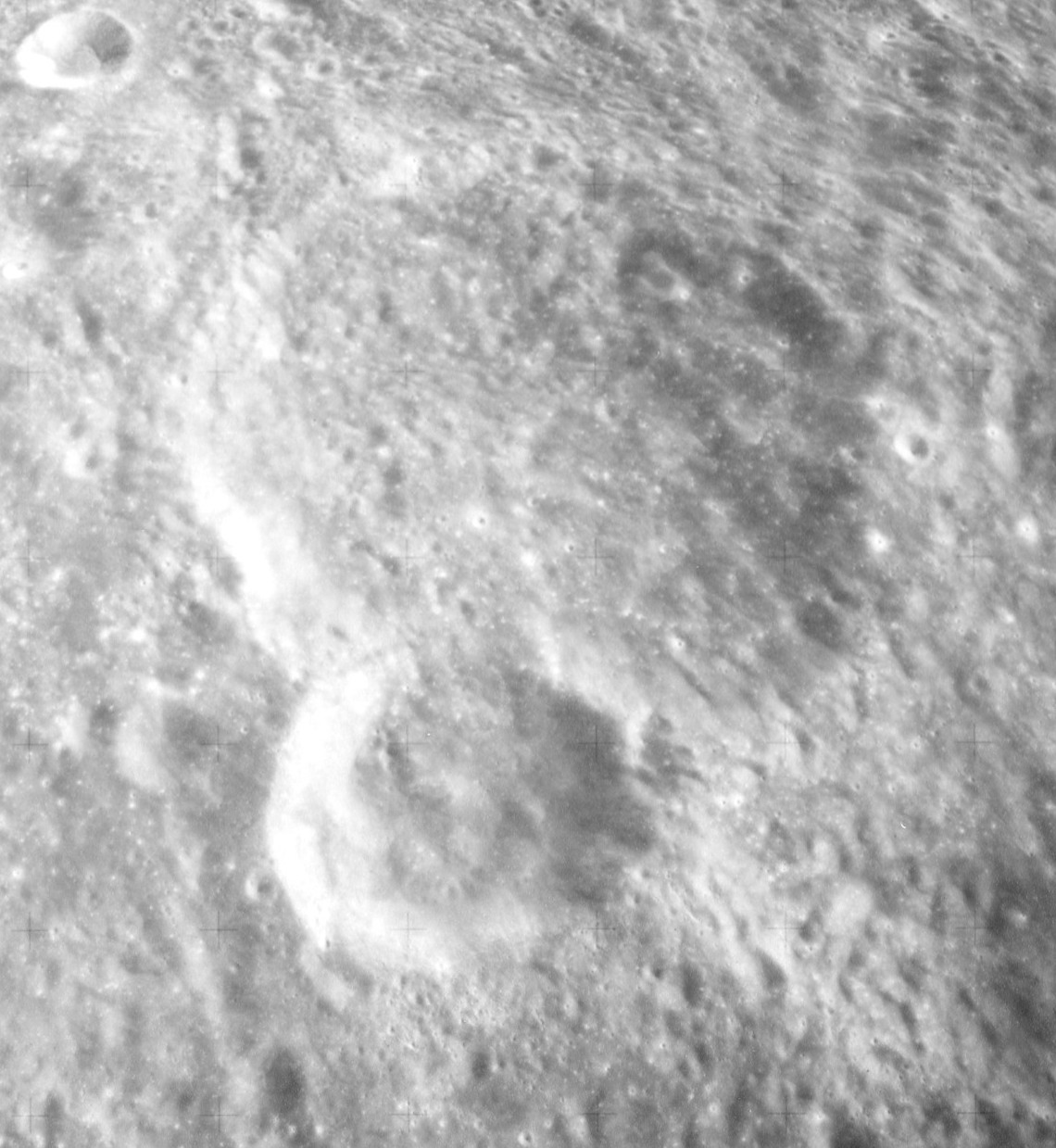
- Oblique Apollo 17 Mapping Camera image of Danjon crater (larger) and D'Arsonval crater (below center), facing south
- Coordinates: 11.42°S 123.90°E
- Diameter: 69.3 km (43.1 mi)
- Depth: 4.7 km (2.9 mi)
- Colongitude: 237° at sunrise
- Eponym: André Danjon

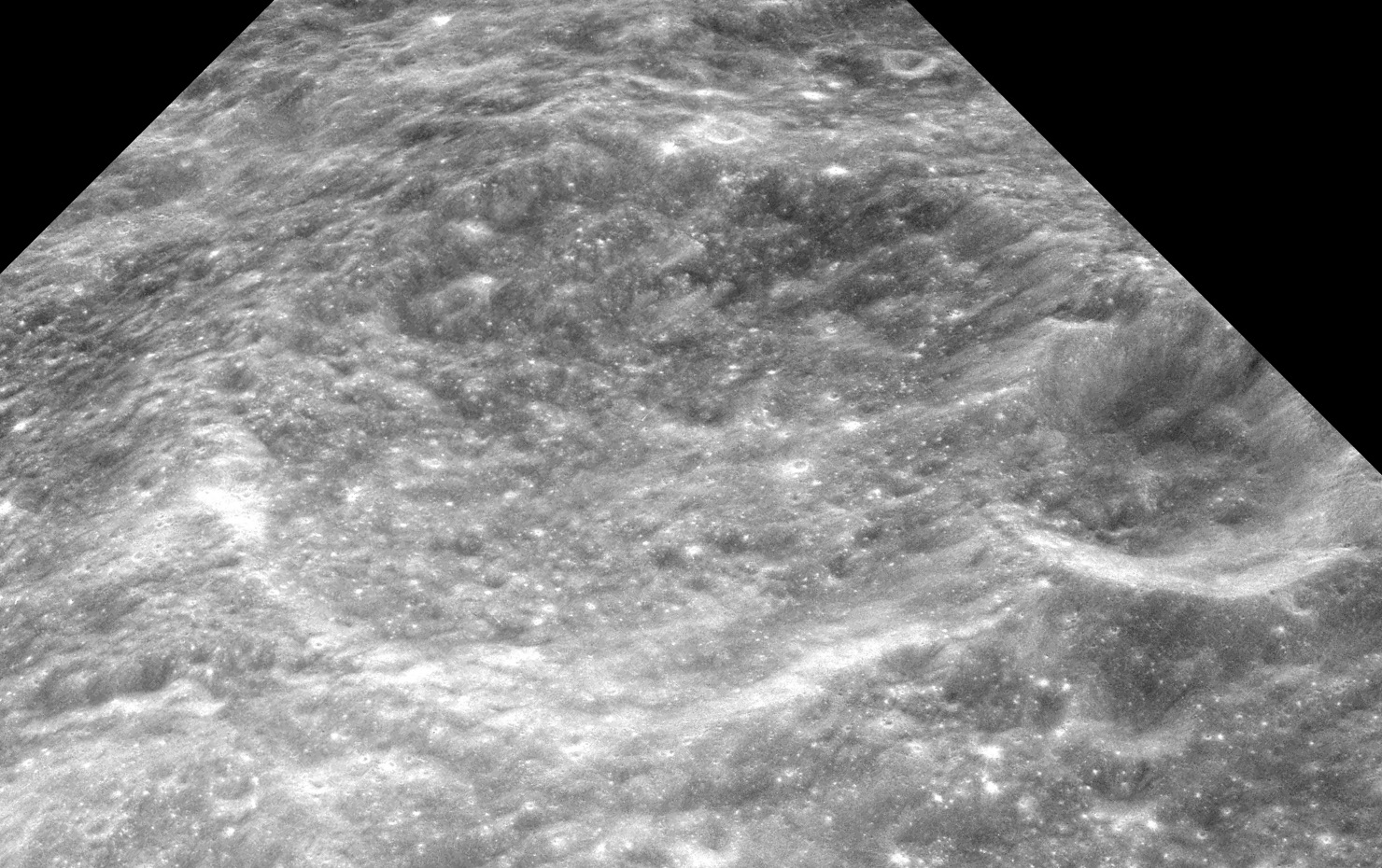
Oblique view facing east-northeast, from Apollo 8

Danjon is a lunar impact crater on the far side of the Moon. It lies less than a crater diameter to the east-southeast of the larger crater Langemak. To the east-northeast of Danjon is the crater Perepelkin, and due south lies the walled plain called Fermi.

The northeastern rim of Danjon is overlain by the smaller crater D'Arsonval. Danjon overlies the southeastern corner of the slightly smaller satellite crater Danjon X. The outer rim of Danjon is worn and eroded, particularly at the southern end, and the interior floor is irregular and marked by several small craterlets.

The crater was named after French astronomer André Danjon (1890–1967). Its designation was formally adopted by the IAU in 1970.

== Satellite craters ==
By convention these features are identified on lunar maps by placing the letter on the side of the crater midpoint closest to Danjon.

Danjon	Latitude	Longitude	Diameter
J	12.8° S	125.6° E	23 km
K	13.8° S	125.1° E	17 km
M	13.9° S	124.1° E	12 km
X	10.0° S	122.8° E	65 km
