= François Auguste Claude =

French astronomer

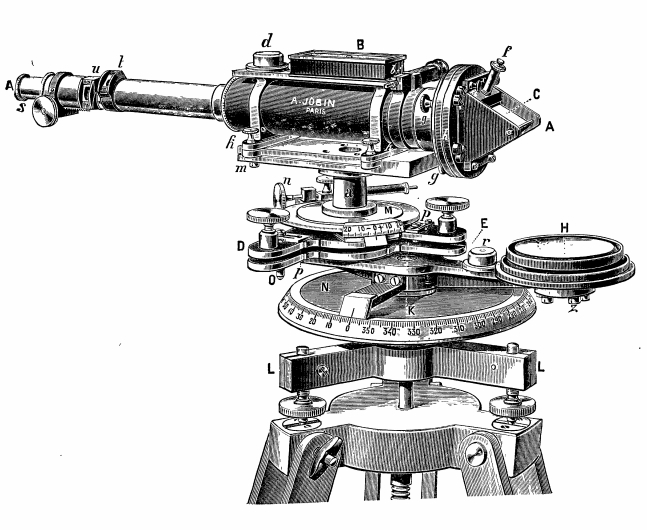
A Claude-Driencourt astrolabe made by Jobin

François Auguste Claude (30 December 1858 – 15 July 1938) was a French astronomer who worked at the Bureau des Longitudes which dealt with the measurement of longitude and the maintenance of standard time. He designed the first prismatic astrolabe in 1899.

Claude was born in Strasbourg and following the annexation of the Alsace region by Germany in 1871 he chose French citizenship and served in the army. He then worked as a designer for six years and joined the Bureau des Longitudes at the Parc de Montsouris in Paris. Despite having no formal university degrees, he became assistant calculator in 1884 and rose to the position of director in 1929. His most important contribution was the design of a (60°) prismatic astrolabe which he published first in 1899 and then improved in collaboration with the hydrographer Joseph-Ferdinand-Ludovic Driencourt (1858-1940). This design was manufactured by Jobin of Paris and available in three sizes in the 1910s. It included a magnetic compass, a graduated circular scale to measure angle from the magnetic north. A pan of mercury below acted as a perfect mirror. When a star reached a specific ascension angle above the horizon (60° in this case), its image and its reflection would be aligned in the viewfinder to obtain a precise angular measurement. A mercury mirror below the prism allowed aligning of This was further modified by Andre Danjon in 1938 and more popularly referred to as the Danjon astrolabe.
