= André-Louis Danjon =

French astronomer (1890–1967)

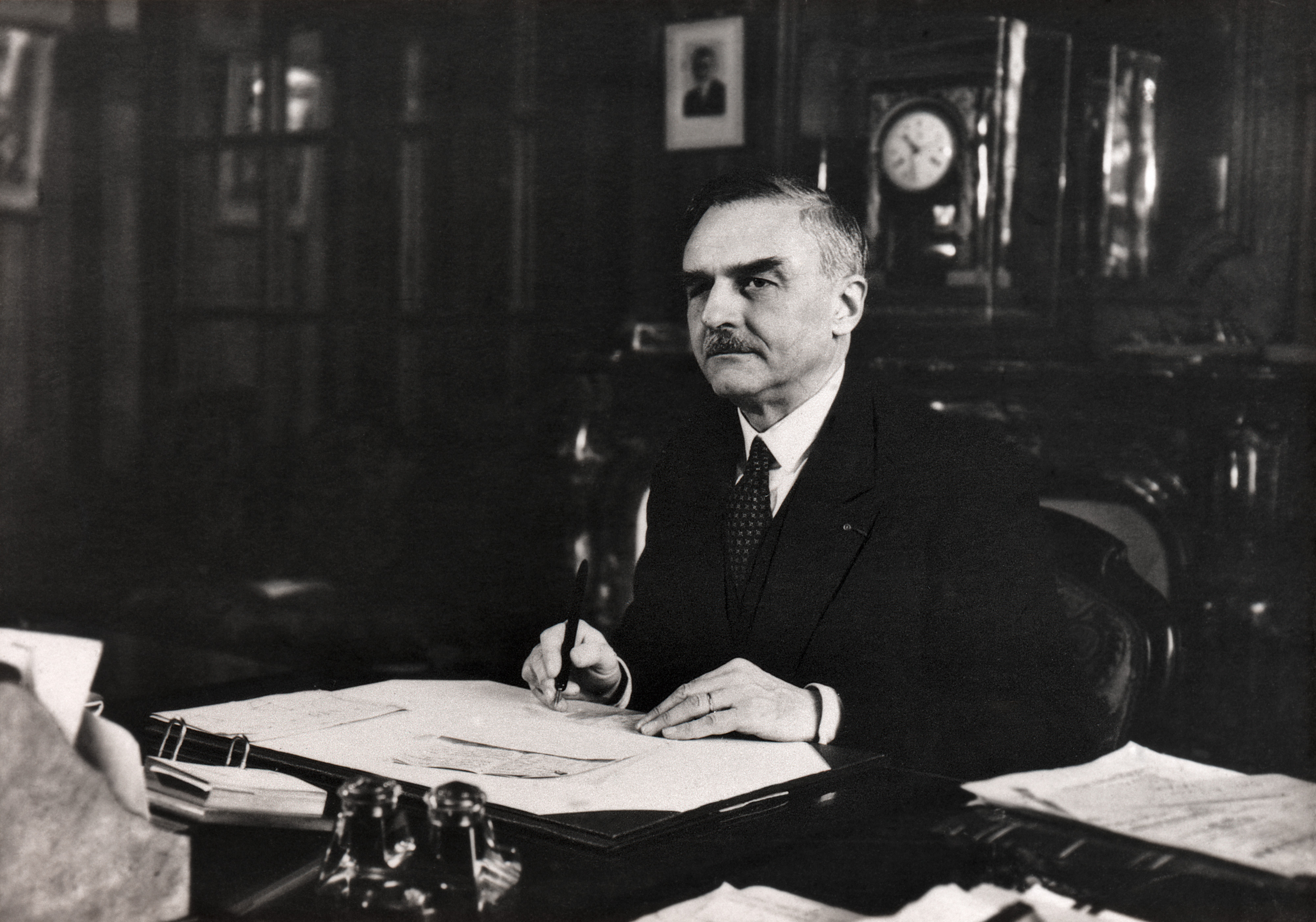
- Born: 6 April 1890; Caen
- Died: 21 April 1967 (aged 77); Suresnes
- Known for: Danjon scale
- Awards: Gold Medal of the Royal Astronomical Society in 1958
- Scientific career
- Fields: astronomy
- Doctoral advisor: Ernest Esclangon

André-Louis Danjon (French: [ɑ̃dʁelwi dɑ̃ʒɔ̃]; 6 April 1890 – 21 April 1967) was a French astronomer who served as director of the Observatory of Strasbourg from 1930 to 1945 and of the Paris Observatory from 1945 to 1963. He developed several astronomical instruments to examine the regularity of the rotation of the Earth and among his discoveries was an acceleration of the rotation of the Earth during periods of intense solar activity occurring in 11-year cycles correlated with an increase in earthquakes. The Danjon scale is used for measuring the intensity of lunar eclipses. He noted an increase in the number of dark lunar eclipses with solar activity which is termed as the Danjon effect.

== Life and work ==
Danjon was born in Caen to drapers Louis Dominique Danjon and Marie Justine Binet. He studied at the Lyce Malherbe and then went to the Ecole Normale Superieure during which time he worked at the observatory of the Societe Astronomique de France. He graduated in 1914 and was conscripted into the army during World War I. He served under Ernest Esclangon and lost an eye in combat in Champagne. He received war honours in 1915 and in 1919 he was appointed aide-astronome to the Strasbourg University. He took up duties as an observer at the Strasbourg Meridian observatory an began to work on the improvement of the observatory. He was involved in establishing a new observatory, the Observatoire de Haute-Provence which became operational in 1923.

Danjon devised a method to measure "earthshine" on the darkside of the Moon using a telescope in which a prism split the Moon's image into two identical side-by-side images. By adjusting a diaphragm to dim one of the images until the sunlit portion had the same apparent brightness as the earthlit portion on the unadjusted image, he could quantify the diaphragm adjustment, and thus had a real measurement for the brightness of earthshine. He recorded the measurements using his method (now known as the Danjon scale, on which zero equates to a barely visible Moon) from 1925 until the 1950s. He extended similar methods to study the albedo of Venus and Mercury which became the subject of his doctoral dissertation Recherches de photometrie astronomique (1928) at Paris University. In 1930 he succeeded Ernest Esclangon as director of the Strasbourg Observatory. He was also appointed as a professor at Strasbourg University. In 1939, German invasion forced the move of faculty to Clermont-Ferrand near Vichy. He was arrested in November 1943 and he escaped being sent to Auschwitz and was released in January. After World War II, Esclangon retired from his position at the Paris Observatory and Danjon replaced him. Here he taught at the Sorbonne. In the 1960s he persuaded the government to establish the European Southern Observatories at La Silla and at Paranal. He also supported the establishment of radio astronomy.at Nancay in 1956.

Among his notable contributions to astronomy was the design of the impersonal (prismatic) astrolabe based on an earlier prismatic astrolabe developed by François Auguste Claude which is now known as the Danjon astrolabe, which led to an improvement in the accuracy of fundamental optical astrometry. An account of this instrument, and of the results of some early years of its operation, are given in Danjon's 1958 George Darwin Lecture to the Royal Astronomical Society.

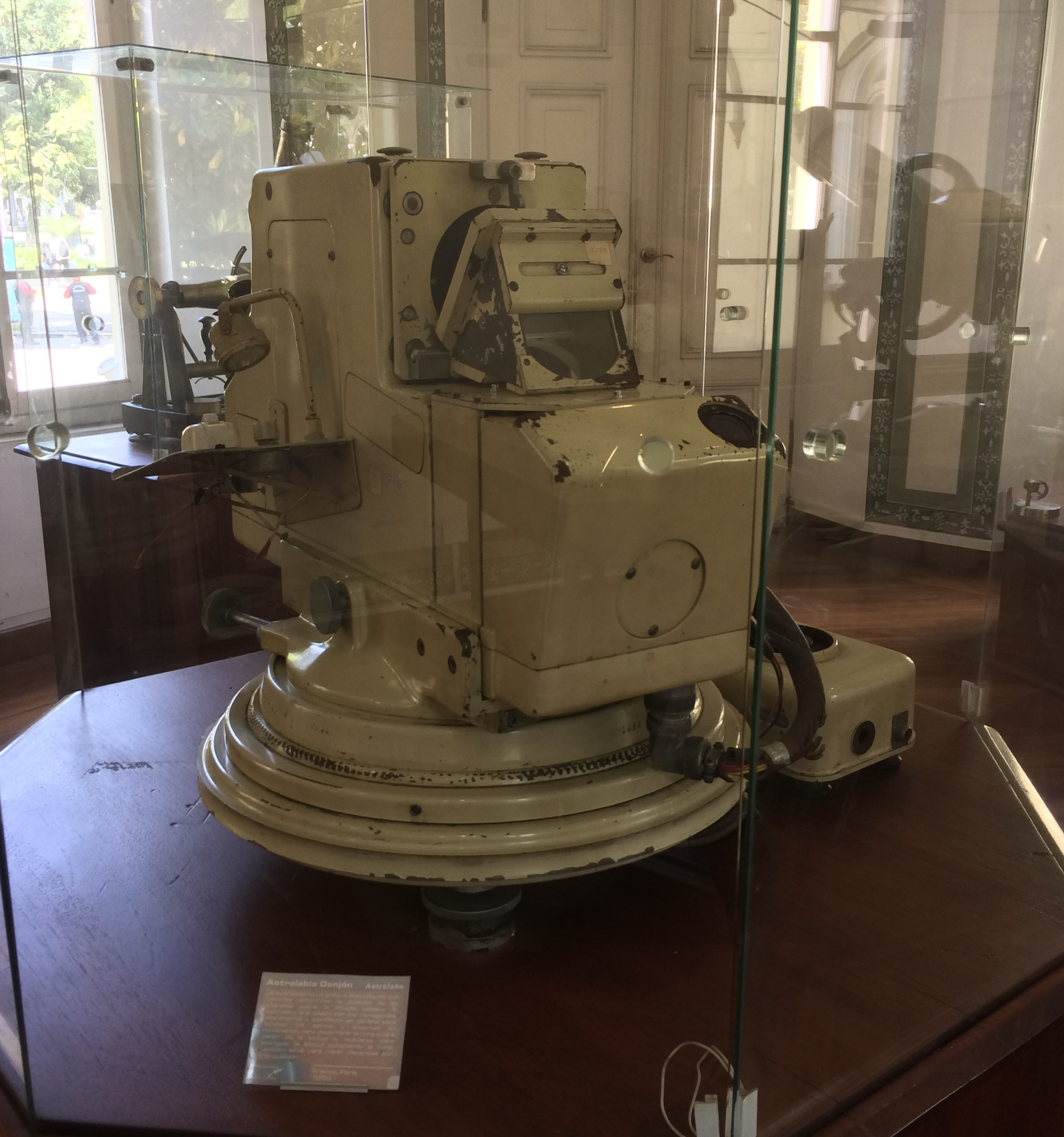
Danjon Prismatic Astrolabe (OPL, 1954). Quito Astronomical Observatory.

The "Danjon limit", a proposed measure of the minimum angular separation between the Sun and the Moon at which a lunar crescent is visible is named after him. However, this limit may not exist. The Danjon effect is a name given for his observation that there is an increase in the number of "dark" total lunar eclipses during the 11 year solar sunspot maxima. He developed an astrolabe to identify irregularity in the rotational periodicity and concluded that there was increases in the Earth's rotation during intense solar activity. He suggested that the atmospheric darkness might be due to an increase in aerosols in the atmosphere due to increased volcanic activity.

Danjon was the President of the Société astronomique de France (SAF), the French astronomical society, during two periods: 1947–49 and 1962–64. He was awarded the Prix Jules Janssen of the Société astronomique de France in 1950, and the Gold Medal of the Royal Astronomical Society in 1958. In 1946 he was made Officier of the Legion d'Honneur and in 1954 he was made Commandeur.

Danjon died in 1967 in Suresnes, Hauts-de-Seine. He was married to Madeleine Renoult (m. 1919, died 1965) and they had four children. Danjon crater on the far side of the Moon was named after him in 1970.
