= Perepelkin (lunar crater) =

Crater on the Moon

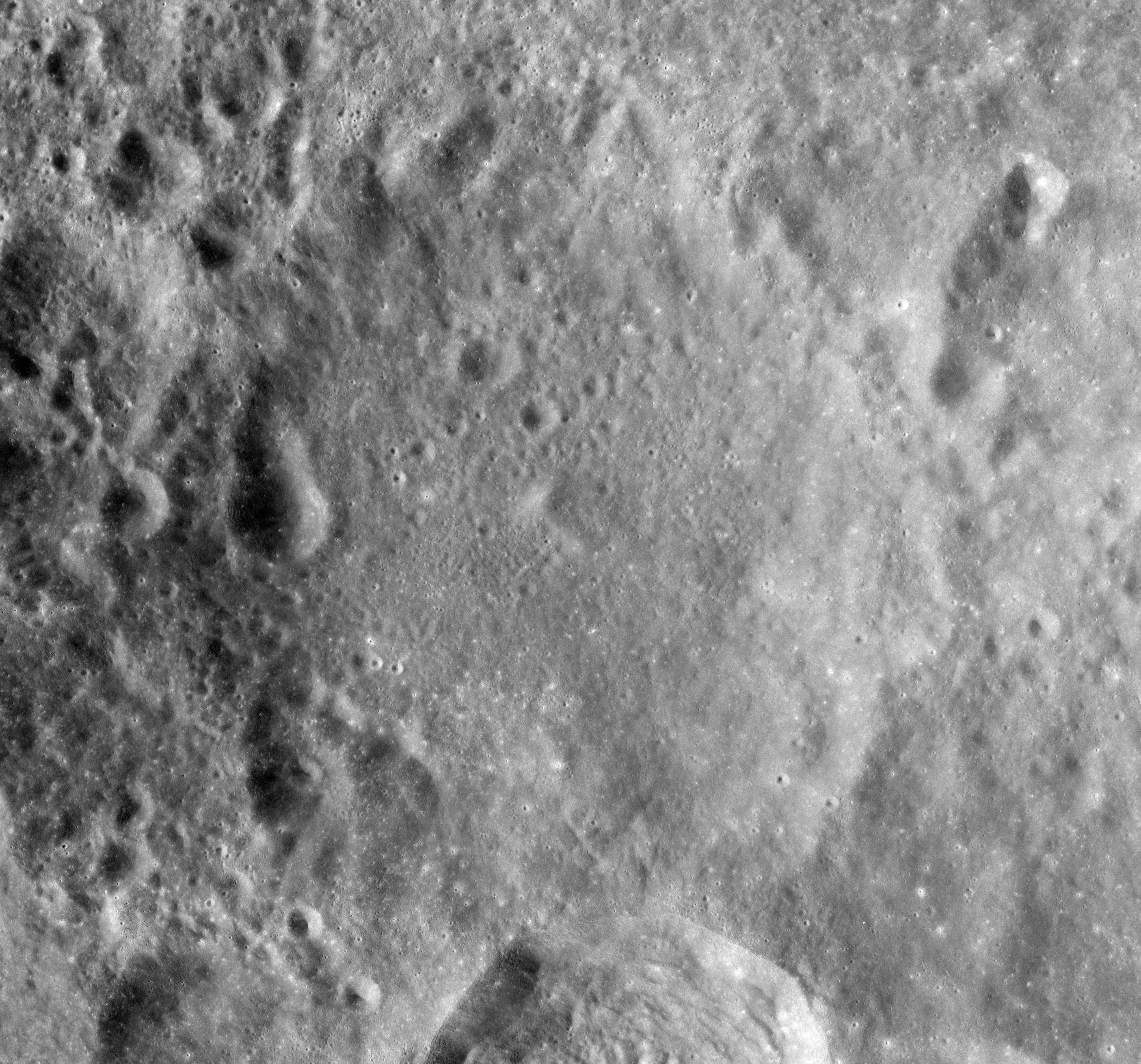
- Apollo 17 Mapping Camera image
- Coordinates: 9.99°S 128.80°E
- Diameter: 88.74 km (55.14 mi)
- Colongitude: 231° at sunrise
- Eponym: Yevgeny Perepyolkin

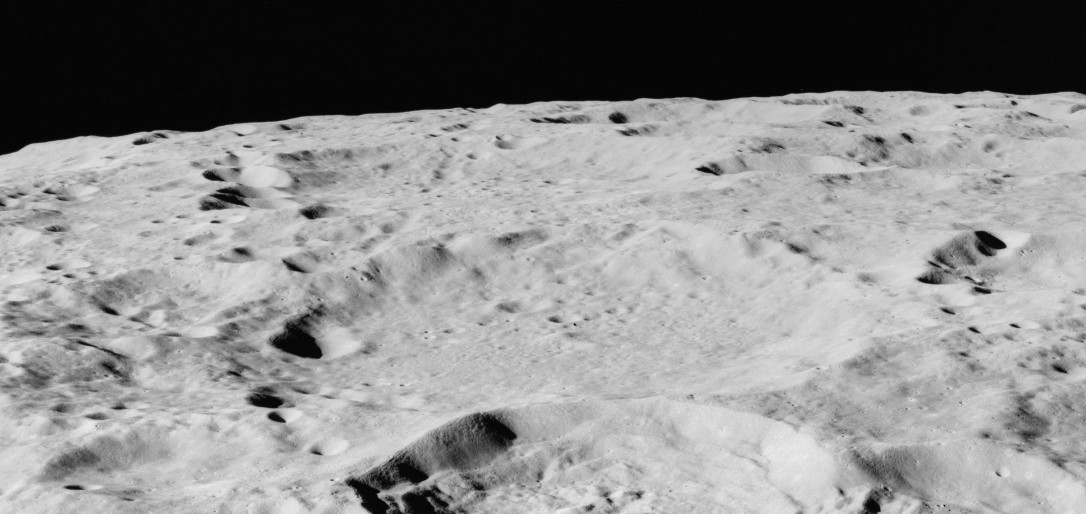
Oblique view from Apollo 15

Perepelkin is a lunar impact crater that is located on the far side of the Moon, just to the south of the similar crater Love. Attached to the exterior of its southern rim is the smaller Shirakatsi. Less than one crater diameter to the east-northeast is Lane, and to the west-southwest are the co-joined Danjon and D'Arsonval.

The rim of this crater is relatively heavily eroded, and is similar in appearance to Love to the north. Along the western inner wall is an odd, pear-shaped crater that is probably a merge of two impacts. There is a short chain of small craters along the southwestern inner wall. The floor is pitted by tiny impacts, but is relatively level compared to the surrounding terrain. There is a small central peak at the midpoint that has a ridge extension to the southeast.

The crater was named after Soviet astrophysicist Yevgeny Perepyolkin by the IAU in 1970. The crater was known as Crater 285 prior to naming.

== Satellite craters ==
By convention these features are identified on lunar maps by placing the letter on the side of the crater midpoint that is closest to Perepelkin.

Perepelkin	Latitude	Longitude	Diameter
P	12.4° S	127.3° E	25 km
