= Coomans =

Coomans or Cooman (Dutch pronunciation: [ˈkoːmɑn(s)]) is a Dutch occupational surname most common in Belgium. The name derives via assimilation from the common surname Koopman ("merchant). Among variant forms are Comans, Coopman(s), De Cooman, Koeman(s), Kooman, Koomen, and Koopmans. People with this name include:

Cooman

- Carson Cooman (born 1982), American composer and organist
- Jerry Cooman (born 1966), Belgian road cyclist
- Nelli Cooman (born 1964), Dutch sprinter of Surinamese origin
- Albert de Cooman (1880–1967), Belgian entomologist

Coomans

- Diana Coomans (1861–1952), Belgian painter, sister of Heva
- Heva Coomans (1860–1939), Belgian painter, sister of Diana
- Jacques Coomans (1888–1980), Belgian racing cyclist
- Pierre Olivier Joseph Coomans (1816–1889), Belgian painter, father of Heva and Diana

De Cooman

- Daan De Cooman (born 1974), Belgian judoka
- Jan De Cooman (1893–1949), Belgian painter

Kooman

- Andrew Kooman (born 1979), Canadian author playwright
- Michael Kooman (born 1984), American cabaret and musical composer

== See also ==
- Coman, surname, usually of Celtic origin
- Charles Kennedy Comans (1914–2012), Australian lawyer and lecturer
