= Koomen =

Koomen is a Dutch surname. It is possibly of patronymic or of occupational origin; the latter via Kooman from Koopman ("merchant"). People with this surname include:

- Bert Koomen (born 1997), Dutch football defender
- Pete Koomen (born 1980s), American software developer, co-founder of Optimizely
- Philip Koomen (born 1953), British furniture designer and maker
- Stijn Koomen (born 1987), Dutch television and film actor
- Theo Koomen (1929–1984), Dutch sports reporter on radio and television
- Lee Koomen (born 1991), Owner of several construction companies in Canada including Koomen Contracting

== See also ==
- Koomen, alternate name of the former settlement of Panamenik, California
- Kooman, surname
- Komen (disambiguation)
- Comet Howard–Koomen–Michels, a large sungrazer
