= List of It Takes a Thief (1968 TV series) episodes =

It Takes a Thief is an American action-adventure television series that aired on ABC for three seasons between 1968 and 1970. It stars Robert Wagner in his television debut as sophisticated thief Alexander Mundy, who works for the U.S. government in return for his release from prison. The program features the adventures of Mundy, a cat burglar, pickpocket, and thief who steals to finance his life as a polished playboy and sophisticate. He is serving time in San Jobel prison when the U.S. government's SIA (the fictional Secret Intelligence Agency) proposes a deal to Mundy: steal for the government in exchange for his freedom. Mundy is puzzled and asks, "Let me get this straight. You want me to steal?" In the main opening titles, his new SIA boss, Noah Bain, uses the catch phrase, "Oh, look, Al, I'm not asking you to spy. I'm just asking you to steal."

This is a list of episodes for the television series.

== Series overview ==
Season	Episodes	Originally released	
Season	Episodes	First released	Last released
1	16	January 9, 1968	April 30, 1968
2	26	September 24, 1968	April 22, 1969
3	24	September 25, 1969	March 23, 1970

== Episodes ==
=== Season 1 (1968) ===
No. overall	No. in season	Title	Directed by	Written by	Original release date
1	1	"A Thief Is a Thief"	Leslie Stevens	Roland Kibbee & Leslie Stevens	January 9, 1968
Guest stars: Senta Berger, Raymond Burr, Leslie Nielsen, Eddie "Rochester" Anderson, Wally Cox, Les Crane, James Drury, Doug McClure, Kurt Kasznar, Joe Louis, Susan Saint James, Michael Forest, Anita Eubank, Willi Koopman, Stuart Margolin and Donald Barry
2	2	"It Takes One to Know One"	Leslie Stevens	Leslie Stevens	January 16, 1968
Guest stars: Mark Richman, Alfred Ryder, Susan Saint James, Len Birman and Francine York
3	3	"When Boy Meets Girl"	Don Weis	Dean Hargrove	January 30, 1968
Guest stars: Suzy Parker, Donnelly Rhodes and David Hurst
4	4	"A Very Warm Reception"	Don Weis	Leslie Stevens	February 6, 1968
Guest stars: Simon Oakland, Katherine Crawford, Gavin MacLeod, Hagan Beggs, Stanley Waxman and Ilka Windish
5	5	"One Illegal Angel"	Leonard Horn	Stephen Kandel	February 13, 1968
Guest stars: Fernando Lamas, Kate Woodville, Anthony Zerbe and Francine York
6	6	"Totally by Design"	Michael Caffey	T : Dean Hargrove; S/T : Alvin Sapinsley	February 20, 1968
Guest stars: Tina Louise, John van Dreelen, Mari Blanchard, Ron Soble, Oscar Beregi, Jr. and Francine York
7	7	"When Thieves Fall In"	Don Weis	Leslie Stevens	February 27, 1968
Guest stars: Susan Saint James, Mario Alcade, Terry Jenkins, Ben Wright, Ben Astar, Cec Linder, Charlene Holt, Amzie Strickland and Lorna Thayer
8	8	"A Spot of Trouble"	Herschel Daugherty	S : Mort Zarcoff; S/T : Gene L. Coon	March 5, 1968
Guest stars: Katherine Crawford, William Campbell, Cliff Osmond, Joan Patrick and Barbara Rhoades
9	9	"When Good Friends Get Together"	Lee H. Katzin	Dean Hargrove	March 12, 1968
Guest stars: Rosemary Forsyth, Patrick Adiarte; James Shigeta (special guest star)
10	10	"Birds of a Feather"	Don Weis	Glen A. Larson	March 19, 1968
Guest stars: Tisha Sterling, Mark Lenard, Strother Martin, Charlene Holt, Taina Elg
11	11	"To Steal a Battleship"	Michael Caffey	Jerry Devine	March 26, 1968
Guest stars: Bill Bixby, Linda Marsh, Janis Hansen, Maurice Marsac
12	12	"Turnabout"	Don Weis	S : Mort Zarcoff; S/T : Gene L. Coon	April 2, 1968
Guest stars: Ida Lupino, Steve Ihnat, Shannon Farnon, Lawrence Montaigne
13	13	"The Radomir Miniature"	Michael Caffey	Stephen Kandel	April 9, 1968
Guest stars: Ina Balin, Jill Donohue, Richard Van Vleet, Than Wyenn, Eve Plumb
14	14	"Locked in the Cradle of the Keep"	Leonard Horn	Dick Nelson	April 16, 1968
Guest stars: Celeste Yarnall, Marti Stevens, Joe Bernard
15	15	"A Matter of Royal Larceny"	Michael Caffey	Tony Barrett	April 23, 1968
Guest stars: Lynda Day, Henry Wilcoxon, Ben Murphy, Brenda Benet, Don Knight
16	16	"The Lay of the Land"	Don Weis	T : Alvin R. Friedman; S/T : Richard Collins	April 30, 1968
Guest stars: Hermione Gingold; Sheila Larken (introducing); Larry D. Mann, Stuart Margolin, Helen Funai, Cathy Lee Crosby

=== Season 2 (1968–69) ===
No. overall	No. in season	Title	Directed by	Written by	Original release date
17	1	"One Night on Soledade"	Don Weis	Alan Caillou	September 24, 1968
Guest stars: Nancy Kovack, Madlyn Rhue and Logan Ramsey
18	2	"A Sour Note"	Don Weis	S : Mort Zarcoff; S/T : Gene L. Coon	October 1, 1968
Guest stars: Suzanne Pleshette, Harvey Lembeck and Gino Conforti
19	3	"The Bill Is in Committee"	Don Weis	Elroy Schwartz	October 8, 1968
Guest stars: Yvonne Craig, Jocelyn Lane and Roger C. Carmel
20	4	"The Thingamabob Heist"	Jack Arnold	Burt Styler	October 15, 1968
Guest stars: Ricardo Montalbán, Bill Russell and Sharon Acker
21	5	"Get Me to the Revolution on Time"	Leonard Horn	Paul Tuckahoe & Glen A. Larson	October 22, 1968
Guest stars: Ivan Dixon, Wende Wagner, Morgan Woodward, Ena Hartman and Rodolfo Hoyos, Jr.
22	6	"The Packager"	Leonard Horn	Leonard Stadd	October 29, 1968
Guest stars: Alex Dreier and Lee Meredith
23	7	"Hans Across the Border: Part 1"	Don Weis	Glen A. Larson	November 12, 1968
Guest stars: Joseph Cotten, Pamela Austin and Willi Koopmann
24	8	"Hans Across the Border: Part 2"	Don Weis	Glen A. Larson	November 19, 1968
Guest stars: Joseph Cotten, Pamela Austin and Willi Koopmann
25	9	"A Case of Red Turnips"	Don Weis	Mort Zarcoff	November 26, 1968
Guest star: Noel Harrison
26	10	"The Galloping Skin Game"	Michael Caffey	S : Leigh Chapman; S/T : Gene L. Coon	December 3, 1968
Guest stars: Richard Kiel, Ricardo Montalbán and Martine Beswick
27	11	"Glass Riddle"	George Tyne	B.W. Sandefur	December 17, 1968
Guest stars: Mrs. Robert Wagner (Marion Marshall) and Jason Evers
28	12	"To Catch a Roaring Lion"	Marc Daniels	Robert Malcolm Young	December 31, 1968
Guest stars: George Takei, Brock Peters and Denise Nicholas
29	13	"Guess Who's Coming to Rio?"	Bruce Kessler	Glen A. Larson	January 7, 1969
Guest stars: Teri Garr, Michael Ansara, Alejandro Rey, Arlene Martel
30	14	"The Artist Is For Framing"	Don Weis	Glen A. Larson & Marty Roth	January 21, 1969
Guest stars: Paul Henreid and Gia Scala
31	15	"The Naked Billionaire"	Norman Foster	Stephen Kandel	January 28, 1969
Guest star: Sally Kellerman
32	16	"A Matter of Grey Matter: Part 1"	Jack Arnold	T : Gene L. Coon; S/T : Tony Barrett	February 4, 1969
Guest stars: Joey Heatherton and Barry Williams
33	17	"A Matter of Grey Matter: Part 2"	Jack Arnold	T : Gene L. Coon; S/T : Tony Barrett	February 11, 1969
Guest stars: Joey Heatherton and Barry Williams
34	18	"Catspaw"	Jerry Hopper	T : Glen A. Larson; S/T : Joel Kane	February 18, 1969
Guest stars: Fernando Lamas and Sharon Acker
35	19	"Boom at the Top"	Paul Stanley	Glen A. Larson	February 25, 1969
Guest stars: Carol Lynley, Roddy McDowall and Barry Sullivan
36	20	"The Funeral Is on Mundy"	Allen Reisner	Steohen Kandel	March 11, 1969
Guest stars: Julie Newmar, John Williams and John Orchard
37	21	"The Baranoff Time Table"	Michael O'Herlihy	T : Mort Zarcoff; S/T : Carey Wilbur	March 18, 1969
Guest star: Jessica Walter
38	22	"Rock-Bye, Bye, Baby"	Semour Robbie	Mort Zarcoff	March 25, 1969
Guest stars: Gavin MacLeod, Melodie Johnson, Edmond O'Brien
39	23	"The Family"	Joseph Sargent	T : David P. Harmon; S/T : K. C. Alison	April 1, 1969
Guest stars: Geraldine Brooks, Carla Borelli
40	24	"38-23-36"	Tony Leader	Elroy Schwartz	April 8, 1969
Guest star: Nancy Kovack
41	25	"The Great Chess Gambit"	Jeannot Szwarc	Glen A. Larson & Bruce Belland	April 15, 1969
Guest stars: Nehemiah Persoff, Stuart Margolin, María Noel, Greg Mullavey
42	26	"Mad in Japan"	George Tyne	Mort Zarcoff	April 22, 1969
Guest stars: Sharon Acker, Alex Dreier

=== Season 3 (1969–70) ===
Malachi Throne was no longer a regular cast member by this time, and his Noah Bain was no longer a regular character; Edward Binns's Wallie Powers had become Alexander Mundy's boss.

No. overall	No. in season	Title	Directed by	Written by	Original release date
43	1	"Saturday Night in Venice"	Jack Arnold	Stephen Kandel	September 25, 1969
Guest stars: Delia Boccardo and John Russell
44	2	"Who'll Bid Two Million Dollars?"	Jeannot Szwarc	Robert I. Holt	October 2, 1969
Guest stars: Edward Binns, Nicoletta Machiavelli and Paola Pitagora; Peter Sellers (special guest star)
45	3	"The Beautiful People"	Jeannot Szwarc	Glen A. Larson	October 9, 1969
Guest stars: Teri Garr and John Van Dreelen
46	4	"The Great Casino Caper"	Jack Arnold	Glen A. Larson	October 16, 1969
Guest stars: Fred Astaire and Adolfo Celi
47	5	"Flowers from Alexander"	Bruce Kessler	Glen A. Larson	October 23, 1969
Guest star: Senta Berger
48	6	"The Blue, Blue Danube"	Bruce Kessler	Oscar Brodney	October 30, 1969
Guest stars: Martine Beswick and John Russell
49	7	"The Three Virgins of Rome"	Jack Arnold	Glen A. Larson	November 6, 1969
Guest stars: Karin Dor and Edmund Purdom
50	8	"Payoff in the Piazza"	Gerd Oswald	Oscar Brodney	November 13, 1969
Guest stars: David Opatoshu, Rudy Solari, Carla Borelli and John Russell
51	9	"The King of Thieves"	Bruce Kessler	Glen A. Larson	November 20, 1969
Guest stars: Martha Hyer, Edward Binns, Lex Barker and Lionel Stander
52	10	"A Friend in Deed"	Bruce Kessler	B.W. Sandefur	November 27, 1969
Guest stars: Henry Silva, Frankie Avalon, Thomas Gomez and John Russell
53	11	"The Second Time Around"	Gerd Oswald	Glen A. Larson	December 4, 1969
Guest stars: Adolfo Celi, Edward Binns and Alice Ghostley
54	12	"The Old Who Came in from the Spy"	Gerd Oswald	S : Jeannot Szwarc; S/T : Sy Salkowitz	December 11, 1969
Guest stars: Elsa Lanchester, Edward Binns, Francis Lederer and Richard Haydn
55	13	"To Lure a Man"	Barry Shear	Sy Salkowitz	December 18, 1969
Guest stars: Wilfrid Hyde-White and Tina Sinatra
56	14	"The Scorpio Drop"	Robert Gist	William Bast	December 25, 1969
Guest stars: Gale Sondergaard and Eduard Franz
57	15	"Nice Girls Marry Stockbrokers"	Barry Shear	S : Byron Twiggs; T : Norman Hudis	January 12, 1970
Guest stars: Michele Carey and Geoffrey Holder
58	16	"The Steal-Driving Man"	Glen A. Larson	Glen A. Larson	January 19, 1970
Guest stars: Dick Smothers, Felicia Farr, Edward Binns and Mario Andretti
59	17	"Touch of Magic"	Gerd Oswald	Oscar Brodney	January 26, 1970
Guest stars: Bette Davis and Edward Binns
60	18	"Fortune City"	Barry Shear	Sy Salkowitz	February 2, 1970
Guest stars: Stefanie Powers and Timothy Carey
61	19	"Situation Red"	Joseph Sargent	Glen A. Larson	February 9, 1970
Guest star: Earl Holliman
62	20	"To Sing a Song of Murder"	Barry Shear	Norman Hudis	February 23, 1970
Guest stars: Joseph Cotten, Will Kuluva and Beah Richards Special appearance by: The 5th Dimension
63	21	"The Suzie Simone Caper"	Don Taylor	T : Oscar Brodney; S/T : William Bast	March 2, 1970
Guest stars: Susan Saint James and Edward Binns
64	22	"An Evening with Alister Mundy"	Jack Arnold	Glen A. Larson	March 9, 1970
Guest stars: Edward Binns, Francesco Mule and Gavin MacLeod
65	23	"Beyond a Treasonable Doubt"	Barry Shear	Norman Hudis	March 16, 1970
Guest stars: Ahna Capri and Joseph Cotten Cesar Romero (special guest star)
66	24	"Project X"	Jack Arnold	Glen A. Larson	March 23, 1970
Guest stars: Tina Sinatra, Kate Woodville, Edward Binns Wally Cox (special guest star)
