= Wieghorst =

Wieghorst is a surname. Notable people with the surname include:

- Karl Wieghorst (born 1871), Danish photographer
- Morten Wieghorst (born 1971), Danish football player and manager
- Olaf Wieghorst (1899–1988), Danish-born American painter
