= ASM-135 ASAT =

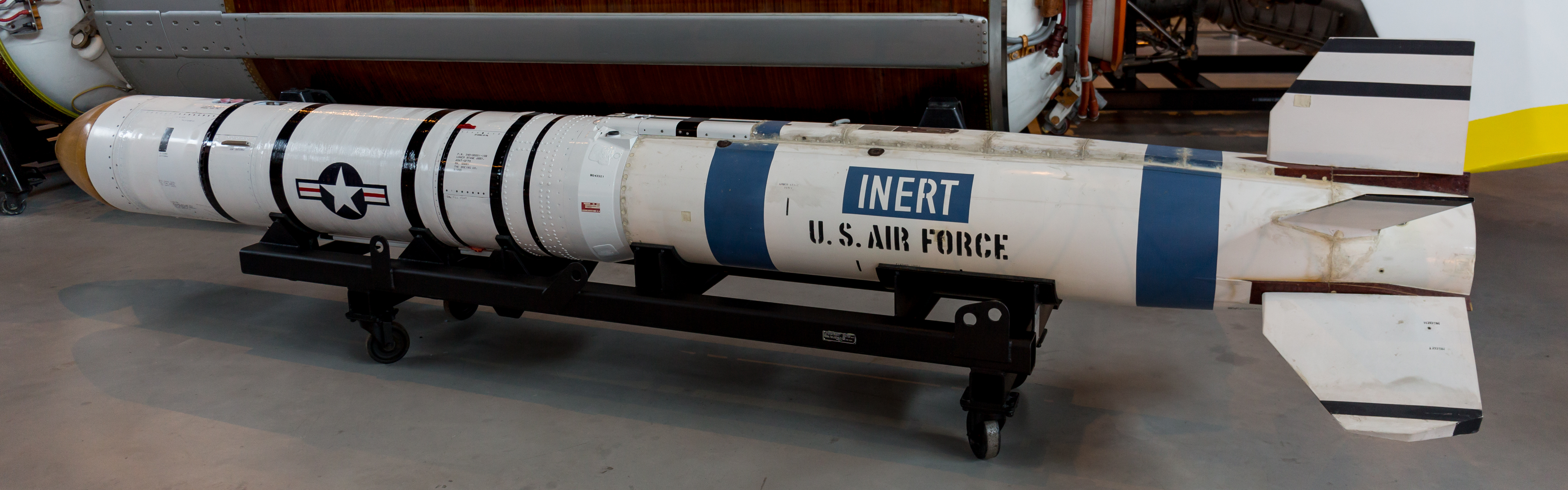
- ASM-135 ASAT at the Steven F. Udvar-Hazy Center
- Type: Anti-satellite missile
- Place of origin: United States

Service history
- In service: Not deployed

Production history
- Manufacturer: LTV Aerospace
- Produced: 1984

Specifications
- Mass: 2600 lb (1,180 kg)
- Length: 18 ft (5.48 m)
- Diameter: 20 in (50.8 cm)
- Warhead: Kinetic energy kill
- Operational range: 403 miles (648 km)
- Flight ceiling: 350 miles (563 km)
- Maximum speed: Mach 12 >13,000ft/s, 8,860 mph (14,260 km/h)
- Guidance system: Infrared homing seeker
- Launch platform: F-15 Eagle

The ASM-135 ASAT is an air-launched anti-satellite multistage missile that was developed by Ling-Temco-Vought's LTV Aerospace division. The ASM-135 was carried exclusively by United States Air Force (USAF) F-15 Eagle fighter aircraft. The program was cancelled in 1988.

== Development ==
Starting in the late 1950s, the United States began development of anti-satellite weapons. The first US anti-satellite weapon was the Bold Orion Weapon System 199B (also the High Virgo missile, Weapon System 199C, attempted to conduct an ASAT test but failed to intercept its target; High Virgo's test was a few weeks before Bold Orion's). Like the ASM-135, the Bold Orion missile was air-launched, but in this case from a B-47 Stratojet. The Bold Orion was tested on 19 October 1959 against the Explorer 6 satellite. The two-stage Bold Orion missile passed within 4 miles (6.4 km) of Explorer 6. From this distance, only a relatively large yield nuclear warhead would likely have destroyed the target.

Starting in 1960 the Department of Defense (DoD) started a program called SPIN (SPace INtercept). In 1962, the US Navy launched Caleb rockets as part of the Satellite Interceptor Program, with the objective of developing an anti-satellite weapon.

The United States developed direct ascent anti-satellite weapons. A modified United States Army Nike Zeus missile successfully intercepted an orbiting satellite in May 1963. One missile from this system known as Project MUDFLAP and later as Project 505 was available for launch from 1964 until 1967. A nuclear-armed Thor anti-satellite system deployed by the Air Force under Program 437 eventually replaced the Project 505 Nike Zeus in 1967. The Program 437 Thor missile system remained in limited deployment until 1975. One drawback of nuclear-armed anti-satellite weapons was that they could also damage United States reconnaissance satellites. As a result, the United States anti-satellite weapons development efforts were re-directed to develop systems that did not require the use of nuclear weapons.

After the Soviet Union started developing an anti-satellite system, in 1978, U.S. President Jimmy Carter directed the USAF to develop and deploy a new anti-satellite system.

In 1978, the USAF started a new program initially designated the Prototype Miniature Air-Launched Segment (PMALS) and Air Force Systems Command's Space Division established a system program office. The USAF issued a Request for Proposal for the Air-Launched Miniature Vehicle (ALMV). The requirement was for an air-launched missile that could be used against satellites in low Earth orbit.

In 1979, the USAF issued a contract to LTV Aerospace to begin work on the ALMV. The LTV Aerospace design featured a multi-stage missile with an infrared homing kinetic energy warhead.

== Design ==
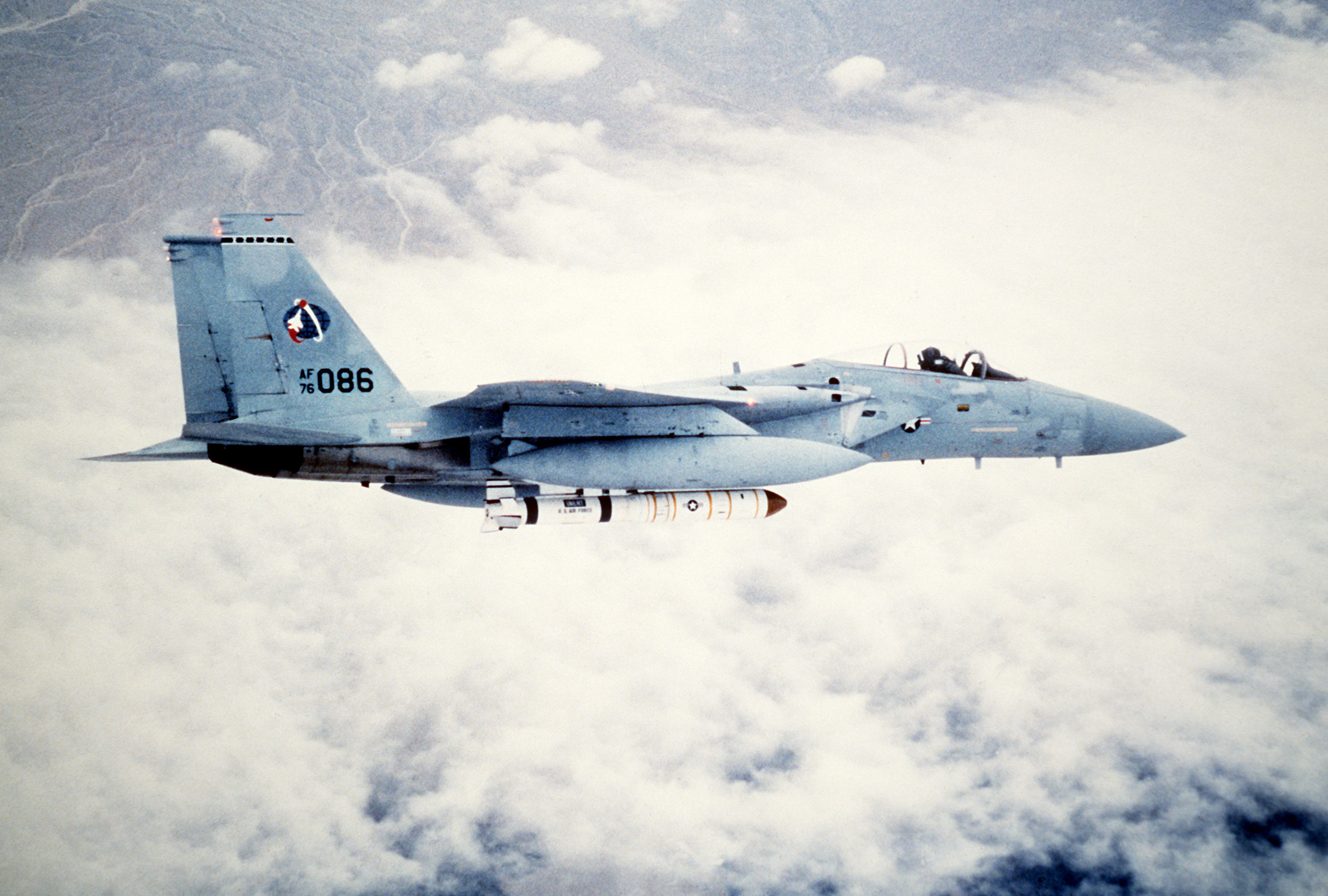
F-15 carrying an ASM-135, 1983

The ASM-135 was designed to be launched from an F-15A in a supersonic zoom climb. The F-15's mission computer and heads-up display were modified to provide steering directions for the pilot.

A modified Boeing AGM-69 SRAM missile with a Lockheed Propulsion Company LPC-415 solid propellant two pulse rocket motor was used as the first stage of the ASM-135 ASAT.

The LTV Aerospace Altair 3 was used as the second stage of the ASM-135. The Altair 3 used the Thiokol FW-4S solid propellant rocket engine. The Altair 3 stage was also used as the fourth stage for the Scout rocket and had been previously used in both the Bold Orion and Hi-Hoe (Caleb) anti-satellite weapons efforts. The Altair was equipped with hydrazine fueled RCS thrusters that could be used to point the missile towards the target satellite.

LTV Aerospace also provided the third stage for the ASM-135 ASAT. This stage was called Miniature Homing Vehicle (MHV) interceptor. Prior to being deployed the second stage was used to spin the MHV up to approximately 30 revolutions per second and point the MHV towards the target.

A Honeywell ring laser gyroscope was used for spin rate determination and to obtain an inertial timing reference before the MHV separated from the second stage. The infrared sensor was developed by Hughes Research Laboratories. The sensor used a strip detector where four strips of Indium Bismuth were arranged in a cross and four strips were arranged as logarithmic spirals. As the detector was spun, the infrared target's position could be measured as it crossed the strips in the sensor's field of view. The MHV infrared detector was cooled by liquid helium from a dewar installed in place of the F-15's gun ammunition drum and from a smaller dewar located in the second stage of the ASM-135. Cryogenic lines from the second stage were retracted prior to the spin up of the MHV.

The MHV guidance system solely tracked targets in the field of view of the infrared sensor, but did not determine altitude, attitude, or range to the target. Direct Proportional Line of Sight guidance used information from the detector to maneuver and null out any line-of-sight change. A Bang-bang control system was used to fire 56 full charge "divert" and lower thrust 8 half charge "end-game" solid rocket motors arranged around the circumference of the MHV. The half charge 8 "end-game" motors were used to perform finer trajectory adjustments just prior to intercepting the target satellite. Four pods at the rear of the MHV contained small attitude control rocket motors. These motors were used to damp off center rotation by the MHV.

== Test launches ==
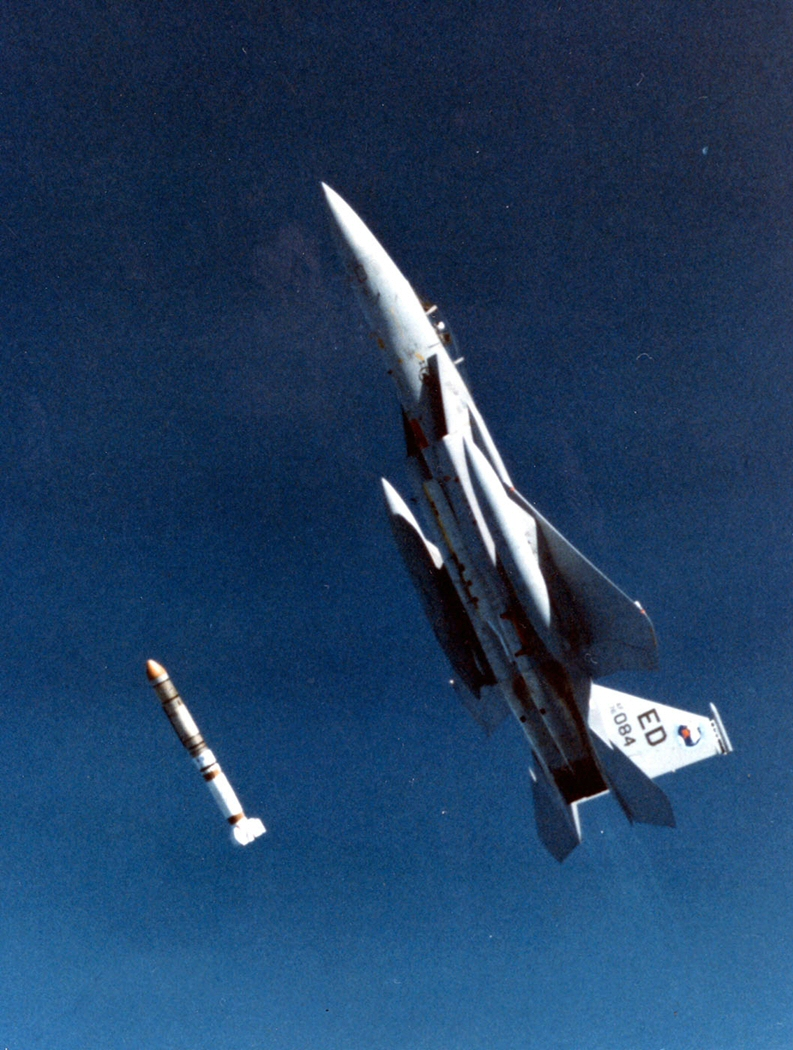
An F-15A Eagle launches the ASM-135 during the sole practical test, which destroyed the Solwind P78-1 satellite.

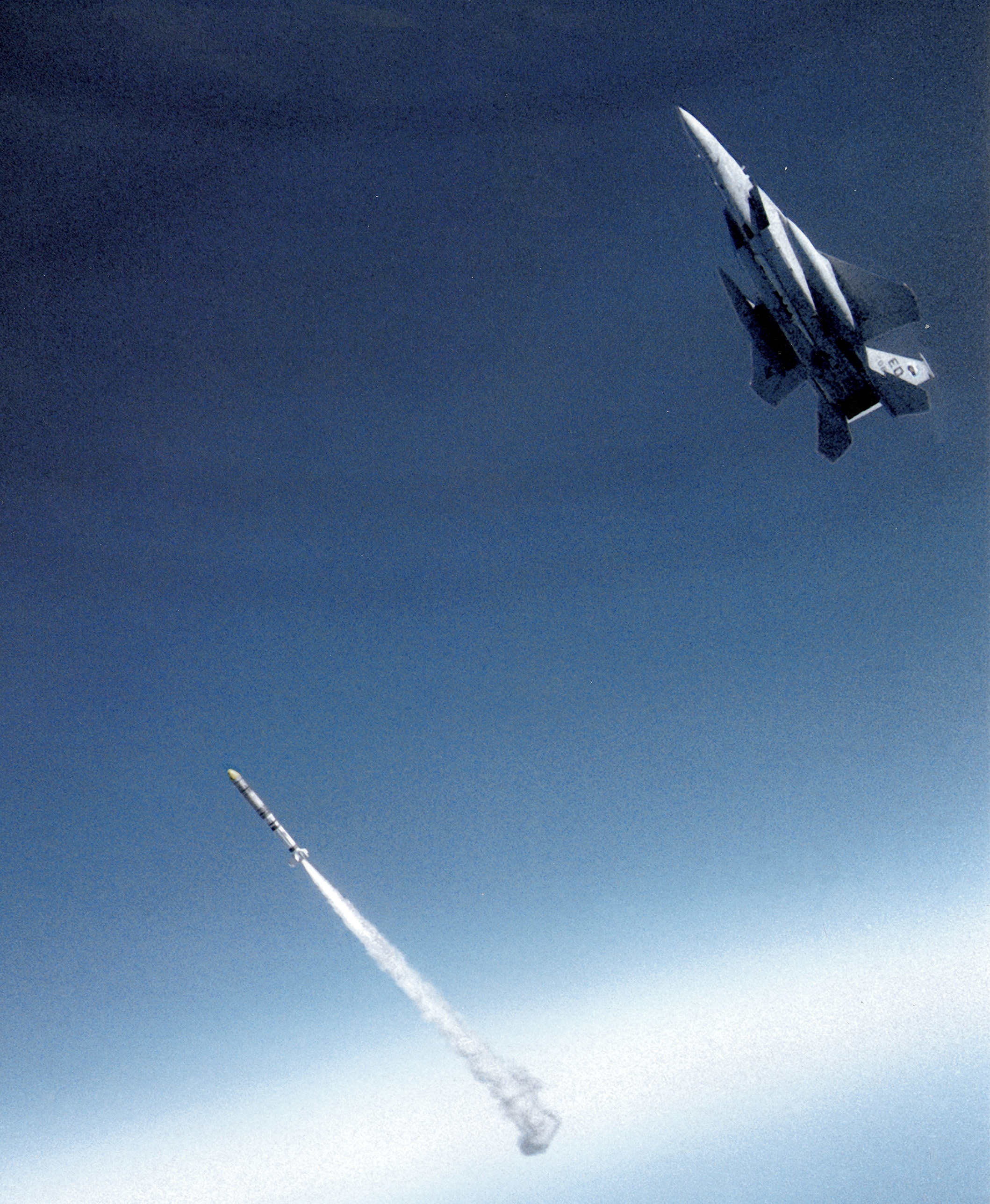
Motor ignition of the ASM-135.

On 21 December 1982, an F-15A was used to perform the first captive carry ASM-135 test flight from the Air Force Flight Test Center, Edwards AFB, California in the United States.

On 20 August 1985 Ronald Reagan authorized a test against a satellite. The test was delayed to provide notice to the United States Congress. The target was the Solwind P78-1, an orbiting solar observatory that was launched on 24 February 1979.

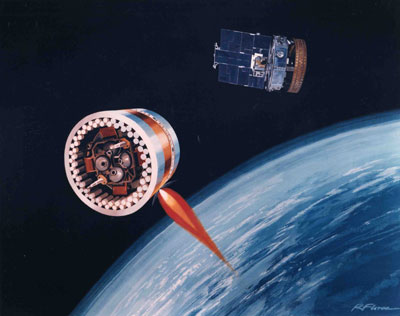
Artists impression of Solwind intercepted by an ASM-135

On 13 September 1985, Wilbert D. "Doug" Pearson, flying the "Celestial Eagle" F-15A 76-0084 launched an ASM-135 ASAT about 320 kilometres (200 mi) west of Vandenberg Air Force Base and destroyed the Solwind P78-1 satellite flying at an altitude of 555 kilometres (345 mi). Prior to the launch, the F-15 — flying at Mach 1.22 — executed a 3.8 g_{0} (37 m/s^{2}) zoom climb at an angle of 65 degrees. The ASM-135 ASAT was automatically launched at 11,600 metres (38,100 ft) while the F-15 was flying at Mach 0.934 (994.2 km/h; 617.7 mph). The 14 kilograms (30 lb) MHV collided with the 910 kilograms (2,000 lb) Solwind P78-1 satellite at closing velocity of 24,000 kilometres per hour (15,000 mph; 6.7 km/s).

NASA learned of U.S. Air Force plans for the Solwind ASAT test in July 1985. NASA modeled the effects of the test. This model determined that debris produced would still be in orbit in the 1990s. It would force NASA to enhance debris shielding for its planned space station.

Earlier the U.S. Air Force and NASA had worked together to develop a Scout-launched target vehicle for ASAT experiments. NASA advised the U.S. Air Force on how to conduct the ASAT test to avoid producing long-lived debris. However, congressional restrictions on ASAT tests intervened.

In order to complete an ASAT test before an expected Congressional ban took effect (as it did in October 1985), the DoD chose to use the existing Solwind astrophysics satellite as a target.

NASA worked with the DoD to monitor the effects of the tests using two orbital debris telescopes and a reentry radar deployed to Alaska.

NASA assumed the torn metal would be bright. Surprisingly, the Solwind pieces turned out to appear so dark as to be almost undetectable. Only two pieces were seen. NASA Scientists theorized that the unexpected Solwind darkening was due to carbonization of organic compounds in the target satellite; that is, when the kinetic energy of the projectile became heat energy on impact, the plastics inside Solwind vaporized and condensed on the metal pieces as soot.

NASA used U.S. Air Force infrared telescopes to show that the pieces were warm with heat absorbed from the Sun. This added weight to the contention that they were dark with soot and not reflective. The pieces decayed quickly from orbit, implying a large area-to-mass ratio. According to NASA, as of January 1998, 8 of 285 trackable pieces remained in orbit. The last piece of debris, COSPAR 1979-017GX, SATCAT 16564, deorbited 9 May 2004 according to SATCAT.

The Solwind test had three important results:

- It raised the possibility that the objects optical systems were detecting were large and dark, not small and bright as was generally assumed. This had implications for the calibration of optical and radar orbital debris detection systems.
- The test also created a baseline event for researchers seeking a characteristic signature of a hypervelocity collision in space.
- Awareness was raised about the orbital debris problem.

In the end, the Solwind ASAT test had few consequences for the planned U.S. space station as station completion (indeed, even the launch of first module) was pushed beyond the mid-1990s. The record-high level of solar activity during the 1989–1991 solar maximum heated and expanded the atmosphere more than anticipated in 1985, accelerating Solwind debris decay.

ASM-135 test launches
Flight number	Date	Description
1	21 January 1984	Missile successfully tested without miniature vehicle
2	13 November 1984	Missile failed when MHV was directed at a star.
3	13 September 1985	Missile successfully destroys the satellite P78-1 Solwind
4	22 August 1986	Missile successfully tested when MHV was directed at a star.
5	29 September 1986	Missile successfully tested when MHV was directed at a star.

Fifteen ASM-135 ASAT missiles were produced and five missiles were flight tested.

== Operational history ==
The United States Air Force intended to modify 20 F-15A fighters from the 318th Fighter Interceptor Squadron based at McChord Air Force Base in Washington and the 48th Fighter-Interceptor Squadron based at Langley Air Force Base in Virginia for the anti-satellite mission. Both squadrons had airframes modified to support the ASM-135 by the time the project was cancelled in 1988.

The USAF had planned to deploy an operational force of 112 ASM-135 missiles.

The deployment of the ASM-135 was central to a policy debate in the United States over the strategic need for an anti-satellite weapon and the potential for anti-satellite weapon arms control with the Soviet Union. Starting in 1983, Congress placed various restrictions on the ASM-135 program, and in December 1985, banned testing the ASM-135 on targets in space. This decision was made only a day after the Air Force sent two target satellites into orbit for its next round of tests, USA 13 and USA 14. The Air Force continued to test the ASAT system in 1986, but stayed within the limits of the ban by not engaging a space-borne target.

In the same year the deployment of the ASM-135 was estimated to cost $US5.3 billion up from the original $US500 million estimate. The USAF scaled back the ASM-135 program by two-thirds in attempt to control costs. The USAF also never strongly supported the program and proposed canceling the program in 1987. In 1988, the Reagan Administration canceled the ASM-135 program because of technical problems, testing delays, and significant cost growth.

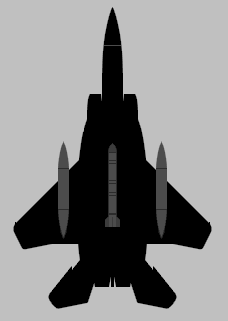
Drawing of an F-15A with an ASM-135 mounted on its centerline pylon

== Variants ==
- ASM-135 – 15 missiles produced.
- CASM-135 – Captive carry version of ASM-135A with warhead simulator and inert motors.

== Operators ==
United States

- United States Air Force

== Survivors ==
- CASM-135 currently on display at the Steven F. Udvar-Hazy Center, part of the Smithsonian National Air and Space Museum (NASM)'s annex at Washington Dulles International Airport in Chantilly, Virginia, United States.
- CASM-135 currently on display at the National Museum of the United States Air Force, Wright-Patterson Air Force Base, Dayton, Ohio, United States.

== See also ==
- RIM-161 Standard Missile 3, a US Navy missile with anti-satellite capability
- Bold Orion
- High Virgo
- Lockheed Martin ALHTK
- NOTS-EV-1 Pilot
- NOTS-EV-2 Caleb
- Terra-3

Related lists

- List of missiles
