= Wilbert Pearson =

American Air Force general

Wilbert D. Pearson Jr.
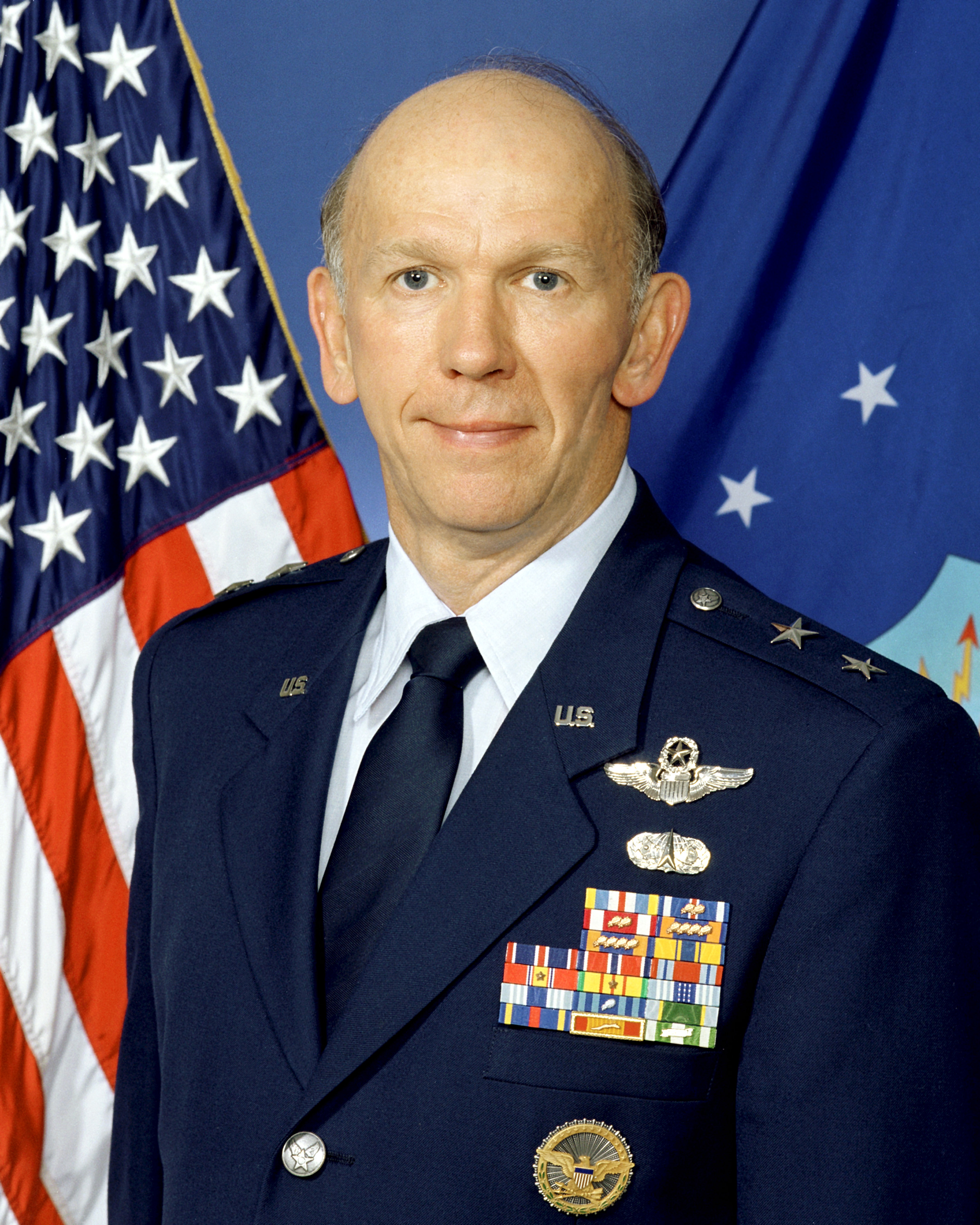
- Allegiance: United States
- Branch: United States Air Force
- Service years: 1970 - 2005
- Rank: Major General
- Commands: Air Force Flight Test Center; 6512th Test Squadron

Wilbert "Doug" Pearson Jr. is a retired major general and test pilot in the United States Air Force. On September 13, 1985, he conducted the test launch of an ASM-135 ASAT missile that destroyed the Solwind satellite. He later served as the director of operations for Air Force Materiel Command and as the commander of the Air Force Flight Test Center. Pearson retired from active duty on January 1, 2005.

== Personal life ==
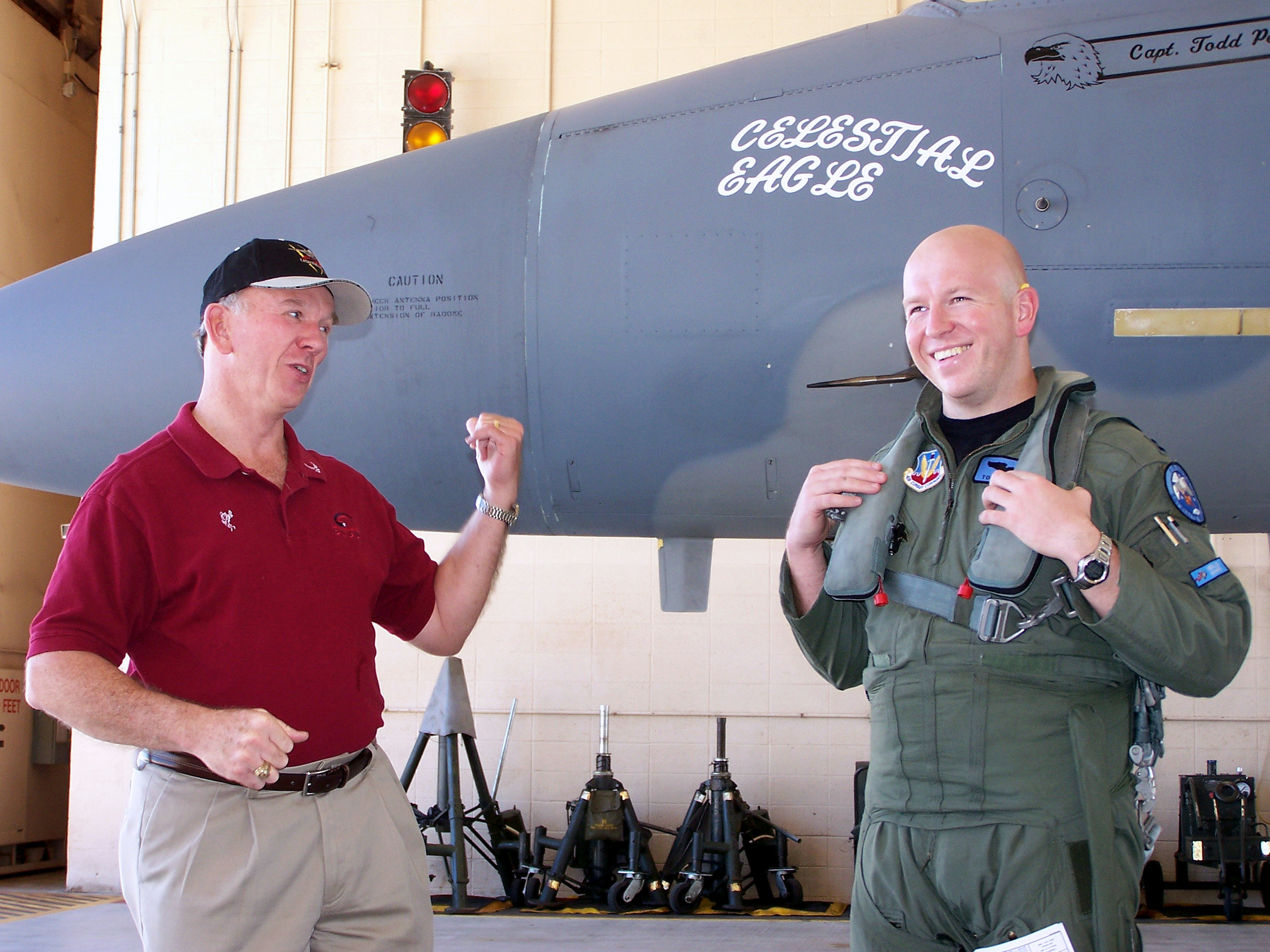
Doug and Todd Pearson in front of the F-15 for a commemorative flight

Pearson's son, Todd, was the commander of the 493rd Fighter Squadron at RAF Lakenheath. In 2007, Todd flew the F-15 Eagle that was used for the ASM-135 test launch in a commemorative flight.

== Dates of promotion ==
Insignia	Rank	Date
	Major general	July 1, 2001
	Brigadier general	April 1, 1997
	Colonel	Nov. 1, 1991
	Lieutenant colonel	Feb. 1, 1986
	Major	Nov. 1, 1981
	Captain	June 10, 1974
	First lieutenant	March 10, 1972
	Second lieutenant	Sept. 10, 1970
