= Koopman =

Koopman is a Dutch occupational surname that means "merchant". The spelling Coopman is more common in West Flanders. Notable people with the surname include:

== Koopman ==
- Bernard Koopman (1900–1981), French-born American mathematician
  - known for a.o.: Koopman operator, Koopman–von Neumann classical mechanics, Pitman-Koopman theorem
- Bertha Koopman (married name Bertha Frensel Wegener; 1874–1953), Dutch composer and music educator
- Bram Koopman (1917–2008), Dutch Labour Party politician
- Cheryl Koopman (1950—2019), American social psychologist, behavioral scientist, and international relations scholar
- Emy Koopman (born 1985), Dutch writer and journalist
- Elias Bernard Koopman (1860–1929), founder of the American Mutoscope and Biograph Company
- Elisabeth Koopman Hevelius (1647–1693), German astronomer with Dutch parents, wife of Johannes Hevelius
  - 12625 Koopman, a Main Belt asteroid named after her
- Frederik Koopman (1887–1980), Dutch rower
- Gert Jan Koopman (born 1966), Dutch European civil servant
- Gionne Koopman (born 1991), South African cricketer
- Hilda Koopman (born 1947), Dutch-American linguist
- Jan Coenraad Koopman (1790–1855), Dutch vice-admiral
- John Koopman (1879–1949), American painter
- Karl Koopman (1920–1997), American zoologist
  - Koopman's anole, Koopman's mountain mouse, Koopman's Pipistrelle and Koopman's rat are named for him
- Kelly-Eve Koopman (born 1982), South African director and actor
- Martin Koopman (born 1956), Dutch football defender and manager
- Ody Koopman (1902–1949), Dutch tennis player, brother of Toto
- Peggy Koopman-Boyden (1943–2025), New Zealand gerontologist
- Peter Koopman (born 1959), Australian biologist
- Pim Koopman (1953–2009), Dutch musician and member of Kayak
- Rinse Koopman (1770–1826), Dutch Mennonite teacher and minister
- Roger Koopman, American politician
- Shervantaigh Koopman, (born 1994), South African professional boxer
- Ton Koopman (born 1944), Dutch conductor, organist and harpsichordist
- Toto Koopman (1908–1991), Dutch model and anti-fascist spy during World War II, sister of Ody
- Willi Koopman (born 1944), Dutch actress

== Coopman ==
- Jean-Pierre Coopman (born 1946), Flemish boxer
- Sander Coopman (born 1995), Flemish footballer
- Theophiel Coopman (1852–1915), Flemish poet

== See also ==
- Kaufmann, German equivalent
- Koopmans, Dutch surname
