= Koopmans =

Koopmans is a Dutch occupational surname meaning "merchant's". Notable people with the surname include:

- Aart Koopmans (1946–2007), Dutch businessman
- Ger Koopmans (born 1962), Dutch politician
- Leo Koopmans (born 1953), Dutch ice hockey player
- Luuk Koopmans (born 1993), Dutch football player
- Marion Koopmans (born 1956), Dutch virologist
- Rachel Koopmans, Canadian historian
- Rudy Koopmans (born 1948), Dutch boxer
- Ruud Koopmans (born 1961), Dutch sociologist

• Renno Koopmans (born 1962), IT Founder

- Thijmen Koopmans (1929–2015), Dutch judge
- Tini Koopmans (1912–1981), Dutch high jumper, discus thrower and shot putter
- Tjalling Koopmans (1910–1985), Dutch American mathematician, physicist and economist and Nobel Laureate
  - Koopmans' theorem, a quantum chemistry theorem of his

== See also ==
- Koopman
