= Koeman =

Koeman is a Dutch occupational surname. Though the name translates as "cow man" in modern Dutch, it is a derivative, via Kooman, of Koopman (= merchant). People with this name include:

== Koeman footballing family ==
- Martin Koeman (1938–2013), Dutch footballer, father of Erwin and Ronald
- Erwin Koeman (born 1961), Dutch football player and manager
- Ronald Koeman (born 1963), Dutch football player and manager
- Ronald Koeman Jr. (born 1995), Dutch football goalkeeper, son of Ronald

== Other people ==
- Lieja Koeman (born 1976), Dutch shot putter
