= Man's Favorite Sport? =

1964 film by Howard Hawks

- Theatrical release poster
- Directed by: Howard Hawks
- Screenplay by: John Fenton Murray; Steve McNeil
- Based on: "The Girl Who Almost Got Away" in Cosmopolitan magazine 1950 by Pat Frank
- Produced by: Howard Hawks
- Starring: Rock Hudson; Paula Prentiss; Maria Perschy; Charlene Holt
- Cinematography: Russell Harlan
- Edited by: Stuart Gilmore
- Music by: Henry Mancini
- Production companies: Gibraltar Productions; Laurel Productions
- Distributed by: Universal Pictures
- Release date: January 29, 1964
- Running time: 120 minutes
- Country: United States
- Language: English
- Box office: $6 million

Man's Favorite Sport? is a 1964 American screwball comedy film starring Rock Hudson and Paula Prentiss and directed and produced by Howard Hawks. Hawks intended the film to be an homage to his own 1938 screwball classic Bringing Up Baby, with Katharine Hepburn and Cary Grant, and unsuccessfully tried to recruit Hepburn and Grant to reprise their roles. The film was coproduced by Hudson through his company Gibraltar Productions.

== Plot ==
Roger Willoughby works at Abercrombie & Fitch as a salesman of recreational fishing equipment. He is successful in his profession and has a strong client base, some of whom are looking for equipment that could help them win the next annual fishing tournament at Lake Wakapoogee.

His boss, Mr. Cadwalader, orders Willoughby to participate in the tournament, something he had never done before. This request comes at the suggestion of Isolde "Easy" Mueller, the daughter of the owner of the Lake's lodge, and Abigail Page, its director of public relations and Easy's friend. They believe his participation would improve the tournament's standing and Mr. Cadwalader's business.

Willoughby initially refuses, confiding to Abigail and Easy that he has never fished in his life, cannot stand the touch or taste of fish, and cannot swim. His success comes from listening to his customers, most of whom are very talkative: he simply passes on the advice that one customer gives him to his other customers. Abigail, who is adept at fishing, threatens to expose his lack of experience if he declines her request, despite her earlier promise to keep it secret, and promises to teach him fishing before the tournament starts.

He arrives at the lodge with a ridiculously large amount of camping and fishing equipment, all of which was provided by Cadwalader. He does not know how to handle any of it and Abigail's lessons are not very successful, one ending with him almost drowning when he falls out of a boat. Easy tells them that the renowned fisherman Joe Killroy has entered the tournament. They decide to fake a broken arm for Willoughby to enable him drop out of the tournament. Abigail and Easy put an improvised cast on him, only to find out that Killroy actually had an accident and has a cast himself; they ineptly saw off Willoughby's cast, to his horror.

That night, Abigail comes to Willoughby's lodge to request a sleeping pill and lets herself in. When he has to leave to talk to some of his customers, who have arrived for the tournament and want some tips, Abigail, who had taken the sleeping pill, falls asleep in his bed. When he comes back, he decides to sleep on the floor. The next morning, Easy arrives looking for Abigail. When she tries to help Willoughby open the zipper of his sleeping bag, his fiancée Tex arrives. She is at first amused at the sight but when Abigail comes out of his bedroom, she storms off.

When the three-day tournament starts, Willoughby is still incompetent but, by sheer luck, catches some large fish which make him very competitive. On one of the nights, he walks Abigail to her lodge and they kiss. Even though the kiss clearly impresses her, she acts as if it was a disappointment, confusing and angering him.

On the third day, luck causes him to catch another large fish, winning the tournament. That evening, a tearful Abigail comes to his lodge. She apologizes for getting him in so much trouble and begs him to refuse the prize and come clean with his boss, the tournament director and his customers. After she leaves, he admits that he was going to do that anyway but that she made it easier for him. He gathers everyone and confesses. While his boss fires him, everyone else is impressed by his honesty.

Willoughby then goes to look for Abigail, who went camping across the lake to be alone. He finds her and they bicker until a storm forces them to share her tent, where they fall asleep, still angry. Meanwhile, the competitors convince Cadwalader that he has to rehire Willoughby for business reasons: when it emerges that even a totally incompetent fisherman can win such a tournament with Cadwalader's equipment, people will want to buy it.

Cadwalader goes out on the lake to search for Willoughby. The storm meanwhile has flushed Abigail's tent out to the lake where they are met by Cadwalader's boat. After they hear the good news, Abigail and Willoughby happily kiss again.

== Cast ==
- Rock Hudson as Roger Willoughby
- Paula Prentiss as Abigail Page
- Maria Perschy as Isolde "Easy" Mueller
- John McGiver as Cadwalader
- Charlene Holt as Tex
- Roscoe Karns as Major Phipps
- James Westerfield as Policeman
- Norman Alden as John Screaming Eagle
- Forrest Lewis as Skaggs
- Regis Toomey as Bagley
- Tyler McVey as Customer Bush
- Kathie Browne as Marcia

== Production ==
Man's Favorite Sport? was the first in a three-picture deal Hawks had signed with Paramount. In March 1962, Hawks reported that John Fenton Murray was working on the script. The story idea was based on a magazine article that Hawks had read about a fishing expert who had never been fishing.

In July, Hawks said that the film would star Cary Grant and a French actress and that the other films in his deal would be Bengal Tiger and Yukon Trail. According to Hawks, Grant turned down the role because he felt that he was too old to appear opposite three young women.

By November, the stars were Rock Hudson and Paula Prentiss. The second female lead, Maria Perschy, was a discovery of Hawks'. Another newcomer was model Charlene Holt.

Hawks called the film "as broad a comedy as has been filmed in many years. Yet it's believable."

Filming took place in January 1963. Hawks said that Hudson "... tried hard and he worked hard and he did everything he could but Rock is not a comedian. And when you have visualized one person in it and you're trying to get that, it's an awful tough job to do it because you just don't come out right. And even then we ended up with a pretty good picture."

Hawks liked Prentiss, saying "she ought to be a big comedy star. I don't know what's the matter." Hawks said that the film previewed successfully but that Universal wanted 20 minutes removed to enable an extra screening per day. He claims that the edited film did not preview as well, so Universal excised another 20 minutes, and that was the version that was released.

== Release ==
=== Box office ===
The film was released on February 5, 1964, eventually grossing $6 million at the box office, while earning $3,000,000 in US theatrical rentals. It was the 24th highest-grossing film of 1964.

=== Critical reception ===
The critics' reactions were somewhat tepid, particularly in comparison to Hawks' earlier works, though Molly Haskell wrote a glowing analysis of the picture seven years later in The Village Voice. Haskell admitted an indifference to the film in 1964, and that upon revisiting the film in 1971 she was "both delighted and deeply moved by the film—delighted by the grace and real humor with which the story was told, and moved by the reverberation of the whole substratum of meaning, of sexual antagonism, desire, and despair."

Hudson was given relatively sympathetic reviews for the difficult position of impersonating Cary Grant. Robin Wood notes: "It was cruel to make [Hudson] repeat the night-club scene from Bringing up Baby which Cary Grant brought off with such panache."

Prentiss was especially praised for her performance. "Miss Prentiss slips ... agreeably into Katharine Hepburn's shoes. Her bass voice is comically imposing. She's more consciously malevolent/charming than Miss Hepburn in Baby. She's just terrible to Hudson and her outrageousness almost makes the movie half a good comedy." Robin Wood: "Paula Prentiss is—as always—very good, but at times one has the feeling that Hawks is importing a characterization on her instead of working with her." Filmink called Prentiss "one of Hawks’ best female leads" and argued "the film is maligned among some Hawks auterists and it’s not one of his top efforts but it’s bright and colourful with a sense of relaxed camaraderie that is very winning."

Hawks would later say: "Paula Prentiss was good, but she couldn't remember what she was doing from one shot to the next. Her shots never matched".

On the review aggregator website Rotten Tomatoes, 70% of 10 critics' reviews are positive, with an average rating of 6.5/10.

== See also ==
- List of American films of 1964
