= El Dorado (1966 film) =

1966 film

- Theatrical release poster
- Directed by: Howard Hawks
- Screenplay by: Leigh Brackett
- Based on: The Stars in Their Courses; 1960 novel by Harry Brown
- Produced by: Howard Hawks
- Starring: John Wayne; Robert Mitchum; James Caan; Charlene Holt; Paul Fix; Arthur Hunnicutt; Michele Carey
- Cinematography: Harold Rosson
- Edited by: John Woodcock
- Music by: Nelson Riddle
- Production company: Laurel Productions
- Distributed by: Paramount Pictures
- Release dates: December 17, 1966 (Japan); June 7, 1967 (USA)
- Running time: 126 minutes
- Country: United States
- Language: English
- Budget: $4,653,000
- Box office: $5,950,000 (US/ Canada) (Note: These figures refer to rentals accruing to the distributors.)

El Dorado is a 1966 American Western film directed and produced by Howard Hawks and starring John Wayne and Robert Mitchum. Written by Leigh Brackett and loosely based on the novel The Stars in Their Courses by Harry Brown, the film is about a gunfighter who comes to the aid of an old friend who is a drunken sheriff struggling to defend a rancher and his family against another rancher trying to steal their water. The supporting cast features James Caan, Charlene Holt, Paul Fix, Arthur Hunnicutt, Michele Carey, R. G. Armstrong, Ed Asner, Christopher George, Adam Roarke, and Jim Davis.

The film was first released in Japan on December 17, 1966, and then in the United States on June 7, 1967. The film received critical praise and was commercially successful, generating North American rentals of $5,950,000 on box-office receipts of $12 million.

== Plot ==
J.P. Harrah is sheriff of the town of El Dorado and observes that his old friend, gun-for-hire Cole Thornton, has just arrived in response to a mysterious job offer from wealthy landowner Bart Jason. Harrah reveals to Thornton that Jason is actually trying to muscle the honest MacDonald family from their land, and that Thornton's job will entail "taking care of" Harrah. Thornton agrees to turn down the job and rides out to Jason's ranch to tell him so.

Kevin MacDonald and his family hear about Thornton's arrival and fear the worst. The youngest son Luke is made sentry, but falls asleep at his post. As Thornton returns from his confrontation with Jason, Luke is startled awake and fires. Thornton reflexively fires back and wounds Luke in the stomach, and Luke commits suicide before Thornton can stop him, believing his wound fatal. Feeling guilty, Thornton brings the body to the farmhouse and tells Kevin what happened. The only daughter of the MacDonald clan, Joey, rides off before she can hear the truth, and shoots Thornton on his way back to town. Thornton survives, but the bullet has lodged against his spine. Local medic Doc Miller cannot remove it, so Thornton departs after healing, despite the protests of local saloon owner Maudie, who has feelings for him. Over time, the bullet in his back presses against his spine, causing bouts of temporary paralysis in his right side.

Six months later, Thornton is in a saloon out of town, having avoided El Dorado. He witnesses a naive young man, Alan Bourdillion Traherne ("Mississippi"), confronting and killing Charlie Hagan, who killed Mississippi's foster father, Johnny Diamond, two years earlier. Thornton steps in to save Mississippi from retaliation from Charlie's friends, Milt and Pedro. Their employer, famed gunslinger Nelse McLeod, is impressed, and offers Thornton a job in El Dorado, revealing that he has accepted Bart Jason's job offer and that Harrah became a drunk after a girl ran out on him.

Thornton refuses McLeod, and Mississippi and he return to El Dorado ahead of McLeod. They meet with Maudie and Harrah's deputy, Bull, who confirm Nelse's story. After a fistfight with the drunken Harrah, Thornton agrees to use a sobering concoction made by Mississippi to bring Harrah around, with violently effective results. Harrah, ashamed to be the laughingstock that he has become, agrees to stay sober.

Three men shoot and badly wound Kevin MacDonald's son Jared; Thornton, Bull, Mississippi, and Harrah hunt the men into an old church, and gun them down. One man escapes, leading them straight to Jason, whom Harrah arrests and holds for trial. Mississippi stops Joey from killing Jason on the walk back to the jail.

Bull officially deputizes Mississippi and Thornton. They patrol the town to keep the peace, stopping an attempted attack by McLeod's gang on the jail, during which Harrah is hobbled by a bullet to the leg. Maudie brings them some supplies while they are holed up in the jail, and McLeod's men start harassing her patrons and her. Thornton and Mississippi go to rescue them, but Thornton suffers an attack of paralysis and is captured by McLeod. Harrah agrees to trade Jason for Thornton and leave town, despite Thornton's protests.

Jason and McLeod's men kidnap Saul MacDonald and demand that Kevin turn over his water rights for the return of his son. Rightly suspecting that Jason will kill both Saul and Kevin once he has the water rights, Thornton rides a wagon up to the front door of Jason's saloon, while Harrah, Bull, and Mississippi sneak in the back. Bull shoots one of McLeod's men with an arrow, then blows his bugle, distracting the others while signaling Thornton. Thornton opens fire, killing McLeod, while the rest free Saul. Joey shoots Jason, saving Thornton from being shot and making amends for her previous mistake. Doc Miller's new assistant, Dr. Donovan, agrees to operate on Thornton if he stays in town, and Thornton implies that he may stop wandering to stay with Maudie.

== Cast ==
- John Wayne as Cole Thornton
- Robert Mitchum as Sheriff J.P. Harrah
- James Caan as Alan Bourdillion Traherne, nicknamed "Mississippi"
- Charlene Holt as Maudie
- Paul Fix as Dr. Miller
- Arthur Hunnicutt as Bull Harris
- Michele Carey as Josephine "Joey" MacDonald
- R. G. Armstrong as Kevin MacDonald
- Ed Asner as Bart Jason
- Christopher George as Nelse McLeod
- Marina Ghane as Maria
- Robert Donner as Milt
- John Gabriel as Pedro
- Johnny Crawford as Luke MacDonald
- Adam Roarke as Matt MacDonald
- Jim Davis as Jim Purvis, Bart Jason's foreman
- Olaf Wieghorst as Swede Larsen, gunsmith
- John Mitchum as Elmer, Jason's bartender (uncredited)
- Chuck Roberson as Jason's gunman (uncredited)
- William Henry as Sheriff Dodd Draper (uncredited)
- Don Collier as Deputy Joe Braddock (uncredited)
- Dean Smith as Charlie Hagan (uncredited)
- Anthony Rogers as Dr. Charles Donovan (uncredited)

Wayne's horse was a six-year-old Appaloosa stallion named Zip.

== Production ==
Leigh Brackett wrote the original script, which she described as "the best script I had ever done in my life. It wasn't tragic, but it was one of those things where Wayne died at the end." However, she said that as production neared, "the more we got into doing Rio Bravo over again, the sicker I got, because I hate doing things over again. And I kept saying to Howard I did that, and he'd say it was okay, we could do it over again."

Mitchum later said: "When Howard called me, I said, 'What's the story?' and he said, 'No story, just characters' and that's the way it was. Did one scene, put it away, did another, put it away."

Cinematographer Harold Rosson had retired in 1958, but Hawks persuaded him to come back to work. After making the film, Rosson resumed his retirement permanently. El Dorado was shot in Technicolor at Old Tucson Studios just west of Tucson, Arizona, and in and around Kanab, Utah, from October 1965 to January 1966.

The film was Wayne's 138th picture and was filmed before The War Wagon, but its release was delayed so that Paramount's Nevada Smith with Steve McQueen would not have to compete with a John Wayne film at the box office. El Dorado finally reached the theatres in June 1967, a month after The War Wagon had opened. The film was the only screen pairing between Wayne and Mitchum, though they both appear separately in The Longest Day (1962).

El Dorado is the second of three films directed by Hawks about a sheriff defending his office against belligerent outlaw elements, coming after Rio Bravo (1959) and before Rio Lobo (1970), both also starring Wayne in similar roles.

The poem repeated in the film and paraphrased in the theme song is "Eldorado", a ballad poem by Edgar Allan Poe. The paintings in the credits are those of artist Olaf Wieghorst, who makes a brief appearance as Swede Larsen in the film. The musical score was composed by Nelson Riddle. Footage from El Dorado was later incorporated into the opening montage of Wayne's final film, The Shootist, to illustrate the backstory of Wayne's character.

== Reception and legacy ==
=== Critical reception ===
In a contemporary review for The New York Times, critic Howard Thompson praised El Dorado as "... a tough, laconic and amusing Western that ambles across the screen as easily as the two veteran stars. ... [T]he barbed, pungent and frequently funny dialogue, plus some murderous gun forays, add up to crisp entertainment."

Roger Ebert awarded the film three and a half stars, stating: "El Dorado is a tightly directed, humorous, altogether successful Western, turned out almost effortlessly, it would seem, by three old pros: John Wayne, Robert Mitchum, and director Howard Hawks."

The film has a 96% approval rating on review compiler Rotten Tomatoes based on 25 reviews, with a weighted average of 7.7/10.

Members of the Western Writers of America chose the film's theme as one of the top-100 Western songs of all time.

=== Comic-book adaptation ===
- Dell Movie Classic: El Dorado (October 1967)

== See also ==
- List of American films of 1967
- List of American films of 1966
- John Wayne filmography
