= Solwind =

Artificial satellite, US Department of Defense

Solwind / P78-1
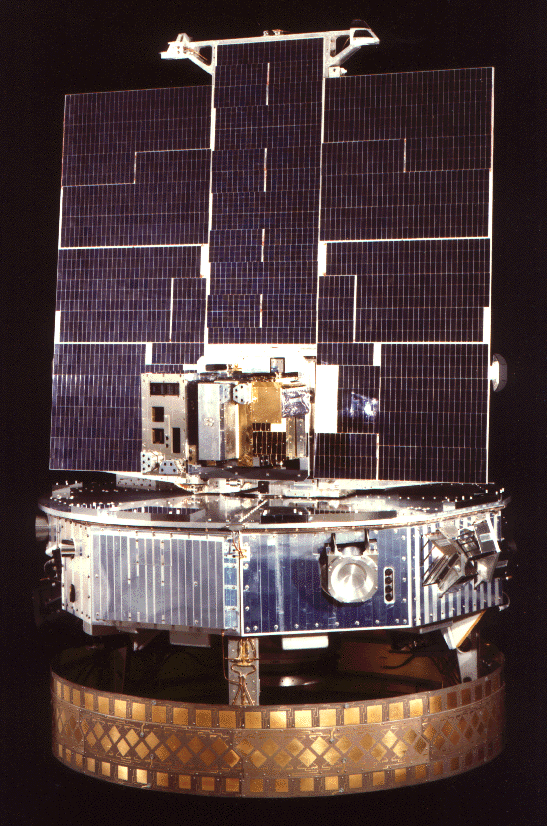
- The P78-1
- Mission type: Solar physics
- Operator: DoD Space Test Program
- COSPAR ID: 1979-017A
- SATCAT no.: 11278
- Mission duration: 6 years, 6 months, 20 days

Spacecraft properties
- Manufacturer: Ball Aerospace
- Launch mass: 1,331 kilograms (2,934 lb)
- Dry mass: 850 kilograms (1,870 lb)

Start of mission
- Launch date: February 24, 1979, 08:24:00 UTC
- Rocket: Atlas F-OIS
- Launch site: Vandenberg, SLC-3W

End of mission
- Disposal: Destroyed by ASAT
- Destroyed: September 13, 1985

Orbital parameters
- Reference system: Sun-synchronous
- Regime: Low Earth
- Eccentricity: .0022038
- Perigee altitude: 515 kilometres (320 mi)
- Apogee altitude: 545 kilometres (339 mi)
- Inclination: 97.6346°
- RAAN: 182.5017
- Argument of perigee: 99.6346
- Mean anomaly: 260.9644
- Mean motion: 15.11755304
- Epoch: 1985 09 13.72413718

Instruments
- Gamma-ray spectrometer, a white light spectrograph, an extreme ultraviolet spectrometer, a high latitude particle spectrometer, an aerosol monitor, and an X-ray monitor

P78-1 or Solwind was a United States satellite launched aboard an Atlas F rocket from Vandenberg Air Force Base in California on February 24, 1979. The satellite's mission was extended by several weeks, so that it operated until it was destroyed in orbit on September 13, 1985, to test the ASM-135 ASAT anti-satellite missile.

== Construction and payload ==
The satellite's Orbiting Solar Observatory (OSO) platform included a solar-oriented sail and a rotating wheel section. Ball Aerospace was the primary contractor for design and construction, and provided the attitude control and determination computer programs. The P78-1 carried a gamma-ray spectrometer, a white-light coronagraph, an extreme-ultraviolet imager, an X-ray spectrometer, a high-latitude particle spectrometer, an aerosol monitor, and an X-ray monitor. The X-ray monitor, designated NRL-608 or XMON, was a collaboration between the Naval Research Laboratory and Los Alamos National Laboratory. The white-light coronagraph and the ultraviolet imager were combined in a single package, designated NRL-401 or SOLWIND, which was built by the Naval Research Laboratory. The coronagraph was the flight spare of the white-light coronagraph on the OSO-7 satellite. The ultraviolet imager used a CCD imager, one of the first uses of a CCD in space.

== Discovery of comets ==
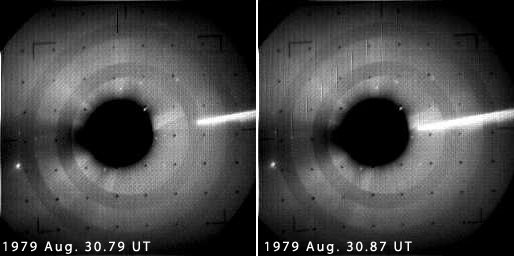
Two images of C/1979 Q1 (Solwind) on 30 August 1979

P78-1 was the first satellite in space to discover a comet in general and a sungrazing comet in particular. In total, 9 sungrazing comets, all belonging to the Kreutz group, were discovered on images taken by the Solwind coronagraph:

Designation	Solwind #	Image date	Discovery date	Discoverer
C/1979 Q1 (Solwind)	1	30 Aug 1979	Sep 1981	R. Howard, N. Koomen and D. J. Michels
C/1981 B1 (Solwind)	2	27 Jan 1981		D. J. Michels, N. Sheeley, O. Roberts, and F. Harlow
C/1981 O1 (Solwind)	3	20 Jul 1981		D. J. Michels, R. Seal, R. Chaimson, and W. Funk
C/1981 V1 (Solwind)	4	4 Nov 1981		D. J. Michels, R. Seal, R. Chaimson, and W. Funk
C/1981 W1 (Solwind)	7	20 Nov 1981	30 Jun 2005	Rainer Kracht
C/1983 N2 (Solwind)	8	7 Jul 1983	19 Jul 2005	Rainer Kracht
C/1983 S2 (Solwind)	6	25 Sep 1983		R. Howard, M. Koomen, D. Michels, and N. Sheeley
C/1984 O2 (Solwind)	5	28 Jul 1984		N. R. Sheeley, Jr., R. Howard, M. Koomen, and D. Michels
C/1984 Q1 (Solwind)	9	23 Aug 1984	22 Jul 2005	Rainer Kracht

Apart from these yet another comet C/1984 R1 (Solwind) was found by Rainer Kracht, a German amateur astronomer, on 23 July 2005 in Solwind's images of 17 Sep 1984. Its perihelion distance of 0.1051 AU was at least ten times larger than that of the previously found true sungrazers.

Designation	Solwind #	Image date	Discovery date	Discoverer
C/1984 R1 (Solwind)	10	17 Sep 1984	23 Jul 2005	Rainer Kracht

== Destruction ==
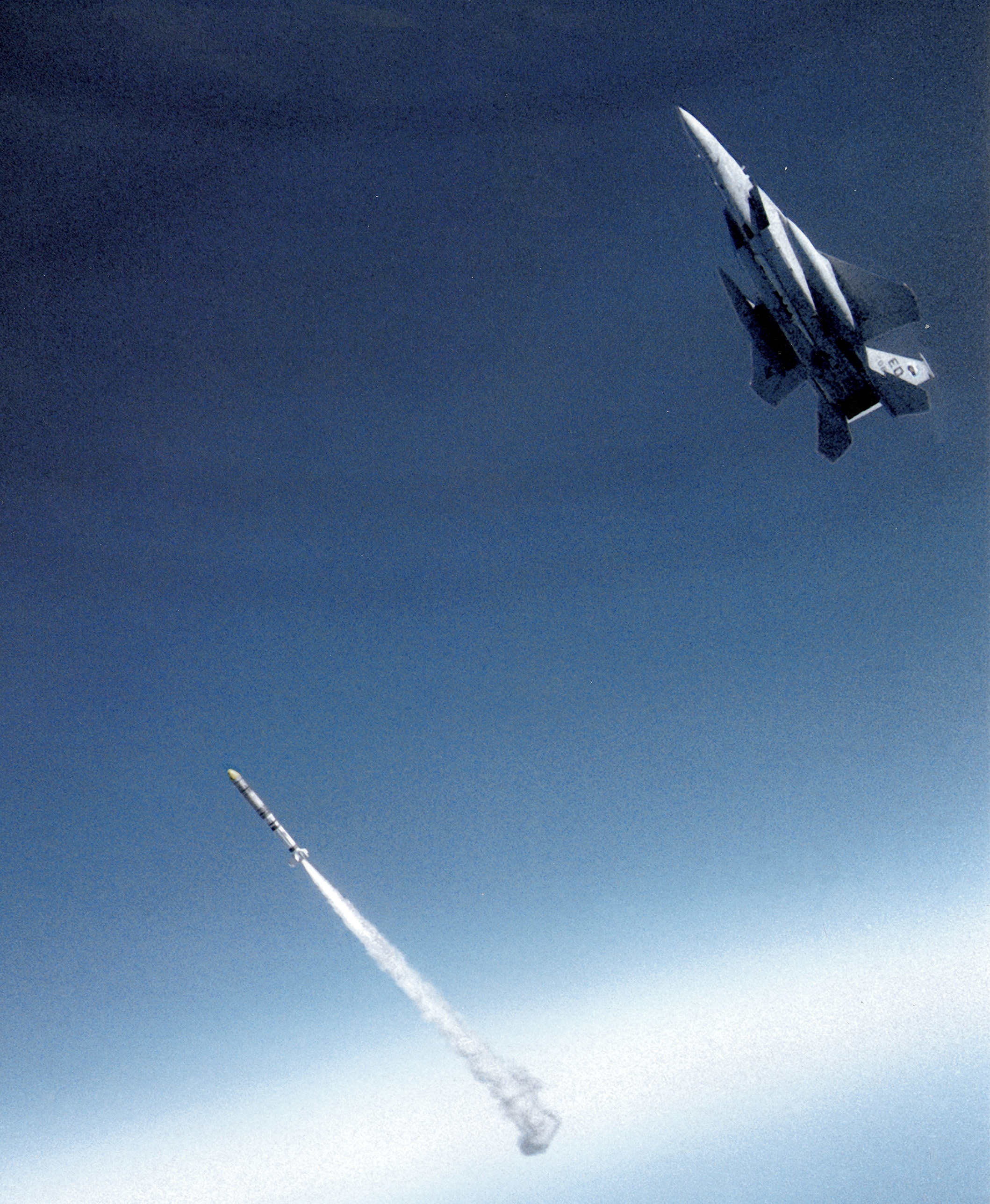
F-15A Celestial Eagle launching the ASAT missile that destroyed the P78-1

By 1985, the satellite's batteries were degrading. This caused more and more frequent "under-voltage cutoffs", a condition where the satellite detected a low main bus voltage and automatically shut down all non-vital systems. In addition, the last of the three tape recorders failed in the spring of 1985, so data collection could only occur while the spacecraft was in contact with a ground station. A normal contact lasted only about 15 minutes, so this was a serious impediment. Special arrangements could be made to string several contacts together. As a result of these failures, ever-increasing amounts of time and network resources were spent reconfiguring the satellite for normal operation. Data collection from the few remaining payloads was severely limited. Because of the additional burden on the Air Force Satellite Control Network (e.g., extra support and antenna time at the tracking stations), discussions were already underway to terminate the mission.

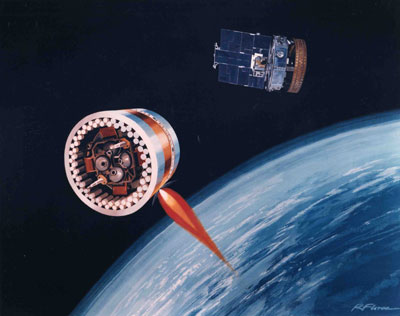
Artists impression of Solwind intercepted by an ASM-135

This led to the satellite being chosen as a test target for an ASM-135 ASAT anti-satellite missile. The mission was extended for several weeks solely to support the test. During this final phase, the satellite was often allowed to remain in the under-voltage condition for several days at a time.

On September 13, 1985, the satellite was destroyed in orbit at 20:43 UTC at 35°N 126°W with an altitude of 525 kilometres (326 mi) by an ASM-135 ASAT launched from a US Air Force F-15 Eagle fighter aircraft. The test resulted in 285 cataloged pieces of orbital debris. 1 piece of debris remained in orbit to at least May 2004, but had deorbited by 2008. The last piece of debris, COSPAR 1979-017GX, SATCAT 16564, deorbited 9 May 2004 according to SATCAT.

The test outraged some scientists because although five of P78-1's instruments had failed at the time of the test, two instruments remained in operation, and the satellite was what one solar physicist called "the backbone of coronal research through the last seven years".

== See also ==
- 2007 Chinese anti-satellite missile test
- USA 193
