= John Koopman =

American painter

- Born: June 15, 1879; Falmouth, Michigan, United States
- Died: September 16, 1949 (aged 70); Saugerties, New York, United States
- Occupation: Painter

John Koopman (June 15, 1879 – September 16, 1949) was an American painter. His work was part of the painting event in the art competition at the 1932 Summer Olympics.
