= Rachel Koopmans =

American-Canadian historian

Academic background
- Education: B.A., English, Calvin College; PhD, University of Notre Dame
- Thesis: Dispute, Control and Individual Voice: The Making of Miracles at Christ Church, Canterbury, 1080–1220

Academic work
- Discipline: Medieval history
- Sub-discipline: Canterbury Cathedral glass windows
- Institutions: Arizona State University; York University

Rachel M. Koopmans is an American–Canadian academic and author specializing in medieval history. She is an associate professor of history at York University and a member of the College of New Scholars of the Royal Society of Canada. She was part of a research team that discovered that two stained glass panels at the Canterbury Cathedral, thought to be late Victorian panels, instead dated to the 1180s.

== Education ==
Koopmans attended Calvin College where she majored in English before earning her doctorate at the University of Notre Dame under John Van Engen. In her sophomore year at Calvin College, Koopmans became interested in medieval history and began to pursue that as a career.

In 1998, as a graduate student at Notre Dame, Koopmans was awarded the Dolores Zohrab Liebmann Fund. She wrote her dissertation in 2001 titled Dispute, Control and Individual Voice: The Making of Miracles at Christ Church, Canterbury, 1080–1220.

== Academic career ==
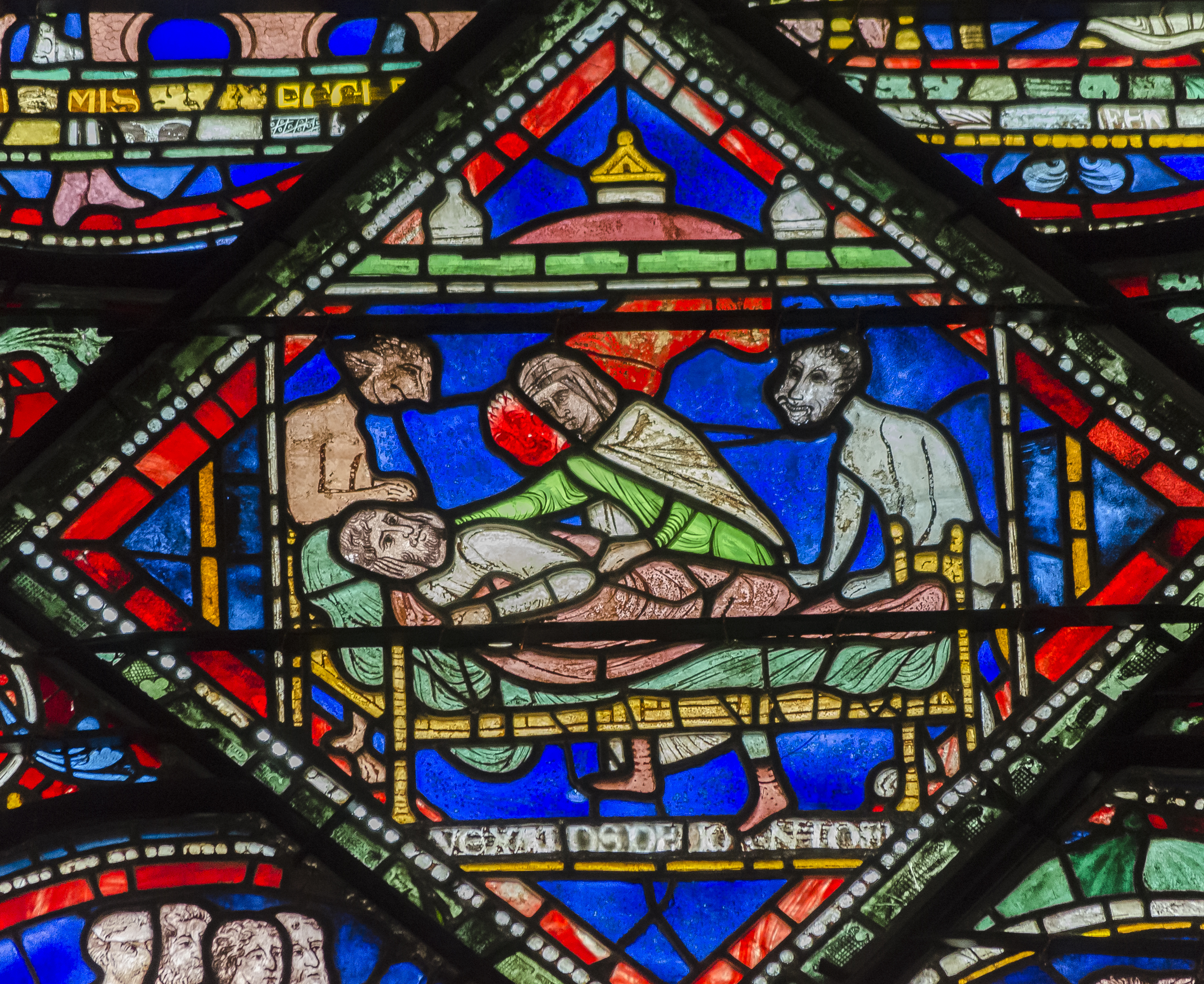
One of the stained-glass windows at Canterbury Cathedral studied by Koopmans' team

After earning her PhD, Koopmans accepted a tenure-track position in the history department at Arizona State University (ASU), and began to research Canterbury Cathedral and its stained glass windows. In 2006, Koopmans became assistant professor at York University in Toronto, Ontario, Canada, and was tenured by 2010.

In 2007, Koopmans attended a seminar on the theme of Cathedral and Culture in Medieval York. She credits this seminar as beginning her deep interest in stained glass. In 2011, Koopmans reworked her dissertation into her first published book, Wonderful to Relate: Miracle Stories and Miracle Collecting in High Medieval England, which was published by Penn UP and received the 2012 Margaret Wade Labarge prize from the Canadian Society of Medievalists.

In 2016, Koopmans was elected to the College of New Scholars of the Royal Society of Canada for her research into medieval religious culture. The following year she was recognized by York University as a Research Leader in the Faculty of Liberal Arts & Professional Studies.

In August 2018, Koopmans earned a Visiting Fellowship from The British Academy to start the first full-scale examination of the eight "miracle windows" of Canterbury Cathedral. She was part of a research team that discovered that two of the panels, up till then thought to be late Victorian, instead dated to the 1180s. One of these panels is the earliest known depiction of pilgrims on the road to Canterbury, predating Chaucer's The Canterbury Tales by two centuries.

== Awards ==
While at ASU, Koopmans was awarded the Van Courtlandt Elliott Prize from the Medieval Academy of America for her article "The Conclusion of Christina of Markyate's Vita" and won the 2004–05 ACMRS Faculty Fellows Program Award.

In 2012, Koopmans was awarded the Margaret Wade Labarge Prize from the Canadian Society of Medievalists for her book Wonderful to Relate: Miracle Stories and Miracle Collecting in High Medieval England. Koopmans was later awarded an Insight Grant by the Social Sciences and Humanities Research Council of Canada for her research on the Thomas Becket "miracle windows" in the Trinity Chapel of Canterbury Cathedral. The SSHRC grant allowed her to further study the glass windows at Canterbury, including a taking a sabbatical in 2016.

== Bibliography ==
- Wonderful to relate: Miracle stories and miracle collecting in high medieval England (2011)
