= Kooman =

Kooman is a surname. Notable people with the surname include:

- Andrew Kooman (fl. early 21st century), Canadian playwright
- Michael Kooman (fl. early 21st century), American composer

== See also ==
- Kooman, 2022 Indian film
- Koopman
