= Bram Koopman =

Dutch politician

Christoffel Abraham (Bram) Koopman (born 13 February 1917 in Den Helder – died 4 October 2008 in Alkmaar) was a Dutch politician of the Labour Party (PvdA).

He was a member of the Senate from 1971 to 1978. He was also a member of the provincial parliament of North Holland.

He studied economics at the Vrije Universiteit until 1960 and received his promotion at the University of Amsterdam in economical sciences in 1977.
