= Panamenik, California =

Panamenik panámniik (Karok)
- Former settlement
- Location in California
- Coordinates: 41°18′09″N 123°32′29″W
- Country: United States
- State: California
- County: Humboldt
- Elevation: 413 ft (126 m)

Panamenik (Karok: panámniik; also Koomen and Pa-nom-nik) is a former Karok settlement in Humboldt County, California, United States. The elevation of Panamenik is 413 feet (126 m).
