= Lockheed Martin ALHTK =

Defunct military weapons system

Lockheed Martin ALHTK (sometimes spelled Lockheed Martin Air Launched Hit To Kill) was a Lockheed Martin program sponsored by the USAF and Missile Defense Agency. ALHTK mounted the PAC-3 missile on the wing of an F-15 by using an external shell in the shape of a fuel tank to house the PAC-3 missile. As a surface to air missile system the PAC-3 missile has been used successfully in operations in Iraq. The combined ALHTK system engaged ballistic missiles in both the boost and terminal phases of ballistic flight. By 2021 the project had not been adopted and was seemingly dropped by Lockheed, with no further promotional material released concerning the system since 2010.
