= C/1979 Q1 (Solwind) =

Kreutz sungrazer comet

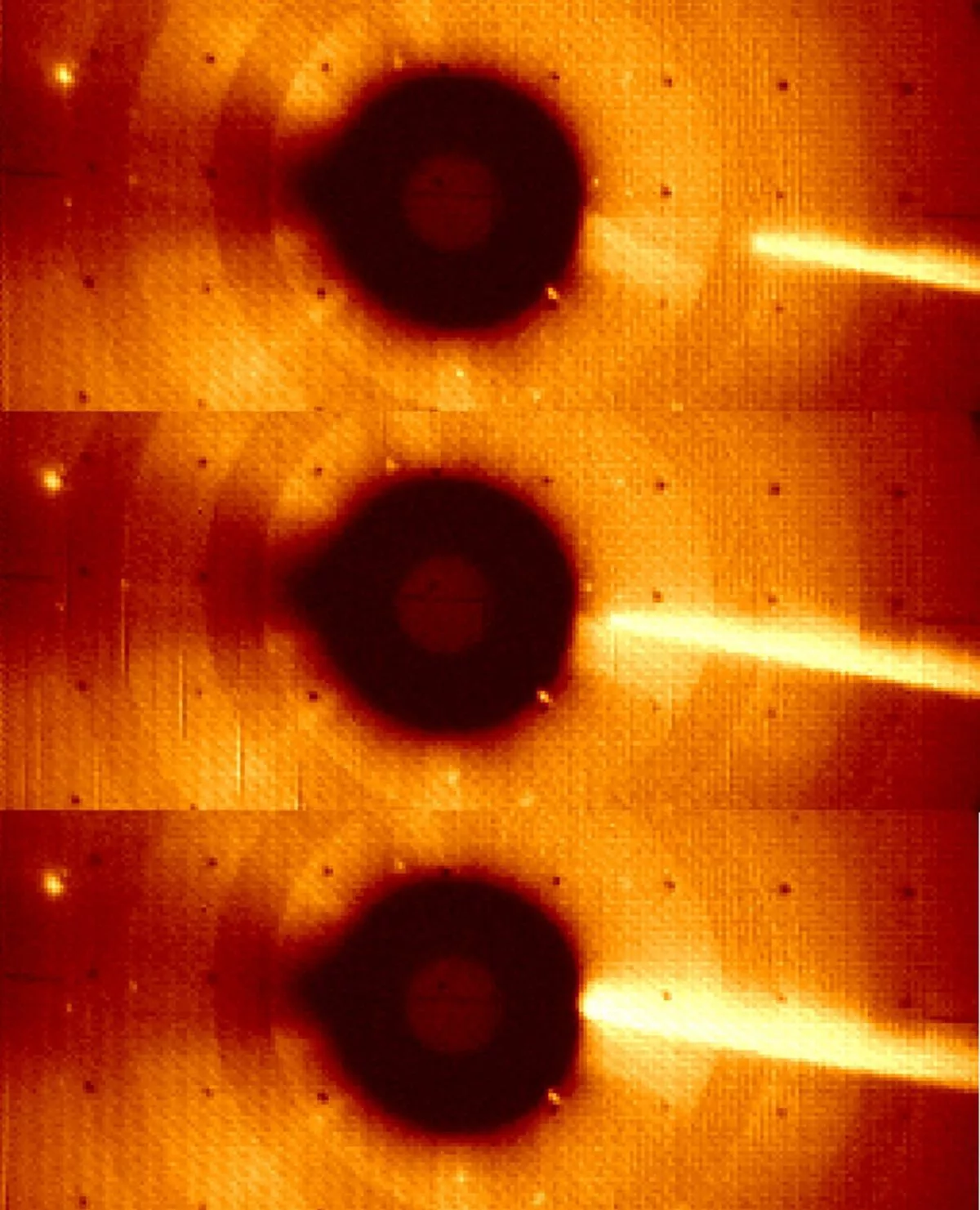
- Coronagraph images of Comet Solwind 1 plunging towards the Sun on 30 August 1979

Discovery
- Discovered by: Solwind: Russell A. Howard; Martin J. Koomen; Donald Michels
- Discovery date: September 1981

Designations
- Alternative designations: Comet Howard–Koomen–Michels; Solwind 1; 1979 XI

Orbital characteristics
- Epoch: 30 August 1979 (JD 2444116.449)
- Observation arc: 0.096 days (2.304 h)
- Number of observations: 8
- Orbit type: Kreutz sungrazer
- Perihelion: 0.0048 AU
- Eccentricity: ~1.000
- Inclination: 141.456°
- Longitude of ascending node: 344.997°
- Argument of periapsis: 67.688°
- Last perihelion: 30 August 1979

Physical characteristics
- Apparent magnitude: –4.0 (1979 apparition)

Comet Howard–Koomen–Michels, also formally known as C/1979 Q1 (Solwind), was a large sungrazing comet that collided with the Sun on 30 August 1979. It is the first comet discovered by an orbiting satellite and the only comet known to have made contact with the Sun's surface, as most bodies vaporize before impact.

== Discovery and observations ==
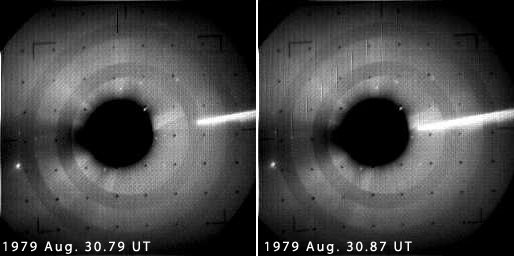
Two images of C/1979 Q1 (Solwind) on 30 August 1979

It was observed by the U.S. Naval Research Laboratory's white light coronagraph, aboard a USAF satellite codenamed P78-1, also known as Solwind, on 30 August 1979. However, it wasn't until September 1981 when a team of scientists, led by Russell Howard, Martin Koomen and Donald Michels reanalyzed Solwind data and found a "long-tailed comet as bright as Venus" in two photographs. They initially mistook it as some large erroneous streak of light caused by the camera itself before realizing it was indeed a comet. There were no confirmed ground observations of the comet at the time due to unfavorable weather conditions, though one possible coronagraph observations taken from the Lomnický štít Observatory may have revealed dim features that may be caused by the disintegrated comet's tail moving a few hours after perihelion.

Although the comet was never seen to reappear on the other side of the Sun, a notable brightening of the corona was noticed, leading astronomers to presume that it either completely disintegrated shortly before perihelion or it collided directly to the Sun's photosphere. This is the only known case of a comet that caused such brightening of the solar corona.

The very few observations of the comet has made orbital calculations for it very problematic. However, Brian G. Marsden was able to determine the comet as a member of the Kreutz sungrazers, a family of sungrazing comets believed to be fragments of the Great Comet of 371 BC. After more comets were discovered by Solwind, SolarMax, and later SOHO, the IAU later changed the convention for naming comets where a comet shall be named after a sky survey or satellite used if the object itself were discovered by a large group of people, hence the comet being renamed from Howard–Koomen–Michels into Solwind 1.
