= Willi Koopman =

Dutch actress

Willi Koopman (born 1944 in the Netherlands as Willi C. Koopman) is an actress known for Escape to Mindanao (1968), Don't Just Stand There! (1968) and It Takes a Thief (1968).
