= It Takes a Thief (1968 TV series) =

American television series (1968–1970)

- Opening title for seasons two and three
- Genre: Drama/Adventure
- Created by: Roland Kibbee
- Starring: Robert Wagner; Malachi Throne; Fred Astaire; Ed Binns
- Theme music composer: Dave Grusin
- Composers: Dave Grusin; Benny Golson; Oliver Nelson; Billy Goldenberg; Lyn Murray; Ernie Freeman
- Country of origin: United States
- Original language: English
- No. of seasons: 3
- No. of episodes: 66 (list of episodes)

Production
- Executive producers: Jack Arnold; Gordon Oliver; Frank Price
- Producers: Gene L. Coon; Leonard Horn; Glen A. Larson; Paul Mason; Winston Miller; Leslie Stevens
- Running time: 60 minutes
- Production company: Universal Television

Original release
- Network: ABC
- Release: January 9, 1968 – March 23, 1970

It Takes a Thief is an American action-adventure television series that aired on ABC for three seasons between 1968 and 1970. It stars Robert Wagner in his television debut as sophisticated thief Alexander Mundy, who works for the U.S. government in return for his release from prison. For most of the series, Malachi Throne played Noah Bain, Mundy's boss.

It was among the last of the series in the 1960s spy television genre, although Mission: Impossible continued for a few more years. It Takes a Thief was inspired by, though not based upon, the 1955 motion picture To Catch a Thief, directed by Alfred Hitchcock; both of their titles stem from the English proverb "Set a thief to catch a thief" (or as it is now more often phrased, "It takes a thief to catch a thief"). According to Wagner's autobiography, Pieces of My Heart (2008), he consulted with Cary Grant, who starred in To Catch a Thief, on how to play Alexander Mundy.

== Premise ==
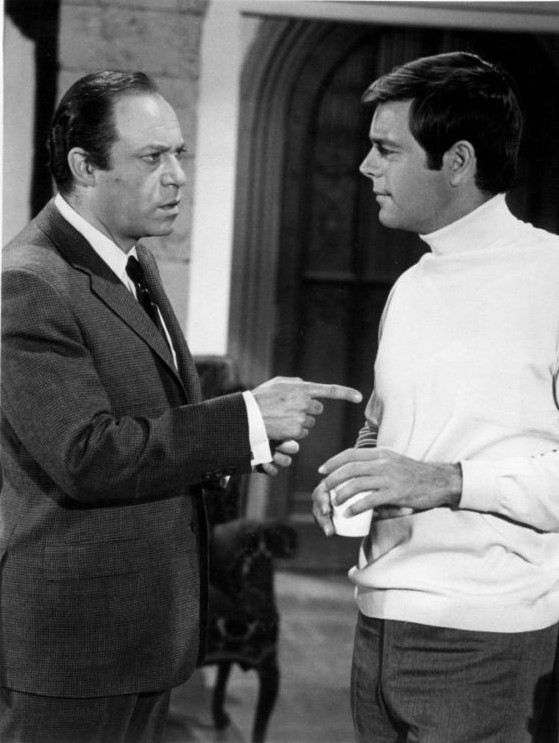
Malachi Throne with Robert Wagner in It Takes a Thief, 1968

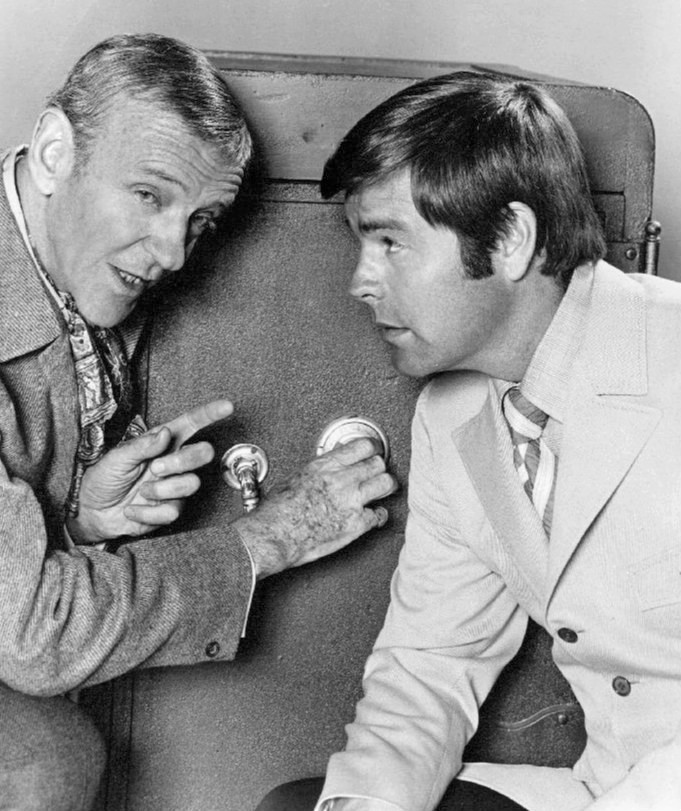
Fred Astaire and Robert Wagner, 1969

It Takes a Thief, which was created by television writer Roland Kibbee, featured the adventures of Alexander Mundy, a cat burglar, pickpocket, and thief, who steals to finance his life as a polished playboy and sophisticate. He is serving time in San Jobel prison when the U.S. government's SIA (the fictional Secret Intelligence Agency) proposes a deal to Mundy: steal for the government in exchange for his freedom. Mundy is puzzled and asks, "Let me get this straight. You want me to steal?" In the main opening titles, his new SIA boss, Noah Bain, uses the catch phrase, "Oh, look, Al, I'm not asking you to spy. I'm just asking you to steal." In pre-production, the title for a while was Once a Crook.

The series opened with its pilot episode, a ninety-minute (with commercials) special premiere titled "A Thief Is a Thief Is a Thief", written by Kibbee and directed by Leslie Stevens. When the series was released in syndication in the 1970s, the pilot episode was withheld from the package and was expanded into a 99-minute feature film for overseas release; this was eventually released in a separate domestic syndication package, under the title Magnificent Thief. The pilot feature film version was released on home video in the 1990s.

In the series' third season, Throne was replaced by Edward Binns as Mundy's SIA boss, Wally Powers, in some episodes. As Throne explained: "They had this idea of shooting the whole season in Italy, but they wanted me to stay behind and give Wagner's character ... orders over the phone. I told them if I didn't go I'd quit, and I did. The show didn't last another half a season." Throne's version of events was incorrect, as the third season was not shortened. In the end, portions of season three were filmed in Europe and Binns, Throne's replacement, filmed some scenes there.

Also during the third season, Fred Astaire played Alistair Mundy, Alexander's father, in five episodes (four on screen, one voiceover that is not credited). Alistair is also a master gentleman-thief, who says bemusedly, at the start of each episode in which he appears, "I've heard of stealing from the government, but for the government?" Alistair was the lead character in most episodes in which he appeared, rather than Wagner's character of Alexander, who was relegated to supporting or even cameo roles in these episodes. This is somewhat reminiscent of the way the 1950s TV series Maverick would introduce a relative of the previously established main character, and then alternate the two characters the leading series role from week to week. It was creator Roland Kibbee's idea to have a semiregular on the show who was related to Wagner's character, Alexander Mundy. The idea of Fred Astaire playing Alister Mundy came from Wagner's wardrobe man Hugie McFarland, who also handled wardrobe for Astaire as well as for John Forsythe. Astaire was paid $25,000 per episode he appeared in, a tidy sum for 1970.

Producer Glen Larson came up with the idea of how to introduce Alistair Mundy according to Wagner's autobiography, Pieces of My Heart. Astaire's character makes his first appearance in the third season, episode four, titled "The Great Casino Caper". This episode was shot in Venice. The story line was that Alistair had become estranged from Al because earlier in his career Al had been caught and was serving time in prison. This greatly disappointed Alistair. In the episode all is forgiven and they team up to rob a casino. This formula where father and son team up to pull off a heist was often repeated when Alistair Mundy appeared.

Susan Saint James appeared in five episodes. Charlene Holt appeared in three episodes. Ricardo Montalbán appeared in two episodes. Stefanie Powers (Robert Wagner's future costar in the later series Hart to Hart) appeared in one third-season episode. Other guest stars included prominent veteran Hollywood movie stars such as Bette Davis, Gale Sondergaard, Joseph Cotten, Elsa Lanchester, Hermione Gingold, Paul Henreid, Fernando Lamas, and Ida Lupino.

== Cast ==
- Robert Wagner as Alexander Mundy
- Malachi Throne as Noah Bain (Seasons 1 and 2)
- Edward Binns as Wally Powers (Season 3)

=== Recurring ===
- Susan Saint James as Charlie Brown
- Fred Astaire as Alistair Mundy (Season 3)
- Joseph Cotten as Mr. Jack (Season 3)
- George Murdock as Devon (Season 3)
- John Russell as William Dover (Season 3)
- Teri Garr as Maggie Philbin (Season 2 & 3)
- Sharon Acker as Dr. Edwina Hopkins (Seasons 1, 2 & 3)

== Home media ==
On November 15, 2011, Entertainment One released It Takes a Thief: The Complete Series on DVD in Region 1. The 18-disc set features all 66 episodes of the series, several bonus features, an interview with Robert Wagner, and a special feature-length cut of the pilot episode. The DVD set was promoted in commercials broadcast on Antenna TV, which featured Wagner publicizing the DVD set. Entertainment One would later release the complete first season as a standalone DVD set on October 2, 2012; this set also had the feature-length pilot episode.

In Region 2, March 2017 saw the complete series released under its German title Ihr Auftritt Al Mundy, with both German and English soundtracks included.

In Region 4, Madman Entertainment has released the entire series on DVD in Australia and New Zealand as three season box sets.

== Syndication ==
As of early May 2012, It Takes a Thief could be seen in syndication on the Antenna TV network.

== Unproduced film ==
In 2013, Universal Pictures announced they were developing a film version of the series with John Davis producing through Davis Entertainment, along with Joseph Singer. Derek Dauchy would supervise the project for Davis and Scott Bernstein for Universal. Greg Russo would write the script. There have been no developments since that time.
