= Bert Koomen =

Dutch footballer (born 1997)

Personal information
- Date of birth: 3 January 1997 (age 29)
- Place of birth: Sassenheim, Netherlands
- Height: 1.75 m (5 ft 9 in)
- Position: Right-back

Team information
- Current team: Rijnsburgse Boys
- Number: 21

Youth career
- Ter Leede
- 2006–2016: Feyenoord

Senior career*
Years	Team	Apps	(Gls)
2016–2017	Feyenoord	0	(0)
2017	→ Den Bosch (loan)	5	(0)
2017–2019	Lisse	58	(3)
2019–	Rijnsburgse Boys	91	(3)

International career
2012	Netherlands U15	2	(0)
2012	Netherlands U16	3	(0)
- * Club domestic league appearances and goals as of 06:53, 21 April 2024 (UTC)

Bert Koomen (born 3 January 1997) is a Dutch footballer who plays for Rijnsburgse Boys in the Tweede Divisie.

== Club career ==
He made his professional debut in the Eerste Divisie for FC Den Bosch on 3 March 2017 in a game against FC Emmen.
