= Olaf Wieghorst =

American painter

Olaf Wieghorst (April 30, 1899 – April 27, 1988) was a Danish-American painter who specialized in depictions of the American frontier. His art was in the vein of Frederic Remington and Charles Russell. In 1992, he was inducted into the Hall of Great Westerners of the National Cowboy & Western Heritage Museum.

Wieghorst has a museum dedicated to him that is located in downtown El Cajon, California.

== Early years ==
Olaf Carl Wieghorst was born in Viborg, Denmark. He worked on a farm where he often rode horses. He was a bare-back rider in the Schumann Circus and performed acrobatic feats for Tivoli Theater in Copenhagen. Wieghorst emigrated to the United States from Denmark in 1918 at the age of 19.

== Career ==
Wieghorst worked with the mounted patrol of the 5th Cavalry Regiment of the United States Cavalry (1920-1922) with occasional interludes as a wrangler on ranches in the western states. Wherever he went, he sketched and painted the Western culture he loved, often selling his work as calendar and magazine illustrations. His work appeared in Zane Grey's Western Magazine and Hoofs and Horns, an honor he shared with fellow cowboy artists including Daniel Cody Muller (1889–1976).

In 1924, Olaf Wieghorst married Brooklyn native Mabel Walters, In the same year, he joined the New York City Police Department (1924–1944) where he became a Mounted Police Officer with the Department. Due to his knowledge of horses, he was quickly sent to the Remount Section of the Mounted Unit where he broke and trained horses for the Unit. Wieghorst retired from the New York City Police Department in December, 1944, and once again headed west, with Mae and their son Roy. In 1945, Wieghorst settled in El Cajon, California, San Diego County, California, and spent the rest of his life there working on his art. He was a self-trained artist and learned to work with oil painting and water colors himself. Over time he became a proficient painter and as a result, Grand Central Art Galleries chose to display his paintings. He also painted horses and studied their nature. The most famous of his models were Gene Autry's Champion and Roy Rogers' Trigger.

He appeared in two John Wayne movies in the 60's; McLintock! (1963) and El Dorado (1966). Some of his art work was used in the open titles sequence in the film El Dorado (1966).

A retrospective of Wieghorst's work was presented at the National Cowboy and Western Heritage Museum (1974–75). In 1985 two of his works, The Navajo Madonna and The Navajo Man were sold for over $1 million. He died on April 28, 1988, in La Mesa, CA.

== Other sources ==
- Reed, William (1969). Olaf Wieghorst (Flagstaff, AZ: Northland Press) ISBN 0-87358-045-1
- Kelly, Tim (1962) The Southwest of Olaf Wieghorst (Arizona Highways, March, 1971)
