= Emy Koopman =

Dutch writer and journalist (born 1985)

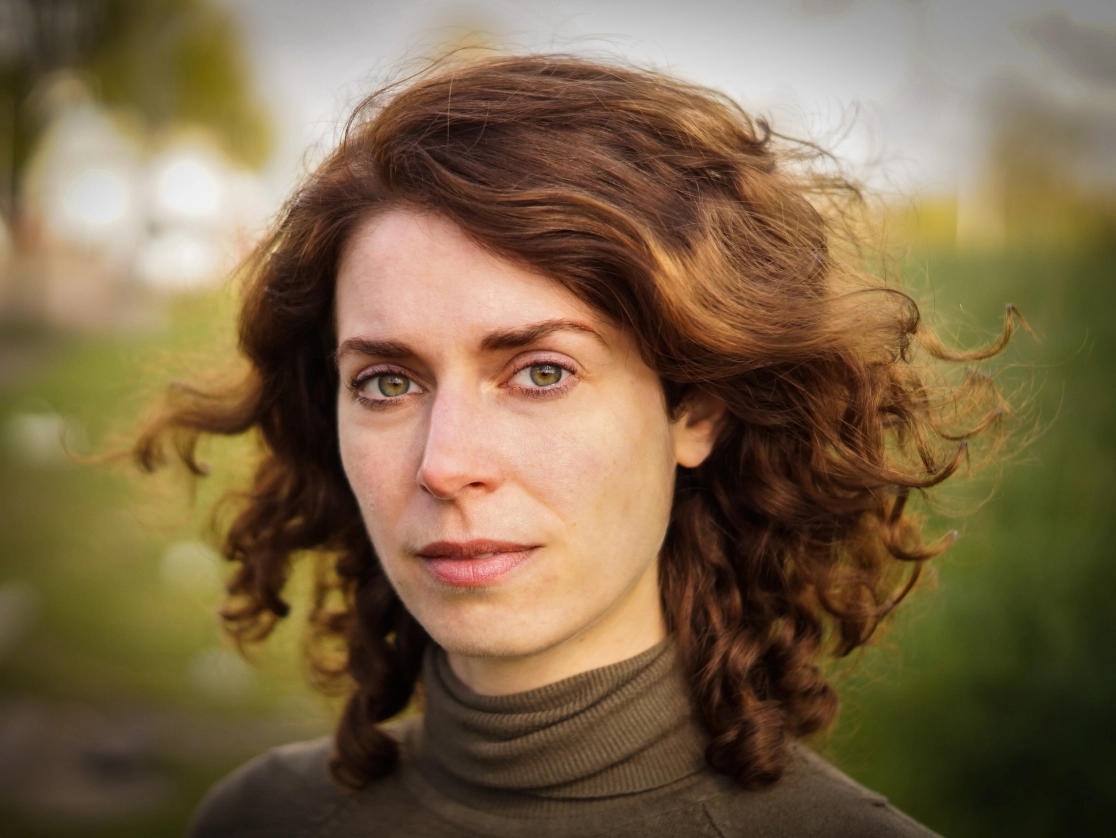
- Emy Koopman
- Education: Rotterdam University
- Occupations: writer, journalist, scholar
- Writing career
- Period: 2016–present
- Subjects: Literature, empathy
- Notable works: Orewoet, Het Boek van Alle Angsten, Tekenen van het Universum (German edition: "Leichter Wahnsinn", Weissbooks), Paradise Canada, De Vrouw in de Kelder, Reading Suffering
- Website: emykoopman.nl

Emy Koopman (born 1985) is a Dutch writer and journalist. She has written for De Groene Amsterdammer, de Volkskrant, de Correspondent and hard//hoofd.

Koopman studied literary studies (Research Master) and clinical psychology (Master). In 2016, she obtained a PhD at Erasmus University Rotterdam, with a dissertation on literature and empathy.

That same year, her debut novel Orewoet was published and nominated for The Bronze Owl for the best Dutch-language debut, and for the Fintro Literature Prize.

In August 2020, her second novel Het Boek van Alle Angsten (The Book of All Fears) was published.

Her third book, Tekenen van het Universum (Signs of the Universe) was released in February 2022 and was shortlisted for the De Boon Literatuurprijs 2023 as well as the Boekenpanda. The German edition of the book was published in 2026 by Weissbooks (translation by Ruth Löbner).

Her book Kindertrein uit Boedapest from 2023 was nominated for the BNG Bank Literatuurprijs.

In February 2025, her novel De Vrouw in de Kelder was published.

In 2020, Koopman presented Paradise Canada, a five-part Dutch-Canadian documentary and travel series by public broadcaster VPRO. Topics and locations included social impacts of Homelessness in Vancouver, the industry of Athabasca oil sands and Fort McMurray, violence against women in light of the Toronto van attack and the cultural, national tragedy, affected markedly on indigenous women, of the Highway of Tears in British Columbia.
