= Charlene Holt =

American actress (1928–1996)

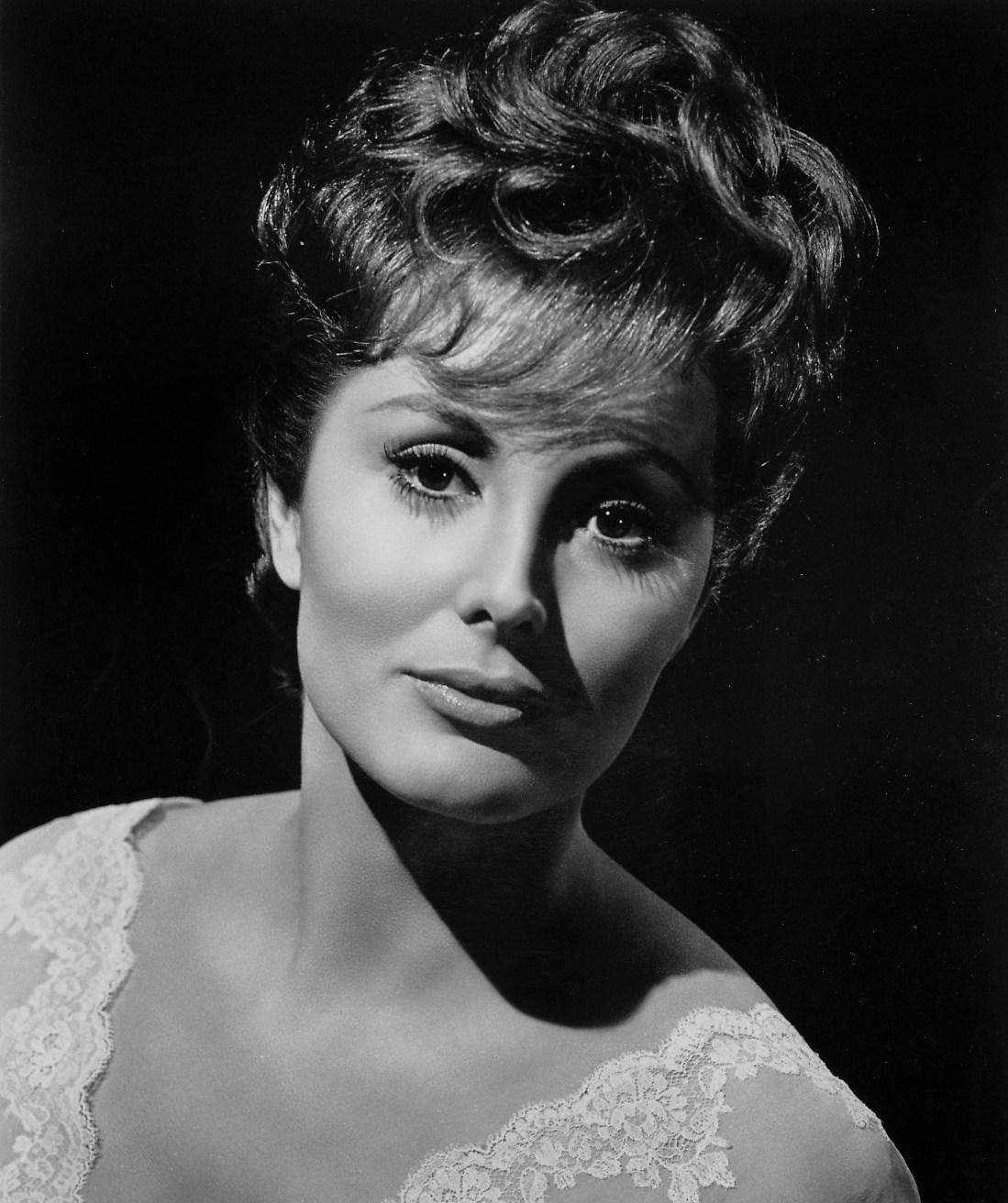
- Born: Verna Charlene Stavely; April 28, 1928; Snyder, Texas, U.S.
- Died: April 5, 1996 (aged 67); Williamson County, Tennessee, U.S.
- Occupations: Actress, model
- Years active: 1962–1980
- Spouse: William A. Tishman (m. 1966; div. 1972)

Verna Charlene Stavely, professionally known as Charlene Holt (April 28, 1928 – April 5, 1996), was an American actress known for her supporting roles in television and film.

== Early life ==
Holt was born on April 28, 1928, in Snyder, Texas, to Malcolm C. and Verna Vesta Stavely (née Chandler). After she graduated from high school in Hagerman, New Mexico, she attended McMurry University in Abilene, Texas. She was a model in Houston, Texas.

In 1956, Holt was crowned Miss Maryland.

Holt, who reportedly had signed a $50,000-a-year modeling contract in New York City when she was 19, appeared in various television commercials in 1958. She was in a Revlon lipstick commercial in which she was reportedly spotted by director Howard Hawks, who later cast her in several of his films, including Man's Favorite Sport? and El Dorado. She was subsequently named "Miss Sweater Girl" in October 1958 by the Wool Bureau. The contest was held in the Crystal Suite of the Savoy Hilton Hotel in New York City.

== Career ==
Holt's first credited role was as Lisa, a model, in If a Man Answers, a 1962 comedy film directed by Henry Levin and starring Bobby Darin and Sandra Dee. Subsequently until 1980, she played in many other movies and in TV series.

== Filmography ==
- Target: The Corruptors (1962, TV series)
- If a Man Answers (1962) – Lisa, model
- Hawaiian Eye (1962, TV series) – Evelyn Mason
- Saints and Sinners (1962, TV series) – Woman Correspondent
- Days of Wine and Roses (1962) – Guest (uncredited)
- Island of Love (1963; uncredited)
- The Alfred Hitchcock Hour (1963, TV series) (Season 2 Episode 2: "A Nice Touch") – Darlene Vance
- Burke's Law (1963–1964, TV series) – Cecily Channing / Christy
- Man's Favorite Sport? (1964) – Tex Connors
- Arrest and Trial (1964, TV series) – Fay Carlson
- Perry Mason (1965, TV series) – Helen Cadmus
- Red Line 7000 (1965) – Lindy
- Honey West (1965, TV series) – Gloria
- The Hero (1966, TV series) – Angie
- El Dorado (1966) – Maudie
- Hour of the Gun (1967) – Wife of Harry, the barber (uncredited)
- It Takes a Thief (1968, TV series) – Tracey Lewis / Miss Spencer
- Zigzag (1970) – Sara Raymond
- Wonder Woman (1974, TV movie) – Hippolyte
- Police Story (1975, TV series) – Maggie
- Melvin and Howard (1980) – Mrs. Worth
- CHiPs (1980, TV series) – Herself (uncredited; final appearance)

Awards and achievements
Preceded by Gloria Ruth King	Miss Maryland USA; 1956	Succeeded by Mary Leona Gage
