= 1958 in spaceflight (July–December) =

This article lists orbital and suborbital launches during the second half of the year 1958.

For all other spaceflight activities, see 1958 in spaceflight. For launches in the First half of 1958 see List of spaceflight launches in January–June 1958.

== Orbital launches ==
- ← Jan
- Feb
- Mar
- Apr
- May
- Jun
- Jul
- Aug
- Sep
- Oct
- Nov
- Dec →

Date and time (UTC)	Rocket	Flight number	Launch site		LSP	
Date and time (UTC)	Payload (⚀ = CubeSat)	Operator	Orbit	Function	Decay (UTC)	Outcome
Date and time (UTC)	Remarks					
=== July ===
25 July	(United States) NOTS-EV-1 Pilot II		(United States) F4D, Point Mugu		(United States) US Navy	
25 July	(United States) Pilot-1	US Navy	Intended: Medium Earth; Achieved: Unknown	Technology demonstration	25 July (presumed)	Launch failure
25 July	Maiden flight of NOTS-EV-1. Unexpected loss of signal during ascent. Unclear if spacecraft reached orbit, but no confirmed contact was made with it, and no objects from the launch were catalogued.					
26 July; 15:00:57	(United States) Juno I	RS/CC-44 (TT)	(United States) Cape Canaveral LC-5		(United States) ABMA	
26 July; 15:00:57	(United States) Explorer 4	ARPA	Initial: Medium Earth; Decayed to: Low Earth	Magnetospheric	23 October 1959	Successful
← Jan; Feb; Mar; Apr; May; Jun; Jul; Aug; Sep; Oct; Nov; Dec →; === August ===
12 August	(United States) NOTS-EV-1 Pilot II		(United States) F4D, Point Mugu		(United States) US Navy	
12 August	(United States) Pilot-2	US Navy	Intended: Medium Earth	Technology	+0 seconds	Launch failure
12 August	Exploded during first stage ignition.					
17 August; 12:18	(United States) Thor DM-18 Able-I		(United States) Cape Canaveral LC-17A		(United States) US Air Force	
17 August; 12:18	(United States) Pioneer 0 (Able I)	US Air Force	Intended: Selenocentric	Lunar probe	+77 seconds	Launch failure
17 August; 12:18	Maiden flight of Thor-Able I, exploded at an altitude of 16 kilometres (9.9 mi).					
22 August	(United States) NOTS-EV-1 Pilot II		(United States) F4D, Point Mugu		(United States) US Navy	
22 August	(United States) Pilot-3	US Navy	Intended: Medium Earth; Achieved: Unknown	Technology	22 August (presumed)	Launch failure
22 August	Unexpected loss of signal during ascent. Unclear if spacecraft reached orbit, but no confirmed contact was made with it, and no objects from the launch were catalogued.					
24 August; 06:17:22	(United States) Juno I	RS/CC-47 (HN)	(United States) Cape Canaveral LC-5		(United States) ABMA	
24 August; 06:17:22	(United States) Explorer 5	ARPA	Intended: Medium Earth	Magnetospheric	24 August	Launch failure
24 August; 06:17:22	Loss of control after recontact between first and second stages.					
25 August	(United States) NOTS-EV-1 Pilot II		(United States) F4D, Point Mugu		(United States) US Navy	
25 August	(United States) Pilot-4	US Navy	Intended: Medium Earth	Radiation	+0 seconds	Launch failure
25 August	Exploded during first stage ignition.					
26 August	(United States) NOTS-EV-1 Pilot II		(United States) F4D, Point Mugu		(United States) US Navy	
26 August	(United States) Pilot-5	US Navy	Intended: Medium Earth	Radiation	26 August	Launch failure
26 August	Failed to ignite.					
28 August	(United States) NOTS-EV-1 Pilot II		(United States) F4D, Point Mugu		(United States) US Navy	
28 August	(United States) Pilot-6	US Navy	Intended: Medium Earth	Radiation	28 August	Launch failure
28 August	One second stage engine failed to ignite, final flight of NOTS-EV-1.					
← Jan; Feb; Mar; Apr; May; Jun; Jul; Aug; Sep; Oct; Nov; Dec →; === September ===
23 September; 07:40:23	(Soviet Union) Luna	B1-3	(Soviet Union) Baikonur Site 1/5		(Soviet Union) MVS	
23 September; 07:40:23	(Soviet Union) Luna E-1 №1 (Ye-1 №1)	MVS	Planned: Heliocentric	Lunar probe	+92 seconds	Launch failure
23 September; 07:40:23	Maiden flight of Luna (also known as Vostok-L). First Soviet Lunar Mission attempt. Failed at T+92 seconds for same reason as Sputnik 3 (vibrations in strap-ons).					
26 September; 15:38	(United States) Vanguard	SLV-3	(United States) Cape Canaveral LC-18A		(United States) US Navy	
26 September; 15:38	(United States) Vanguard (Cloud Cover Satellite 1)	NRL	Intended: Medium Earth	Atmospheric	26 September	Launch failure
26 September; 15:38	Second stage underperformed.					
← Jan; Feb; Mar; Apr; May; Jun; Jul; Aug; Sep; Oct; Nov; Dec →; === October ===
11 October; 08:42:13	(United States) Thor DM-18 Able-I		(United States) Cape Canaveral LC-17A		(United States) NASA	
11 October; 08:42:13	(United States) Pioneer 1 (Able II)	NASA	Intended: Selenocentric	Lunar probe	13 October; 03:46	Launch failure
11 October; 08:42:13	Third stage underperformed and Pioneer-1, failed to reach the Moon. However, the spacecraft was still able to transmit data on radiation between the Earth and Moon. It was the first NASA launch.					
11 October	(Soviet Union) Luna	B1-4	(Soviet Union) Baikonur Site 1/5		(Soviet Union) MVS	
11 October	(Soviet Union) Luna E-1 №2 (Ye-1 №2)	MVS	Intended: Heliocentric	Lunar probe	+104 seconds	Launch failure
11 October	Broke up on ascent from longitudinal vibrations again, this time at T+104 seconds.					
23 October; 03:21:04	(United States) Juno I	RS/CC-49 (HE)	(United States) Cape Canaveral LC-5		(United States) ABMA	
23 October; 03:21:04	(United States) Beacon 1	US Army	Intended: Low Earth	Atmospheric	+149 seconds	Launch failure
23 October; 03:21:04	Structural failure, final flight of Juno I.					
← Jan; Feb; Mar; Apr; May; Jun; Jul; Aug; Sep; Oct; Nov; Dec →; === November ===
8 November; 07:30:21	(United States) Thor DM-18 Able-I		(United States) Cape Canaveral LC-17A		(United States) NASA	
8 November; 07:30:21	(United States) Pioneer 2 (Able III)	NASA	Intended: Selenocentric	Lunar probe	8 November	Launch failure
8 November; 07:30:21	Third stage failed to ignite.					
← Jan; Feb; Mar; Apr; May; Jun; Jul; Aug; Sep; Oct; Nov; Dec →; === December ===
4 December	(Soviet Union) Luna	B1-5	(Soviet Union) Baikonur Site 1/5		(Soviet Union) MVS	
4 December	(Soviet Union) Luna E-1 №3 (Ye-1 №3)	MVS	Intended: Heliocentric	Lunar probe	+245 seconds	Launch failure
4 December	T+245 seconds into flight a hydrogen peroxide pump seized up due to loss of lubrication, which caused the rocket's core stage engines to fail.					
6 December; 05:44:52	(United States) Juno II	AM-11	(United States) Cape Canaveral LC-5		(United States) ABMA	
6 December; 05:44:52	(United States) Pioneer 3	NASA	Intended: Heliocentric	Lunar flyby	7 December; 19:51	Launch failure
6 December; 05:44:52	Maiden flight of Juno II, premature first stage cutoff and erroneous angle during orbital insertion resulted in failure to reach orbit. Catalogued despite being on a suborbital trajectory. Returned data on radiation between the Earth and Moon.					
18 December; 23:02	(United States) Atlas B		(United States) Cape Canaveral LC-11		(United States) US Air Force	
18 December; 23:02	(United States) SCORE	ARPA	Low Earth	Communication	12 January 1959	Successful
18 December; 23:02	First communications satellite, only orbital launch of Atlas B.					
← Jan; Feb; Mar; Apr; May; Jun; Jul; Aug; Sep; Oct; Nov; Dec →

== Suborbital flights ==
Date and time (UTC)	Rocket	Flight number	Launch site		LSP	
Date and time (UTC)	Payload (⚀ = CubeSat)	Operator	Orbit	Function	Decay (UTC)	Outcome
Date and time (UTC)	Remarks					
2 July; 05:00	(East Germany) (Soviet Union) R-2A		(Soviet Union) Kapustin Yar		(Soviet Union) AN	
2 July; 05:00		AN	Suborbital		2 July	Successful
2 July; 05:00	Apogee: 210 kilometres (130 mi)					
2 July	(United States) X-17		(United States) USS Norton Sound, San Clemente		(United States) US Navy	
2 July	(United States) Winder 1	US Navy	Suborbital	Missile test	2 July	Successful
2 July	Apogee: 560 kilometres (350 mi), delivery test ahead of Operation Argus					
3 July; 18:52	(United States) Aerobee		(Canada) Churchill		(United States) US Air Force	
3 July; 18:52		US Air Force	Suborbital	Ionospheric	3 July	Successful
3 July; 18:52	Apogee: 262 kilometres (163 mi)					
6 July; 12:02	(United States) Aerobee		(Canada) Churchill		(United States) US Air Force	
6 July; 12:02		US Air Force	Suborbital	Ionospheric	6 July	Successful
6 July; 12:02	Apogee: 250 kilometres (160 mi)					
7 July; 18:50	(United States) Nike-Cajun		(Canada) Churchill		(United States) US Air Force	
7 July; 18:50		US Air Force	Suborbital	Aeronomy; Imaging	7 July	Successful
7 July; 18:50	Apogee: 121 kilometres (75 mi)					
7 July; 23:18	(United States) Nike-Asp		(United States) Point Mugu		(United States) US Navy	
7 July; 23:18		US Navy	Suborbital		7 July	Successful
7 July; 23:18	Apogee: 200 kilometres (120 mi)					
8 July; 23:15	(United States) Nike-Asp		(United States) Point Mugu		(United States) US Navy	
8 July; 23:15		US Navy	Suborbital		8 July	Successful
8 July; 23:15	Apogee: 225 kilometres (140 mi)					
10 July; 02:30	(United States) Thor DM-18 Able		(United States) Cape Canaveral LC-17A		(United States) US Air Force	
10 July; 02:30		US Air Force	Suborbital	REV test	10 July	Successful
10 July; 02:30	Apogee: 1,600 kilometres (990 mi), REV carried Mia II, a mouse					
10 July; 07:42	(Soviet Union) R-7 Semyorka		(Soviet Union) Baikonur Site 1/5		(Soviet Union) MVS	
10 July; 07:42		MVS	Suborbital	Missile test	10 July	Launch failure
11 July; 18:30	(United States) Aerobee		(Canada) Churchill		(United States) US Air Force	
11 July; 18:30		US Air Force	Suborbital	Ionospheric	11 July	Successful
11 July; 18:30	Apogee: 243 kilometres (151 mi)					
11 July	(United States) Jason (Argo-E5)		(United States) Wallops Island		(United States) US Air Force	
11 July		US Air Force	Suborbital	Test flight	11 July	Launch failure
11 July	Apogee: 20 kilometres (12 mi), maiden flight of Jason					
12 July; 20:30	(United States) Nike-Cajun		(Canada) Churchill		(United States) US Air Force	
12 July; 20:30		US Air Force	Suborbital	Aeronomy; Imaging	12 July	Successful
12 July; 20:30	Apogee: 114 kilometres (71 mi)					
13 July; 06:36	(United States) PGM-17 Thor DM-18		(United States) Cape Canaveral LC-17B		(United States) US Air Force	
13 July; 06:36		US Air Force	Suborbital	Missile test	13 July	Successful
13 July; 06:36	Apogee: 520 kilometres (320 mi)					
15 July; 20:07	(United States) Nike-Cajun		(Canada) Churchill		(United States) US Air Force	
15 July; 20:07		US Air Force	Suborbital	Aeronomy	15 July	Successful
15 July; 20:07	Apogee: 126 kilometres (78 mi)					
16 July; 22:40	(United States) Nike-Cajun		(Canada) Churchill		(United States) US Air Force	
16 July; 22:40		US Air Force	Suborbital		16 July	Successful
16 July; 22:40	Apogee: 142 kilometres (88 mi)					
16 July	(United States) Arcon		(United States) Wallops Island		(United States) US Navy	
16 July		NRL	Suborbital	Test flight	16 July	Launch failure
16 July	Apogee: 1 kilometre (0.62 mi)					
17 July; 07:21	(United States) Nike-Cajun		(Canada) Churchill		(United States) US Air Force	
17 July; 07:21		US Air Force	Suborbital	Aeronomy	17 July	Successful
17 July; 07:21	Apogee: 169 kilometres (105 mi)					
17 July; 09:04	(United States) PGM-19 Jupiter		(United States) Cape Canaveral LC-26B		(United States) ABMA	
17 July; 09:04		US Air Force	Suborbital	REV test	17 July	Successful
17 July; 09:04	Apogee: 500 kilometres (310 mi), carried a Gaslight re-entry vehicle which was recovered					
17 July; 17:48	(United States) Nike-Asp		(United States) Point Mugu		(United States) US Navy	
17 July; 17:48		US Navy	Suborbital		17 July	Successful
17 July; 17:48	Apogee: 225 kilometres (140 mi)					
17 July	(United States) Jason (Argo-E5)		(United States) Wallops Island		(United States) US Air Force	
17 July		US Air Force	Suborbital	Test flight	17 July	Launch failure
17 July	Apogee: 20 kilometres (12 mi)					
18 July	(United States) WS-199B Bold Orion I		(United States) B-47, Cape Canaveral		(United States) US Air Force	
18 July		US Air Force	Suborbital	Missile test	18 July	Successful
18 July	Apogee: 100 kilometres (62 mi)					
19 July; 17:36	(United States) SM-65B Atlas		(United States) Cape Canaveral LC-11		(United States) US Air Force	
19 July; 17:36		US Air Force	Suborbital	Missile test	19 July	Launch failure
19 July; 17:36	Apogee: 10 kilometres (6.2 mi), maiden flight of Atlas B					
21 July	(United States) Arcon		(United States) Wallops Island		(United States) US Army	
21 July		SRDL	Suborbital	Test flight	21 July	Launch failure
21 July	Apogee: 1 kilometre (0.62 mi)					
22 July	(United States) Arcon		(United States) Wallops Island		(United States) US Navy	
22 July		NRL	Suborbital	Test flight	22 July	Launch failure
22 July	Apogee: 20 kilometres (12 mi)					
23 July; 22:13	(United States) Thor DM-18 Able		(United States) Cape Canaveral LC-17A		(United States) US Air Force	
23 July; 22:13		US Air Force	Suborbital	REV test	23 July	Successful
23 July; 22:13	Apogee: 1,600 kilometres (990 mi), REV carried Wickie, a mouse					
24 July	(United States) X-17		(United States) USS Norton Sound, San Clemente		(United States) US Navy	
24 July	(United States) Winder 4	US Navy	Suborbital	Missile test	24 July	Successful
24 July	Apogee: 560 kilometres (350 mi), delivery test ahead of Operation Argus					
25 July; 05:01	(United States) Nike-Asp		(United States) Point Mugu		(United States) US Navy	
25 July; 05:01		US Navy	Suborbital		25 July	Successful
25 July; 05:01	Apogee: 200 kilometres (120 mi)					
26 July; 06:40	(United States) PGM-17 Thor DM-18		(United States) Cape Canaveral LC-17B		(United States) US Air Force	
26 July; 06:40		US Air Force	Suborbital	Missile test	26 July	Successful
29 July; 05:03	(United States) Nike-Asp		(United States) Point Mugu		(United States) US Navy	
29 July; 05:03		US Navy	Suborbital		29 July	Successful
29 July; 05:03	Apogee: 200 kilometres (120 mi)					
31 July	(East Germany) (Soviet Union) R-2A		(Soviet Union) Kapustin Yar SP-2		(Soviet Union) OKB-1	
31 July		OKB-1	Suborbital	Target	31 July	Successful
31 July	Apogee: 100 kilometres (62 mi)					
July	(United States) X-17		(United States) USS Norton Sound, San Clemente		(United States) US Navy	
July	(United States) Winder 2	US Navy	Suborbital	Missile test		Launch failure
July	Apogee: 10 kilometres (6.2 mi), delivery test ahead of Operation Argus					
July	(United States) X-17		(United States) USS Norton Sound, San Clemente		(United States) US Navy	
July	(United States) Winder 3	US Navy	Suborbital	Missile test		Launch failure
July	Delivery test ahead of Operation Argus					
1 August	(United States) Jason (Argo-E5)		(United States) Wallops Island		(United States) US Air Force	
1 August		US Air Force	Suborbital	Test flight	1 August	Successful
1 August	Apogee: 750 kilometres (470 mi)					
1 August	(United States) ASCAMP		(United States) Johnston		(United States) US Navy	
1 August		NRDL	Suborbital		1 August	Successful
1 August	Apogee: 100 kilometres (62 mi), observed Hardtack Teak nuclear explosion or its effects					
1 August	(United States) ASCAMP		(United States) Johnston		(United States) US Navy	
1 August		NRDL	Suborbital		1 August	Successful
1 August	Apogee: 100 kilometres (62 mi), observed Hardtack Teak nuclear explosion or its effects					
1 August	(United States) ASCAMP		(United States) Johnston		(United States) US Navy	
1 August		NRDL	Suborbital		1 August	Successful
1 August	Apogee: 100 kilometres (62 mi), observed Hardtack Teak nuclear explosion or its effects					
1 August	(United States) ASCAMP		(United States) Johnston		(United States) US Navy	
1 August		NRDL	Suborbital		1 August	Successful
1 August	Apogee: 100 kilometres (62 mi), observed Hardtack Teak nuclear explosion or its effects					
1 August	(United States) ASCAMP		(United States) Johnston		(United States) US Navy	
1 August		NRDL	Suborbital		1 August	Successful
1 August	Apogee: 100 kilometres (62 mi), observed Hardtack Teak nuclear explosion or its effects					
1 August	(United States) ASCAMP		(United States) Johnston		(United States) US Navy	
1 August		NRDL	Suborbital		1 August	Successful
1 August	Apogee: 100 kilometres (62 mi), observed Hardtack Teak nuclear explosion or its effects					
1 August	(United States) ASCAMP		(United States) Johnston		(United States) US Navy	
1 August		NRDL	Suborbital		1 August	Successful
1 August	Apogee: 100 kilometres (62 mi), observed Hardtack Teak nuclear explosion or its effects					
1 August	(United States) ASCAMP		(United States) Johnston		(United States) US Navy	
1 August		NRDL	Suborbital		1 August	Successful
1 August	Apogee: 100 kilometres (62 mi), observed Hardtack Teak nuclear explosion or its effects					
1 August	(United States) ASCAMP		(United States) Johnston		(United States) US Navy	
1 August		NRDL	Suborbital		1 August	Successful
1 August	Apogee: 100 kilometres (62 mi), observed Hardtack Teak nuclear explosion or its effects					
1 August	(United States) ASCAMP		(United States) Johnston		(United States) US Navy	
1 August		NRDL	Suborbital		1 August	Successful
1 August	Apogee: 100 kilometres (62 mi), observed Hardtack Teak nuclear explosion or its effects					
1 August	(United States) ASCAMP		(United States) Johnston		(United States) US Navy	
1 August		NRDL	Suborbital		1 August	Successful
1 August	Apogee: 100 kilometres (62 mi), observed Hardtack Teak nuclear explosion or its effects					
1 August	(United States) ASCAMP		(United States) Johnston		(United States) US Navy	
1 August		NRDL	Suborbital		1 August	Successful
1 August	Apogee: 100 kilometres (62 mi), observed Hardtack Teak nuclear explosion or its effects					
1 August	(United States) ASCAMP		(United States) Johnston		(United States) US Navy	
1 August		NRDL	Suborbital		1 August	Successful
1 August	Apogee: 100 kilometres (62 mi), observed Hardtack Teak nuclear explosion or its effects					
2 August; 05:47	(East Germany) (Soviet Union) R-2A		(Soviet Union) Kapustin Yar		(Soviet Union) MVS	
2 August; 05:47		MVS	Suborbital		2 August	Successful
2 August; 05:47	Apogee: 211 kilometres (131 mi)					
2 August; 22:16	(United States) SM-65B Atlas		(United States) Cape Canaveral LC-13		(United States) US Air Force	
2 August; 22:16		US Air Force	Suborbital	Missile test	2 August	Successful
2 August; 22:16	Apogee: 900 kilometres (560 mi)					
6 August	(United States) PGM-17 Thor DM-18		(United States) Cape Canaveral LC-18B		(United States) US Air Force	
6 August		US Air Force	Suborbital	Missile test	6 August	Successful
6 August	Apogee: 520 kilometres (320 mi)					
7 August	(East Germany) (Soviet Union) R-2A		(Soviet Union) Kapustin Yar SP-2		(Soviet Union) OKB-1	
7 August		OKB-1	Suborbital	Target	7 August	Successful
7 August	Apogee: 100 kilometres (62 mi)					
12 August	(United States) ASCAMP		(United States) Johnston		(United States) US Navy	
12 August		NRDL	Suborbital		12 August	Successful
12 August	Apogee: 100 kilometres (62 mi), observed Hardtack Orange nuclear explosion or its effects					
12 August	(United States) ASCAMP		(United States) Johnston		(United States) US Navy	
12 August		NRDL	Suborbital		12 August	Successful
12 August	Apogee: 100 kilometres (62 mi), observed Hardtack Orange nuclear explosion or its effects					
12 August	(United States) ASCAMP		(United States) Johnston		(United States) US Navy	
12 August		NRDL	Suborbital		12 August	Successful
12 August	Apogee: 100 kilometres (62 mi), observed Hardtack Orange nuclear explosion or its effects					
12 August	(United States) ASCAMP		(United States) Johnston		(United States) US Navy	
12 August		NRDL	Suborbital		12 August	Successful
12 August	Apogee: 100 kilometres (62 mi), observed Hardtack Orange nuclear explosion or its effects					
12 August	(United States) ASCAMP		(United States) Johnston		(United States) US Navy	
12 August		NRDL	Suborbital		12 August	Successful
12 August	Apogee: 100 kilometres (62 mi), observed Hardtack Orange nuclear explosion or its effects					
12 August	(United States) ASCAMP		(United States) Johnston		(United States) US Navy	
12 August		NRDL	Suborbital		12 August	Successful
12 August	Apogee: 100 kilometres (62 mi), observed Hardtack Orange nuclear explosion or its effects					
12 August	(United States) ASCAMP		(United States) Johnston		(United States) US Navy	
12 August		NRDL	Suborbital		12 August	Successful
12 August	Apogee: 100 kilometres (62 mi), observed Hardtack Orange nuclear explosion or its effects					
12 August	(United States) ASCAMP		(United States) Johnston		(United States) US Navy	
12 August		NRDL	Suborbital		12 August	Successful
12 August	Apogee: 100 kilometres (62 mi), observed Hardtack Orange nuclear explosion or its effects					
12 August	(United States) ASCAMP		(United States) Johnston		(United States) US Navy	
12 August		NRDL	Suborbital		12 August	Successful
12 August	Apogee: 100 kilometres (62 mi), observed Hardtack Orange nuclear explosion or its effects					
12 August	(United States) ASCAMP		(United States) Johnston		(United States) US Navy	
12 August		NRDL	Suborbital		12 August	Successful
12 August	Apogee: 100 kilometres (62 mi), observed Hardtack Orange nuclear explosion or its effects					
12 August	(United States) ASCAMP		(United States) Johnston		(United States) US Navy	
12 August		NRDL	Suborbital		12 August	Successful
12 August	Apogee: 100 kilometres (62 mi), observed Hardtack Orange nuclear explosion or its effects					
12 August	(United States) ASCAMP		(United States) Johnston		(United States) US Navy	
12 August		NRDL	Suborbital		12 August	Successful
12 August	Apogee: 100 kilometres (62 mi), observed Hardtack Orange nuclear explosion or its effects					
12 August	(United States) ASCAMP		(United States) Johnston		(United States) US Navy	
12 August		NRDL	Suborbital		12 August	Successful
12 August	Apogee: 100 kilometres (62 mi), observed Hardtack Orange nuclear explosion or its effects					
12 August	(United States) ASCAMP		(United States) Johnston		(United States) US Navy	
12 August		NRDL	Suborbital		12 August	Launch failure
12 August	Apogee: 100 kilometres (62 mi), intended to observe Hardtack Orange nuclear explosion or its effects					
13 August; 02:00	(East Germany) (Soviet Union) R-2A		(Soviet Union) Kapustin Yar		(Soviet Union) AN	
13 August; 02:00		AN	Suborbital		13 August	Successful
13 August; 02:00	Apogee: 212 kilometres (132 mi)					
13 August	(United States) Aerobee		(United States) Holloman LC-A		(United States) US Air Force	
13 August		US Air Force	Suborbital	Ionospheric	13 August	Successful
13 August	Apogee: 100 kilometres (62 mi)					
14 August; 00:40	(East Germany) (Soviet Union) A-1		(Soviet Union) Ernst Krenkel Observatory		(Soviet Union) MVS	
14 August; 00:40		MVS	Suborbital	Ionospheric; Aeronomy	14 August	Successful
14 August; 00:40	Apogee: 100 kilometres (62 mi)					
14 August; 13:28	(United States) Nike-Cajun		(United States) White Sands		(United States) US Air Force	
14 August; 13:28		US Air Force	Suborbital		14 August	Successful
14 August; 13:28	Apogee: 132 kilometres (82 mi)					
15 August; 04:16	(United States) Jason (Argo-E5)		(United States) Cape Canaveral LC-10		(United States) US Air Force	
15 August; 04:16		US Air Force	Suborbital	Radiation	15 August	Successful
15 August; 04:16	Apogee: 693 kilometres (431 mi), part of Operation Argus					
15 August; 15:45	(United States) Aerobee		(United States) Holloman LC-A		(United States) US Air Force	
15 August; 15:45		US Air Force	Suborbital	Ionospheric	15 August	Successful
15 August; 15:45	Apogee: 200 kilometres (120 mi)					
17 August	(East Germany) (Soviet Union) R-2A		(Soviet Union) Kapustin Yar SP-2		(Soviet Union) OKB-1	
17 August		OKB-1	Suborbital	Target	17 August	Successful
17 August	Apogee: 100 kilometres (62 mi)					
20 August; 11:27	(United States) Jason (Argo-E5)		(United States) Ramey		(United States) US Air Force	
20 August; 11:27		US Air Force	Suborbital	Radiation	20 August	Successful
20 August; 11:27	Apogee: 800 kilometres (500 mi), part of Operation Argus					
25 August; 18:17	(United States) Jason (Argo-E5)		(United States) Wallops Island		(United States) US Air Force	
25 August; 18:17		US Air Force	Suborbital	Radiation	25 August	Successful
25 August; 18:17	Apogee: 800 kilometres (500 mi), part of Operation Argus					
27 August; 02:20	(United States) X-17		(United States) USS Norton Sound, AO-7		(United States) US Navy	
27 August; 02:20	(United States) Argus I	US Navy	Suborbital	Nuclear test	02:28	Successful
27 August; 02:20	Apogee: 160 kilometres (99 mi)					
27 August; 03:33	(United States) Jason (Argo-E5)		(United States) Cape Canaveral LC-10		(United States) US Air Force	
27 August; 03:33		US Air Force	Suborbital	Radiation	27 August	Successful
27 August; 03:33	Apogee: 937 kilometres (582 mi), part of Operation Argus, observed Argus I test or its effects					
27 August; 04:06	(East Germany) (Soviet Union) R-2A		(Soviet Union) Kapustin Yar		(Soviet Union) MVS	
27 August; 04:06		MVS	Suborbital		27 August	Successful
27 August; 04:06	Apogee: 209 kilometres (130 mi)					
27 August; 04:24	(United States) Jason (Argo-E5)		(United States) Ramey		(United States) US Air Force	
27 August; 04:24		US Air Force	Suborbital	Radiation	27 August	Successful
27 August; 04:24	Apogee: 800 kilometres (500 mi), part of Operation Argus, observed Argus I test or its effects					
27 August; 06:05	(Soviet Union) R-5A Pobeda		(Soviet Union) Kapustin Yar		(Soviet Union) AN	
27 August; 06:05		AN	Suborbital		27 August	Successful
27 August; 06:05	Apogee: 450 kilometres (280 mi)					
27 August; 06:42	(United States) Jason (Argo-E5)		(United States) Ramey		(United States) US Air Force	
27 August; 06:42		US Air Force	Suborbital	Radiation	27 August	Successful
27 August; 06:42	Apogee: 817 kilometres (508 mi), part of Operation Argus, observed Argus I test or its effects					
27 August; 07:29	(United States) Jason (Argo-E5)		(United States) Wallops Island		(United States) US Air Force	
27 August; 07:29		US Air Force	Suborbital	Radiation	27 August	Successful
27 August; 07:29	Apogee: 800 kilometres (500 mi), part of Operation Argus, observed Argus I test or its effects					
27 August; 12:40	(Soviet Union) R-5A Pobeda		(Soviet Union) Kapustin Yar		(Soviet Union) AN	
27 August; 12:40		AN	Suborbital		27 August	Successful
27 August; 12:40	Apogee: 450 kilometres (280 mi)					
27 August; 23:15	(United States) PGM-19 Jupiter		(United States) Cape Canaveral LC-26A		(United States) ABMA	
27 August; 23:15		US Air Force	Suborbital	REV test	27 August	Successful
27 August; 23:15	Apogee: 500 kilometres (310 mi)					
27 August	(East Germany) (Soviet Union) R-2A		(Soviet Union) Kapustin Yar SP-2		(Soviet Union) OKB-1	
27 August		OKB-1	Suborbital	Target	27 August	Successful
27 August	Apogee: 100 kilometres (62 mi)					
29 August; 04:30	(United States) SM-65B Atlas		(United States) Cape Canaveral LC-11		(United States) US Air Force	
29 August; 04:30		US Air Force	Suborbital	Missile test	29 August	Successful
29 August; 04:30	Apogee: 900 kilometres (560 mi)					
30 August; 03:10	(United States) X-17		(United States) USS Norton Sound, AO-8		(United States) US Navy	
30 August; 03:10	(United States) Argus II	US Navy	Suborbital	Nuclear test	03:18	Successful
30 August; 03:10	Apogee: 293 kilometres (182 mi)					
30 August; 03:48	(United States) Jason (Argo-E5)		(United States) Wallops Island		(United States) US Air Force	
30 August; 03:48		US Air Force	Suborbital	Radiation	30 August	Successful
30 August; 03:48	Apogee: 817 kilometres (508 mi), part of Operation Argus, observed Argus II test or its effects					
30 August; 04:31	(United States) Jason (Argo-E5)		(United States) Cape Canaveral LC-10		(United States) US Air Force	
30 August; 04:31		US Air Force	Suborbital	Radiation	30 August	Successful
30 August; 04:31	Apogee: 878 kilometres (546 mi), part of Operation Argus, observed Argus II test or its effects					
30 August; 05:18	(United States) Jason (Argo-E5)		(United States) Wallops Island		(United States) US Air Force	
30 August; 05:18		US Air Force	Suborbital	Radiation	30 August	Successful
30 August; 05:18	Apogee: 830 kilometres (520 mi), part of Operation Argus, observed Argus II test or its effects					
30 August; 05:52	(United States) Jason (Argo-E5)		(United States) Ramey		(United States) US Air Force	
30 August; 05:52		US Air Force	Suborbital	Radiation	30 August	Successful
30 August; 05:52	Apogee: 825 kilometres (513 mi), part of Operation Argus, observed Argus II test or its effects					
30 August; 06:36	(United States) Jason (Argo-E5)		(United States) Cape Canaveral LC-10		(United States) US Air Force	
30 August; 06:36		US Air Force	Suborbital	Radiation	30 August	Successful
30 August; 06:36	Apogee: 699 kilometres (434 mi), part of Operation Argus, observed Argus II test or its effects					
30 August; 07:21	(United States) Jason (Argo-E5)		(United States) Wallops Island		(United States) US Air Force	
30 August; 07:21		US Air Force	Suborbital	Radiation	30 August	Successful
30 August; 07:21	Apogee: 815 kilometres (506 mi), part of Operation Argus, observed Argus II test or its effects					
30 August; 22:02	(United States) Jason (Argo-E5)		(United States) Wallops Island		(United States) US Air Force	
30 August; 22:02		US Air Force	Suborbital	Radiation	30 August	Successful
30 August; 22:02	Apogee: 745 kilometres (463 mi), part of Operation Argus, observed Argus II test or its effects					
30 August; 23:03	(United States) Jason (Argo-E5)		(United States) Ramey		(United States) US Air Force	
30 August; 23:03		US Air Force	Suborbital	Radiation	30 August	Successful
30 August; 23:03	Apogee: 800 kilometres (500 mi), part of Operation Argus, observed Argus II test or its effects					
31 August; 00:07	(United States) Jason (Argo-E5)		(United States) Cape Canaveral LC-10		(United States) US Air Force	
31 August; 00:07		US Air Force	Suborbital	Radiation	31 August	Successful
31 August; 00:07	Apogee: 800 kilometres (500 mi), part of Operation Argus, observed Argus II test or its effects					
August	(Soviet Union) R-12 Dvina		(Soviet Union) Kapustin Yar		(Soviet Union) MVS	
August		MVS	Suborbital	Missile test		Successful
August	Apogee: 402 kilometres (250 mi)					
August	(Soviet Union) R-12 Dvina		(Soviet Union) Kapustin Yar		(Soviet Union) MVS	
August		MVS	Suborbital	Missile test		Successful
August	Apogee: 402 kilometres (250 mi)					
2 September; 19:03	(United States) Jason (Argo-E5)		(United States) Ramey		(United States) US Air Force	
2 September; 19:03		US Air Force	Suborbital	Radiation	2 September	Successful
2 September; 19:03	Apogee: 800 kilometres (500 mi), part of Operation Argus					
2 September; 20:03	(United States) Jason (Argo-E5)		(United States) Wallops Island		(United States) US Air Force	
2 September; 20:03		US Air Force	Suborbital	Radiation	2 September	Successful
2 September; 20:03	Apogee: 7,897 kilometres (4,907 mi), part of Operation Argus					
2 September; 22:15	(United States) Jason (Argo-E5)		(United States) Cape Canaveral LC-10		(United States) US Air Force	
2 September; 22:15		US Air Force	Suborbital	Radiation	2 September	Successful
2 September; 22:15	Apogee: 89 kilometres (55 mi), part of Operation Argus					
6 September; 22:05	(United States) X-17		(United States) USS Norton Sound, AO-9		(United States) US Navy	
6 September; 22:05	(United States) Argus III	US Navy	Suborbital	Nuclear test	22:13	Successful
6 September; 22:05	Apogee: 750 kilometres (470 mi), final flight of X-17					
6 September	(Soviet Union) R-11FM Zemlya		(Soviet Union) B-62, Beloye More		(Soviet Union) OKB-1	
6 September		OKB-1	Suborbital	Missile test	6 September	Successful
6 September	Apogee: 200 kilometres (120 mi)					
7 September; 10:33	(United Kingdom) Black Knight		(Australia) Woomera LA-5A		(United Kingdom) RAE	
7 September; 10:33		RAE	Suborbital	Test flight	7 September	Successful
7 September; 10:33	Apogee: 255 kilometres (158 mi), maiden flight of Black Knight					
11 September	(United States) Nike-Cajun		(United States) Wallops Island		(United States) ARPA	
11 September	(United States) Beacon Test 3	ARPA	Suborbital	Technology	11 September	Successful
11 September	Apogee: 122 kilometres (76 mi)					
14 September; 05:24	(United States) SM-65B Atlas		(United States) Cape Canaveral LC-14		(United States) US Air Force	
14 September; 05:24		US Air Force	Suborbital	Missile test	14 September	Successful
14 September; 05:24	Apogee: 900 kilometres (560 mi)					
18 September; 21:27	(United States) SM-65B Atlas		(United States) Cape Canaveral LC-13		(United States) US Air Force	
18 September; 21:27		US Air Force	Suborbital	Missile test	18 September	Launch failure
18 September; 21:27	Apogee: 100 kilometres (62 mi)					
19 September; 00:48	(Soviet Union) R-5A Pobeda		(Soviet Union) Kapustin Yar		(Soviet Union) AN	
19 September; 00:48		AN	Suborbital		19 September	Successful
19 September; 00:48	Apogee: 430 kilometres (270 mi)					
24 September; 17:15	(United States) UGM-27 Polaris AX		(United States) Cape Canaveral LC-25A		(United States) US Navy	
24 September; 17:15		US Navy	Suborbital	Missile test	24 September	Launch failure
24 September; 17:15	Apogee: 12 kilometres (7.5 mi)					
25 September	(United States) WS-199B Bold Orion I		(United States) B-47, Cape Canaveral		(United States) US Air Force	
25 September		US Air Force	Suborbital	Missile test	25 September	Successful
25 September	Apogee: 100 kilometres (62 mi)					
25 September	(United States) Exos		(United States) Wallops Island		(United States) NACA/AFCRL	
25 September		NACA/AFCRL	Suborbital	Test flight	25 September	Successful
25 September	Apogee: 460 kilometres (290 mi), maiden flight of Exos					
28 September; 19:42	(United States) Nike-Asp		(United States) USS Point Defiance, PO-13		(United States) US Navy	
28 September; 19:42		US Navy	Suborbital	Solar	28 September	Successful
28 September; 19:42	Apogee: 225 kilometres (140 mi)					
September	(Soviet Union) R-12 Dvina		(Soviet Union) Kapustin Yar		(Soviet Union) MVS	
September		MVS	Suborbital	Missile test		Successful
September	Apogee: 402 kilometres (250 mi)					
September	(Soviet Union) R-12 Dvina		(Soviet Union) Kapustin Yar		(Soviet Union) MVS	
September		MVS	Suborbital	Missile test		Successful
September	Apogee: 402 kilometres (250 mi)					
4 October; 14:00	(East Germany) (Soviet Union) A-1		(Soviet Union) Kapustin Yar		(Soviet Union) MVS	
4 October; 14:00		MVS	Suborbital	Ionospheric; Solar	4 October	Successful
4 October; 14:00	Apogee: 110 kilometres (68 mi)					
4 October; 15:08	(Soviet Union) R-11A Zemlya		(Soviet Union) Kapustin Yar		(Soviet Union) AN	
4 October; 15:08		AN	Suborbital	Aeronomy	4 October	Successful
4 October; 15:08	Apogee: 103 kilometres (64 mi)					
7 October	(United States) Nike-Cajun		(United States) Wallops Island		(United States) ARPA	
7 October	(United States) Hi Ball 3	ARPA	Suborbital	Technology	7 October	Successful
7 October	Apogee: 244 kilometres (152 mi)					
10 October; 03:49	(United States) PGM-19 Jupiter		(United States) Cape Canaveral LC-26B		(United States) ABMA	
10 October; 03:49		US Air Force	Suborbital	REV test	+49 seconds	Launch failure
10 October; 03:49	Fire burned through fuel and oxidiser transducer lines resulting in loss of control, destroyed by range safety					
10 October; 13:50	(East Germany) (Soviet Union) A-1		(Soviet Union) Kapustin Yar		(Soviet Union) MVS	
10 October; 13:50		MVS	Suborbital	Ionospheric; Solar	10 October	Successful
10 October; 13:50	Apogee: 110 kilometres (68 mi)					
10 October	(United States) WS-199B Bold Orion I		(United States) B-47, Cape Canaveral		(United States) US Air Force	
10 October		US Air Force	Suborbital	Missile test	10 October	Successful
10 October	Apogee: 100 kilometres (62 mi)					
10 October	(Soviet Union) R-11A Zemlya		(Soviet Union) Kapustin Yar		(Soviet Union) AN	
10 October		AN	Suborbital	Aeronomy	10 October	Successful
10 October	Apogee: 103 kilometres (64 mi)					
12 October; 08:32:06	(United States) Nike-Asp		(United States) USS Point Defiance, PO-13		(United States) US Navy	
12 October; 08:32:06		US Navy	Suborbital	Solar	12 October	Successful
12 October; 08:32:06	Apogee: 222 kilometres (138 mi)					
12 October; 08:42:03	(United States) Nike-Asp		(United States) USS Point Defiance, PO-13		(United States) US Navy	
12 October; 08:42:03		US Navy	Suborbital	Solar	12 October	Successful
12 October; 08:42:03	Apogee: 236 kilometres (147 mi)					
12 October; 08:43:18	(United States) Nike-Asp		(United States) USS Point Defiance, PO-13		(United States) US Navy	
12 October; 08:43:18		US Navy	Suborbital	Solar	12 October	Successful
12 October; 08:43:18	Apogee: 242 kilometres (150 mi)					
12 October; 08:52:49	(United States) Nike-Asp		(United States) USS Point Defiance, PO-13		(United States) US Navy	
12 October; 08:52:49		US Navy	Suborbital	Solar	12 October	Successful
12 October; 08:52:49	Apogee: 240 kilometres (150 mi)					
13 October; 19:40	(United States) Nike-Asp		(United States) USS Point Defiance, PO-13		(United States) US Navy	
13 October; 19:40		US Navy	Suborbital		13 October	Successful
13 October; 19:40	Apogee: 225 kilometres (140 mi)					
14 October; 12:00	(United States) Nike-Cajun		(Canada) Churchill		(United States) US Air Force	
14 October; 12:00		US Air Force	Suborbital	Meteorite research	14 October	Successful
14 October; 12:00	Apogee: 137 kilometres (85 mi)					
15 October; 01:04	(United States) Aerobee-150 (Hi)		(Canada) Churchill		(United States) US Air Force	
15 October; 01:04		US Air Force	Suborbital	Test flight	15 October	Successful
15 October; 01:04	Apogee: 156 kilometres (97 mi)					
15 October; 04:00	(United States) Nike-Cajun		(Canada) Churchill		(United States) US Air Force	
15 October; 04:00		US Air Force	Suborbital	Meteorite research	15 October	Successful
15 October; 04:00	Apogee: 151 kilometres (94 mi)					
15 October	(United States) UGM-27 Polaris AX		(United States) Cape Canaveral LC-25A		(United States) US Navy	
15 October		US Navy	Suborbital	Missile test	15 October	Launch failure
15 October	Apogee: 1 kilometre (0.62 mi)					
15 October	(East Germany) (Soviet Union) R-2A		(Soviet Union) Kapustin Yar SP-2		(Soviet Union) OKB-1	
15 October		OKB-1	Suborbital	Target	15 October	Successful
15 October	Apogee: 100 kilometres (62 mi)					
18 October; 03:25	(United States) Nike-Cajun		(Canada) Churchill		(United States) US Air Force	
18 October; 03:25		US Air Force	Suborbital	Meteorite research	18 October	Successful
18 October; 03:25	Apogee: 143 kilometres (89 mi)					
20 October; 22:01	(United States) Nike-Cajun		(Canada) Churchill		(United States) US Air Force	
20 October; 22:01		US Air Force	Suborbital	Ionospheric	20 October	Successful
20 October; 22:01	Apogee: 130 kilometres (81 mi)					
22 October; 03:45	(United States) Nike-Cajun		(Canada) Churchill		(United States) US Air Force	
22 October; 03:45		US Air Force	Suborbital	Meteorite research	22 October	Successful
22 October; 03:45	Apogee: 158 kilometres (98 mi)					
22 October; 14:22	(United States) Nike-Asp		(United States) White Sands		(United States) US Air Force	
22 October; 14:22		US Air Force	Suborbital		22 October	Successful
22 October; 14:22	Apogee: 200 kilometres (120 mi)					
22 October; 16:47	(United States) Aerobee-300		(Canada) Churchill		(United States) US Air Force	
22 October; 16:47		US Air Force	Suborbital	Meteorite research	22 October	Successful
22 October; 16:47	Apogee: 177 kilometres (110 mi)					
25 October; 19:27	(United States) Aerobee-300		(Canada) Churchill		(United States) US Air Force	
25 October; 19:27		US Air Force	Suborbital	Meteorite research	25 October	Successful
25 October; 19:27	Apogee: 418 kilometres (260 mi)					
31 October; 11:54	(Soviet Union) R-5A Pobeda		(Soviet Union) Kapustin Yar		(Soviet Union) AN	
31 October; 11:54		AN	Suborbital		31 October	Successful
31 October; 11:54	Apogee: 410 kilometres (250 mi)					
31 October; 19:59	(United States) Aerobee-150 (Hi)		(Canada) Churchill		(United States) US Navy	
31 October; 19:59		NRL	Suborbital	Aeronomy	31 October	Successful
31 October; 19:59	Apogee: 188 kilometres (117 mi)					
31 October; 20:46	(United States) Nike-Cajun		(Canada) Churchill		(United States) US Air Force	
31 October; 20:46		US Air Force	Suborbital	Weather; Imaging	31 October	Successful
31 October; 20:46	Apogee: 119 kilometres (74 mi)					
31 October	(Soviet Union) R-11A Zemlya		(Soviet Union) Ernst Krenkel Observatory		(Soviet Union) AN	
31 October		AN	Suborbital	Aeronomy	31 October	Successful
31 October	Apogee: 103 kilometres (64 mi)					
October	(Soviet Union) R-12 Dvina		(Soviet Union) Kapustin Yar		(Soviet Union) MVS	
October		MVS	Suborbital	Missile test		Successful
October	Apogee: 402 kilometres (250 mi)					
October	(Soviet Union) R-12 Dvina		(Soviet Union) Kapustin Yar		(Soviet Union) MVS	
October		MVS	Suborbital	Missile test		Successful
October	Apogee: 402 kilometres (250 mi)					
1 November	(Soviet Union) R-5M Pobeda		(Soviet Union) Kapustin Yar		(Soviet Union) RVSN	
1 November		RVSN	Suborbital	Nuclear test	1 November	Successful
1 November	Apogee: 500 kilometres (310 mi)					
3 November; 06:20	(United States) Aerobee-150 (Hi)		(Canada) Churchill		(United States) US Navy	
3 November; 06:20		NRL	Suborbital	Aeronomy; Ionospheric	3 November	Successful
3 November; 06:20	Apogee: 211 kilometres (131 mi)					
3 November	(Soviet Union) R-5M Pobeda		(Soviet Union) Kapustin Yar		(Soviet Union) RVSN	
3 November		RVSN	Suborbital	Nuclear test	3 November	Successful
3 November	Apogee: 500 kilometres (310 mi)					
3 November	(Soviet Union) R-5A Pobeda		(Soviet Union) Chelkar		(Soviet Union) RVSN	
3 November		RVSN	Suborbital	Target	3 November	Successful
3 November	Apogee: 500 kilometres (310 mi)					
4 November; 16:50	(United States) Nike-Cajun		(Canada) Churchill		(United States) US Air Force	
4 November; 16:50		US Air Force	Suborbital	Weather; Imaging	4 November	Successful
4 November; 16:50	Apogee: 122 kilometres (76 mi)					
4 November	(Soviet Union) R-5A Pobeda		(Soviet Union) Chelkar		(Soviet Union) RVSN	
4 November		RVSN	Suborbital	Target	4 November	Successful
4 November	Apogee: 500 kilometres (310 mi)					
5 November; 08:53	(United States) PGM-17 Thor DM-18A		(United States) Cape Canaveral LC-17B		(United States) US Air Force	
5 November; 08:53		US Air Force	Suborbital	Missile test	5 November	Successful
5 November; 08:53	Apogee: 520 kilometres (320 mi)					
5 November	(Soviet Union) R-5A Pobeda		(Soviet Union) Chelkar		(Soviet Union) RVSN	
5 November		RVSN	Suborbital	Target	5 November	Successful
5 November	Apogee: 500 kilometres (310 mi)					
6 November	(Soviet Union) R-11A Zemlya		(Soviet Union) Ostrov Kheysa		(Soviet Union) AN	
6 November		AN	Suborbital	Aeronomy	6 November	Successful
6 November	Apogee: 103 kilometres (64 mi)					
8 November; 01:53	(United States) Nike-Cajun		(Canada) Churchill		(Canada) CARDE	
8 November; 01:53		CARDE	Suborbital	Aeronomy	8 October	Successful
8 November; 01:53	Apogee: 139 kilometres (86 mi), first Canadian spaceflight					
13 November; 08:59	(United States) Nike-Cajun		(Canada) Churchill		(Canada) CARDE	
13 November; 08:59		CARDE	Suborbital	Aeronomy	13 November	Successful
13 November; 08:59	Apogee: 142 kilometres (88 mi)					
13 November; 17:34	(United States) Nike-Cajun		(Canada) Churchill		(United States) US Air Force	
13 November; 17:34		US Air Force	Suborbital	Weather; Imaging	13 November	Successful
13 November; 17:34	Apogee: 119 kilometres (74 mi)					
16 November; 06:56	(United States) Aerobee-150 (Hi)		(Canada) Churchill		(United States) US Navy	
16 November; 06:56		NRL	Suborbital	Auroral	16 November	Successful
16 November; 06:56	Apogee: 163 kilometres (101 mi)					
17 November	(United States) WS-199B Bold Orion I		(United States) B-47, Cape Canaveral		(United States) US Air Force	
17 November		US Air Force	Suborbital	Missile test	17 November	Successful
17 November	Apogee: 100 kilometres (62 mi)					
18 November; 04:00	(United States) SM-65B Atlas		(United States) Cape Canaveral LC-11		(United States) US Air Force	
18 November; 04:00		US Air Force	Suborbital	Missile test	18 November	Successful
18 November; 04:00	Apogee: 800 kilometres (500 mi)					
18 November; 16:47	(United States) Nike-Cajun		(Canada) Churchill		(United States) US Air Force	
18 November; 16:47		US Air Force	Suborbital	Weather; Imaging	18 November	Successful
18 November; 16:47	Apogee: 116 kilometres (72 mi)					
19 November; 21:51	(United States) Nike-Cajun		(Canada) Churchill		(United States) US Air Force	
19 November; 21:51		US Air Force	Suborbital		19 November	Successful
19 November; 21:51	Apogee: 140 kilometres (87 mi)					
19 November	(Soviet Union) R-11A Zemlya		(Soviet Union) Ostrov Kheysa		(Soviet Union) AN	
19 November		AN	Suborbital	Aeronomy	19 November	Successful
19 November	Apogee: 103 kilometres (64 mi)					
21 November; 06:08	(Soviet Union) R-5A Pobeda		(Soviet Union) Kapustin Yar		(Soviet Union) AN	
21 November; 06:08		AN	Suborbital		27 August	Successful
21 November; 06:08	Apogee: 460 kilometres (290 mi)					
23 November; 22:02	(United States) Nike-Cajun		(Canada) Churchill		(United States) US Air Force	
23 November; 22:02		US Air Force	Suborbital	Aeronomy	23 November	Successful
23 November; 22:02	Apogee: 131 kilometres (81 mi)					
24 November; 06:25:00	(United States) Aerobee-150 (Hi)		(Canada) Churchill		(United States) US Navy	
24 November; 06:25:00		NRL	Suborbital	Auroral	24 November	Successful
24 November; 06:25:00	Apogee: 207 kilometres (129 mi)					
24 November; 08:00	(United States) Nike-Cajun		(Canada) Churchill		(United States) US Air Force	
24 November; 08:00		US Air Force	Suborbital	Aeronomy	24 November	Launch failure
24 November; 08:00	Apogee: 13 kilometres (8.1 mi)					
26 November; 09:09	(United States) PGM-17 Thor DM-18A		(United States) Cape Canaveral LC-17B		(United States) US Air Force	
26 November; 09:09		US Air Force	Suborbital	Missile test	26 November	Successful
26 November; 09:09	Apogee: 520 kilometres (320 mi)					
29 November; 02:27	(United States) SM-65B Atlas		(United States) Cape Canaveral LC-14		(United States) US Air Force	
29 November; 02:27		US Air Force	Suborbital	Missile test	29 November	Successful
29 November; 02:27	Apogee: 900 kilometres (560 mi)					
29 November; 16:30	(United States) Aerobee-150 (Hi)		(Canada) Churchill		(United States) US Navy	
29 November; 16:30		NRL	Suborbital	Aeronomy; Ionospheric	29 November	Successful
29 November; 16:30	Apogee: 202 kilometres (126 mi)					
30 November; 18:36:36	(United States) Aerobee-300		(Canada) Churchill		(United States) US Air Force	
30 November; 18:36:36		US Air Force	Suborbital	Ionospheric	30 November	Successful
30 November; 18:36:36	Apogee: 304 kilometres (189 mi)					
30 November; 22:27	(United States) Nike-Cajun		(Canada) Churchill		(United States) US Air Force	
30 November; 22:27		US Air Force	Suborbital		30 November	Successful
30 November; 22:27	Apogee: 152 kilometres (94 mi)					
November	(Soviet Union) R-12 Dvina		(Soviet Union) Kapustin Yar		(Soviet Union) MVS	
November		MVS	Suborbital	Missile test		Successful
November	Apogee: 402 kilometres (250 mi)					
1 December; 19:35	(United States) Aerobee-300		(Canada) Churchill		(United States) US Navy	
1 December; 19:35		NRL	Suborbital	Ionospheric	1 December	Launch failure
1 December; 19:35	Apogee: 97 kilometres (60 mi)					
3 December; 10:13	(United Kingdom) Skylark-1		(Australia) Woomera LA-2		(United Kingdom) RAE	
3 December; 10:13		RAE	Suborbital	Aeronomy	3 December	Successful
3 December; 10:13	Apogee: 126 kilometres (78 mi)					
3 December; 18:39	(United States) Aerobee-300		(Canada) Churchill		(United States) US Navy	
3 December; 18:39		NRL	Suborbital	Ionospheric	3 December	Successful
3 December; 18:39	Apogee: 225 kilometres (140 mi)					
6 December; 00:41	(United States) PGM-17 Thor DM-18A		(United States) Cape Canaveral LC-18B		(United States) US Air Force	
6 December; 00:41		US Air Force	Suborbital	Missile test	6 December	Successful
6 December; 00:41	Apogee: 520 kilometres (320 mi)					
8 December	(United States) WS-199B Bold Orion II		(United States) B-47, Cape Canaveral		(United States) US Air Force	
8 December		US Air Force	Suborbital	Missile test	8 December	Successful
8 December	Apogee: 200 kilometres (120 mi)					
9 December	(United States) Nike-Cajun		(United States) Wallops Island		(United States) NACA	
9 December		NACA	Suborbital	Aeronomy; Weather; Imaging	9 December	Successful
9 December	Apogee: 100 kilometres (62 mi)					
9 December	(United States) Nike-Cajun		(United States) Wallops Island		(United States) NACA	
9 December		NACA	Suborbital	Aeronomy; Weather; Imaging	9 December	Successful
9 December	Apogee: 100 kilometres (62 mi)					
11 December	(Soviet Union) R-5A Pobeda		(Soviet Union) Chelkar		(Soviet Union) RVSN	
11 December		RVSN	Suborbital	Target	11 December	Successful
11 December	Apogee: 500 kilometres (310 mi)					
12 December	(Soviet Union) R-12 Dvina		(Soviet Union) Kapustin Yar		(Soviet Union) MVS	
12 December		MVS	Suborbital	Missile test	12 December	Successful
12 December	Apogee: 402 kilometres (250 mi)					
13 December; 08:53:44	(United States) PGM-19 Jupiter		(United States) Cape Canaveral LC-26B		(United States) ABMA	
13 December; 08:53:44	(United States) Bioflight 1	US Air Force	Suborbital	Biological	13 December	Successful
13 December; 08:53:44	Apogee: 500 kilometres (310 mi), carried a monkey, Gordo. Mission completed but recovery failed					
14 December	(Soviet Union) R-5A Pobeda		(Soviet Union) Chelkar		(Soviet Union) RVSN	
14 December		RVSN	Suborbital	Target	14 December	Successful
14 December	Apogee: 500 kilometres (310 mi)					
16 December; 23:44:45	(United States) PGM-17 Thor DM-18A		(United States) Vandenberg LC-75-1-1		(United States) US Air Force	
16 December; 23:44:45		US Air Force	Suborbital	Missile test	6 December	Successful
16 December; 23:44:45	Apogee: 520 kilometres (320 mi)					
16 December	(United States) WS-199B Bold Orion II		(United States) B-47, Cape Canaveral		(United States) US Air Force	
16 December		US Air Force	Suborbital	Missile test	16 December	Successful
16 December	Apogee: 200 kilometres (120 mi)					
17 December; 04:00	(United States) PGM-17 Thor DM-18A		(United States) Cape Canaveral LC-17B		(United States) US Air Force	
17 December; 04:00		US Air Force	Suborbital	Missile test	17 December	Successful
17 December; 04:00	Apogee: 520 kilometres (320 mi)					
23 December; 13:00	(East Germany) (Soviet Union) A-1		(Soviet Union) Kapustin Yar		(Soviet Union) MVS	
23 December; 13:00		MVS	Suborbital	Ionospheric; Aeronomy	23 December	Successful
23 December; 13:00	Apogee: 110 kilometres (68 mi)					
23 December	(Soviet Union) R-11A Zemlya		(Soviet Union) Ostrov Kheysa		(Soviet Union) AN	
23 December		AN	Suborbital	Aeronomy	23 December	Successful
23 December	Apogee: 100 kilometres (62 mi)					
24 December; 04:45	(United States) SM-65C Atlas		(United States) Cape Canaveral LC-12		(United States) US Air Force	
24 December; 04:45		US Air Force	Suborbital	Missile test	24 December	Successful
24 December; 04:45	Apogee: 900 kilometres (560 mi), maiden flight of Atlas C					
24 December; 16:00	(Soviet Union) R-7 Semyorka		(Soviet Union) Baikonur Site 1/5		(Soviet Union) MVS	
24 December; 16:00		MVS	Suborbital	Missile test	24 December	Launch failure
24 December; 16:00	Apogee: 70 kilometres (43 mi)					
24 December	(Soviet Union) R-12 Dvina		(Soviet Union) Kapustin Yar		(Soviet Union) MVS	
24 December		MVS	Suborbital	Missile test	24 December	Successful
24 December	Apogee: 402 kilometres (250 mi)					
25 December; 13:10	(East Germany) (Soviet Union) A-1		(Soviet Union) Kapustin Yar		(Soviet Union) MVS	
25 December; 13:10		MVS	Suborbital	Ionospheric; Aeronomy	25 December	Successful
25 December; 13:10	Apogee: 110 kilometres (68 mi)					
25 December	(Soviet Union) R-11A Zemlya		(Soviet Union) Ostrov Kheysa		(Soviet Union) AN	
25 December		AN	Suborbital	Aeronomy	25 December	Successful
25 December	Apogee: 102 kilometres (63 mi)					
25 December	(Soviet Union) R-12 Dvina		(Soviet Union) Kapustin Yar		(Soviet Union) MVS	
25 December		MVS	Suborbital	Missile test	25 December	Successful
25 December	Apogee: 402 kilometres (250 mi)					
30 December; 15:28	(United States) UGM-27 Polaris AX		(United States) Cape Canaveral LC-25A		(United States) US Navy	
30 December; 15:28		US Navy	Suborbital	Missile test	24 September	Launch failure
30 December; 15:28	Apogee: 200 kilometres (120 mi)					
30 December	(Soviet Union) R-12 Dvina		(Soviet Union) Kapustin Yar		(Soviet Union) MVS	
30 December		MVS	Suborbital	Missile test	30 December	Successful
30 December	Apogee: 402 kilometres (250 mi)					
31 December; 02:00	(United States) PGM-17 Thor DM-18A		(United States) Cape Canaveral LC-18B		(United States) US Air Force	
31 December; 02:00		US Air Force	Suborbital	Missile test	31 December	Launch failure
December	(Soviet Union) R-12 Dvina		(Soviet Union) Kapustin Yar		(Soviet Union) MVS	
December		MVS	Suborbital	Missile test		Successful
December	Apogee: 402 kilometres (250 mi)					
December	(Soviet Union) R-12 Dvina		(Soviet Union) Kapustin Yar		(Soviet Union) MVS	
December		MVS	Suborbital	Missile test		Successful
December	Apogee: 402 kilometres (250 mi)					
Unknown	(Australia) Long Tom		(Australia) Woomera LA-2		(Australia) WRE	
Unknown		WRE	Suborbital	Test flight		Successful
Unknown	Apogee: 100 kilometres (62 mi)					
Unknown	(Australia) Long Tom		(Australia) Woomera LA-2		(Australia) WRE	
Unknown		WRE	Suborbital	Test flight		Successful
Unknown	Apogee: 100 kilometres (62 mi)					
Unknown	(Australia) Long Tom		(Australia) Woomera LA-2		(Australia) WRE	
Unknown		WRE	Suborbital	Test flight		Successful
Unknown	Apogee: 100 kilometres (62 mi)					
Unknown	(Australia) Long Tom		(Australia) Woomera LA-2		(Australia) WRE	
Unknown		WRE	Suborbital	Test flight		Successful
Unknown	Apogee: 100 kilometres (62 mi)					
Unknown	(Australia) Long Tom		(Australia) Woomera LA-2		(Australia) WRE	
Unknown		WRE	Suborbital	Test flight		Successful
Unknown	Apogee: 100 kilometres (62 mi)					
