= 1958 in spaceflight (January–June) =

This article lists orbital and suborbital launches during the first half of the year 1958.

For all other spaceflight activities, see 1958 in spaceflight. For launches in the second half of 1958 see List of spaceflight launches in July–December 1958.

== Orbital launches ==
- ← Jan
- Feb
- Mar
- Apr
- May
- Jun
- Jul
- Aug
- Sep
- Oct
- Nov
- Dec →

Date and time (UTC)	Rocket	Flight number	Launch site		LSP	
Date and time (UTC)	Payload (⚀ = CubeSat)	Operator	Orbit	Function	Decay (UTC)	Outcome
Date and time (UTC)	Remarks					
=== February ===
1 February; 03:48:56	(United States) Juno I	RS-29 (UE)	(United States) Cape Canaveral LC-26A		(United States) ABMA	
1 February; 03:48:56	(United States) Explorer 1	ARPA	Initial: Medium Earth; Decayed to: Low Earth	Magnetospheric	31 March 1970	Successful
1 February; 03:48:56	First successful American satellite launch, discovered Van Allen belts.					
5 February; 07:33	(United States) Vanguard	TV-3BU	(United States) Cape Canaveral LC-18A		(United States) US Navy	
5 February; 07:33	(United States) Vanguard (Test Satellite G)	NRL	Intended: Medium Earth	Geodesy	5 February	Launch failure
5 February; 07:33	Loss of control 57 seconds after launch.					
← Jan; Feb; Mar; Apr; May; Jun; Jul; Aug; Sep; Oct; Nov; Dec →; === March ===
5 March; 18:27:57	(United States) Juno I	RS/CC-26 (UV)	(United States) Cape Canaveral LC-26A		(United States) ABMA	
5 March; 18:27:57	(United States) Explorer 2	ARPA	Intended: Medium Earth	Magnetospheric	5 March	Launch failure
5 March; 18:27:57	Fourth stage failed to ignite.					
17 March; 12:15:41	(United States) Vanguard	TV-4	(United States) Cape Canaveral LC-18A		(United States) US Navy	
17 March; 12:15:41	(United States) Vanguard 1 (Test Satellite H)	NRL	Medium Earth	Geodesy	In orbit	Successful
17 March; 12:15:41	First successful Vanguard launch. Oldest spacecraft still in orbit, in addition to its upper launch stage.					
26 March; 17:38:03	(United States) Juno I	RS-24 (UT)	(United States) Cape Canaveral LC-5		(United States) ABMA	
26 March; 17:38:03	(United States) Explorer 3	ARPA	Initial: Medium Earth; Decayed to: Low Earth	Magnetospheric	27 June	Successful
← Jan; Feb; Mar; Apr; May; Jun; Jul; Aug; Sep; Oct; Nov; Dec →; === April ===
27 April; 09:01	(Soviet Union) Sputnik	B1-2	(Soviet Union) Baikonur Site 1/5		(Soviet Union) MVS	
27 April; 09:01	(Soviet Union) D-1 №1	MVS	Intended: Low Earth	Magnetospheric	+88 seconds	Launch failure
27 April; 09:01	First flight of upgraded Sputnik-PS, Sputnik rocket. At T+90 seconds, abnormal vibrations originating from the strap-ons boosters were detected, followed by breakup of the vehicle 7 seconds later. First Soviet Launch failure.					
28 April; 02:53:00	(United States) Vanguard	TV-5	(United States) Cape Canaveral LC-18A		(United States) US Navy	
28 April; 02:53:00	(United States) Vanguard (X-ray/Environmental Satellite)	NRL	Intended: Medium Earth	Solar	29 April	Launch failure
28 April; 02:53:00	Third stage failed to ignite.					
← Jan; Feb; Mar; Apr; May; Jun; Jul; Aug; Sep; Oct; Nov; Dec →; === May ===
15 May; 07:00	(Soviet Union) Sputnik	B1-1	(Soviet Union) Baikonur Site 1/5		(Soviet Union) MVS	
15 May; 07:00	(Soviet Union) Sputnik 3 (D-1 №2)	OKB-1	Low Earth	Magnetospheric	6 April 1960	Partial spacecraft failure
15 May; 07:00	Last launch of Sputnik rocket. Faulty data recorder limited return of experimental results.					
28 May; 03:46:20	(United States) Vanguard	SLV-1	(United States) Cape Canaveral LC-18A		(United States) US Navy	
28 May; 03:46:20	(United States) Vanguard (Lyman-Alpha Satellite 1)	NRL	Intended: Medium Earth	Solar	28 May	Launch failure
28 May; 03:46:20	2nd stage attitude control failure prevented the 3rd stage from entering the correct angle for orbital insertion.					
← Jan; Feb; Mar; Apr; May; Jun; Jul; Aug; Sep; Oct; Nov; Dec →; === June ===
26 June; 05:00:52	(United States) Vanguard	SLV-2	(United States) Cape Canaveral LC-18A		(United States) US Navy	
26 June; 05:00:52	(United States) Vanguard (Lyman-Alpha Satellite 2)	NRL	Intended: Medium Earth	Solar	26 June	Launch failure
26 June; 05:00:52	2nd stage lost thrust after only 8 seconds of burning due to fuel line obstruction.					
← Jan; Feb; Mar; Apr; May; Jun; Jul; Aug; Sep; Oct; Nov; Dec →
For flights after 30 June, see 1958 in spaceflight (July–December)

== Suborbital flights ==
Date and time (UTC)	Rocket	Flight number	Launch site		LSP	
Date and time (UTC)	Payload (⚀ = CubeSat)	Operator	Orbit	Function	Decay (UTC)	Outcome
Date and time (UTC)	Remarks					
8 January	(United States) Nike-Asp		(United States) White Sands		(United States) US Air Force	
8 January		US Air Force	Suborbital		8 January	Successful
8 January	Apogee: 145 kilometres (90 mi)					
10 January; 15:48	(United States) SM-65A Atlas		(United States) Cape Canaveral LC-12		(United States) US Air Force	
10 January; 15:48		US Air Force	Suborbital	Missile test	10 January	Successful
10 January; 15:48	Apogee: 120 kilometres (75 mi)					
11 January	(United States) UGM-27 Polaris TV		(United States) Point Mugu		(United States) US Navy	
11 January		US Navy	Suborbital	Missile test	11 January	Successful
11 January	Maiden flight of Polaris, apogee: 500 kilometres (310 mi)					
17 January	(United States) UGM-27 Polaris TV		(United States) Cape Canaveral LC-3		(United States) US Navy	
17 January		US Navy	Suborbital	Missile test	17 January	Successful
17 January	Apogee: 500 kilometres (310 mi)					
25 January; 19:12	(United States) Nike-Cajun		(Canada) Churchill		(United States) US Air Force	
25 January; 19:12		US Air Force	Suborbital	Aeronomy	25 January	Successful
25 January; 19:12	Apogee: 157 kilometres (98 mi)					
26 January; 04:18:56	(United States) Aerobee-150 (Hi)		(Canada) Churchill		(United States) US Navy	
26 January; 04:18:56		NRL	Suborbital	Auroral	26 January	Successful
26 January; 04:18:56	Apogee: 180 kilometres (110 mi)					
27 January; 06:04	(United States) Nike-Cajun		(Canada) Churchill		(United States) US Air Force	
27 January; 06:04		US Air Force	Suborbital	Aeronomy	27 January	Successful
27 January; 06:04	Apogee: 129 kilometres (80 mi)					
27 January; 18:49	(United States) Aerobee		(Canada) Churchill		(United States) US Army	
27 January; 18:49		US Army	Suborbital	Aeronomy	27 January	Successful
27 January; 18:49	Apogee: 143 kilometres (89 mi)					
28 January; 20:16	(United States) PGM-17 Thor DM-18		(United States) Cape Canaveral LC-17A		(United States) US Air Force	
28 January; 20:16		US Air Force	Suborbital	Missile test	28 January	Launch failure
29 January; 19:06	(United States) Nike-Cajun		(Canada) Churchill		(United States) US Air Force	
29 January; 19:06		US Air Force	Suborbital	Aeronomy	29 January	Successful
29 January; 19:06	Apogee: 170 kilometres (110 mi)					
29 January; 22:15	(Soviet Union) R-7 Semyorka		(Soviet Union) Baikonur Site 1/5		(Soviet Union) MVS	
29 January; 22:15		MVS	Suborbital	Missile test	29 January	Successful
29 January; 22:15	Apogee: 1,350 kilometres (840 mi)					
3 February; 18:02	(United States) Aerobee-150 (Hi)		(Canada) Churchill		(United States) US Navy	
3 February; 18:02		NRL	Suborbital	Ionospheric	3 February	Successful
3 February; 18:02	Apogee: 138 kilometres (86 mi)					
4 February; 06:17	(United States) Aerobee-150 (Hi)		(Canada) Churchill		(United States) US Navy	
4 February; 06:17		NRL	Suborbital	Ionospheric	4 February	Successful
4 February; 06:17	Apogee: 234 kilometres (145 mi)					
7 February; 19:37	(United States) SM-65A Atlas		(United States) Cape Canaveral LC-14		(United States) US Air Force	
7 February; 19:37		US Air Force	Suborbital	Missile test	7 February	Launch failure
7 February; 19:37	Apogee: 120 kilometres (75 mi)					
13 February; 06:37	(United States) Nike-Cajun		(Canada) Churchill		(United States) US Air Force	
13 February; 06:37		US Air Force	Suborbital	Auroral	13 February	Successful
13 February; 06:37	Apogee: 129 kilometres (80 mi)					
16 February; 06:17	(United States) Nike-Cajun		(Canada) Churchill		(United States) US Air Force	
16 February; 06:17		US Air Force	Suborbital	Auroral	16 February	Successful
16 February; 06:17	Apogee: 121 kilometres (75 mi)					
20 February; 17:46	(United States) SM-65A Atlas		(United States) Cape Canaveral LC-12		(United States) US Air Force	
20 February; 17:46		US Air Force	Suborbital	Missile test	20 February	Launch failure
20 February; 17:46	Apogee: 90 kilometres (56 mi)					
21 February; 07:40	(Soviet Union) R-5A Pobeda		(Soviet Union) Kapustin Yar		(Soviet Union) AN	
21 February; 07:40		AN	Suborbital		21 February	Successful
21 February; 07:40	Apogee: 470 kilometres (290 mi)					
21 February; 08:42	(Soviet Union) R-5A Pobeda		(Soviet Union) Kapustin Yar		(Soviet Union) AN	
21 February; 08:42		AN	Suborbital		21 February	Successful
21 February; 08:42	Apogee: 400 kilometres (250 mi)					
21 February; 09:40	(East Germany) (Soviet Union) A-1		(Soviet Union) Kapustin Yar		(Soviet Union) MVS	
21 February; 09:40		MVS	Suborbital	Ionospheric; Solar	21 February	Successful
21 February; 09:40	Apogee: 206 kilometres (128 mi)					
21 February; 15:20	(Soviet Union) R-5A Pobeda		(Soviet Union) Kapustin Yar		(Soviet Union) AN	
21 February; 15:20		AN	Suborbital		21 February	Successful
21 February; 15:20	Apogee: 473 kilometres (294 mi)					
22 February; 02:02	(United States) Aerobee-150 (Hi)		(Canada) Churchill		(United States) US Navy	
22 February; 02:02		NRL	Suborbital	Ionospheric; Auroral	22 February	Successful
22 February; 02:02	Apogee: 225 kilometres (140 mi)					
22 February; 05:35	(United States) Nike-Cajun		(Canada) Churchill		(United States) US Air Force	
22 February; 05:35		US Air Force	Suborbital	Auroral	22 January	Successful
22 February; 05:35	Apogee: 129 kilometres (80 mi)					
24 February; 07:00	(United States) Aerobee-150 (Hi)		(Canada) Churchill		(United States) US Navy	
24 February; 07:00		NRL	Suborbital	Aeronomy	24 February	Successful
24 February; 07:00	Apogee: 207 kilometres (129 mi)					
24 February; 07:35	(United States) Nike-Cajun		(Canada) Churchill		(United States) US Air Force	
24 February; 07:35		US Air Force	Suborbital	Aeronomy	24 February	Successful
24 February; 07:35	Apogee: 145 kilometres (90 mi)					
26 February; 02:35	(East Germany) (Soviet Union) A-1		(Soviet Union) Ernst Krenkel Observatory		(Soviet Union) MVS	
26 February; 02:35		MVS	Suborbital	Ionospheric; Aeronomy	26 February	Successful
26 February; 02:35	Apogee: 100 kilometres (62 mi)					
26 February; 05:49	(United States) Nike-Cajun		(Canada) Churchill		(United States) US Air Force	
26 February; 05:49		US Air Force	Suborbital	Auroral	26 February	Successful
26 February; 05:49	Apogee: 129 kilometres (80 mi)					
26 February; 22:18	(United States) Nike-Cajun		(Canada) Churchill		(United States) US Army	
26 February; 22:18		BRL	Suborbital	Technology	26 February	Launch failure
26 February; 22:18	Apogee: 37 kilometres (23 mi), tested longer nosecone					
28 February; 13:08	(United States) PGM-17 Thor DM-18		(United States) Cape Canaveral LC-17B		(United States) US Air Force	
28 February; 13:08		US Air Force	Suborbital	Missile test	28 February	Launch failure
4 March; 06:02	(United States) Nike-Cajun		(Canada) Churchill		(United States) US Air Force	
4 March; 06:02		US Air Force	Suborbital	Aeronomy	4 March	Successful
4 March; 06:02	Apogee: 100 kilometres (62 mi)					
4 March; 19:30	(United States) Nike-Cajun		(Canada) Churchill		(United States) US Air Force	
4 March; 19:30		US Air Force	Suborbital	Aeronomy	4 March	Successful
4 March; 19:30	Apogee: 181 kilometres (112 mi)					
16 March; 04:54	(United States) Aerobee-150 (Hi)		(Canada) Churchill		(United States) US Navy	
16 March; 04:54		NRL	Suborbital	Auroral	16 March	Successful
16 March; 04:54	Apogee: 144 kilometres (89 mi)					
18 March	(United States) Nike Apache		(United States) White Sands		(United States) US Air Force	
18 March		US Air Force	Suborbital		18 March	Successful
18 March	Apogee: 107 kilometres (66 mi)					
19 March; 01:12	(United States) Aerobee		(Canada) Holloman LC-A		(United States) US Air Force	
19 March; 01:12		US Air Force	Suborbital	Aeronomy	19 March	Successful
19 March; 01:12	Apogee: 100 kilometres (62 mi)					
21 March	(United States) Aerobee		(Canada) Holloman LC-A		(United States) US Air Force	
21 March		US Air Force	Suborbital	Ionospheric	21 March	Successful
21 March	Apogee: 100 kilometres (62 mi)					
22 March; 06:41	(United States) Aerobee-150 (Hi)		(Canada) Churchill		(United States) US Navy	
22 March; 06:41		NRL	Suborbital	Auroral	22 March	Successful
22 March; 06:41	Apogee: 168 kilometres (104 mi)					
23 March; 18:07	(United States) Aerobee-150 (Hi)		(Canada) Churchill		(United States) US Navy	
23 March; 18:07		NRL	Suborbital	Auroral; Aeronomy	23 March	Successful
23 March; 18:07	Apogee: 202 kilometres (126 mi)					
23 March	(United States) UGM-27 Polaris TV		(United States) San Clemente		(United States) US Navy	
23 March		US Navy	Suborbital	Missile test	23 March	Successful
23 March	Apogee: 500 kilometres (310 mi)					
24 March; 18:30	(United States) Nike-Cajun		(Canada) Churchill		(United States) US Air Force	
24 March; 18:30		US Air Force	Suborbital	Aeronomy; Imaging	24 March	Successful
24 March; 18:30	Apogee: 119 kilometres (74 mi)					
24 March; 22:00	(United States) Nike-Cajun		(Canada) Churchill		(United States) US Air Force	
24 March; 22:00		US Air Force	Suborbital	Aeronomy	24 March	Successful
24 March; 22:00	Apogee: 137 kilometres (85 mi)					
29 March; 14:40	(Soviet Union) R-7 Semyorka		(Soviet Union) Baikonur Site 1/5		(Soviet Union) MVS	
29 March; 14:40		MVS	Suborbital	Missile test	29 March	Successful
29 March; 14:40	Apogee: 1,350 kilometres (840 mi)					
31 March	(Soviet Union) R-11FM Zemlya		(Soviet Union) B-67, Beloye More		(Soviet Union) OKB-1	
31 March		OKB-1	Suborbital	Missile test	31 March	Successful
31 March	Apogee: 200 kilometres (120 mi)					
4 April; 15:30	(Soviet Union) R-7 Semyorka		(Soviet Union) Baikonur Site 1/5		(Soviet Union) MVS	
4 April; 15:30		MVS	Suborbital	Missile test	4 April	Successful
4 April; 15:30	Apogee: 1,350 kilometres (840 mi)					
5 April; 17:01	(United States) SM-65A Atlas		(United States) Cape Canaveral LC-14		(United States) US Air Force	
5 April; 17:01		US Air Force	Suborbital	Missile test	5 April	Launch failure
5 April; 17:01	Apogee: 100 kilometres (62 mi)					
7 April	(United States) Nike-Cajun		(United States) Wallops Island		(United States) ARPA	
7 April	(United States) Hi Ball 1	ARPA	Suborbital	Technology	7 April	Successful
7 April	Apogee: 244 kilometres (152 mi)					
11 April	(United States) UGM-27 Polaris TV		(United States) San Clemente		(United States) US Navy	
11 April		US Navy	Suborbital	Missile test	11 April	Successful
11 April	Apogee: 500 kilometres (310 mi)					
17 April; 10:57	(United Kingdom) Skylark-1		(Australia) Woomera LA-2		(United Kingdom) RAE	
17 April; 10:57		RAE	Suborbital	Test flight Aeronomy	17 April	Successful
17 April; 10:57	Apogee: 152 kilometres (94 mi)					
18 April	(United States) UGM-27 Polaris TV		(United States) Cape Canaveral LC-25A		(United States) US Navy	
18 April		US Navy	Suborbital	Missile test	18 April	Successful
18 April	Apogee: 500 kilometres (310 mi)					
19 April; 13:30	(United States) PGM-17 Thor DM-18		(United States) Cape Canaveral LC-17B		(United States) US Air Force	
19 April; 13:30		US Air Force	Suborbital	Missile test	19 April	Launch failure
24 April; 00:10	(United States) Thor DM-18 Able		(United States) Cape Canaveral LC-17A		(United States) US Air Force	
24 April; 00:10		US Air Force	Suborbital	REV test	+150 seconds	Launch failure
24 April; 00:10	Maiden flight of Thor-Able, turbopump gearbox failed. REV carried Mia, a mouse					
24 April	(United States) Nike-Cajun		(United States) Wallops Island		(United States) ARPA	
24 April	(United States) Beacon Test 1	ARPA	Suborbital	Technology	24 April	Successful
24 April	Apogee: 122 kilometres (76 mi)					
1 May	(United States) Nike-Cajun		(United States) Holloman		(United States) US Air Force	
1 May		US Air Force	Suborbital	Meteorite research	1 May	Successful
1 May	Apogee: 100 kilometres (62 mi)					
5 May; 14:15	(United States) Aerobee		(United States) White Sands LC-35		(United States) US Navy	
5 May; 14:15		NRL	Suborbital	Solar	5 May	Successful
5 May; 14:15	Apogee: 214 kilometres (133 mi)					
8 May	(United States) UGM-27 Polaris TV		(United States) Cape Canaveral LC-25A		(United States) US Navy	
8 May		US Navy	Suborbital	Missile test	8 May	Successful
8 May	Apogee: 500 kilometres (310 mi)					
18 May; 05:05	(United States) PGM-19 Jupiter		(United States) Cape Canaveral LC-26B		(United States) ABMA	
18 May; 05:05		US Air Force	Suborbital	REV test	05:21	Successful
18 May; 05:05	Apogee: 500 kilometres (310 mi), carried a Gaslight re-entry vehicle which was recovered					
20 May; 04:26	(United Kingdom) Skylark-2		(Australia) Woomera LA-2		(United Kingdom) RAE	
20 May; 04:26		RAE	Suborbital	Test flight Aeronomy	20 May	Successful
20 May; 04:26	Apogee: 150 kilometres (93 mi)					
20 May; 09:34:35	(United States) Nike-Cajun		(United States) Holloman		(United States) US Air Force	
20 May; 09:34:35		US Air Force	Suborbital	Aeronomy	20 May	Successful
20 May; 09:34:35	Apogee: 101 kilometres (63 mi), released caesium and sodium					
21 May; 11:31:59	(United States) Nike-Cajun		(United States) Holloman		(United States) US Air Force	
21 May; 11:31:59		US Air Force	Suborbital	Aeronomy	21 May	Successful
21 May; 11:31:59	Apogee: 128 kilometres (80 mi), released caesium and sodium					
22 May; 00:57	(United States) Nike-Cajun		(United States) Wallops Island		(United States) ARPA	
22 May; 00:57	(United States) Hi Ball 2	ARPA	Suborbital	Technology	22 May	Successful
22 May; 00:57	Apogee: 240 kilometres (150 mi)					
22 May; 11:29:59	(United States) Nike-Cajun		(United States) Holloman		(United States) US Air Force	
22 May; 11:29:59		US Air Force	Suborbital	Aeronomy	22 May	Successful
22 May; 11:29:59	Apogee: 116 kilometres (72 mi), released sodium					
24 May; 10:30	(Soviet Union) R-7 Semyorka		(Soviet Union) Baikonur Site 1/5		(Soviet Union) MVS	
24 May; 10:30		MVS	Suborbital	Missile test	24 May	Launch failure
24 May; 10:30	Apogee: 1,350 kilometres (840 mi)					
25 May	(United States) Nike-Cajun		(United States) Wallops Island		(United States) ARPA	
25 May	(United States) Beacon Test 2	ARPA	Suborbital	Technology	25 May	Successful
25 May	Apogee: 122 kilometres (76 mi)					
25 May	(Soviet Union) R-11FM Zemlya		(Soviet Union) B-67, Beloye More		(Soviet Union) OKB-1	
25 May		OKB-1	Suborbital	Missile test	25 May	Successful
25 May	Apogee: 200 kilometres (120 mi)					
26 May	(Soviet Union) R-11FM Zemlya		(Soviet Union) B-67, Beloye More		(Soviet Union) OKB-1	
26 May		OKB-1	Suborbital	Missile test	26 May	Successful
26 May	Apogee: 200 kilometres (120 mi)					
May	(Soviet Union) R-12 Dvina		(Soviet Union) Kapustin Yar		(Soviet Union) MVS	
May		MVS	Suborbital	Missile test		Successful
May	Apogee: 402 kilometres (250 mi)					
3 June; 21:28	(United States) SM-65A Atlas		(United States) Cape Canaveral LC-12		(United States) US Air Force	
3 June; 21:28		US Air Force	Suborbital	Missile test	3 June	Successful
3 June; 21:28	Apogee: 120 kilometres (75 mi), final flight of Atlas A					
4 June; 15:15	(United States) Aerobee-150 (Hi)		(United States) Holloman LC-A		(United States) US Air Force	
4 June; 15:15		US Air Force	Suborbital	Solar	4 June	Successful
4 June; 15:15	Apogee: 200 kilometres (120 mi)					
4 June; 21:17	(United States) PGM-17 Thor DM-18		(United States) Cape Canaveral LC-18B		(United States) US Air Force	
4 June; 21:17		US Air Force	Suborbital	Missile test	4 June	Successful
4 June; 21:17	Apogee: 520 kilometres (320 mi)					
5 June; 11:30	(United Kingdom) Skylark-1		(Australia) Woomera LA-2		(United Kingdom) RAE	
5 June; 11:30		RAE	Suborbital	Test flight	5 June	Successful
5 June; 11:30	Apogee: 153 kilometres (95 mi)					
6 June	(United States) X-17		(United States) Cape Canaveral LC-25A		(United States) US Navy	
6 June		US Navy	Suborbital	REV test	6 June	Successful
6 June	Apogee: 100 kilometres (62 mi)					
13 June; 15:06	(United States) PGM-17 Thor DM-18		(United States) Cape Canaveral LC-17B		(United States) US Air Force	
13 June; 15:06		US Air Force	Suborbital	Missile test	13 June	Successful
13 June; 15:06	Apogee: 520 kilometres (320 mi)					
18 June; 10:35	(United Kingdom) Skylark-1		(Australia) Woomera LA-2		(United Kingdom) RAE	
18 June; 10:35		RAE	Suborbital	Aeronomy	18 June	Launch failure
18 June; 10:35	Apogee: 3 kilometres (1.9 mi)					
18 June; 15:15	(United Kingdom) Skylark-2		(Australia) Woomera LA-2		(United Kingdom) RAE	
18 June; 15:15		RAE	Suborbital	Aeronomy	18 June	Successful
18 June; 15:15	Apogee: 144 kilometres (89 mi)					
19 June; 21:15	(United Kingdom) Skylark-2		(Australia) Woomera LA-2		(United Kingdom) RAE	
19 June; 21:15		RAE	Suborbital	Test flight Aeronomy	19 June	Successful
19 June; 21:15	Apogee: 154 kilometres (96 mi)					
24 June	(United States) X-17		(United States) Cape Canaveral LC-25A		(United States) US Navy	
24 June		US Navy	Suborbital	REV test	24 June	Successful
24 June	Apogee: 100 kilometres (62 mi)					
26 June	(United States) Exos		(United States) Wallops Island		(United States) NACA/AFCRL	
26 June		NACA/AFCRL	Suborbital	Test flight	26 June	Successful
26 June	Apogee: 370 kilometres (230 mi), maiden flight of Exos					
27 June	(United States) WS-199B Bold Orion I		(United States) B-47, Cape Canaveral		(United States) US Air Force	
27 June		US Air Force	Suborbital	Missile test	27 June	Launch failure
27 June	Apogee: 10 kilometres (6.2 mi)					
June	(Soviet Union) R-12 Dvina		(Soviet Union) Kapustin Yar		(Soviet Union) MVS	
June		MVS	Suborbital	Missile test		Successful
June	Apogee: 402 kilometres (250 mi)					
June	(Soviet Union) R-12 Dvina		(Soviet Union) Kapustin Yar		(Soviet Union) MVS	
June		MVS	Suborbital	Missile test		Successful
June	Apogee: 402 kilometres (250 mi)					
June	(Soviet Union) R-12 Dvina		(Soviet Union) Kapustin Yar		(Soviet Union) MVS	
June		MVS	Suborbital	Missile test		Successful
June	Apogee: 402 kilometres (250 mi)					
