= NOTS-EV-2 Caleb =

U.S. military expendable launch system

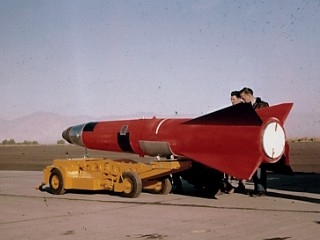
- Caleb launch vehicle on loading trolley
- Function: Expendable launch system Sounding rocket Anti-satellite weapon
- Manufacturer: United States Navy
- Country of origin: United States

Size
- Height: 4.9 metres (16 ft)
- Diameter: 0.6 metres (2 ft 0 in)
- Mass: 1,350 kilograms (2,980 lb)
- Stages: One (test); Two (test); Four (unflown)

Capacity

Payload to LEO
- Mass: 7 kilograms (15 lb)

Launch history
- Status: Retired
- Launch sites: Point Arguello; San Nicolas
- Total launches: 2 Caleb; 2 SIP; 3 Hi-Hoe
- Success(es): 1 Caleb (1 stage); 2 SIP; 1 Hi-Hoe
- Failure(s): 1 Caleb; 2 Hi-Hoe
- First flight: Caleb: 1960-07-28; SIP: 1961-10-01; Hi-Hoe: 1961-10-05
- Last flight: Caleb: 1960-10-24; SIP: 1962-05-05; Hi-Hoe: 1962-07-25

The NOTS-EV-2 Caleb, also known as NOTS-500, Hi-Hoe and SIP was an expendable launch system, which was later used as a sounding rocket and prototype anti-satellite weapon. It was developed by the United States Navy's Naval Ordnance Test Station (NOTS) as a follow-up to the NOTS-EV-1 Pilot, which had been abandoned following ten launches officially classified as failed missions. Two were launched in July and October 1960, before the cancellation of the project. Following cancellation, two leftover Calebs were used in the Satellite Interceptor Program (SIP), while three more were used as sounding rockets, under the designation Hi-Hoe. These derivatives flew until July 1962, when the Hi-Hoe made its final flight.

== Development ==
The Caleb was originally designed as a fast-response orbital launch system, to place small reconnaissance satellites, and other military payloads, into orbit at short notice. The orbital configurations were four-stage vehicles, whilst test launches used one- and two-stage configurations. The project was cancelled due to pressure from the United States Air Force, who were responsible for all other orbital launches conducted by the US military, and no attempts to launch the vehicle into orbit were made.

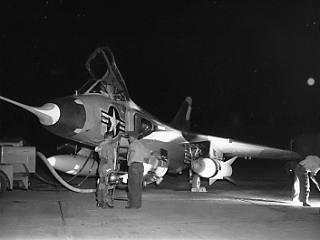
Caleb rocket mounted on F4D Skyray

Caleb was an air-launched rocket, with its two launches being conducted from F4D Skyray #747, the same aircraft used in the Pilot trials.

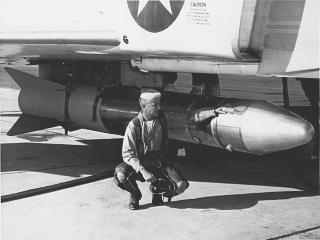
Hi-Hoe rocket mounted on F4H Phantom II

Hi-Hoe was also air-launched.

It was released from an F4H Phantom II, which provided greater performance. SIP launches were conducted from a ground launch pad on San Nicolas Island. The aircraft used for the airborne launches took off from Point Arguello, which later became part of Vandenberg Air Force Base, currently Vandenberg Space Force Base.

== Operational history ==
The Caleb made its maiden flight, in a single-stage test configuration, on 28 July 1960. Its second flight was made on 24 October of the same year, and used a two-stage configuration. It was unsuccessful, due to the second stage's failure to ignite. Both test launches were suborbital.

Both SIP launches used the two-stage configuration. The first was conducted on 1 October 1961. It was successful and reached an apogee of 20 kilometres (12 mi). The second test, launched on 5 May 1962 was also successful, and reached the same apogee. The three Hi-Hoe launches were conducted on 5 October 1961, and 26 March and 25 July 1962. On the first two launches the second stage failed to ignite, however the third was successful, and reached an apogee of 1,166 kilometres (725 mi).

Despite the program's turn towards success, the project was cancelled soon after the final Hi-Hoe test, the Department of Defense choosing to concentrate on the U.S. Air Force's Blue Scout sounding rocket program.

== Launch history ==
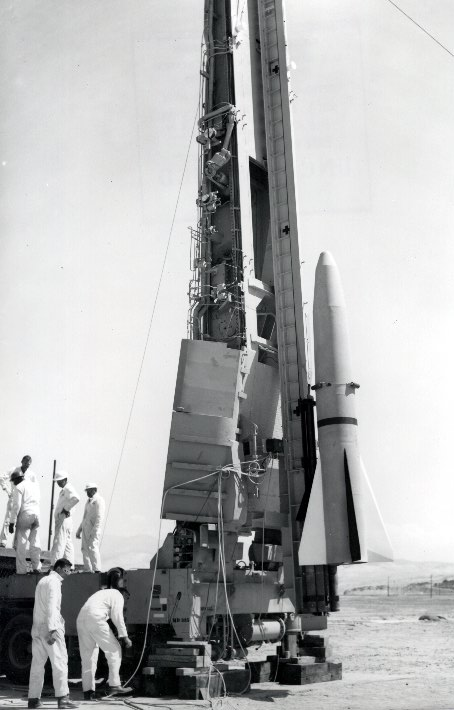
A SIP rocket on San Nicolas Island in August 1961, prior to the first launch

Date/Time (GMT)	Rocket	S/N	Outcome	Remarks
1960-07-28	Caleb	TV-1	Success	Single-stage
1960-10-24	Caleb	TV-2	Failure	Second stage failed to ignite
1961-10-01	SIP	SIP-1	Success	Ground launch
1961-10-05, 19:10	Hi-Hoe	NC17.116	Failure	Second stage failed to ignite
1962-03-26, 19:03	Hi-Hoe	NC17.121	Failure	Second stage failed to ignite
1962-05-05	SIP	SIP-2	Success	Ground launch
1962-07-25, 15:41	Hi-Hoe	NC17.117	Success	

== See also ==
- List of sounding rockets
- ASM-135 ASAT
- NOTS-EV-1 Pilot
- Jaguar (American rocket)
