= Jaguar (American rocket) =

United States Air Force sounding rocket

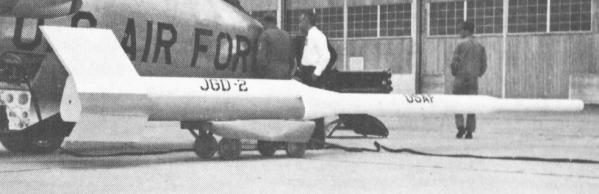
- Jaguar in front of B-57 launch aircraft
- Function: Sounding rocket
- Manufacturer: ARDC
- Country of origin: United States

Size
- Height: 8.029 m (26 ft 4.1 in)
- Diameter: 0.53 m (21 in)
- Mass: 730 kg (1,600 lb)
- Stages: Three

Payload to 800 km (500 mi)
- Mass: 16 kg (35 lb)

Launch history
- Status: Retired
- Launch sites: White Sands
- Total launches: 2
- First flight: 1960
- Last flight: 1961

First stage – Recruit cluster
- Diameter: 0.53 m (21 in)
- Powered by: 3 x XM19
- Maximum thrust: 156 kN (35,000 lb_{f}) each
- Burn time: 1.5 s
- Propellant: solid

Second stage – Recruit
- Diameter: 23 cm (9 in)
- Powered by: 1 x XM19
- Maximum thrust: 156 kN (35,000 lb_{f})
- Burn time: 1.5 s
- Propellant: solid

Third stage – Baby Sergeant
- Diameter: 16 cm (6.4 in)
- Powered by: 1 x 5.4KS1975
- Maximum thrust: 8.8 kN (2,000 lb_{f})
- Burn time: 5.4 s
- Propellant: solid

Jaguar was a three-stage sounding rocket developed by the United States Air Force in the early 1960s. Designed for air launch to allow soundings from remote areas without infrastructure, it was only launched twice before the project was abandoned.

== Design and development ==
Jaguar was an air-launched sounding rocket developed by the Air Research and Development Command of the U.S. Air Force, intended for use for high-altitude scientific research into the aurora borealis and radiation trapped in the Van Allen Belts. Derived from a design used by the Lewis Flight Propulsion Laboratory, it was a three-stage vehicle, with a first stage of three clustered Recruit rockets, a single Recruit as a second stage, and a third stage with a Baby Sergeant rocket. It was to be launched using a Martin B-57 Canberra medium bomber that was modified to carry the rocket on a side-mounted pylon; this allowed for the rocket to be launched from any location capable of operating a jet aircraft, without the need for installing launch infrastructure in remote areas. To launch, the Canberra would pull into a near-vertical climb, akin to that used for toss bombing, and release the rocket; Jaguar was expected to be capable of launching a 16-kilogram (35 lb) payload to an apogee of 800 kilometres (500 mi). An upgraded version using the improved "Yardbird" model of the Recruit was proposed.

== Operational history ==
Following six dummy launch tests starting in January 1958, Jaguar was launched twice; taking place at the White Sands Missile Range under the command of the Air Force Special Weapons Center, the first launch was conducted in late 1960, and the second in early 1961. Following the two launches, the program was abandoned.

== See also ==
- NOTS-EV-1 Pilot
- NOTS-EV-2 Caleb
- Sparoair
