= NOTS-EV-1 Pilot =

U.S. expendable launch system

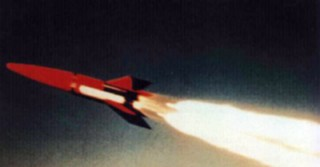
- Pilot rocket after launch
- Function: Expendable launch system Anti-satellite weapon
- Manufacturer: United States Navy
- Country of origin: United States

Size
- Height: 4.4 metres (14 ft)
- Diameter: 0.76 metres (2 ft 6 in)
- Mass: 950 kilograms (2,090 lb)
- Stages: Five

Capacity

Payload to LEO
- Mass: 1.05 kilograms (2.3 lb)

Launch history
- Status: Retired
- Launch sites: China Lake LC-G2; Point Mugu NAS
- Total launches: 4 Pilot-1; 6 Pilot-2
- Success(es): 0
- Failure: 10
- First flight: Pilot-1: 1958-07-04; Pilot-2: 1958-07-25
- Last flight: Pilot-1: 1958-08-17; Pilot-2: 1958-08-28
- Carries passengers or cargo: Pilot

Boosters (Pilot-2) – F4D Skyray
- No. boosters: 1
- Powered by: 1 J57-8
- Maximum thrust: 71.14 kilonewtons (15,990 lb_{f})
- Propellant: JP-4/Air

First stage
- Powered by: 2 HOTROC
- Maximum thrust: 63.2 kilonewtons (14,200 lb_{f})
- Burn time: 4.9 seconds
- Propellant: Solid

Second stage
- Powered by: 2 HOTROC
- Maximum thrust: 63.2 kilonewtons (14,200 lb_{f})
- Burn time: 4.9 seconds
- Propellant: Solid

Third stage
- Powered by: 1 X-241
- Maximum thrust: 12.1 kilonewtons (2,700 lb_{f})
- Burn time: 36 seconds
- Propellant: Solid

Fourth stage
- Powered by: 1 NOTS-8
- Maximum thrust: 5.1 kilonewtons (1,100 lb_{f})
- Burn time: 5.7 seconds
- Propellant: Solid

Fifth stage
- Powered by: 1 NOTS-3SM
- Maximum thrust: 700 newtons (160 lb_{f})
- Burn time: 1 second
- Propellant: Solid

The NOTS-EV-1 Pilot, better known as NOTSNIK (pronounced notsnik a play on "sputnik") was an expendable launch system and anti-satellite weapon developed by the United States Navy's United States Naval Ordnance Test Station (NOTS). NOTSNIK began as an in-house project using available NOTS funds. The Advanced Research Projects Agency later supplied some funds for the program. The program involved creating transistorized sensors to detect nuclear explosions from the Operation Argus tests. Ten were launched during July and August 1958, all of which failed. It was the first air-launched rocket to be used for an orbital launch attempt; however, none was recorded as having reached orbit. Following the third orbital launch attempt a NOTS engineer at the tracking station in Christchurch, New Zealand reported receiving a weak signal from the spacecraft; This was never confirmed, and the launches were not catalogued as having reached orbit. The Pilot rocket was part of Project Pilot.

== Overview ==
Two variants of the Pilot rocket were built; the Pilot-1, with battleship second to fifth stages, was used for ground-launched atmospheric tests from China Lake, and the Pilot-2, an air-launched version, was used for orbital launch attempts. Orbital launches were conducted from a stripped–down jet carrier aircraft, an F4D–1 Skyray, flying from Point Mugu Naval Air Station, and releasing the rocket over the Santa Barbara Channel Drop Zone. Of the ten launches, four were of Pilot-1s, and the rest Pilot-2s.

The first air–launch was performed on 25 July 1958 by NOTS research pilot William West, a career US Navy officer. The flight originated from China Lake's airstrip at Inyokern. The jet fighter was placed into a steep climb. The rocket released automatically at 41,000 feet (12,000 m), and three seconds later the first two HOTROCs ignited. The first flight was a failure. The second air–launch, in August, ended in a HOTROC explosion. On the third attempt the F4D pilot reported that the missile exploded, just like the first two had. Radio contact with the ground was lost during the second–stage burn, but the rocket appeared on film, departing over the horizon. Though objects believed to be the nozzle seal, and perhaps missile or fin skin were seen departing the disappearing missile. A NOTS engineer, Frank St. George at the tracking station at Christchurch New Zealand alone of the four stations which remained listening reported a faint single beep at the predicted time during the first orbital windows. No further signal was received, so the mission was also declared a failure.

Project Pilot was cancelled in August 1958, and replaced by the NOTS-EV-2 Caleb; The project remained classified until 1994. Following this series of tests, and the follow-on Caleb program being riddled with multiple failures, US Secretary of Defense Robert McNamara decided to terminate the Navy's space program and assign all responsibility to the US Air Force.

== Launch history ==
Date	Configuration	Payload	Function	Cause of failure
1958-07-04	Pilot-1	N/A	Test	Exploded one second after launch
1958-07-18	Pilot-1	N/A	Test	Exploded on launch pad
1958-07-25	Pilot-2	Pilot-1	Test	Unexpected loss of signal
1958-08-12	Pilot-2	Pilot-2	Test	Exploded during first stage ignition
1958-08-16	Pilot-1	N/A	Test	Structural failure 3.2 seconds after launch
1958-08-17	Pilot-1	N/A	Test	Structural failure 3 seconds after launch
1958-08-22	Pilot-2	Pilot-3	Test	Unexpected loss of signal
1958-08-25	Pilot-2	Pilot-4	Radiation research	Exploded during first stage ignition
1958-08-26	Pilot-2	Pilot-5	Radiation research	Failed to ignite
1958-08-28	Pilot-2	Pilot-6	Radiation research	Only one second stage engine ignited

== See also ==
- Jaguar, sounding rocket launched from B-57
