= ASCAMP =

ASCAMP is a sub-orbital sounding rocket that was built in 1956 by the Cooper Development Company. This was a two-stage vehicle that could reach an altitude of 110 km (68 mi). There were a total of 27 launches, all taking place in 1958, with 1 failure.
