= 1959 in spaceflight =

Orbital launches
- First: 2 January
- Last: 26 November
- Total: 23
- Successes: 10
- Failures: 11
- Partial failures: 2
- Catalogued: 14

Rockets
- Maiden flights: Thor-Agena; Atlas-Able; Atlas D (suborbital test); Sergeant-Delta (suborbital)
- Retirements: Vanguard

Luna 1 was the first spacecraft to leave the gravitational influence of Earth. Also in 1959, Luna 2 was the first spacecraft to reach the surface of another celestial body, impacting the Moon, and Luna 3 returned the first images of the far side of the Moon.

1959 in spaceflight

== Deep Space Rendezvous ==
Date (GMT)	Spacecraft	Event	Remarks
4 January	Luna 1	First Lunar flyby	Failed impactor, closest approach: 6,000 kilometres (3,700 mi)
4 March	Pioneer 4	Lunar flyby	Closest approach: 60,200 kilometres (37,400 mi)
14 September	Luna 2	First Lunar impact	Landed in Mare Imbrium, first spacecraft to reach the surface of a celestial body
6 October	Luna 3	Lunar flyby	First Circumlunar flight, returned 29 pictures including first images of the far side of the Moon; closest approach 6,200 kilometres (3,900 mi)

== Orbital launch statistics ==
=== By country ===
Country	Launches	Successes	Failures	Partial failures
Soviet Union	4	2	1	1
United States	19	9	9	1
World	23	11	10	2

=== By rocket ===
Rocket	Country	Tipe	Family	Launches	Successes	Failures	Partial failures	Remarks
Atlas D-Able	United States	Atlas-Able	Atlas	1	0	1	0	Maiden flight
Juno II	United States	Juno	Jupiter	4	1	2	1	
Luna 8K72	Soviet Union	Vostok	R-7	4	2	1	1	
Thor DM-18 Agena-A	United States	Thor-Agena	Thor	8	5	3	0	Maiden flight
Thor DM-18 Able-II	United States	Thor-Able	Thor	1	0	1	0	
Thor DM-18 Able-III	United States	Thor-Able	Thor	1	1	0	0	
Vanguard	United States	Vanguard	Viking	4	2	2	0	Retired

=== By family ===
Family	Country	Launches	Successes	Failures	Partial failures	Remarks
Atlas	United States	1	0	1	0	
Jupiter	United States	4	1	2	1	
R-7	Soviet Union	4	2	1	1	
Thor	United States	10	6	4	0	
Viking	United States	4	2	2	0	Retired

=== By orbit ===
Orbital regime	Launches	Successes	Failures	Accidentally Achieved	Remarks
Low Earth	12	7	5	0	
Medium Earth	4	1	3	0	
High Earth	2	2	0	0	Including Highly elliptical orbits
Heliocentric	5	3	2	0	

== See also ==
- Timeline of spaceflight
