= RM-86 Exos =

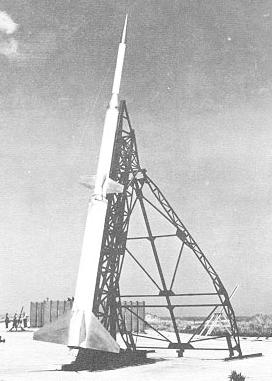
- Function: Sounding rocket
- Manufacturer: University of Michigan
- Country of origin: United States

Size
- Height: 12.941 metres (42 ft 5.5 in)
- Diameter: 580 millimetres (22.9 in)
- Mass: 2,660 kilograms (5,870 lb)
- Stages: Three

Launch history
- Status: Retired
- Launch sites: Wallops Flight Facility, Eglin AFB
- Total launches: 10
- Success(es): 9
- Failure: 1
- First flight: June 26, 1958
- Last flight: November 2, 1965

First stage - MGR-1 Honest John
- Engines: Hercules M6
- Thrust: 404 kN (91,000 lb_{f})
- Burn time: 4.4 seconds
- Propellant: Solid

Second stage MIM-3 Nike Ajax
- Engines: Allegheny Ballistics X216A2
- Thrust: 246 kN (55,000 lb_{f})
- Burn time: 3 seconds
- Propellant: Solid

Third stage
- Engines: Thiokol XM19
- Thrust: 167 kN (38,000 lb_{f})
- Burn time: 1.6 seconds
- Propellant: Solid

The Exos, originally designated RM-86 and later PWN-4, was a sounding rocket developed by the University of Michigan and NACA for use by the United States Air Force.

== History ==
Developed by the University of Michigan for use by the Air Force Cambridge Research Center, Exos used a three-stage configuration, consisting of a first-stage rocket from an Honest John rocket, a second stage from a Nike-Ajax surface-to-air missile, and a Thiokol XM19 upper stage. It was designated XRM-86 in April 1959, and redesignated PWN-4A in June 1963.

Utilising a rail launcher, the first launch of a full Exos vehicle took place in June 1958, launched from the Wallops Flight Facility. Eight operational launches took place between 1960 and 1965, launched from Eglin Air Force Base.

== Launch history ==
| Date (UTC) | Rocket | Launch site | Apogee | Outcome | Mission |
|---|---|---|---|---|---|
| 26 June 1958 | Exos | Wallops Island | 370 kilometres (230 mi) | Success | Test launch |
| 25 September 1958 | Exos | Wallops Island | 460 kilometres (290 mi) | Success | Test launch |
| 19 February 1960 | Exos | Eglin AFB | 37 kilometres (23 mi) | Failure | Chemical release research |
| 11 August 1961 | Exos | Eglin AFB | 114 kilometres (71 mi) | Success | Ionospheric research |
| 3 August 1962 | Exos | Eglin AFB | 365 kilometres (227 mi) | Success | Bipolar Probe ionospheric research |
| 25 October 1962 | Exos | Eglin AFB | 669 kilometres (416 mi) | Success | Ionospheric research |
| 25 July 1963 | Exos | Eglin AFB | 623 kilometres (387 mi) | Success | Ionospheric research |
| 25 May 1965 | Exos | Eglin AFB | 488 kilometres (303 mi) | Success | Ionospheric research |
| 2 November 1965 | Exos | Eglin AFB | 686 kilometres (426 mi) | Success | International Quiet Sun Year aeronomy mission |
